= Normandie Heights, Pasadena, California =

Neighborhood in Pasadena, California

Coordinates: 34.171415°N 118.132132°W

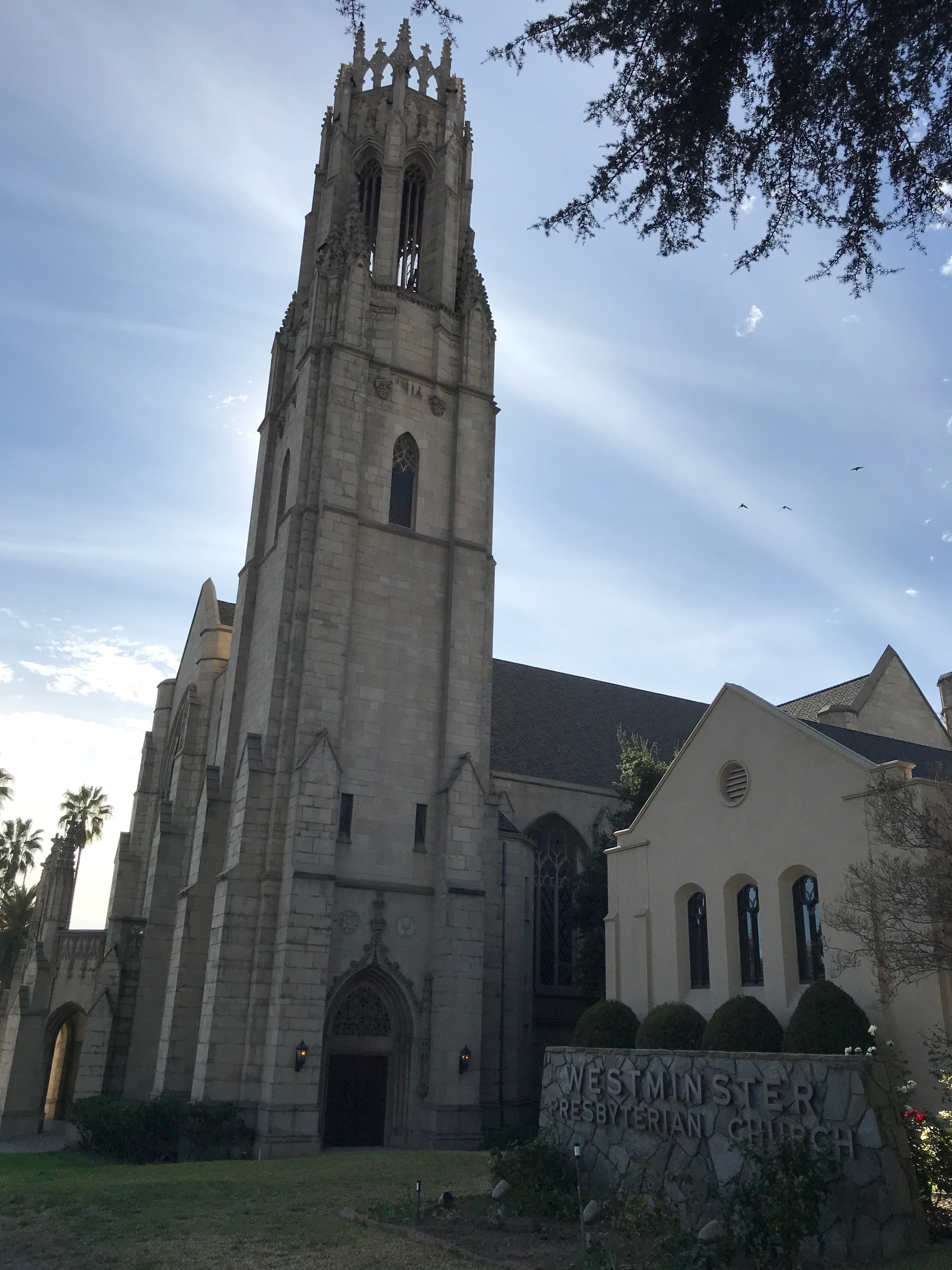
Spire of Westminster Presbyterian Church

Normandie Heights is a neighborhood in Pasadena, California. It is bordered by Woodbury Road to the north, Washington Boulevard to the south, Los Robles Avenue to the west, and Lake Avenue to the east. While the exterior of many older homes in Southern California have been coated with stucco, Normandie is distinguished by a high concentration of Craftsman homes with well-maintained wooden exteriors. Accordingly, the City of Pasadena has designated more than 50 homes in the neighborhood as architectural landmarks, many on Rio Grande Street, between Los Robles Avenue and El Molino Avenue, which was the site of the first residences in the neighborhood.

A significant number of motion pictures and television shows have been shot in Normandie Heights, including parts of the films Valkyrie, Old School, Wedding Crashers, The War of the Worlds, and The Wedding Planner.

== Landmarks ==
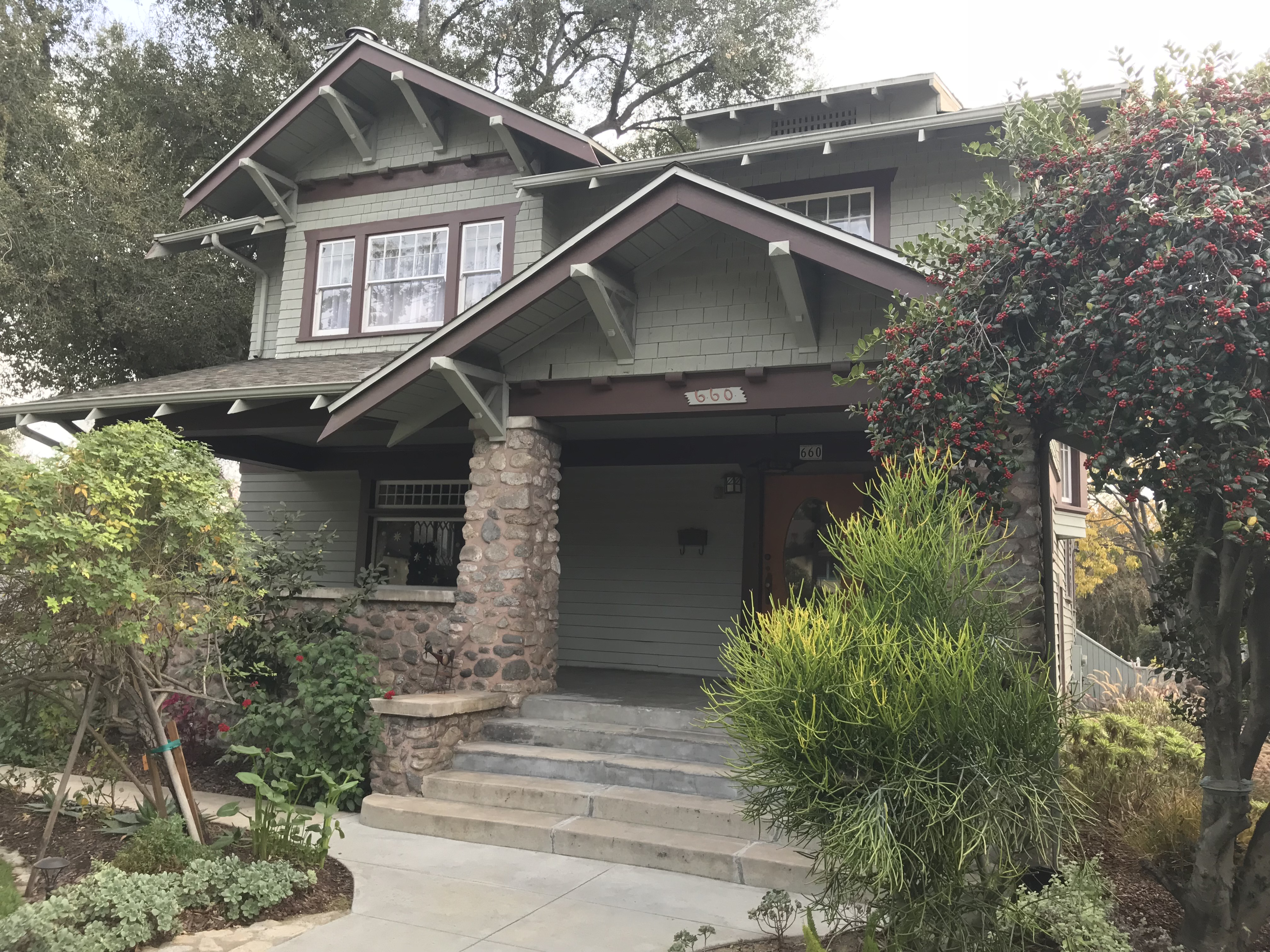
The Francis W. Wilson-designed Seth Cook Rees House

Normandie's most prominent landmark is the clock tower at Westminster Presbyterian Church. St. Elizabeth of Hungary Catholic Church is associated with Normandie Heights, but is located on the northern side of Woodbury Road, just outside the neighborhood boundaries.

The Seth Cook Rees House, designed by Francis W. Wilson for the pastor and evangelist Seth Cook Rees (1854-1933), is also located in the neighborhood. The home, located at the southeast corner of Elizabeth Street and El Molino Avenue, has been designated as an historical landmark by the City of Pasadena, and serves as a prime example of Arts and Crafts period residential architecture.

The Normandie Heights Estate, designed by Pasadena architect Sylvanus Marston in the Colonial Revival style and built in 1911, was named for the community. The estate and its gardens were featured as a showpiece of Pasadena in the 1913 Tournament of Roses Pictorial.

A collection of bungalows known as Washington Court, built in 1924 and located on the southwest edge of the neighborhood, has also been listed on the National Register of Historic Places as an exemplar of the English Cottage Revival style.

Pasadena's Washington Theater, currently undergoing rehabilitation, is located at the southeastern edge of the neighborhood. The theater, which enjoys historical landmark designation, was completed in 1924 and designed by the architect Clarence L. Jay in the Spanish Colonial Revival style. The theater was substantially remodeled on the exterior in 1937 in the Streamline Moderne style. The theater's rehabilitation envisions removal of the 1937 marquee, and restoration of the original 1924 marquee.

== Education ==
Normandie Heights is served by Longfellow and Altadena Elementary Schools, Eliot Middle School, and Muir and Pasadena High Schools. St. Elizabeth Parish School draws many children from the Normandie Heights neighborhood.

The neighborhood is equidistant between the California Institute of Technology campus and Caltech/NASA's Jet Propulsion Laboratory.

== Transportation ==
Normandie Heights was once served by the Mount Lowe Railway, which terminated at Lake Avenue and Calaveras Street, as well as the North Lake and East Washington lines of the Red Car trolley system.

Normandie Heights is currently served by Metro Local line 662. The neighborhood is also served by Pasadena Transit routes 20, 31, 32 and 33.

== Government ==
Normandie Heights is split between Pasadena City Council District 1, represented by Tyron Hampton, District 3, represented by John J. Kennedy, and District 5, represented by Jessica Rivas.

== Notable residents ==
- Seth Cook Rees (1854-1933), pastor and evangelist; prominent figure in the "holiness movement"
- Sirhan Sirhan, assassin of Robert F. Kennedy
