= Adam Crooks =

Adam Crooks may refer to:

- Adam Crooks (politician), Canada
- Adam Crooks (activist), Wesleyan Methodist minister
