= Emmanuel Association of Churches =

Methodist denomination

Emmanuel Association
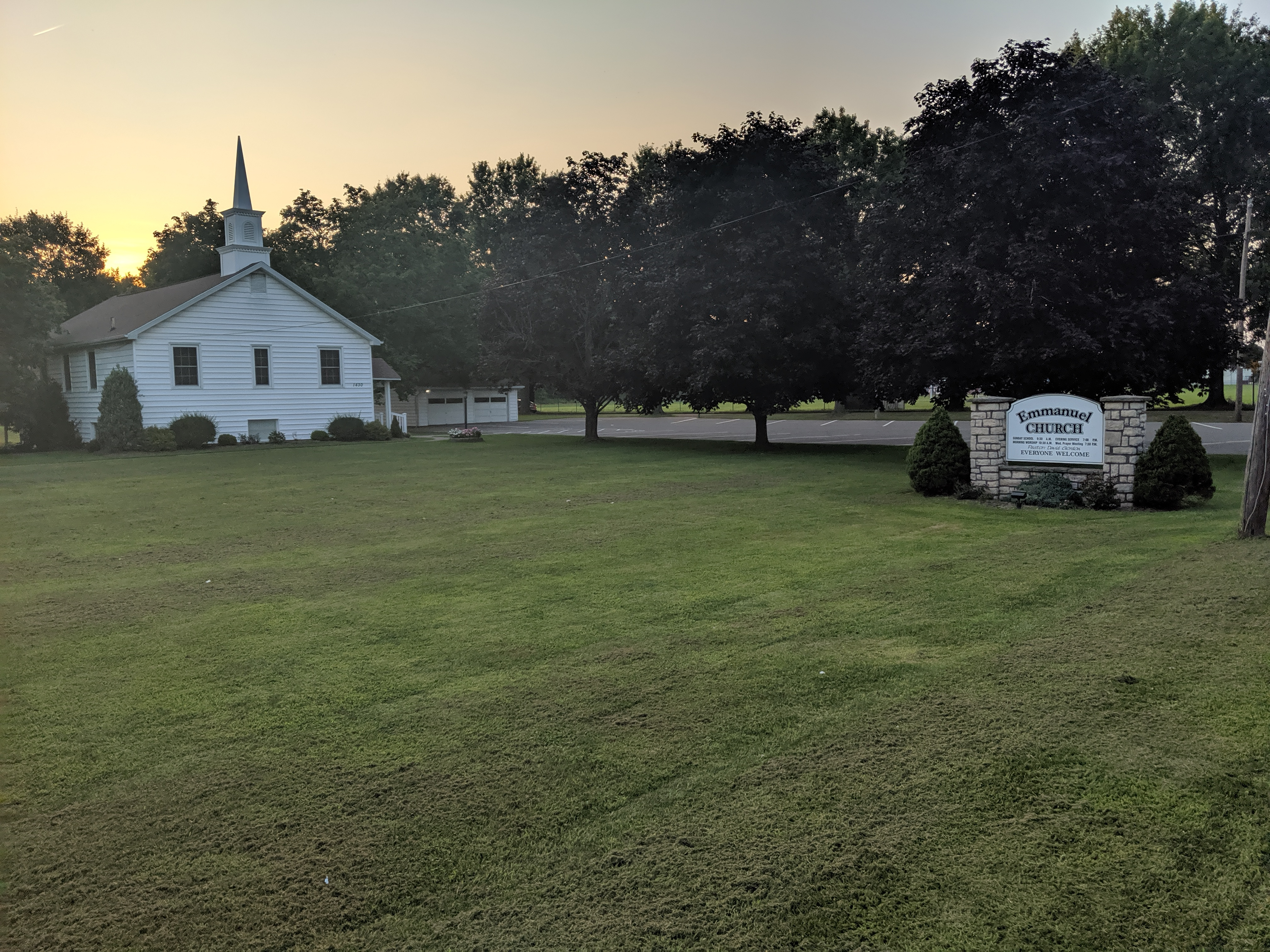
- Emmanuel Church in New Philadelphia, Ohio, is a parish church belonging to the Emmanuel Association.
- Classification: Methodism
- Orientation: Conservative holiness movement
- Polity: Connexionalism
- Associations: Interchurch Holiness Convention
- Headquarters: Alliance, Ohio
- Origin: 1937
- Separated from: Pilgrim Holiness Church
- Separations: Grace Tabernacle Church (1980s)
- Congregations: 17

The tabernacle of the R.G. Finch Memorial Holiness Methodist Campground, which holds the denomination's annual camp meeting

The Emmanuel Association of Churches is a Methodist denomination in the conservative holiness movement. (Note: The Emmanuel Association of Churches, throughout history, has been called the Emmanuel Methodist Association, Emmanuel Missionary Association, Emmanuel Association, and Emmanuel Association of Churches.)

The formation of the Emmanuel Association is a part of the history of Methodism in the United States. It was formed in 1937 as a result of a schism in the Pilgrim Holiness Church, led by Ralph Goodrich Finch, the former general superintendent of Foreign Missions in that denomination. Adherents are called Emmanuel Methodists. It is one of the oldest denominations of the conservative holiness movement. Like other Methodist bodies, it is governed by a General Conference.

The Emmanuel Association's holiness standards are codified in the text titled "Principles of Holy Living". The denomination is opposed to warfare, thus falling into the Holiness Methodist Pacifists subgroup of the holiness movement. It advocates for the principle of nonresistance:

We believe in non-resistance in a qualified sense--that war, dueling, suicide, prenatal destruction of life, and all other forms of willful human life-taking are murder. The last military command that Jesus gave was, "Put up again thy sword into his place; for all they that take the sword shall perish with the sword" (Matt 26:52). "Ye have heard that it hath been said, An eye for an eye, and a tooth for a tooth: but I say unto you, That ye resist not evil: but whosoever shall smite thee on thy right cheek, turn to him the other also. And if any man will sue thee at the law, and take thy coat, let him have thy cloke also. And whosoever shall compel thee to go a mile, go with him twain" (Matt. 5:38-40). There is no harm in seeking protection under a civil law that is in harmony with the Gospel, as did Paul in Jerusalem when in the hands of a violent mob, and also when transferred from Jerusalem to Caesarea (Acts 21:30-34; 22:24-30; 23:16-30). We must not, however, take the law into our own hands, and by acts of violence force an issue; but rather depend on civil authorities to execute the law. "If any man will sue thee at the law, and take away thy coat" suggests a regular coat trial. A brother has the right to appear before the court to testify truthfully in respect to his garment or property, and if the final decision is against him, through false witness or bribes or any other unfair influence, he must submit cheerfully, and give more rather than seek revenge. The same principle holds good in being compelled to take someone a mile, etc. Jesus says, "Take him two," and seek not revenge. God says, "Vengeance is mine, I will repay." It is the "more" that will touch the enemy's heart. "For it is better, if the will of God be so, that ye suffer for well doing, than for evil doing." (1 Peter 3:17).

The Emmanuel Association is based in Alliance, Ohio. It has had churches in cities across the world, including Colorado Springs (Colorado), Campo (Colorado), Hartman (Colorado), Rocky Ford (Colorado), Hayden Lake (Idaho), Logansport (Indiana), Terre Haute (Indiana), Hunter (Kansas), Tollesboro (Kentucky), Kansas City (Missouri), Hayes Center (Nebraska), Shubert (Nebraska), Vineland (New Jersey), Alliance (Ohio), Cincinnati (Ohio), East Palestine (Ohio), Lisbon (Ohio), Little York (Ohio), New Philadelphia (Ohio), Newton Falls (Ohio), Octa (Ohio), Salem (Ohio), Xenia (Ohio), Garrett (Pennsylvania), Gratz (Pennsylvania), Herndon (Pennsylvania), White Haven (Pennsylvania), Watertown (South Dakota), Touchet (Washington), Reed (West Virginia), and Bethesda (Ontario), as well as in parts of Guatemala, Bolivia and Africa.

The association holds an annual camp meeting at Hickory Grove Campground (R.G. Finch Memorial Holiness Methodist Campground) in Tollesboro and its tabernacle was built in memory of Reverend R. G. Finch. The connection ran Peoples Bible College in Colorado Springs until May 1994. The Emmanuel Methodist Association of Churches maintains relations with the Wesleyan Brethren, another Methodist denomination aligned with the conservative holiness movement; the two denominations publish a joint periodical entitled Consider.

== See also ==
- Immanuel Missionary Church
