= Martin Wells Knapp =

American Methodist minister (1853–1901)

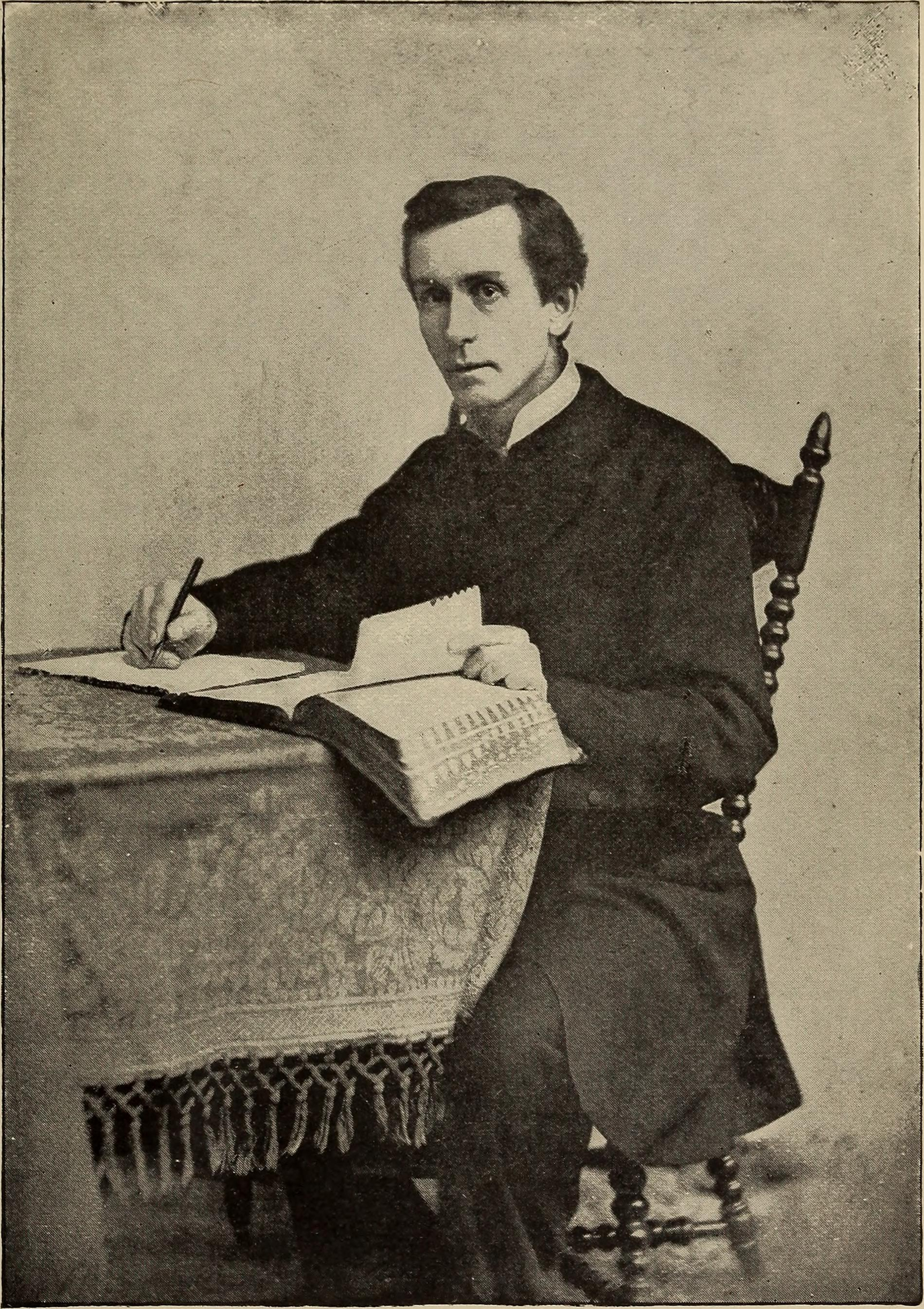
Martin Wells Knapp

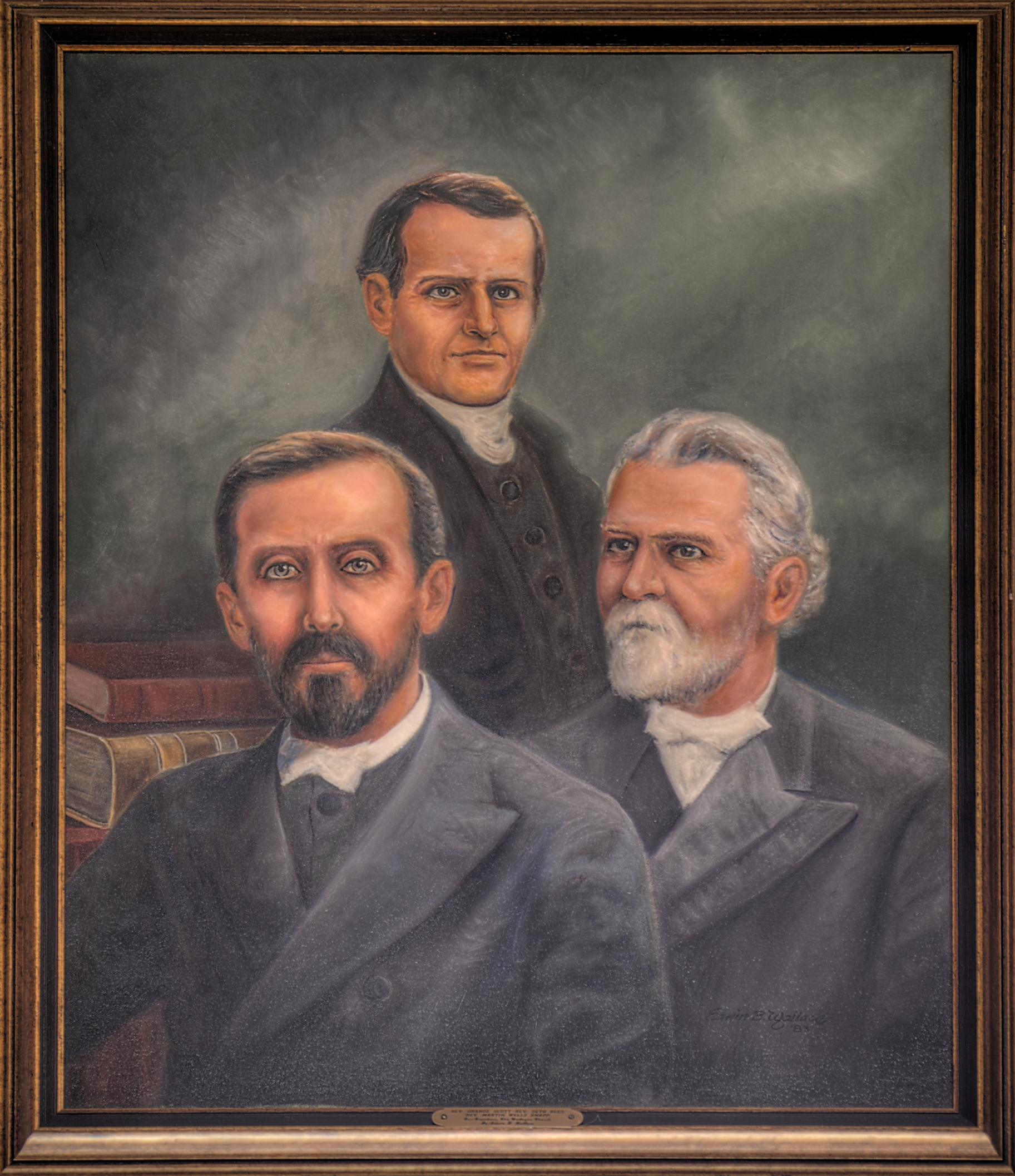
Painting of Knapp (on left), Orange Scott, and Seth Cook Rees on display at the World Methodist Museum, Lake Junaluska, NC

Martin Wells Knapp (1853–1901) was an American Methodist minister who founded several institutions including the magazine God’s Revivalist in 1888, the International Holiness Union and Prayer League (which became the Pilgrim Holiness Church) in 1897, and God's Bible School, later known as God's Bible School and College, in Cincinnati, Ohio in 1900. He was a central figure of the more radical wing of the Holiness movement.

== Biography ==
=== Younger years ===
Martin Wells Knapp was born March 27, 1853, in Albion, Michigan, to parents who lived in a log cabin. His father, Jared Knapp, was a Methodist class-leader who had come from New York to Michigan in 1836. Jared was the son of Samuel and Abigail Knapp, of Parma, Monroe County, New York. Martin's mother, Octavia, also a committed Christian, was the daughter of Melzar and Eunice Wells, of Sullivan, Madison County, New York. Martin had two half-sisters, Mrs. Letta J. Conner, who died in 1866, and Mrs. R. V. Buck, wife of Amos Buck, of Stevensville, Montana. Martin also had a brother, L. J. Knapp, who became a lawyer in Missoula, Montana. As his father's health was fragile, the young Martin had to help a lot on the farm.

=== Studies ===
Although Knapp was a shy young man, at age 17 he began studies at a Methodist college in Albion, Michigan, on the 50 dollars his parents could give him after selling a calf. He continued to work on the family farm in the summer, never stopping his studies which he carried on during the night.

Although he was always a religious boy, he had a defining experience of conversion at age 19, through the fiancée he was corresponding with, Lucy J. Glenn. Martin was converted at 19 through Lucy's prayers and his mother's example. Soon he received his call to preach. When he was 23, he and Lucy were married.

=== Ministry ===
Right after his marriage, in 1877, he went on to a career in ministry, when the Methodist Michigan Conference assigned him a circuit. He was not as loud a preacher as his father had been and was in fact very shy and unimpressive, being only 5’4" and 120 pounds and his first impression upon strangers was almost always unfavorable. But on that first pastorate, Knapp demonstrated enough qualities to be allowed to stay on board.

A turning point in Knapp’s life came on his second pastorate in November 1882. He had long been wrestling with the inner bent to sinning. Under the ministry of William Taylor, who would later become the great missionary bishop of the Methodist Church, he claimed the blessing "now" in a revival at one of his own churches, entering thereby straight into the holiness movement.

In 1886, Knapp published his first book, "Christ Crowned Within", apparently selling off some of his own furniture to finance this publication. In 1887 the Michigan Conference permitted him to step out of the pastorate so he could follow the calling of an evangelist. The following year, in his mother's kitchen, he started God’s Revivalist, a periodical devoted to the promotion of holiness.

During 1889–1890, Knapp went through a two-year period of adversity when he and his family were hit hard by disease and financial crises. The worst blow of all came on September 5, 1890, when his wife Lucy died after a long illness, leaving him with two small children.

In 1892, Knapp remarried with Minnie C. Ferle and moved to Cincinnati. During the ensuing period he impressed his biographer A. M. Hills as being "a little bundle of nerves and brain and heart, all alive and on fire for God and holiness." Judging after the results of the following years, it seems he was indeed never stopping to rest: he set up a publishing house for holiness literature in the YMCA building, established the Salvation Park Camp Meeting, and called for and initiated holiness missionary work, enlisting missionaries and through his paper and camp meeting and raising funds for them. After visiting his school Charles and Lettie Cowman changed their missionary plans from schoolteaching to evangelism, and went to Japan to establish the Oriental Missionary Society, now the One Mission Society.

In September 1897, the International Holiness Union and Prayer League was organized in Knapp's home. Seth C. Rees was elected president and Martin W. Knapp vice-president. The dozen people assembled there were intent on forming an inter-denominational society promoting holiness revivals and missions. It later became the Pilgrim Holiness Church, which would eventually help form The Wesleyan Church.

In 1900, Knapp purchased a two-acre tract of land in Cincinnati containing two large buildings and founded God's Bible School there. The following year he built a new tabernacle on the campus for his camp meeting. God's Bible School later became known as God's Bible School and College.

Knapp taught Premillennialism—that Jesus would return prior to a literal millennium—and also took seriously "special revelation" such as dreams and visions.

=== End of life ===
By early 1901 the physically overextended Knapp caught typhoid fever. His ministry continued even on his sickbed as he inquired of the nurses if they were on their way to heaven. He died in Cincinnati on December 7, 1901, at the age of 48, leaving behind him various thriving institutions, each in its own way perpetuating his influence and his message. He was buried in Spring Grove Cemetery in Cincinnati.

== Works ==
Knapp was a prolific author of books, pamphlets, and hymns; his works include:

- Christ Crowned Within (1886)
- The Double Cure
- Out of Egypt into Canaan, or Lessons in Spiritual Geography
- Diary Letters; A Missionary Trip Through the West Indies and to South America
- The River of Death and Its Branches
- Pentecostal Preachers
- Revival Kindlings (1890)
- Revival Tornadoes; or, Life and Labors of Rev. Joseph H. Weber (McDonald, Gill & Company, 1890)
- Impressions—How to Tell Whether They Are from Above or Below (Revivalist Publishing House; sixth edition, 1892)
- Tears and Triumphs, with Leander L. Pickett & John R. Bryant (Columbia, South Carolina: L. L. Pickett, 1894)
- Lightning Bolts from Pentecostal Skies; or, Devices of the Devil Unmasked (1898)
- Holiness Triumphant, or, Pearls from Patmos (1900)
- Bible Songs of Salvation and Victory, with R. E. McNeill (Cincinnati, Ohio: M. W. Knapp, circa 1902)

== Legacy ==
Martin W. Knapp's legacy is impressive in all accounts, as his message lived on and was passed on by the institutions he had founded. His flurry of activism is best explained by the division which appeared in the late 19th century within the holiness movement, "between traditionalist moderates who remained loyal to the old denominations and radicals who wanted to form new bodies committed to innovative theological currents such as the eminent physical return of Jesus and divine healing. Knapp was the central figure in the radical coalition. While holiness moderates in the National Holiness Association (NHA) attempted a two-front war against foes that they believed were either dangerous liberals or rank fanatics, Knapp focused his attention on the moderates whom he believed were hopelessly tied to such passing human documents as the Apostles Creed. Early radical centers were God’s Bible School in Cincinnati and the Chicago-based ministries of E. L. Harvey and Duke Farson."
