= Wesleyan Church =

Methodist church

The Wesleyan Church
- Classification: Protestant
- Orientation: Holiness Methodist
- Polity: Connectionalism
- General superintendent: Jim Dunne
- Associations: Christian Holiness Partnership, National Association of Evangelicals, Wesleyan Holiness Connection, World Methodist Council
- Region: Worldwide
- Headquarters: Fishers, Indiana, U.S.
- Founder: John Wesley (spiritually)
- Origin: 1843; Utica, New York, U.S.
- Merger of: Wesleyan Methodist Church and Pilgrim Holiness Church (1968); Standard Church of America (2003)
- Separations: Allegheny Wesleyan Methodist Connection (1968); Bible Methodist Connection of Churches (1968); Bible Methodist Connection of Tennessee (1968); Pilgrim Holiness Church of New York (1963); Pilgrim Holiness Church of the Midwest (1967)
- Official website: www.wesleyan.org

The Wesleyan Church, also known as the Wesleyan Methodist Church or Wesleyan Holiness Church depending on the region, is a Methodist Christian denomination headquartered in Fishers, Indiana, with congregations across North America, the United Kingdom, South Africa, Namibia, Sierra Leone, Liberia, Indonesia, and Australia. The church is aligned with the Wesleyan-Holiness movement and has roots in the teachings of British preacher John Wesley. It adheres to Wesleyan-Arminian doctrine and is a member of the World Methodist Council. Wesleyan Life is the official publication; Global Partners the official nonprofit missions organization.

In 2017, there were 140,954 members in 1,607 congregations in North America, and an average worship attendance of 239,842. In 2020, the number of congregations in the United States was 1,463.

== History ==
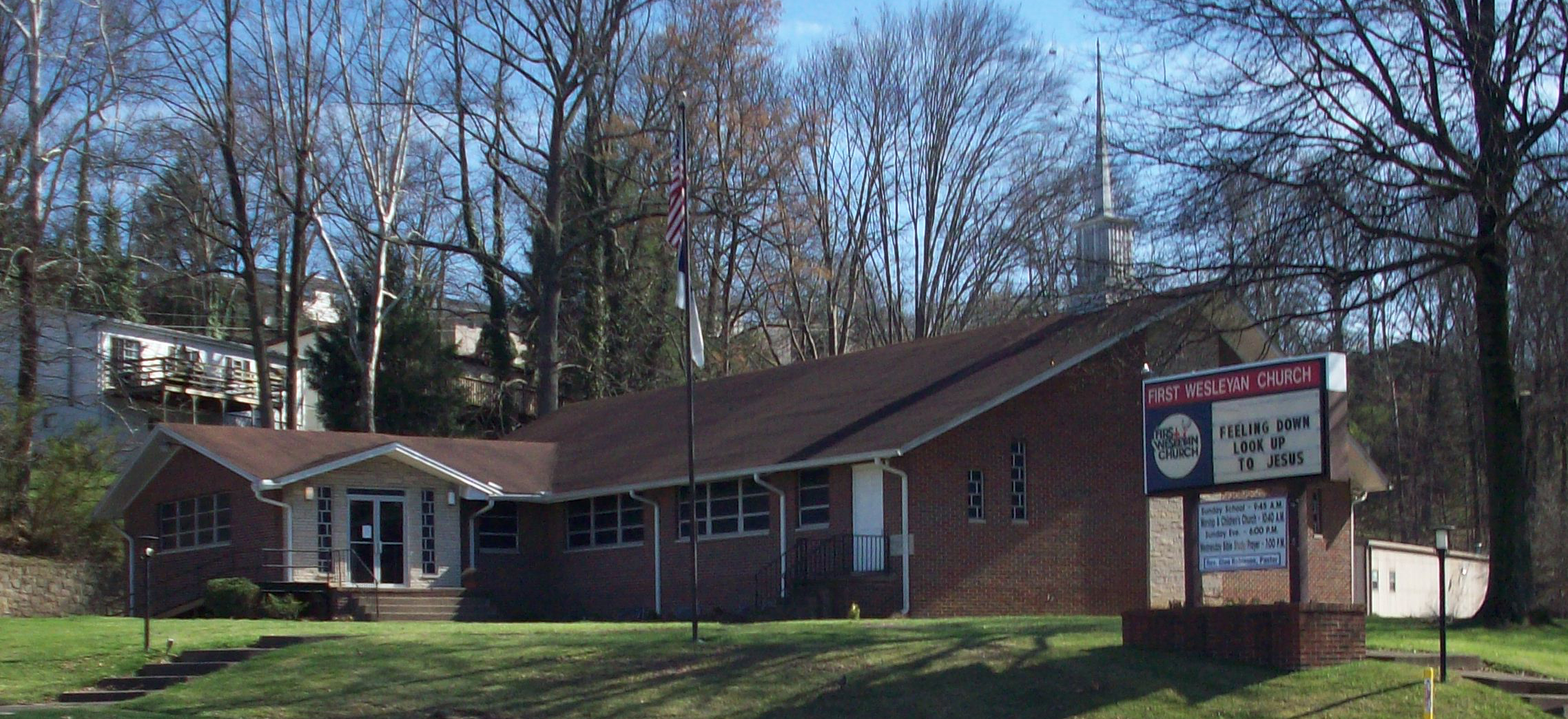
First Wesleyan Church in Huntington, West Virginia, a congregation belonging to the Wesleyan Church

The Wesleyan Methodist Connection was officially formed in 1843 at an organizing conference in Utica, New York, by a group of ministers and laymen splitting from the Methodist Episcopal Church. The split was primarily over their objections to slavery, though they had secondary issues as well, such as ecclesiastical polity. Orange Scott presided as the meeting formed a federation of churches at first calling themselves the Wesleyan Methodist Connection, a name chosen to emphasize the primacy of the local church, and the intended nature of the denomination as a connection of churches. Other leaders at the organizing conference were La Roy Sunderland, who had been tried and defrocked for his antislavery writings, Lucious C. Matlack, and Luther Lee, a minister who later operated an Underground Railroad station in Syracuse, New York.

The denomination sponsored traveling preachers on the frontier and into Canada, where they appealed to workingmen and farmers. Typical was Rev. James Caughey, an American sent to Ontario by the Wesleyan Methodist Church from the 1840s through 1864. He brought in converts by the score, most notably in the revivals in Canada West 1851–53. His technique combined restrained emotionalism with a clear call for personal commitment, coupled with follow-up action to organize support from converts. It was a time when the Holiness Movement caught fire, with the revitalized interest of men and women in Christian perfection. Caughey successfully bridged the gap between the style of earlier camp meetings and the needs of more sophisticated Methodist congregations in the emerging cities.

In addition to advocating for abolitionism, the early Wesleyan Methodists championed the rights of women. In 1848, the Wesleyan Chapel in Seneca Falls, New York, hosted the Seneca Falls Convention, the first women's rights convention. It is commemorated by the Women's Rights National Historical Park in the village today. Luther Lee, General President in 1856, preached at the ordination service of Antoinette Brown (Blackwell), the very first woman ordained to the Christian ministry in the United States. The Alliance of Reformed Baptists of Canada ordained the very first woman to the ministry in Canada in the late 1800s. At General Conference in 1867, a resolution was adopted favoring the right of women to vote (as well as the right of freedmen—blacks). This was 44 years before the US constitution was amended to ensure women voting privileges.

In 1966 the Wesleyan Methodist Church merged with the Alliance of Reformed Baptists of Canada and in 1968 with the Pilgrim Holiness Church. It spread through revivals emphasizing a deepening experience with God called holiness or sanctification. Heart purity was a central theme. During this period of time, many small churches developed through revivals and the emphasis of entire sanctification (taught by John Wesley, but not emphasized by some mainline Methodists). As many as 25 or 30 small denominations were formed and eventually merged with other groups to enlarge the church. The church was strong in missionary and revival emphasis. The merger took place in 1968 at Anderson University, Anderson, Indiana. Some conferences and local churches of the Wesleyan Methodist Church objected to the merger, thus resulting in a schism of the Allegheny Wesleyan Methodist Connection with the Wesleyan Church, as well as the creation of the Bible Methodist Connection of Churches and Bible Methodist Connection of Tennessee around 1968. The Pilgrim Holiness Church of New York (formed in 1963) and Pilgrim Holiness Church of the Midwest (formed in 1967) were also established around this time, with the former in response to the tendency of centralization of the larger Pilgrim Holiness Church and the latter in response to the merger.

== Beliefs ==
The Wesleyan Church has the following core values:

- Biblical authority
- Christlikeness
- Disciple-making
- Local church-centered
- Servant leadership
- Unity in diversity

In addition, the Wesleyan Church holds to the following articles of religion:

- Faith in the Holy Trinity — There is one true God, united in three persons: the Father, Son, and Holy Spirit.
- The Father — the Father created all things, and that all humans are created in the image of God. God, in love, seeks out and receives penitent sinners.
- The Son of God — Jesus Christ is the Son of God, conceived by the Holy Spirit, born of the Virgin Mary, fully God and fully man. He died on the cross and was buried as a sacrifice both for original sin and all human transgression and to reconcile us to God. He was raised bodily from the dead, ascended into heaven, and intercedes at the Father's right hand, until he returns to judge all humanity.
- The Holy Spirit — The Holy Spirit administers grace to all and is the agent in conviction for sin, in regeneration, in sanctification, and in glorification.
- The sufficiency and full authority of the Holy Scriptures for salvation — The Old and New Testaments are the inspired and infallible Word of God, inerrant in their original manuscripts, superior to any human authority and sufficient for all things necessary to salvation. The Bible has been transmitted to the present without corruption of any essential doctrine.
- God's Purpose for Humanity — The divine law is summarized in the commands to love God with all one's heart and to love one's neighbor as oneself. All persons, therefore, ought to seek to obey God and to preserve and promote for others the exercise of every natural right.
- Marriage and the Family — People are made in the image of God. Marriage is designed by God as a metaphor for His relationship with His covenant people. Therefore, human sexuality ought only to be expressed in heterosexual monogamy. Marriage has the highest priority among social organizations, and was divinely designed for reproduction. Extramarital and same-sex relationships are immoral and sinful.
- Personal Choice — Humans were created with the ability to choose between right and wrong. But, since the fall, humans cannot choose right on their own, because of original sin. Humans are inclined toward sin and cannot, on their own, call on God or exercise faith. But God, through Christ, provides to each person prevenient grace, allowing each to choose salvation.
- Sin: Original, Willful, and Involuntary — All of creation suffers the consequences of Adam and Eve's disobedience and groans for redemption. Each person is born with a bent toward sinning, which manifests itself in outward acts of unrighteousness. Failures in judgment and involuntary flaws are not to be equated with willful sin but still require the atonement of Christ for forgiveness. Willful sin is when a free moral agent volitionally chooses to transgress a known law of God. Such sin will result in a loss of fellowship with God, self-absorption, an inability to live righteously, and, ultimately, eternal separation from God. The atonement of Christ is the only remedy for sin, whether original, willful or involuntary.
- The Atonement — Christ's crucifixion allows redemption for the whole world. It is the only foundation of salvation from sin. The atonement covers those who mentally cannot choose salvation, but individuals who are mentally accountable must accept the gift of salvation of their own free will.
- Repentance and Faith
  - Affirms that salvation is by grace alone but must be accepted by the believer. Denies the Reformed view of unconditional election.
  - Affirms that repentance precedes saving faith.
  - Affirms that faith is the only condition for salvation. Directly negates any need for good works to attain salvation. Does not negate good works as evidence of salvation.
  - Affirms that saving faith publicly acknowledges Christ as Lord.
  - Affirms that the saved will identify with the church.
- Justification, Regeneration, and Adoption — Asserts that when one repents and has saving faith in Christ, in that same moment that person is:
  - Justified: Granted full pardon for all sin, guilt, and penalty of sins.
  - Regenerated: Reborn spiritual life in Christ with a distinct capacity for love and obedience to God.
  - Adopted: Given full rights, privileges, and responsibilities of a child of God.
- Good Works — Reaffirms that humankind is justified by faith and affirms that good works are evidence of salvation.
- Sin After Regeneration — Affirms it is possible for a believer to sin after regeneration in salvation and that there is grace and forgiveness for repentant believers.
- Sanctification
  - Initial: The work of the Holy Spirit in the moment of conversion in a new believer to be separated from sin to God.
  - Progressive: The continual work of the Holy Spirit to grow the believer in love and more perfect obedience.
  - Entire" The perfecting of the believer in love and empowerment for service. It follows in lifelong growth in grace and knowledge.
- The Gifts of the Spirit — Asserts that the Holy Spirit gives gifts to people, for the benefit of the Church, but that the Holy Spirit himself is the most desirable gift.
- The Church — The Christian Church is the entire body of believers (both living and those died and in heaven). Jesus Christ is the founder and only head of the Church, which is not identified with any particular institution or denomination. The Church is called to preach the Word of God, administer the sacraments, and live in obedience to Christ. A local church is a body of believers formally organized for the purposes of evangelism, discipleship, and worship. The Wesleyan Church is a denomination within the greater, invisible Church, and that invisible church encompasses Christians who hold to a variety of differing beliefs, not just Wesleyan beliefs.
- The Sacraments
  - Baptism — Baptism is a sacrament commanded by our Lord and administered to believers. It works as a symbol and as part of the new covenant of grace.
  - The Lord's Supper — The Lord's Supper is a sacrament of our redemption by Christ's death, our hope in his return, and a sign of Christian love for one another.
- The Second Coming of Christ — Asserts that Christ will return, fulfilling numerous biblical prophecies and that this certain event should inspire proper living and evangelization.
- Resurrection of the Dead — Asserts that all will be raised from the dead at Christ's return, damnation for the lost and life for the saved, and that the resurrection body will be a spiritual body but still personally recognizable.
- Judgment of All Persons — Asserts a final judgment for all humans before God, regardless of the individual's beliefs, and asserts God's omniscience and eternal justice.
- Destiny — Asserts that Scripture teaches there is life after death, and the fate of each person is determined by God's grace and their individual response, evidenced through moral character rather than arbitrary decree of God. Heaven and Christ's presence is the place for those who choose God's salvation given through Christ, but hell and separation from Christ is the resulting place for those who neglect the great salvation.

== Organizations and relations ==
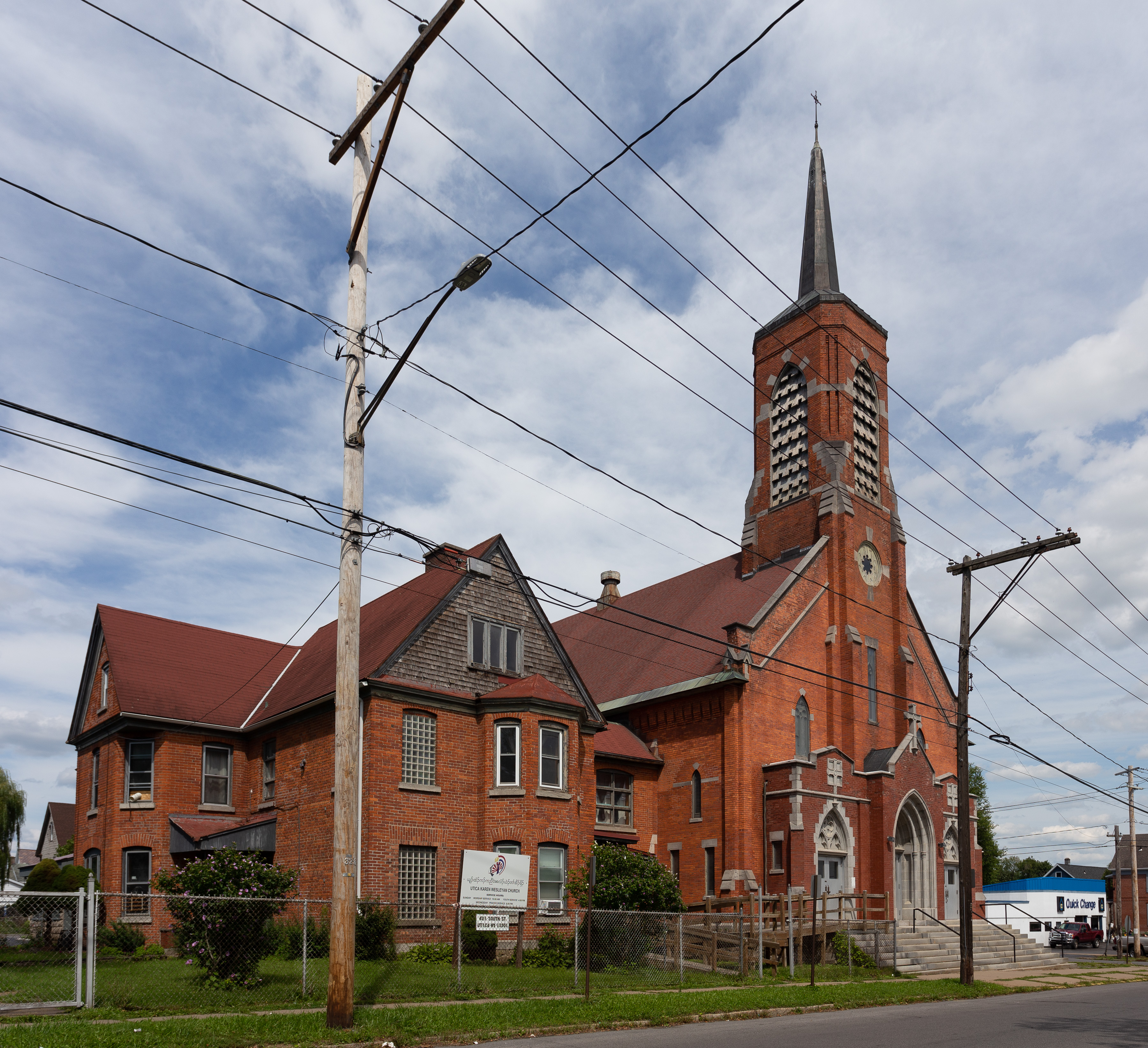
Karen refugees from Myanmar established a Wesleyan Church in Utica, New York in 2008.

Local churches are organized into a network of districts with equal representation of clergy and laity at their annual conferences. Each has an elected administrator known as the district superintendent and has a district board of administration with both lay and clergy serving. National and multi-national networks are called general conferences and meet every four years. General conferences exist in the Philippines, the Caribbeans, and North America.

=== Official names by region ===
According to the 2012 Wesleyan Church Discipline, the official name of the denomination is The Wesleyan Church. However, different names may be used by different units of the church for practicality and localization. The following are the official names of the denomination, for the various organizational units:

- Australia: The Wesleyan Methodist Church of Australia
- Bougainville: The Wesleyan Methodist Church of Bougainville
- Brazil: Igreja Evangélica Wesleyana
- British Isles: The Wesleyan Holiness Church
- Cambodia: 'The Wesleyan Church of Cambodia'
- Canada: The Wesleyan Church
- Caribbean: The Wesleyan Holiness Church of the Caribbean
- Chile: Ministerio Evangelistico y Misionero "Cristo es la Unica Respuesta"
- Colombia: La Iglesia Wesleyana de Colombia
- Costa Rica: Iglesia Wesleyana Internacional de Costa Rica
- Egypt: The Standard Wesleyan Church
- Ghana: The Standard Wesleyan Church
- Guyana: The Wesleyan Church
- Haiti: L’Eglise Wesleyenne d’Haiti
- Honduras: Mision Methodista Sión
- India, Central: The Wesleyan Methodist Church of Central India
- India, East: The Wesleyan Methodist Church of East India
- India, Western: The Wesleyan Methodist Church of Western India
- Indonesia: Gereja Wesleyan Indonesia (GWI)
- Lahore: "The Wesleyan Methodist Church in Pakistan"
- Liberia: The Wesleyan Church of Liberia
- Mexico: Iglesia Evangelica Los Peregrinos
- Mozambique: Igreja Emmanuel Evangelica Wesleyana
- Myanmar: The Wesleyan Church of Myanmar
- Namibia: The Wesleyan Church in Namibia
- New Zealand: Wesleyan Methodist Church of New Zealand
- Nicaragua: Asociación Mundial de Iglesias Wesleyanas de Nicaragua
- Pakistan: The Wesleyan Church in Pakistan
- Panamá: Iglesia Cristiana Wesleyana de Panamá
- Peru: Iglesia Wesleyana Peregrina
- Philippines: The Wesleyan Church of the Philippines
- Poland: Ewangeliczny Kościół Metodystyczny w Rzeczypospolitej Polskiej
- Puerto Rico: Iglesia Evangélica Wesleyana
- Sierra Leone: The Wesleyan Church of Sierra Leone
- South Korea: Jesus Korea Wesleyan Church
- South Africa: The Wesleyan Church of Southern Africa
- Suriname: De Wesleyaanse Gemeente
- Tonga: Free Wesleyan Church
- United States: The Wesleyan Church
- Venezuela: Iglesia Evangélica Wesleyana
- Zambia: Pilgrim Wesleyan Church of Zambia
- Zimbabwe: The Wesleyan Church

=== Sister denominations and fraternal relations ===
The Wesleyan Church is a part of the holiness movement, and as such, follows many of the same teachings as similar denominations that follow Wesleyan traditions. At times in its history, it has sought merger with both the Church of the Nazarene and the Free Methodist Church, both of which practice very similar doctrine.

The Wesleyan Church is a member of the following organizations:

- National Association of Evangelicals
- World Methodist Council

=== Seminaries, universities, colleges, and schools in the U.S. and Canada ===
Affiliated with The Wesleyan Church are five universities and one seminary:

- Houghton University (New York)
- Indiana Wesleyan University (Indiana)
- Kingswood University (New Brunswick)
- Oklahoma Wesleyan University (Oklahoma)
- Southern Wesleyan University (South Carolina)
- Wesley Seminary (Indiana)

=== Wesleyan Publishing House ===
The Wesleyan Church runs its own publishing house located in Indianapolis, Indiana. Its mission is to "be a leader in communicating the message of holiness through the publication of quality resources for local churches and ministries around the world."

=== Districts ===
The Wesleyan Church in North America is organized in the following 22 districts:

- Atlantic (New Brunswick, Nova Scotia, Prince Edward Island, Newfoundland and Labrador, and the US state of Maine)
- Central Canada (central and western Canada)
- Chesapeake (Delaware, Maryland, Northern Virginia, Washington D.C.)
- Crossroads (North and Central Indiana)
- Florida
- Great Lakes (Michigan, Illinois and Wisconsin)
- Greater Ohio
- Indiana South
- Kansas
- Kentucky-Tennessee
- Mountain Plains (Colorado, Nebraska, Texas, Louisiana, and New Mexico)
- North Carolina East
- North Carolina West
- Northeast (Eastern Pennsylvania, New Jersey, Eastern New York (including the NYC Metro Area & Long Island), Connecticut, Rhode Island, New Hampshire, Vermont & Massachusetts)
- Northwest (Alaska, Idaho, Montana, North Dakota, Oregon, South Dakota, Utah, Washington, and Wyoming)
- Pacific Southwest (California, Arizona, Nevada, Hawaii)
- Penn York (Central New York, Western Pennsylvania)
- Shenandoah (Virginia and West Virginia)
- South Carolina
- South Coastal (Georgia, Alabama, and much of Mississippi)
- Tri-state (Oklahoma, Arkansas and Missouri)
- Western New York

=== Wesleyan Church of Sierra Leone ===
John Augustus Abayomi-Cole, a creole from Freetown attended the 1887 General Conference of the Wesleyan Methodist Church of the United States. He implored the Connection to send missionaries to Sierra Leone. This led to a small mission led by Rev. Henry Johnston being dispatched there in 1889. This was the first step towards the foundation of the Wesleyan Church of Sierra Leone.

== Notable people ==
=== Academics ===
- Keith Drury – writer and professor of religion at Indiana Wesleyan University
- Ronald Enroth – Christian author and professor of sociology at Westmont College, and graduate of Houghton College
- Ken Schenck – New Testament scholar
- Laura Smith Haviland – co-founder of the first racially integrated school in Michigan, abolitionist, suffragette, "superintendent" of the Detroit Underground Railroad
- Jerry Pattengale – founder of purpose-guided education, director of Green Scholars Initiative, executive director at the Museum of the Bible in Washington, D.C., Indiana Wesleyan University graduate

=== Athletes ===
- Erik Lefebvre – goalkeeper for the Charlotte Eagles soccer team, formerly played for Houghton College
- Brandon Beachy – pitcher for the Atlanta Braves, Major League Baseball team, formerly played for Indiana Wesleyan University

=== Authors ===
- Mary Ann Lyth – English missionary, teacher, translator of the Bible into Fijian
- Lettie Burd Cowman (also known as Mrs. Charles Cowman) - author of "Streams in the Desert" (6 million copies)
- John C. Maxwell, well-known author on the subject of leadership (20 million copies of books on this topic)

=== Clergy ===
- Adam Crooks – early Wesleyan Methodist minister, responsible for a number of early church plants in the denomination.
- Frank Ritchie – Pastor of Commoners Church, A Wesleyan Methodist Community in New Zealand. "Rev. Frank is an ordained Wesleyan Methodist minister. He’s convinced that as we open our lives to the presence of God, the natural outcome is a world more tuned towards justice."
- Rufus Lumry – American circuit preacher, outspoken abolitionist and leading Illinois organizer of the Wesleyan Methodist Connection, which eventually became the Wesleyan Church.
- Jo Anne Lyon – pastor, author, international leader, founder of World Hope International, global advocate, general superintendent emeritus.
- Lettie Cowman - ordained minister, co-founder of Oriental Missionary Society (now known as "One Mission Society"), President of Oriental Missionary Society 1924 to 1949, author of devotional books "Streams in the Desert" and "Springs in the Valley"
- John C. Maxwell – prolific writer and former senior pastor at Skyline Church.
- Orange Scott – president of the convention that formed the Wesleyan Methodist Connection, which eventually became the Wesleyan Church.

=== Politicians ===
- Joseph Kofi Adda – Member of Parliament in Ghana, graduate of Indiana Wesleyan University
- Jean Breaux – Indiana state senator representing the 34th District, graduate of Indiana Wesleyan University
- Ghassan Hitto – former opposition prime minister of Syria, graduate of Indiana Wesleyan University
- Randy Truitt – Indiana state representative from the 26th District, graduate of Indiana Wesleyan University

=== Scientists and inventors ===
- Thomas Bramwell Welch – a Methodist Episcopal pastor, developed a pasteurization process to prevent grapes from fermenting, thus creating grape juice instead of wine
