= Adam Crooks (activist) =

American minister and activist (1824–1874)

Rev. Adam Crooks (May 3, 1824 – December 15, 1874) was an American Wesleyan Methodist minister who promoted total abstinence from alcohol and the abolition of slavery.

"If Orange Scott can be called the founder of the Wesleyan Methodist Connection, Adam Crooks would have to be named its perpetrator."

== "Duty Respecting the Temperance Movement" ==
Rev. Crooks wrote, "Not enough that we do our neighbor no harm. Not enough that we do him all the good we can personally. We may not innocently stand by and permit the infliction of injuries by others. These principles are fundamental to the social compact; and applied to the subject of Temperance, they

1. Forbid all agency, direct and/or indirect, in the manufacture, sale, purchase, or use of intoxicating liquors, as a beverage.
2. Require that we should do our utmost to influence all others to practice habits of strictest temperance.
3. That, by forces, both moral and legal, we prevent all others from the worse than murderous traffic in liquors that can intoxicate."

== Freedom's Hill Church ==
"In October of 1847, a Wesleyan Methodist Minister, who loved God and hated slavery accepted a call to pastor a new congregation of Southern Christians who had taken the same courageous stand in the turbulent years before the Civil War. Unwilling to wait for better weather in the spring, they broke ground during the winter months of 1847-48." "He arrived in North Carolina in October of 1847 and began an evangelistic and church organizing ministry ... A log church was built that first winter nearby in Alamance County, called 'Freedom's Hill' (although opponents nicknamed it 'Free Nigger Hill')." "Freedom's Hill Church" was the first Wesleyan Methodist church built in the South. It has been renovated, and relocated to the Southern Wesleyan University campus.

"By the end of Crook's first year, he had established eight congregations in North Carolina and Virginia, with a total of 140 members."
