= Pilgrim Holiness Church =

Christian Holiness Denomination

- Classification: Methodism
- Orientation: Conservative holiness movement
- Polity: Connexionalism
- Associations: Interchurch Holiness Convention
- Origin: 1897
- Separated from: Methodist Episcopal Church (1897)
- Separations: Evangelical Methodist Church Conference (1927); Emmanuel Association (1937)
- Merged into: Wesleyan Church (1968)
- Official website: Pilgrim Holiness Church (Midwest); Pilgrim Holiness Church of New York

Pilgrim Holiness Church (PHC) or International Apostolic Holiness Church (IAHC) is a Methodist Christian denomination associated with the holiness movement that split from the Methodist Episcopal Church through the efforts of Martin Wells Knapp in 1897. It was first organized in Cincinnati, Ohio, as the International Holiness Union and Prayer League (IHU/IAHC). Knapp, founder of the IAHC, ordained and his Worldwide Missions Board sent Charles and Lettie Cowman who had attended God's Bible School to Japan in December 1900. By the International Apostolic Holiness Churches Foreign Missionary Board and the co-board of the Revivalist the Cowmans had been appointed the General Superintendents and the Kilbournes the vice-General Superintendent for Korea, Japan and China December 29, 1905. The organization later became the Pilgrim Holiness Church in 1922, the majority of which merged with the Wesleyan Methodists in 1968 to form the Wesleyan Church.

In 1937, the Emmanuel Association was formed as a result of a schism with the Pilgrim Holiness Church; it became one of the first denominations of the conservative holiness movement.

Today, two groups of Pilgrim Holiness churches still exist from the secession of the merger in 1968-the Pilgrim Holiness Church, Inc. (of the Midwest) and the Pilgrim Holiness Church of NY, Inc. These two groups are not associated with the Wesleyan Church today but align themselves with the Conservative Holiness Movement. Among many other Holiness children, the Korea Holiness Church, daughter of the IAHC/PHC, has approximately 10,000 churches globally and two million members in the four holiness denominations in 2010.

== History 1897-1968 ==
The Pilgrim Holiness Church came into being as a result of the revival of scriptural holiness that swept across the various denominations in America in the last half of the nineteenth century, the same awakening that had rechanneled the energies of the Wesleyan Methodist Connection from social and political reform to holiness evangelism. The awakening crystallized in the establishment of many nondenominational and interdenominational holiness unions and associations and independent churches. Toward the close of the nineteenth century many of like faith began to draw together.

=== International Holiness Union and Prayer League ===
A focal point for the beginning of The Pilgrim Holiness Church as an organization was the formation of the International Holiness Union and Prayer League in September 1897, at Cincinnati, Ohio, in the home of Martin Wells Knapp. Rev. Seth C. Rees was chosen President, and Rev. Martin Wells Knapp, Vice-President. The Union was not thought of as a church, nor intended as such, but was an interdenominational fellowship, marked by simplicity and the absence of restrictions. The primary purpose of the Union was to unite holiness people in promotion of worldwide holiness evangelism. A fourfold emphasis was declared concerning the regeneration of sinners, the entire sanctification of believers, the premillennial and imminent return of the Lord Jesus Christ, and the evangelization of the world. The Union met the need of many people for fellowship and cooperation in the spread of scriptural holiness and grew rapidly. Extensive revival work was carried on by members of the Union, resulting in the formation of the many city missions, churches, rescue homes, and camp meetings.

=== International Apostolic Holiness Union ===
In the annual meeting of the Union held in July 1900, the name was changed to International Apostolic Holiness Union in order to express more fully the aim of promoting a return to apostolic principles and practices. Also in 1900 the foreign missionary work began as members of the Union went out as faith missionaries to South Africa, India, Japan [Korea], the West Indies, and South America.

=== International Apostolic Holiness Church ===
The Union gradually developed into a church organization in order to provide church homes for the converts and the conservation of the work. In 1905 the name was changed to International Apostolic Holiness Union and Churches. At the General Assembly of 1905 the Foreign Missionary Board and the co-board of the Revivalist had appointed Charles and Lettie Cowman the General Superintendent and Edwin A. Kilbourne the Vice-General Superintendent for Korea, Japan and China. The interdenominational features also faded out, and in 1913 the name was altered to International Apostolic Holiness Church. Its doctrine was decidedly Wesleyan Methodist.

In 1919, the Indiana, Illinois-Missouri, and Kansas-Oklahoma Conferences of the Holiness Christian Church were received by the General Assembly of the International Apostolic Holiness Church. The Holiness Christian Church had its beginning in a revival movement around Philadelphia, Pennsylvania, in 1882, and was organized at Linwood, Pennsylvania, in 1889 as the Holiness Christian Association. By 1919 it was known as the Holiness Christian Church and was composed of four conferences; it also sponsored a missionary work in Central America.

The Pentecostal Rescue Mission joined the International Holiness Church in March 1922, and became the New York District. It had originated at Binghamton, New York, in 1897, and had spread until it included missions, rescue work, camp meetings, orphanage activities, churches, and a missionary work in Alaska.

=== The Pilgrim Holiness Church ===
In October 1922, the General Assembly, in special session, received The Pilgrim Church of California and adopted the name, The Pilgrim Holiness Church. The Pilgrim Church was first organized on May 27, 1917, as the Pentecost-Pilgrim Church in Pasadena, California. By 1922, a school known as Pilgrim Bible School had been established and a periodical was being published at Pasadena, California, and missionaries had been sent out to Mexico.

In 1924, a group of several churches known as the Pentecostal Brethren in Christ united with and became part of the Ohio District of The Pilgrim Holiness Church.

In 1925, The People's Mission Church, with headquarters at Colorado Springs, Colorado, became part of The Pilgrim Holiness Church. It was the outgrowth of revival work that began in 1898 in Colorado Springs and spread through several surrounding states. A Bible school was operated, a periodical published, and a camp meeting maintained at Colorado Springs.

In 1946, The Holiness Church of California was received by the General Conference into The Pilgrim Holiness Church. The Church, which began in a revival movement in 1880 and was first known as The Holiness Bands, maintained a Bible school at El Monte, California, and a growing missionary work in Peru and Palestine.

The Africa Evangelistic Mission, with headquarters at Boksburg, Transvaal, South Africa, was received by The Pilgrim Holiness Church in 1962. The Mission carried on work organized into three districts, two of which were located in the Orange Free State and Transvaal in the Republic of South Africa, and a third district comprising extensive work in Mozambique.

The growth of the Pilgrim Holiness Church continued through revival work and evangelism in greater measure than by the uniting of other bodies. An important turning point in the organizational structure was reached in 1930 when the General Assembly unified the administration of the denomination by providing for one general superintendent, one general board, and a general headquarters at Indianapolis, Indiana. In 1958 a plan for three general superintendents was inaugurated. In 1962 the general conference, known until 1942 as the General Assembly, was designated as the International Conference in recognition of the growth and development of the overseas work.

The original purpose of the founders of The Pilgrim Holiness Church to promote worldwide holiness evangelism remained an indelible characteristic. Missionary work was carried on in many lands, and The Pilgrim Holiness Church extended beyond the United States and Canada to the following places: South Africa, including Natal, Transvaal, Cape Province, and Orange Free State; Swaziland; Mozambique; Zambia; the Caribbean area, including Grand Cayman, Jamaica, St. Croix, St. Thomas, Saba, St. Kitts, Nevis, Antigua, Barbuda, Barbados, St. Vincent, Trinidad and Tobago, and Curaçao; Guyana; Suriname; Brazil; Peru; Mexico; Philippine Islands; and England.

In 1937, the Emmanuel Association was formed as a result of a schism with the Pilgrim Holiness Church (PHC) spearheaded by Ralph Goodrich Finch, the PHC General Superintendent of Foreign Missions; it became one of the first denominations of the conservative holiness movement.

Merger between The Pilgrim Holiness Church and The Wesleyan Methodist Church of America was proposed at various times, and was voted upon by the General Conferences of the two bodies in 1958 and 1959, failing to pass in the Wesleyan Methodist General Conference by a margin of a single vote. In 1962, the General Conference of The Pilgrim Holiness Church took action expressing renewed interest in union with The Wesleyan Methodist Church. In 1963, the General Conference of The Wesleyan Methodist Church took like action, instructing its Committee on Church Union to pursue its work with all due diligence. On June 15, 1966, the Thirty-Second General Conference of The Wesleyan Methodist Church adopted The Basis for Merger and Constitution, and subsequently the annual conferences and local churches ratified the action. On June 16, 1966, the Twenty-Fifth International Conference of The Pilgrim Holiness Church also adopted The Basis for Merger and Constitution. Thus the formation of The Wesleyan Church was authorized. The General Board of The Pilgrim Holiness Church and the General Board of Administration of The Wesleyan Methodist Church cooperated in planning the uniting General Conference, and in preparing the new book of Discipline for its consideration. On June 26, 1968, The Pilgrim Holiness Church and The Wesleyan Methodist Church of America were united to form The Wesleyan Church.

== Pilgrim Holiness Church, Inc. (Midwest), Est. 1966 ==
In 1966, the pastors of two small Pilgrim Holiness Churches in Illinois felt the need to withdraw from the formal organization which, in their opinion, seemed to smother their love for Godliness and holy living.

In December of that year, Rev. Eugene Gray informed his Bloomington, Ill., church that he was resigning and leaving the denomination, and that they were free to do whatever they felt they should. The Church felt this should be a church decision, and set the date for the membership vote. During the last week of December, the church voted to withdraw from the denomination.

During this same year in Decatur, Illinois, Pastor James Southerland was also making decisions. The Board had voted unanimously not to go with the merger, and in January 1967, the church body voted against it also. A Statement of Purpose was drawn up and presented to the Church for its consideration. This Statement was addressed to the Council of the Illinois District and was speaking to three aspects of the issue. They felt, first of all, that spiritually they would not benefit due to the trend of worldliness and wavering from the standards and convictions of the Founding Fathers.

Secondly, they asked the Council to consider letting the Illinois District as a whole be excluded from the merger. If this was not possible, the Decatur church was willing to stand alone. Thirdly, they asked for a clear title to their property. If these requests were not granted the Church was still standing against the merger and would withdraw from the General Church. After meeting with the Council and a lawsuit, the Decatur Church was able to purchase their property from the General Church, but the Bloomington Church chose not to do so, and purchased the property where they are now worshipping.

These two churches at Decatur, Illinois, and Bloomington, Illinois, considered becoming a part of the New York group, but felt that due to geographical separation, it would be better to form a self-supporting group, and work in cooperation with the New York body. In December 1966 a committee was formed by the council of the New York Pilgrim Holiness Church, Inc. Rev. Eugene Gray was appointed as Chairman. Rev. James Southerland was appointed Secretary; Rev. John Yount, as Advisor. They petitioned the N. Y. PHC to organize an autonomous conference in the midwest.

Thus, the first five churches to join were:

- Bloomington, ILL (Pastor: Rev. Eugene Gray)
- Decatur, ILL (Pastor: Rev. James Southerland)
- Evansville, IN (Pastor: Rev. John Yount)
- Petersburg, IN (Pastor: Rev. James Sneed)
- Franklin, IN (Pastor: Rev. Don Walden)

A new organization known as the Midwest Conference of the Pilgrim Holiness Church of New York, was then begun. June 16–25, 1967, the 1st annual Camp Meeting was held indoors at the Decatur Pilgrim Holiness Church located at 2615 Prairie Ave. Rev. Victor Glenn (Director of Faith Missions, Bedford, IN) & Rev. James McLaren (Evangelist- Binghamton, N.Y.) were the evangelists. Mrs. Shirley Gray and Paul Gray provided special singing. Rev. Eugene Gray served as Chairman and Rev. James Southerland as Host Pastor.

The purpose for this camp meeting was to unify the Churches and to bring them together for fellowship. By the time the 1st conference was held in August 1967, five other churches had joined the group. The 1st Conference Session was held at the Illiana Camp Ground in Terre Haute, IN, on August 26, 1967. The Holy Spirit placed His seal of approval upon the conference from the opening prayer. Shouts arose from the congregation and numerous testimonies were given as the glory of the Lord descended upon His people.

The following men were elected to serve as the first Conference Council:

- Rev. Eugene Gray (President)
- Rev. James Sneed (Vice President)
- Rev. J. A. Southerland (Secretary)
- Rev. C. Marion Brown (Treasurer)
- Rev. John Yount (Advisory Council Member)
- Rev. Ed Shemalia (Advisory Council Member)

By 1971, the Conference had become an autonomous body. The next year they reorganized as the Pilgrim Holiness Church, Incorporated, dropping the phrase "Of the Midwest" from their charter. They also drafted their own discipline, instead of using that of the New York Pilgrims.

== Pilgrim Holiness Church of NY, Inc. Est. 1963 ==
The New York Pilgrims trace their organizational roots back to 1897, when first organized as the Pentecostal Rescue Mission of Binghamton, New York. For a time this growing group of churches shared organizational ties with larger denominational groups, but joined the Pilgrim Holiness Church in 1922. In 1963 the New York District seceded from the Pilgrim Holiness Church and once more became an independent organization, and now the Conference has about 35 churches.

== Doctrine ==
In doctrine and practice they are conservative evangelicals of Wesleyan Methodist persuasion, who believe the Bible is the only written word of God, with the original text inspired by God and without error.

They believe the Creator God has revealed Himself to us in three persons: the Father, Son, and Holy Spirit. They believe in the necessity of personal salvation by grace through faith in the atoning blood of Jesus Christ.

They believe that the Holy Spirit is instrumental in leading a believer to recognize the need of holiness of heart, wrought instantaneously as a second definite work of grace when one's will is yielded to God's, therefore making it possible for him to perfectly love God with all his heart, soul, mind and strength.

They believe in the imminent return of Jesus Christ for the taking away of the universal Church of God.

== The Korea Holiness Church as the Daughter of IAHC ==
Among many other Holiness children, the Korea Holiness Church (KHC), daughter of the IAHC/PHC since 1905, emphasizes on a Full Gospel or the four-fold gospel mottos: regeneration, the baptism with Holy Spirit as the entire sanctification, divine healing and the second coming of Jesus with doing home evangelism and sending overseas missionaries. The KHC has approximately 10,000 churches globally and two million members in the four Korean holiness denominations in 2010. Seoul Theological University, organ of the Korea Evangelical Holiness Church (KEHC 8,000 churches and 0.8 million members), has 5,000 students. Sung Kyul (Holiness) University, organ of Korea Jesus Holiness Church, separated from KEHC 1961, has 9,000 students. Korea Nazarene University, organ of the KNHC, separated from KEHC in 1948, has 7,000 students. Korea Church of God, separated from KEHC in 1936 has 100 holiness churches in Korea.
