= Little York, Ohio =

- Unincorporated community
- Location within Ohio Location within the United States
- Coordinates: 39°51′31″N 84°15′29″W
- Country: United States
- State: Ohio
- County: Montgomery
- Township: Butler
- Elevation: 833 ft (254 m)
- Time zone: UTC-05:00 (EST)
  - Summer (DST): UTC-04:00 (EDT)
- ZIP Code: 45414 (Dayton)
- GNIS feature ID: 1065012

Little York is an unincorporated community in Butler Township, Montgomery County, Ohio, United States. It is located on the east bank of the Stillwater River, at the intersection of Little York Road and Meeker Road, not far from the intersection of I-70 and Ohio State Route 48.

== History ==
Little York was platted in 1817 by Andrew Waymire. A post office in the community called Little York was established in 1824, the name was changed to Littleyork in 1895, and the post office closed in 1901. Besides the post office, Little York had a mill and distillery.
