= Bible Methodist Connection of Tennessee =

- Classification: Methodism
- Orientation: Holiness movement
- Polity: Connexionalism
- Associations: Interchurch Holiness Convention (IHC)
- Origin: 1968
- Separated from: Wesleyan Methodist Church (1968)
- Separations: Bible Holiness Church
- Official website: tennesseebiblemethodists.org

The Bible Methodist Connection of Tennessee is a Methodist Christian denomination associated with the holiness movement. The Wesleyan Methodist Church was formed in 1843 as a voice of opposition to slavery views held by the Methodist Episcopal Church. However, over time, the Wesleyan Methodist Church also began to make changes that prompted a further separation by the people who came to form the Bible Methodist Connection of Tennessee. The Bible Methodist Connection of Tennessee today aligns itself in many ways with the Conservative Holiness Movement.

== History, 1968 to Present ==
=== Formation of the Connection ===
The Bible Methodist Connection of Tennessee was formed over what many believed was a liberalization of the Wesleyan Methodist Church. "Holiness as a doctrine still adorned the pages of its Book of Discipline, but holiness in practice and true holiness standards became a very rare thing."^{1} Also there was disagreement concerning the organization of the denomination. Those who sided with the Wesleyan Methodist Church wished to transition to a strong, centralized government while those who eventually formed the Tennessee Connection favored retaining the loose "connection" of like minded churches known through much of Wesleyan Methodist history. D. P. Denton and his conservative sympathizers met in Knoxville, Tennessee in 1966 to discuss the formation of a new connection with more individual church autonomy. "The new group would continue the use of Wesleyan Methodist Discipline...with the exception that each church would be completely autonomous." ^{2} "When the General Leaders of the Wesleyan Methodist Church entered into a number of lawsuits against Conferences and Local Churches of their own denomination, the Tennessee Conference (chartered by the State of Tennessee) had no choice but to withdraw its fellowship from the denomination."^{3} Following a series of Conference Meetings, the reorganization became final on May 4, 1968.

The officers of the reorganized Connection were:

- D. P. Denton, President
- W. G. Harwell, Vice President
- Mary Jane Biddle, Secretary
- Carl Johnson, Treasurer

"The Board of Managers was so composed that each section of the Connection had representation and no one group could become dominant."

In March 1987, after 35 years as president, D. P. Denton resigned and formed a small group called the Bible Methodist Fellowship. Earl Newton became president. Since Earl Newton retired in 2003, the presidency has been held for shorter time periods by Gerald Wright, Leroy Archibald and Richard Midkiff. Pastor Dale Chapman was elected president of the Connection in 2017.

== Doctrine ==
The Bible Methodist Connection of Tennessee would be characterized as a conservative evangelical denomination holding to the Wesleyan-Arminian persuasion and believe that the Bible is the inspired, inerrant Word of God. They believe in the second coming of Jesus Christ, and affirm their faith in the "literal creation of man by the immediate creative act of God."

They affirm their faith in the doctrine of regeneration, or the "new birth" by which the sinner becomes a child of God through faith in Jesus Christ.

A key affirmation of faith is their belief in the doctrine of entire sanctification by which work of grace the heart is cleansed by the Holy Spirit from all inbred sin through faith in Jesus when the believer presents himself a living sacrifice, holy and acceptable unto God and is enabled through grace to love God with all his heart and to walk in His holy commandments blameless. By the act of cleansing it is to be interpreted and taught by the ministry and teachers that is not a “suppression” or a “counteraction” of “liberated sin” so as to “make it imperative”, but to “destroy” or “to eradicate” from the heart so that the believer not only has a right to heaven, but is so conformed to God's nature that he will enjoy God and heaven forever. These terms are what we hold that that cleansing from all sin implies.

== Missions and Camps ==
Bible Methodist Missions have been primarily represented in New Mexico and Mexico. In 1983, Diné Mission was founded by Don and Nona Phoebus in Gallup, New Mexico. The Connection has actively supported this mission since its founding.

The annual connectional camp meeting and conference are held in Knoxville, Tennessee at the connectional campgrounds. Another Bible Methodist Camp, Salisbury Bible Methodist Camp, has also been held for many years in Salisbury, North Carolina.

== Commonly mistaken identity ==
The Bible Methodist Connection of Tennessee, Inc. is commonly mistaken to be part of or associated with the Bible Methodist Connection of Churches. Though they share many similar characteristics, the two groups have never been a single, affiliated organization. Both groups separated from the Wesleyan Methodist Connection as individual entities.

== Growth of the Connection ==
There are currently sixteen churches in four states and one foreign country (Tennessee, North Carolina, Virginia, New Mexico, and Mexico.)

== Resources ==
- Bible Methodist Journal (current).
- Bible Methodist of Tennessee Manual, 1998.
- Chapman, Dale (president).
- "Encyclopedia of American Religions," Melton.
- Dine Mission.
- "Radical Righteousness: The Development of the Holiness Movement," Thornton.
