= Francis W. Wilson =

American architect

Francis W. Wilson (1870–1947) was an American architect. His practice in Santa Barbara, California included work for the Atchison, Topeka and Santa Fe Railway and its associated Fred Harvey Company hotels, as well as many residences.

== Life and career ==
Wilson was born in Massachusetts and arrived in California at the age of 17 to visit his sister, a schoolteacher in Placerville. There, he worked as a log-driver on the American River and then as a surveyor for the Southern Pacific Railroad. He moved to San Francisco in the early 1890s, becoming a draftsman for the firm of Pissis and Moore, where he was instructed by architect Albert Pissis. Wilson studied at the San Francisco chapter of the American Institute of Architects and took a grand tour of Europe before establishing his own firm in Santa Barbara in 1895.

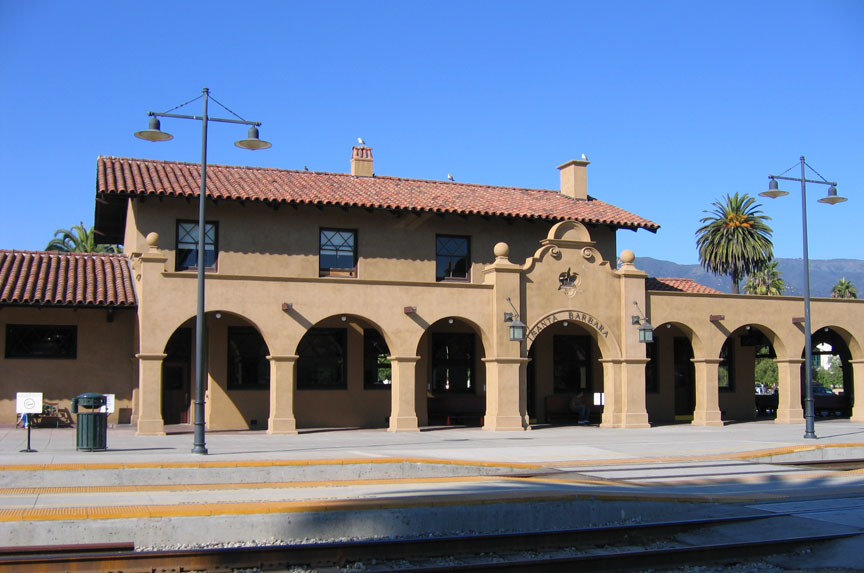
Santa Barbara Railway Station

Shortly after arriving in Santa Barbara, Wilson designed homes for Dr. C.C. Park and General Henry J. Strong. He built up a practice designing homes for the wealthy, as well as designing, building and selling speculative houses. His connections with the wealthy led to an interest in polo and amateur horse racing, and to commissions for the Santa Barbara Club, the Central Savings Bank, the Santa Barbara library, post office, and railroad station. A friendship with Edward Payson Ripley, president of the Santa Fe Railway, led to commissions for the railway and for the Fred Harvey Company, as well as a commission to design Ripley's winter home. His most extravagant residential commission, Las Tejas in the suburb of Montecito, was built in 1917 for Oakleigh Thorne.

Wilson married Julia Redington, sister of Wilson's friend and fellow Santa Barbara Polo Club member Lawrence Redington, in 1905.

In 1920, Wilson purchased a forty-five acre ranch in Tuolumne County, California, as well as a nearby mining company. Shortly thereafter, he divorced Redington. During the 1930s, Wilson designed several houses in or near Sonoma, California. During World War II, he took a position as a designer for at Lockheed Aircraft's plant in Burbank, California.

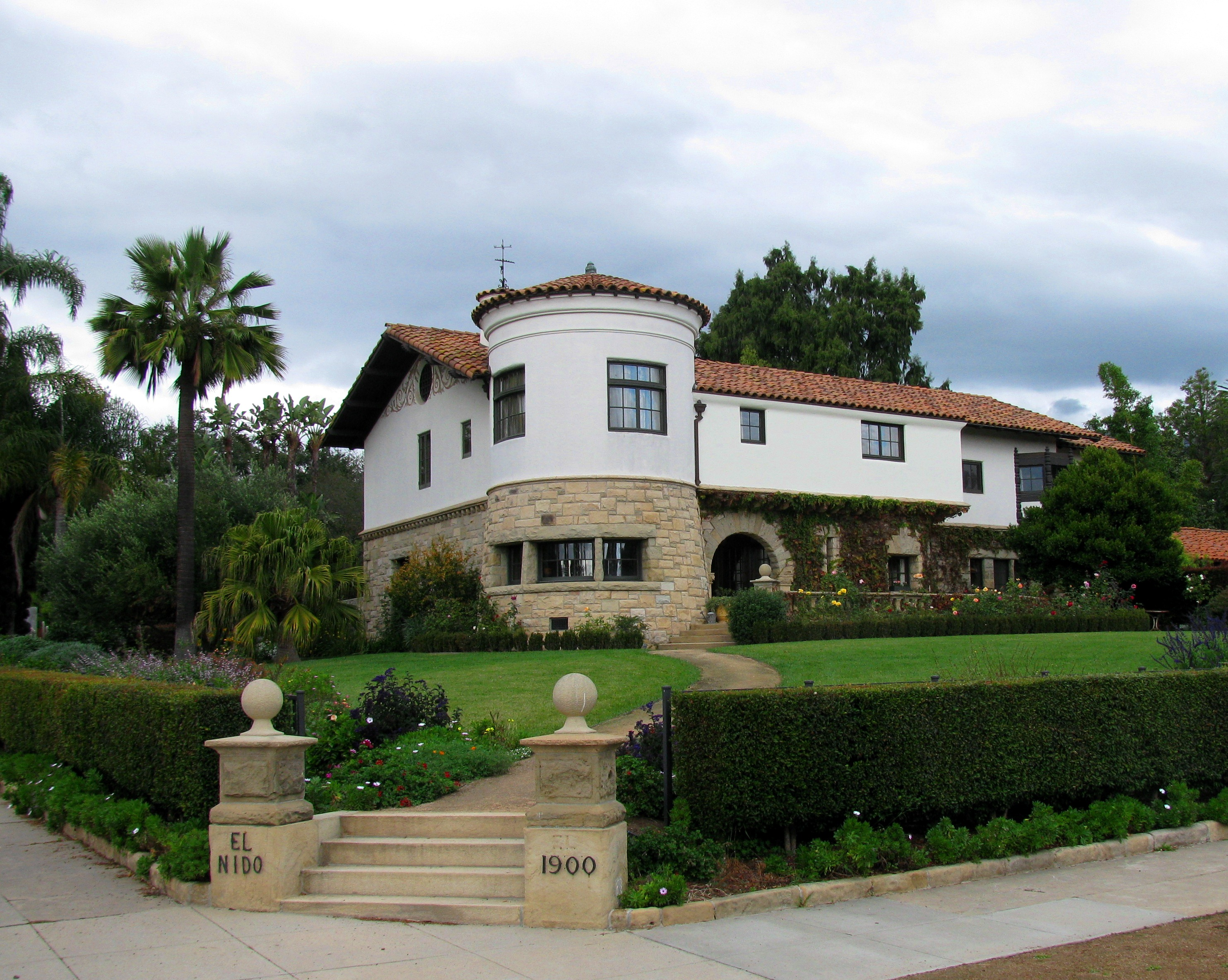
Hopkins Home, Santa Barbara, 1897; Francis W. Wilson. At least two renovations since, one of which likely restored it close to its original look

== Works ==
- Charles H. Hopkins Home ("El Nido") (1897), Santa Barbara, California
- Santa Barbara Club (1903), Santa Barbara, California
- Bellosguardo (1904), the Graham home in Santa Barbara, California, demolished 1933 and replaced by a new Bellosguardo, the estate of William A. Clark.
- Santa Barbara Railway Station (1905), Santa Barbara, California, commissioned by Southern Pacific Railroad, listed on the NRHP
- Alexander House, Santa Barbara, California (1906)
- Peter H. Murphy Home ("El Tejado") (1907), Santa Barbara, California, now Kerrwood Hall, Westmont College
- Potter Theater (1907), Santa Barbara, California, destroyed in 1925 earthquake
- El Garces Hotel (1908), a Harvey House hotel in Needles, California, listed on the NRHP
- Seth Cook Rees Home (1908), Pasadena, California
- Santa Barbara Country Club ("Miraflores") (1909), Montecito, California, rebuilt 1913, altered 1915 by Reginald D. Johnson) now the Music Academy of the West
- Bright Angel Camp (1909), Grand Canyon, Arizona, a conversion of the Bright Angel Hotel and the Buckey O'Neill Cabin for the Fred Harvey Company, now part of the Bright Angel Lodge complex designed by Mary Colter
- Grand Canyon Depot (1910), Arizona, a National Historic Landmark
- Barstow Train Depot ("Casa del Desierto") (1911), a Harvey House located at 685 North First Street, Barstow, California
- Central Savings Bank (1913), Corner of State and de la Guerre, Santa Barbara, California, destroyed in 1925 earthquake
- Santa Barbara Post Office (1914), Santa Barbara, California, now the Santa Barbara Museum of Art (with Oscar Wenderoth, Office of the Supervising Architect), remodeled 1941 by David Adler
- Santa Barbara Public Library (1917), Santa Barbara, California
- Oakleigh Thorne House ("Las Tejas") (1917), Montecito, California, redesign/remodel of estate originally built in 1868)

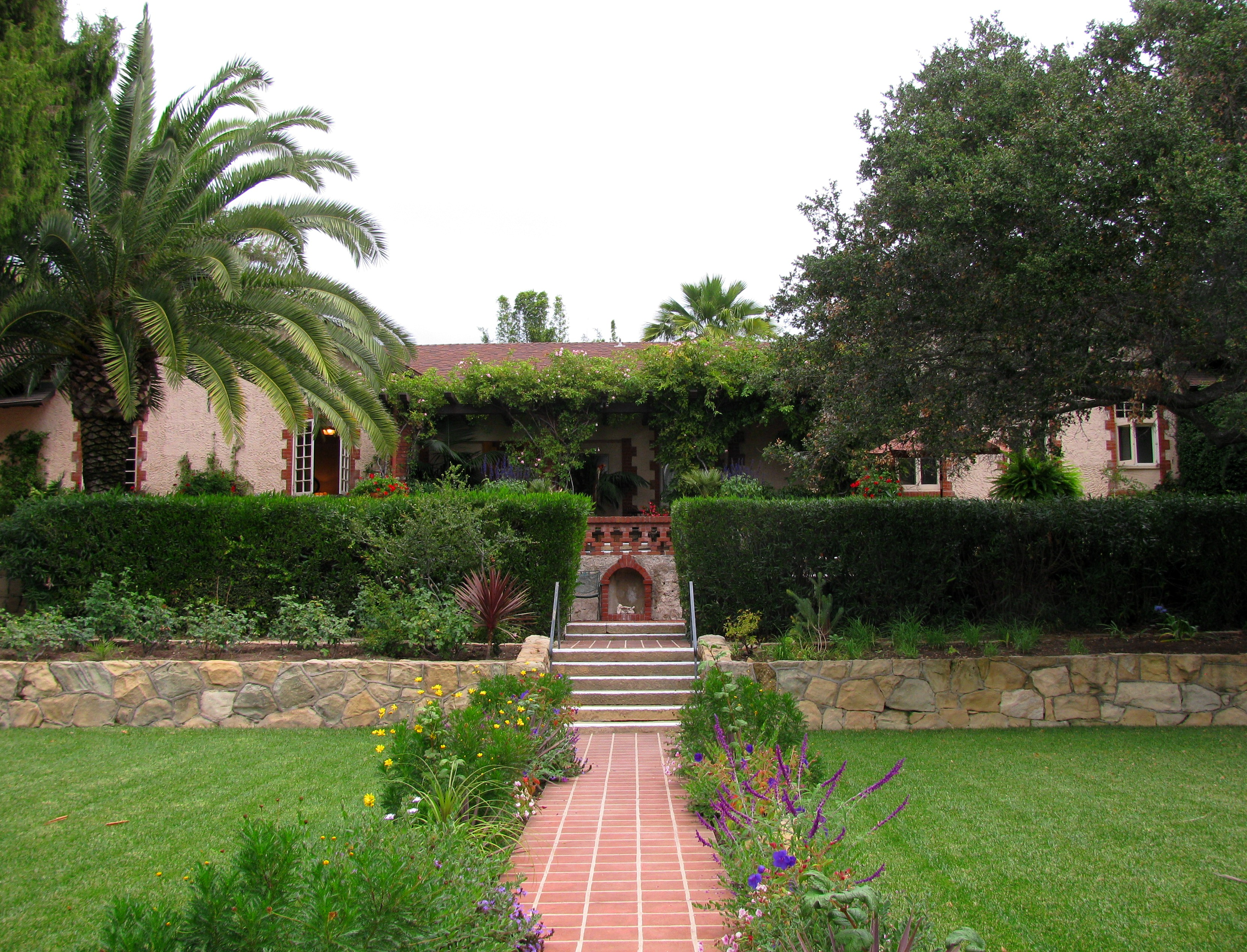
Alexander Gardens, Santa Barbara, 1906; Francis W. Wilson. Currently a senior living facility

== Gallery ==
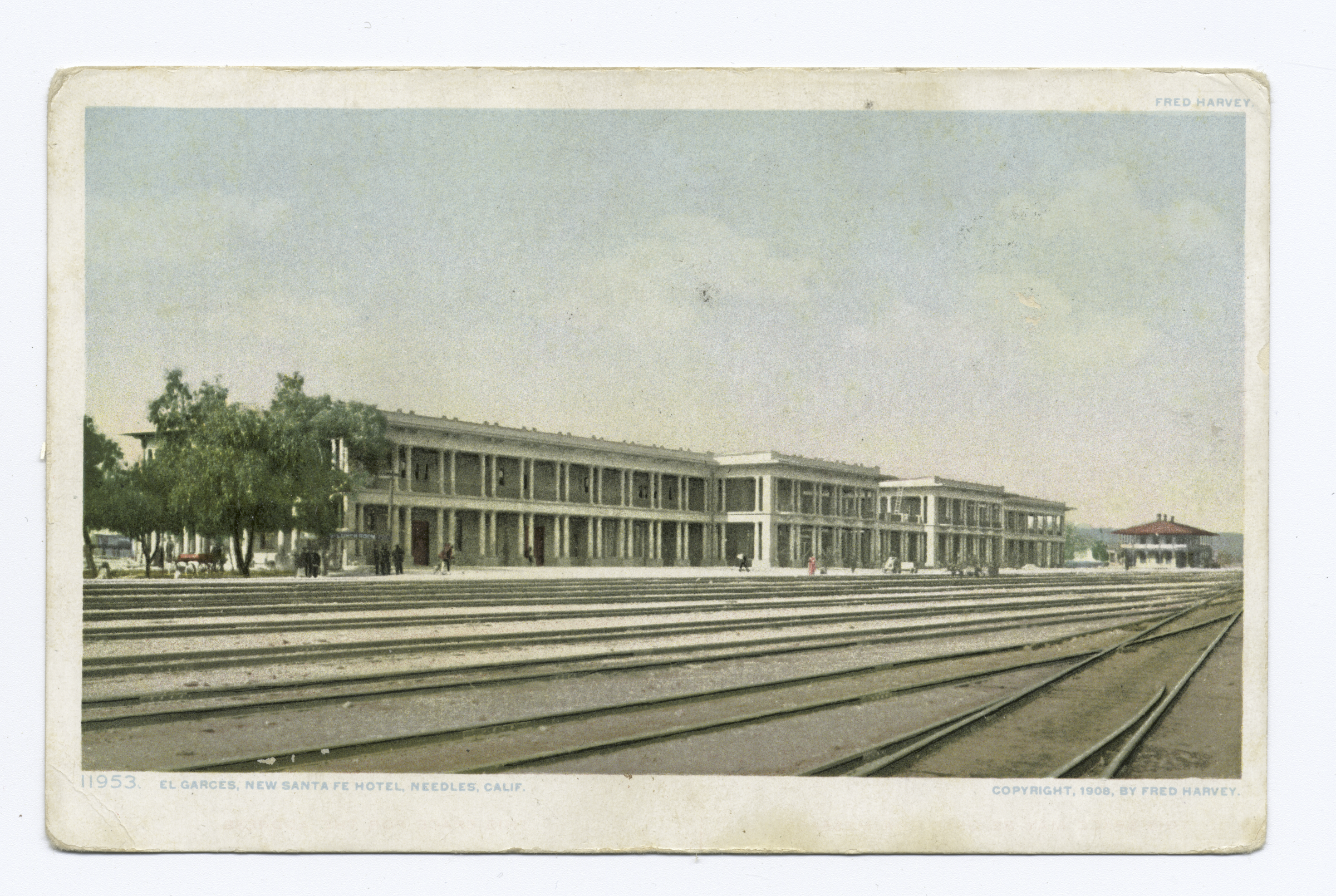
El Garces Hotel, Atchison, Topeka & Santa Fe Railroad, Needles, California

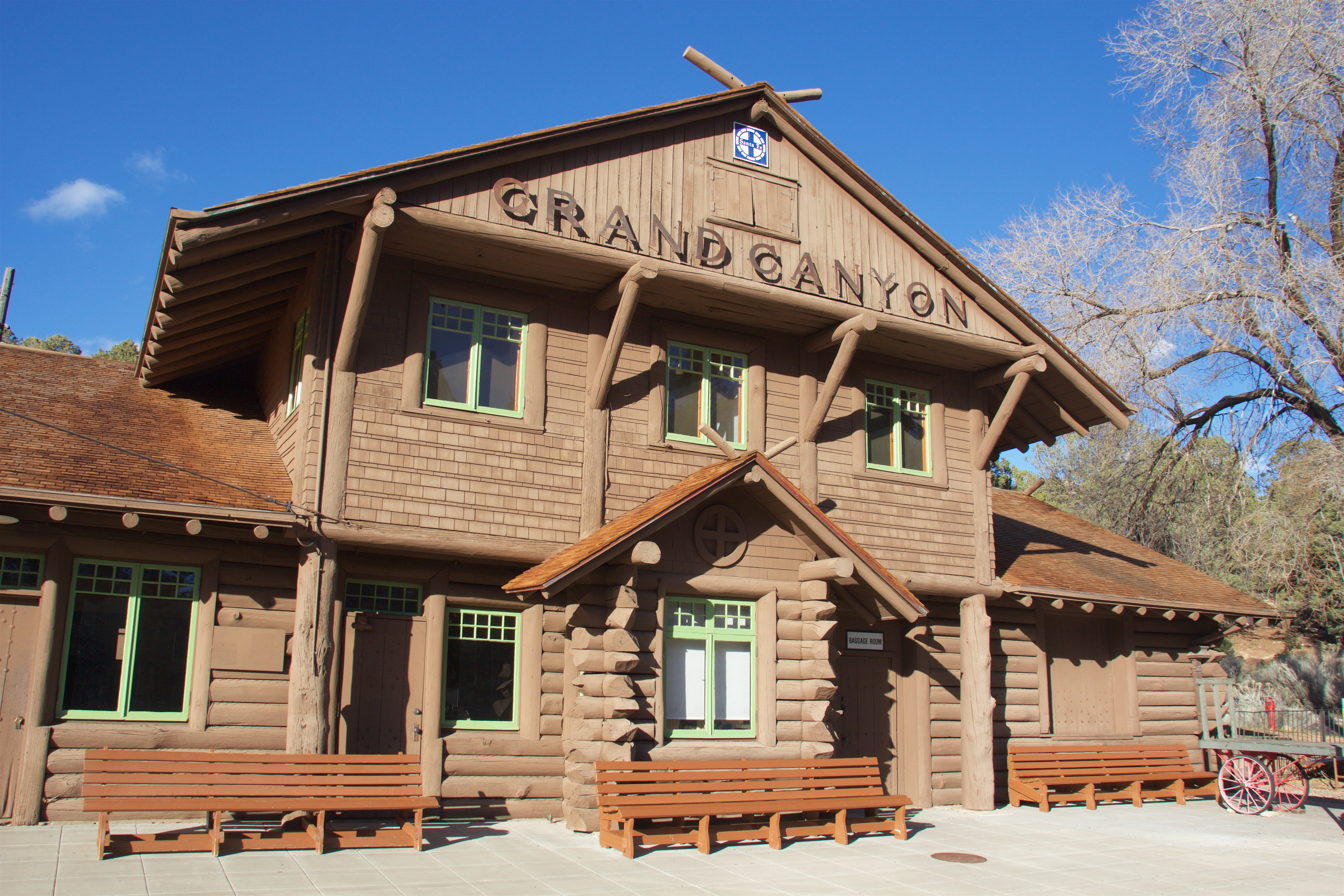
Grand Canyon Station, Atchison, Topeka & Santa Fe Railroad, Grand Canyon, Arizona

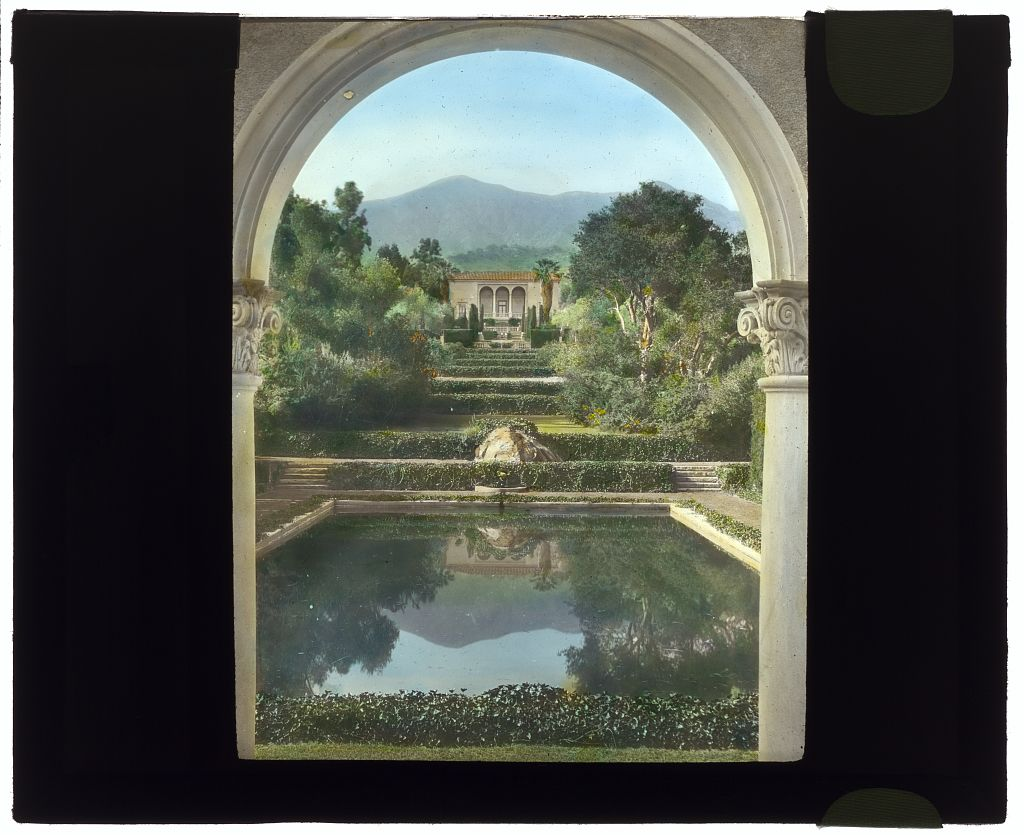
"Las Tejas," Oakleigh Thorne House, Montecito, California. View from swimming pool pavilion to house.

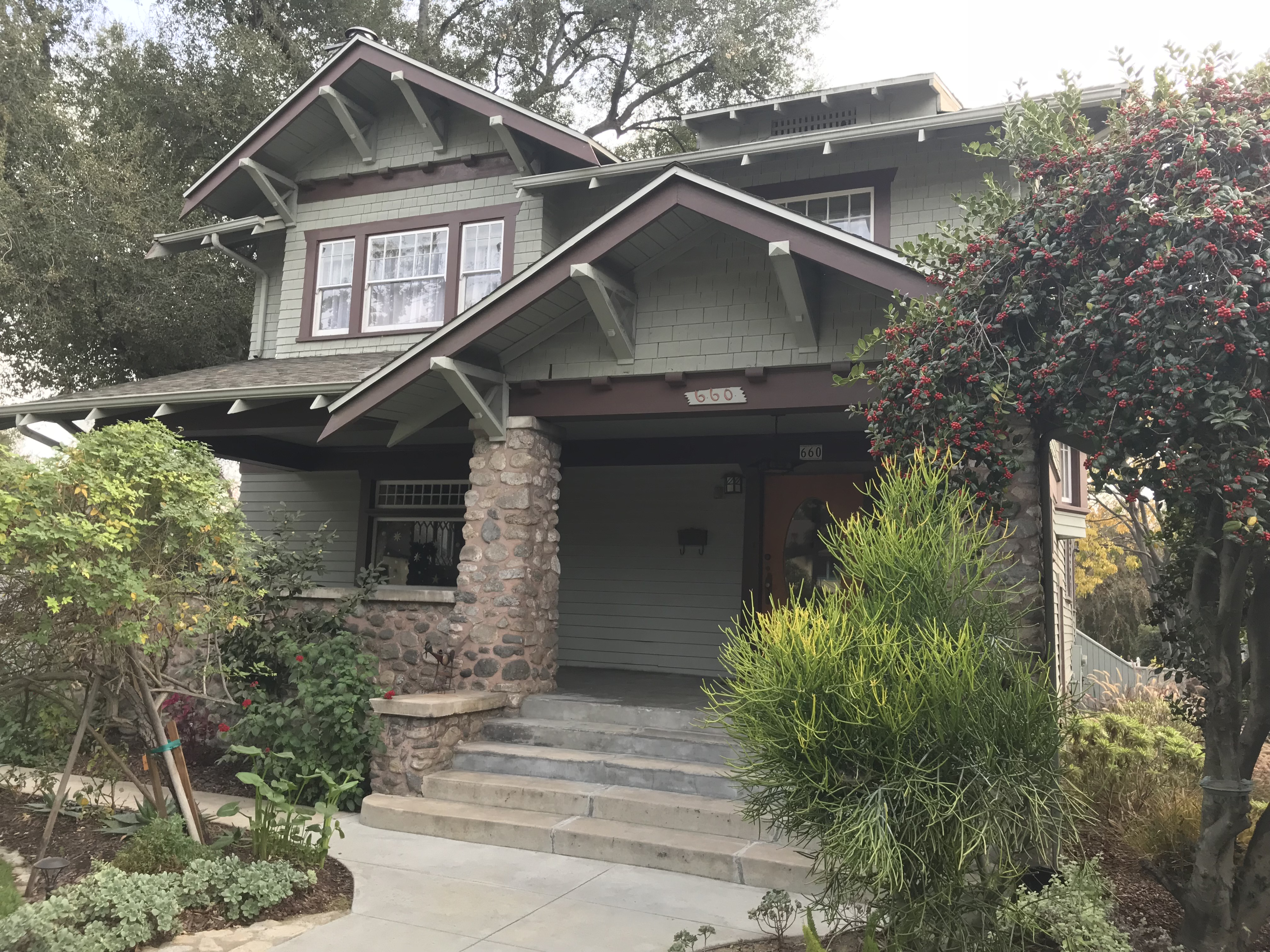
Home of Seth Cook Rees, Pasadena, 1908; Francis W. Wilson. Prime example of Arts and Crafts period residential architecture, this property has been designated as an historic landmark by the City of Pasadena.
