= Wesleyan Methodist Church (United States) =

Methodist denomination in the United States

- Classification: Methodism
- Orientation: Holiness movement
- Polity: Connexionalism
- Origin: 1841; Utica
- Separated from: Methodist Episcopal Church (1841)
- Merger of: Hephzibah Faith Missionary Society (1948); Missionary Bands of the World (1958); Alliance of Reformed Baptist Churches of Canada (1966)
- Separations: Church of Daniel's Band (1893); Fire-Baptized Holiness Church (1896); Missionary Methodist Church (1913); Bible Methodist Connection of Churches (1967); Bible Methodist Connection of Tennessee (1968); Allegheny Wesleyan Methodist Connection (1968)
- Merged into: Wesleyan Church (1968)

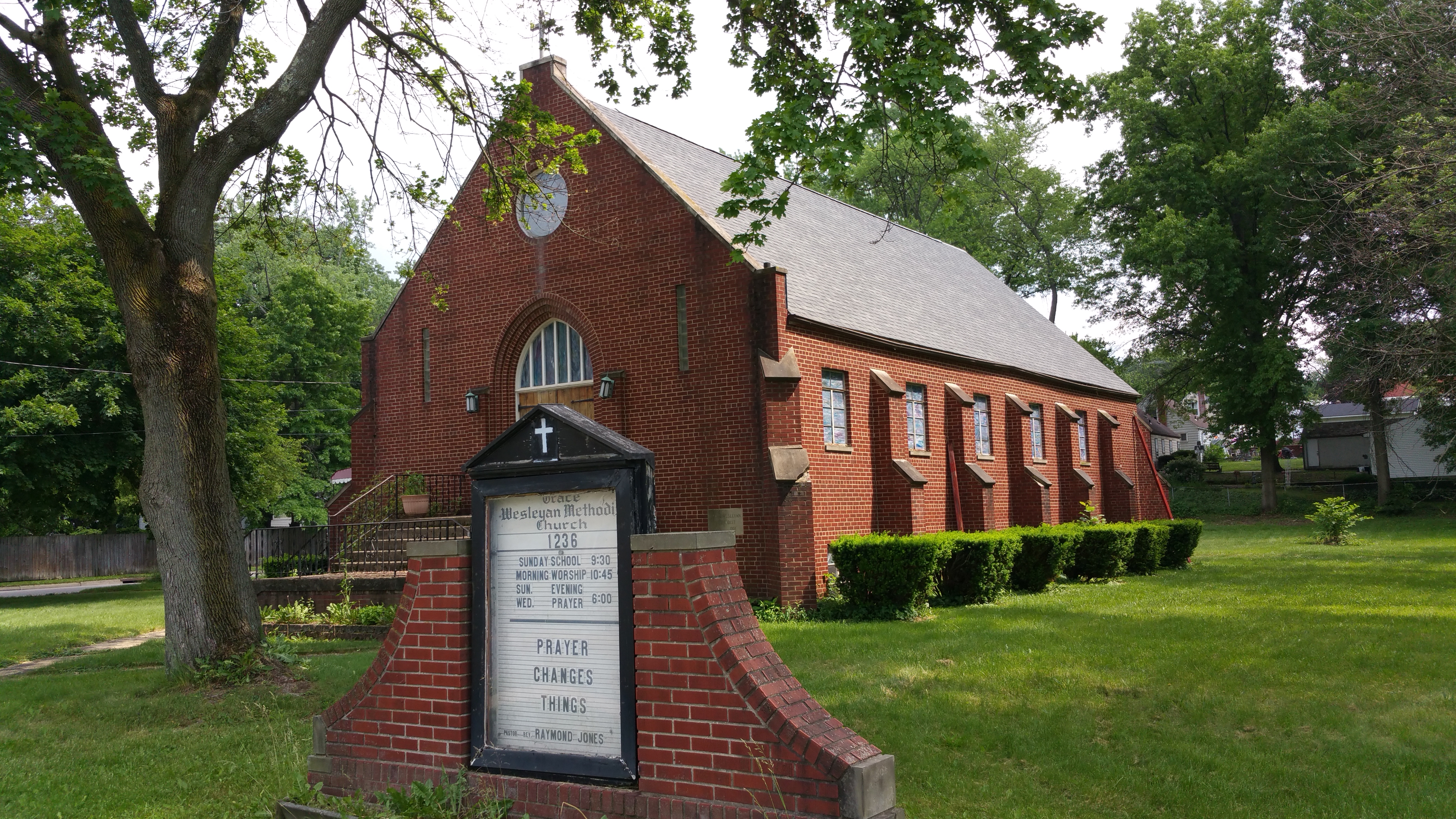
Grace Wesleyan Methodist Church in Akron, Ohio was a part of the Allegheny Conference of the Wesleyan Methodist Church, which eventually separated from the denomination and became the Allegheny Wesleyan Methodist Connection.

The Wesleyan Methodist Church was a Methodist denomination in the United States organized on May 13, 1841.

It was composed of ministers and laypeople who withdrew from the Methodist Episcopal Church because of disagreements regarding slavery and church polity, according to the Discipline of the Wesleyan Methodist Connection. The first secessions in 1841 took place in Michigan although the new church group was formalized in Utica, New York. In November 1842, Orange Scott, La Roy Sunderland and Jotham Horton seceded from the Methodist Episcopal Church for reasons given in their publication of the True Wesleyan (which was later renamed as the Wesleyan Methodist). The founders of the Wesleyan Methodist Connection endorsed abolitionism and cited tolerance of the Methodist Episcopal Church of "so horrible a crime" as slavery as a key reason for their secession. The first General Conference was held in Utica, NY, in October 1844. This was presided over by Orange Scott. It emphasized the creation of a Book of Discipline that would "preserve and promote experimental and practical godliness." To this end, the Methodist doctrines of the New Birth and entire sanctification (holiness) have been emphasized by the denomination.

The Utica Convention authorized the publication of A Collection of Hymns for the use of the Wesleyan Methodist Connection (1843). A revision was made two years later under the direction of Rev. Cyrus Prindle.

The Wesleyan Methodist Connection desired an educated presbyterate and championed the establishment of a seminary in each Annual Conference. Advocating First-day Sabbatarian principles, the Wesleyan Methodist Church resolved to give honor to the Lord's Day through encouraging the attendance of Sunday School, services of worship, and abstaining from servile labour. It taught the equality of races and held that there was no reason why a black minister could not be appointed to a predominantly white congregation. The denomination supported the temperance movement; it took a stand against membership in secret societies as being "inconsistent with our duties to God and Christianity". The Wesleyan Methodist Church fell into the category of Holiness Methodist Pacifists, as it opposed war as documented in its Book of Discipline, which stated that the Gospel is in "every way opposed to the practice of War in all its forms; and those customs which tend to foster and perpetuate war spirit, [are] inconsistent with the benevolent designs of the Christian religion." It sent forth missionaries to various parts of the world to establish churches.

The Wesleyan Methodist Church merged with the Pilgrim Holiness Church in 1968, and became known as The Wesleyan Church. This was largely driven by the trend toward denominational mergers during the 1960s and the belief their similarities were greater than their differences. As such, they believed they could be more effective becoming one group. Several conferences in both merging denominations refused to be a part of the merged church over differences about modesty and worldliness (some of the conferences did not permit their members to have television sets, and required the women to have uncut hair in keeping with their interpretation of 1 Corinthians 11:15). One of the largest conferences which refused to join the merger was the Allegheny Conference with over 100 churches. It became the Allegheny Wesleyan Methodist Connection of Churches, and most of the churches are still known as Wesleyan Methodist, e.g. Salem Wesleyan Methodist Church. Other Wesleyan Methodists who dissented with the merger organized into the Bible Methodist Connection of Churches and the Bible Methodist Connection of Tennessee.

At the time of the merger, the Wesleyan Methodist Church had several colleges, including Houghton College, Marion College, Miltonvale College, the Brainerd Indian Training School, and the Wesleyan Seminary Foundation that was affiliated with Asbury Theological Seminary.

== See also ==
- List of Methodist denominations
- Primitive Methodist Church
- Wesleyan Methodist Church (Seneca Falls, New York)
