= Washington Court =

- U.S. National Register of Historic Places
- U.S. Historic district
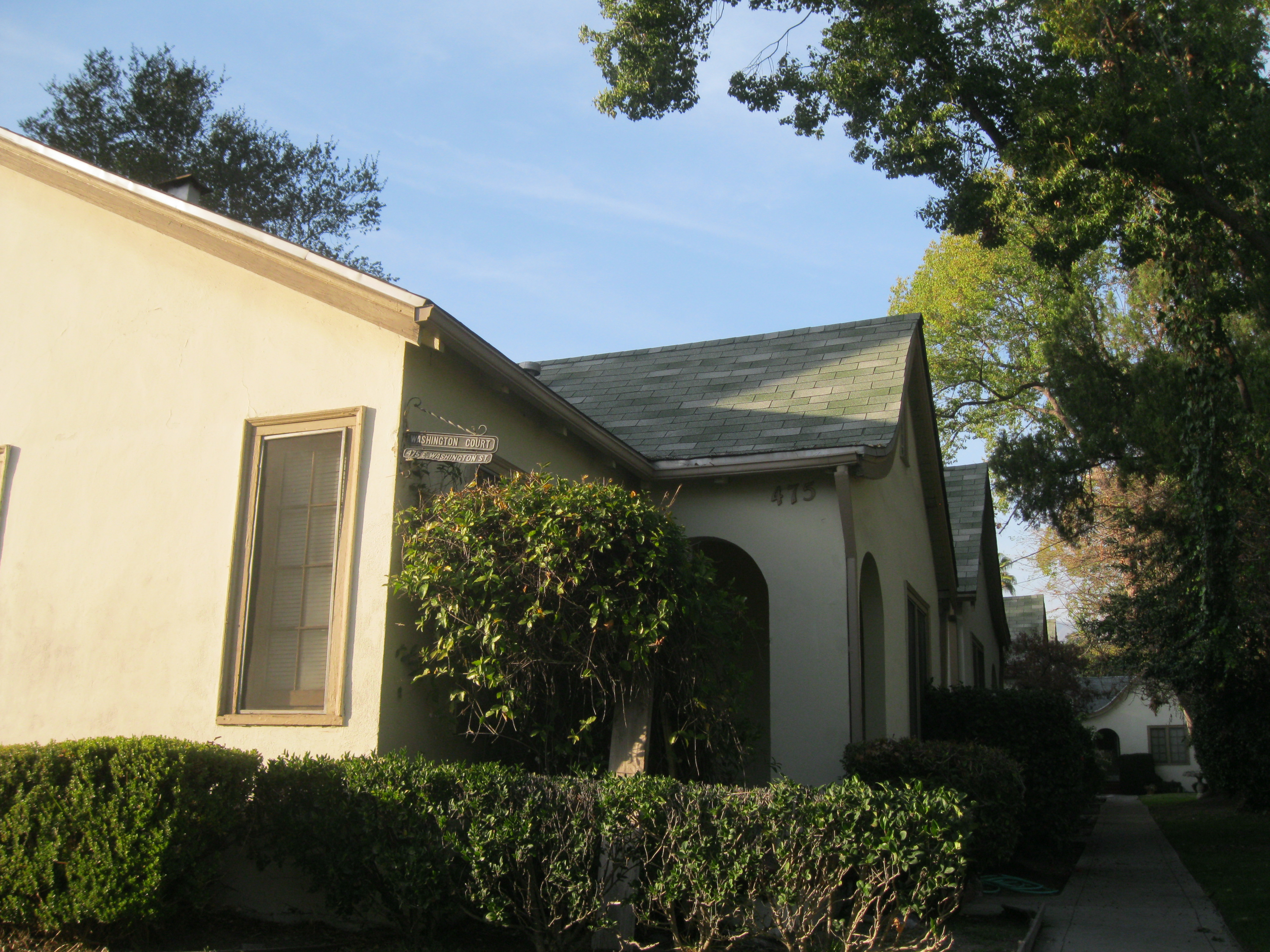

- Location within the Los Angeles metropolitan area Location within California Location within the United States
- Location: 475 E. Washington Blvd., Pasadena, California
- Coordinates: 34°10′9″N 118°8′27″W
- Area: less than one acre
- Built: 1924
- Architectural style: English Cottage Revival
- MPS: Bungalow Courts of Pasadena TR
- NRHP reference No.: 94001316
- Added to NRHP: November 15, 1994

Washington Court is a bungalow court located at 475 E. Washington Blvd. in Pasadena, California. The court consists of six single-family homes arranged in an "L" shape; a common walkway and garden runs along the east side of the court, while a driveway on the west side accesses a rear garage. The homes are designed in the English Cottage Revival style and feature cross gabled roofs with wooden louvers at the gable ends, wooden trim and window moldings, and arched entrances with flared eaves. F. R. Finch commissioned the court in 1924; the homes cost $2,250 each to build.

The court was added to the National Register of Historic Places on November 15, 1994.
