= Orange Scott =

American Methodist clergyman (1800–1847)

The Reverend Orange Scott
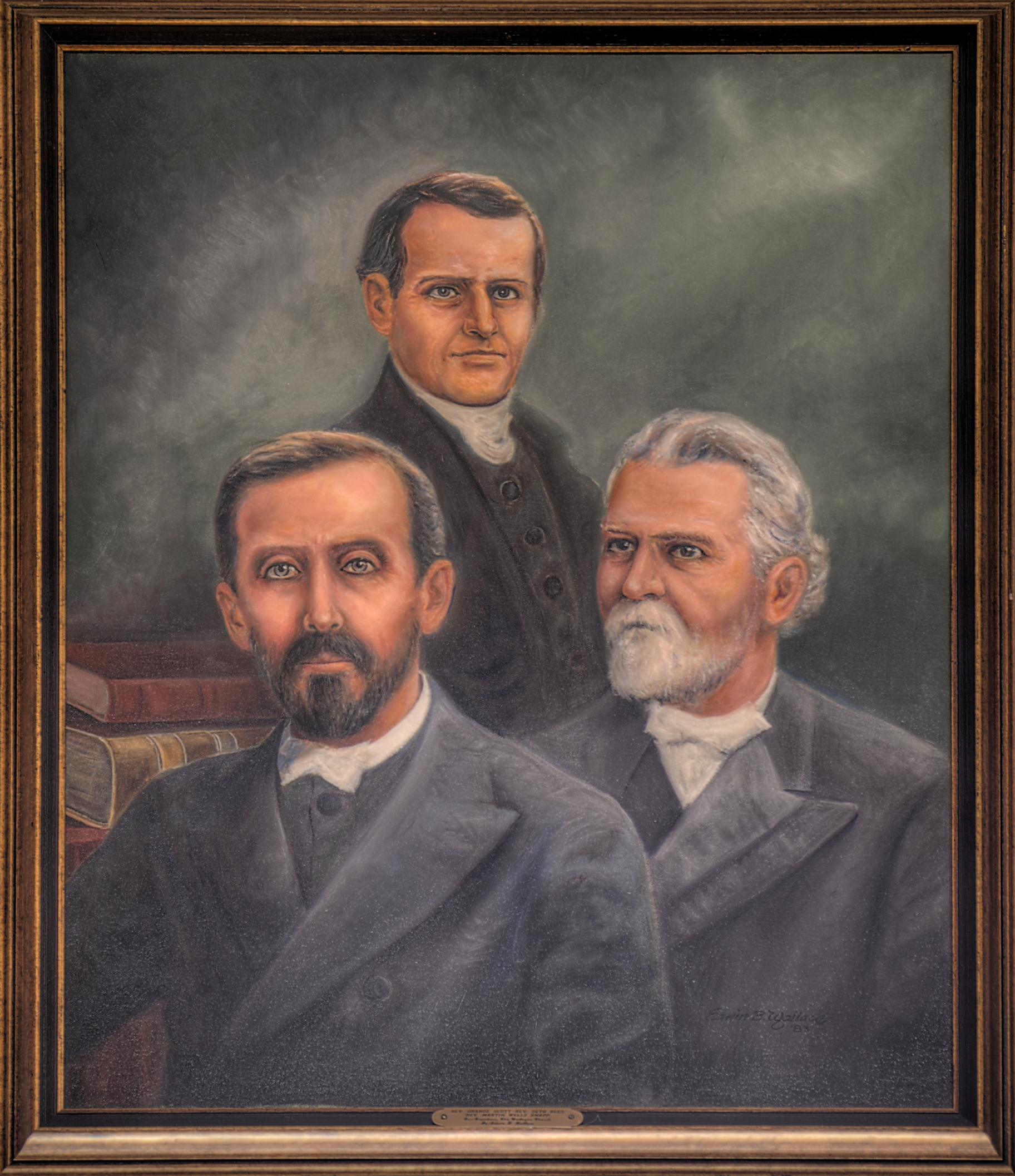
- Painting of Martin Wells Knapp, Scott (middle), and Seth Cook Rees on display at the World Methodist Museum, Lake Junaluska, NC
- Born: 13 February 1800
- Died: 31 July 1847 (aged 47)
- Occupations: Cleric; theologian

Ecclesiastical career
- Religion: Christian (Methodist)
- Church: Methodist Episcopal Church; Wesleyan Methodist Church
- Offices held: Presiding Elder

Orange Scott (February 13, 1800 – July 31, 1847) was an American Methodist Episcopal minister, Presiding Elder, and District President. He presided over the convention that organized the Wesleyan Methodist Connexion in 1843, having separated from the Methodist Episcopal Church. He was born in Brookfield, Vermont, the eldest of eight children. The family was poor and Orange was working full-time when he was twelve.

"Orange Scott became convinced that the holy hearts should result in holy lives and that holy men should seek to bring an end to social evils such as slavery and intemperance." As an abolitionist, Orange Scott stated that "If slavery be a moral evil, the conclusion is irresistible that it ought to be immediately abandoned."

== Early life ==
Orange Scott experienced convicting grace while working in a field and experienced the New Birth at a camp meeting at the age of twenty. This brought him into the fold of Methodism.

== Ministry ==
Following his personal conversion to Christ at the age of 20, Orange Scott began serving as a circuit rider for the Methodist Episcopal Church. In 1834, he published an abolitionist treatise, arguing that the institution of slavery was a moral evil and should be wholly rejected by the Church.

Despite public opinion, Rev. Scott insisted: "...though public opinion commanded Mr. Wesley to desist through the medium of mobs, still he stood it out! Shame on his compromising sons! The Methodists in all parts of the United States have braved, and, finally, to a considerable extent, changed public opinion. Every man's hand has been against us, and yet we have stood firm.
But now comes up the new doctrine of compromise! Let it be banished from the breast of every patriot, philanthropist, and Christian.
The advocates of temperance have braved and changed public opinion.
The same may be said of Wilberforce, and the English abolitionists.
And with all these examples before us, shall we succumb to an unholy public opinion, founded in the love of gain! Shall we turn our backs upon the cause of suffering humanity, because public opinion frowns upon us? No! Never!!"

Rev. Scott: "I assumed the position that the principle of slavery—-the principle which justifies holding and treating the human species as property, is morally wrong—-or, in other words, that it is a sin. The principle, I contended, aside from all circumstances, is evil, ONLY EVIL, and that CONTINUALLY! I said, no hand could sanctify it—-no circumstances could change it from bad to good. It was a reprobate—-too bad to be converted—-not subject to the law of God, neither indeed could be. I admitted that circumstances might palliate, and circumstances might aggravate, but no circumstances could justify the principle." "He who has made of one blood, all nations of men to dwell on the earth' [Acts 17:26] must look with disapprobation upon such a system of complicated wrongs, as American slavery... abolition is from above (of which I have no more doubt than of the truth of Christianity)..."

Along with three others, Orange Scott published in 1843 in the True Wesleyan (a periodical founded by him and Jotham Horton), an announcement to hold A Wesleyan Anti-Slavery Convention at the Methodist church in Andover, Massachusetts with the purpose of planning the formation of a separate denomination "free from Episcopacy and Slavery". Orange Scott was elected to preside over the Utica Convention, which would organize the Wesleyan Methodist Church. Rev. Scott called it "a new anti-slavery, anti-intemperance, anti-every-thing wrong, church organization".
