= Taiwan Holiness Church =

The Taiwan Holiness Church (Chinese: 台灣聖教會) was established in 1926 when some Taiwanese youths who had converted to the Japan Holiness Church whilst studying in Japan, returned home to Taiwan and began evangelizing in the country along with fellow Japanese pastors.

== Historical background ==
American Holiness missionaries, belonging to the Oriental Mission Society had arrived in Tokyo, Japan since 1901 and established the Central Gospel Evangelical Office. There, they began to itinerate and preach their beliefs among the Japanese populace. The Holiness movement they represented was born in the United States after the American Civil War during a period of religious renewal in the years and was seen by many as a revitalization of the Methodist Church. A product of the Methodist and Episcopalian traditions, the Holiness Protestants accepted John Wesley's schema of justification and sanctification but wanted church leaders to be more willing to allow the Holy Spirit to move within them. Out of this desire for a more intense religiosity was born a new church movement that grew and prospered in America in the last four decades of the 19th century. Seminaries and churches had been established by 1900 and Holiness missionaries were travelling to all parts of the world. They reached Japan in 1901. In 1905, after gaining enough converts, these missionaries were able to establish the Far Eastern Church. Over the next two decades, the missionaries and their Japanese converts began to consider Taiwan as a site for mission work. Although they visited the island in 1913 and again in 1917, on both occasions they felt that the time was not yet right to begin the evangelistic work. But in 1926, they were ready to move ahead.

The converts, accompanied by pastor Jūji Nakada, settled in Taipei in January and launched their campaign. Within a few days, a Holiness Church was organized in a building on the main north–south thoroughfare of the city, the Thek-sú Highway. It served as the home of the new congregation. Pastor Nakada then moved on to the bustling port in the island's southwest, Takao. Within a few months, a core of believers had emerged to found a church on the city's Gaishang Street. Nakada continued to itinerate and attract an audience. November saw him on the island's east coast of Hualien, a port city. Once again, those who heard him proved receptive, and still another church was founded. Thus in less than a year, Holiness evangelists had planted three churches in Taiwan. Pastor Nakada returned to Tokyo at the end of 1926 but came back to Formosa in November 1927. Again he met with success. He planted a church that month in the southeastern corner of the island in Taitung. December 1927 found him in the Japanese-developed port of Keelung, just northeast of Taipei. There he delivered a powerful series of sermons heard by attentive and receptive audiences. Soon the city's Protestant converts joined forces and founded the Keelung Holiness Church.
