= Jerry Lorenzo =

American fashion and sneaker designer (born 1977)

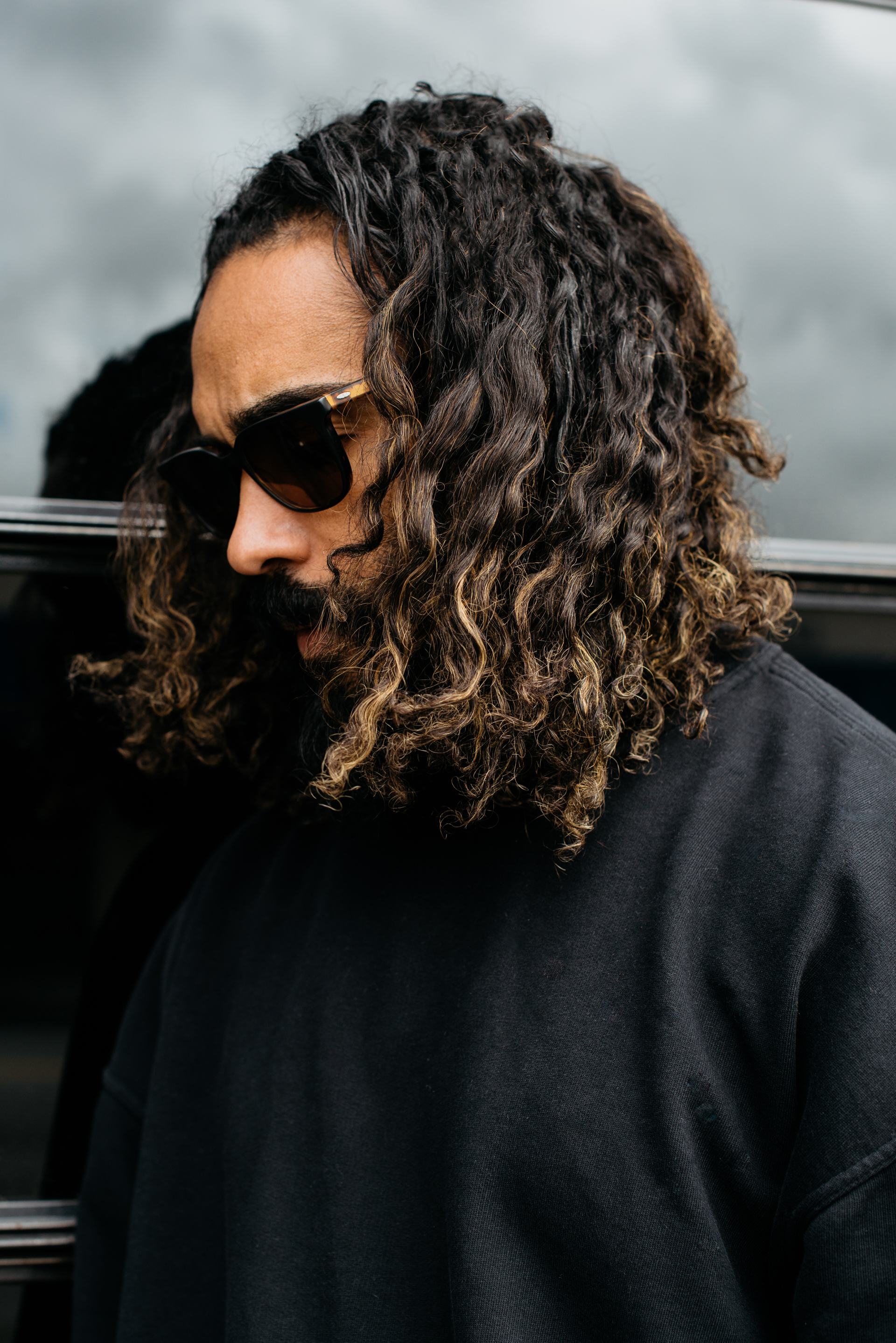
- Born: Jerry Lorenzo Manuel; October 5, 1977 (age 48); Sacramento, California, U.S.
- Education: Florida Agricultural and Mechanical University & Loyola University Chicago
- Occupation: Fashion designer
- Label: Fear of God
- Parent: Jerry Manuel (father) Renette Manuel (mother)
- Website: www.fearofgod.com

Jerry Lorenzo Manuel Jr. (born October 5, 1977), known professionally as Jerry Lorenzo, is an American fashion designer. He is the founder of the American streetwear label Fear of God.

== Early life and career ==
Lorenzo was born on October 5, 1977, in Sacramento, California. He spent much of his childhood travelling; his father — former MLB player, coach, and manager Jerry Manuel — frequently transitioned roles in MLB, from playing parts of five seasons as a second baseman for the Detroit Tigers, Montreal Expos, and San Diego Padres to managing teams such as the Chicago White Sox and New York Mets and coaching the Montreal Expos and Florida Marlins.

Lorenzo initially attended Florida A&M, where he obtained a bachelor's degree. Following this, he pursued an MBA at Loyola University Chicago, alongside working part-time for the sales department at Diesel. After college, he began his career working for the LA Dodgers managing corporate sponsorships, as well as for a sports marketing agency.

In 2008, Lorenzo returned to Los Angeles, where he began operating as a party promoter; his events attracted notable attention from figures such as Virgil Abloh, Pusha-T, and Kid Cudi. In the same year, he began managing MLB player Matt Kemp, focusing on areas such as his image and styling. Gradually, Lorenzo realized he wanted to style Kemp in ways that were less conventional, and as a result began designing apparel himself. Lorenzo stated he “felt like there was something missing in (his) closet, and if it was missing in (his) then it must be missing from yours, too.” This newfound inspiration prompted Lorenzo to change career paths, and he founded Fear of God with a budget of $14,000.

Lorenzo founded Fear of God in 2011, despite his lack of fashion training and relative unfamiliarity in the world of streetwear. In 2016, Lorenzo designed and created five custom looks for Justin Bieber to wear on stage during his Purpose World Tour, and also helped in the design process for the tour's merchandise.

In 2018, Lorenzo launched Essentials as a subsidiary to Fear of God, described by Vogue as a "competitively priced sister label."

== Influences ==
Lorenzo draws heavy influence from a wide range of sources, most notably amongst his contemporaries Kanye West, other artists such as Kurt Cobain, and athletes such as Allen Iverson. Lorenzo employed elements of his inspiration from Cobain whilst working with Justin Bieber to design merchandise for his Purpose Tour; the aesthetics match Cobain's style closely, such as graphic t-shirts, flannel overshirts and denim.

He also regards fashion designer Rick Owens as an influence in his work. Recalling his purchase of a pair of Rick Owens ‘Dunks’ in 2006, Lorenzo recalled how the designer was able to transform a basketball sneaker into a luxury item, integrating two very different worlds into one entity. The process of expressing the aesthetics of minimalism and comfort in a luxury medium forms the foundations of both Fear of God, and its sister brand Essentials.

Lorenzo has a strong knowledge regarding baseball, and its history, which he has implemented in his works. As an example, his seventh collection paid homage to the Negro Leagues with pieces that resembled the roles his father held when he managed MLB teams.

Lorenzo has also stated that his Christian faith inspired the name of his brand, Fear of God. When Lorenzo was younger, reading Christian devotionals became a habit throughout the household, My Utmost for His Highest by Oswald Chambers was a consistent reading for him and his family.

== Brand and collaborations ==
Fear of God first began gaining traction when rapper Big Sean’s stylist discovered the brand’s ‘extra-long’ T-shirts. A few weeks later, Lorenzo received a call from Kanye West, who had seen the same T-shirts and was interested in learning more about the brand. Lorenzo travelled to Atlantic City to meet West, where they formed a connection which allowed Lorenzo to pursue further prospects, such as working with West on his collaboration with A.P.C.

In 2017, the brand launched a joint collaboration with Vans, transforming their Era 95 shoe with a signature all-over print, and worked with Nike in 2018 to produce the signature Air Fear of God 1 silhouette. Lorenzo moved away from both brands, assuming the position of Global Head of Adidas Basketball in 2020.
