= God's Bible School and College =

Bible college in Cincinnati, Ohio, U.S.

Coordinates: 39°6′56″N 84°30′22″W

- Type: Private Bible college
- Established: 1900
- Affiliations: SOCHE
- Religious affiliation: Christian
- President: Rodney S. Loper
- Students: 450
- Location: Cincinnati, Ohio, US
- Website: www.gbs.edu

God's Bible School and College is a private Bible college in Cincinnati, Ohio. It was founded in 1900 and is of the Wesleyan-Arminian (Methodist) tradition.

== History ==
Originally known as God's Bible School, the college was founded by Methodist minister Martin Wells Knapp in 1900. It began as a diploma course, devoted almost exclusively to the study of the Bible and practical subjects. The goal of the institution was to enable the students to be effective workers in what Knapp called the "great, whitened harvest field." The original curriculum was called the Christian Worker's Course and in 1936 was standardized into a regular four-year collegiate course. At that same time, the Department of Education of the State of Ohio granted authorization to the college to confer baccalaureate degrees.

== Academics ==
God's Bible School and College has three academic divisions (Education and Professional Studies, Ministerial Education, and Music) and offers both traditional and fully online education. Through these divisions eight areas of study are offered. The college offers degrees at the associate's, bachelor's, and graduate level, as well as a certificate in Christian Ministry. The college also offers over twenty degree pathways through partnerships with other colleges and universities.

=== Accreditation ===
God's Bible School and College is authorized by the Department of Education of the State of Ohio to award associate and baccalaureate degrees and is accredited by the Higher Learning Commission. It is also accredited by the Commission on Accreditation of the Association for Biblical Higher Education (ABHE). Its education degrees are accredited by the Council for the Accreditation of Educator Preparation (CAEP). The institution is a member of the Strategic Ohio Council for Higher Education (SOCHE).

== Facilities ==
God's Bible School and College has six major buildings. The Administration Building houses administrative offices, the Revivalist offices, faculty offices, and classrooms. The Deets-Miller Student Center houses a dining hall, student snack bar and recreation room, Presidential Dining Room, a full-size gymnasium, classrooms, and faculty offices. The Knapp Memorial Building houses a chapel, a men's residence hall, and classrooms. The McNeill Music Hall houses faculty offices, classrooms, and practice rooms. The Revivalist Memorial Building houses a women's residence hall and the Aldersgate Christian Academy. The R.G. Flexon Memorial Library provides shelf space for 60,000 volumes, student study area, offices, and archives.

== Ministries ==
The college operates a K-12 Christian school (Aldersgate Christian Academy) and publishes the God's Revivalist.

The students and staff of God's Bible School & College operate several inner-city ministries in downtown Cincinnati. They include Main Street Chapel, the Hospital Singers, Laurel Homes Kid's Club, Teen Power, and Prayer Station. They also participate in local church and jail ministries.

== Notable alumni and faculty ==
- Oswald Chambers, author of My Utmost for His Highest, taught at God's Bible School & College
- Emerson Stephen Colaw, United Methodist Bishop, attended God's Bible School & College
- Charles Cowman, Christian missionary and missions organization cofounder, attended God's Bible School & College
- Lettie Burd Cowman, Christian missionary and missions organization cofounder, attended God's Bible School & College
- Pilipo Miriye, first evangelical missionary from Papua New Guinea to Nigeria, attended God's Bible School & College
- Lillian Trasher, missionary, attended God's Bible School & College
- Phil and Kim Collingsworth of the Collingsworth Family, both attended God's Bible School & College
