= Cowman (surname) =

Cowman is an occupational surname of Norman origin. from cowman. A rare surname throughout the world today, Cowman is most common in Ireland.

As an Irish surname, it is anglicised from Irish Gaelic surname Ó Comáin.

Notable persons with that surname include:

- Alan Cowman (born 1954), Australian malaria researcher
- Charles Cowman (1868–1924), American missionary to Japan
- Dick Cowman (born 1949), rugby player
- Joseph Cowman (fl. 1705–1748), one of the founders of the Patuxent Iron Works
- Lettie Cowman (1870–1960), American author
- Roz Cowman (born 1942), is an Irish poet and critic
- Stan Cowman (1923–2003), New Zealand cricket umpire

== See also ==
- Cowman (disambiguation)
