= Mount Dyson =

Mountain in Alberta, Canada

Coordinates: 50.594°N 114.545°W

Mount Dyson is a summit in Alberta, Canada.

Mount Dyson was named for a cattleman.
