= Los Angeles Holiness Church =

Church in Los Angeles, California, United States

Coordinates: 34.021520°N 118.313586°W

Los Angeles Holiness Church was founded in 1921 in Los Angeles, California. The roots and theology of the church go back to John Wesley, founder of Methodism. Los Angeles Holiness Church is a multi-generational church with English and Japanese congregations and partnering with a Spanish-speaking congregation. Los Angeles Holiness Church is the mother church and headquarters of the OMS Holiness Church of North America which has churches throughout California, Hawaii, and Arizona. It is the only denomination that was founded by and focused towards Japanese and Japanese Americans. Currently, English congregations in the OMS Holiness Church of North America have grown with Asian Americans and other ethnicities as part of its membership.

== History ==
Los Angeles Holiness Church was founded by six Japanese men and women in their early 20s (Henry Sakuma, Hatsu Yano, George Yahiro, Paul Okamoto, Aya Okuda, and Hanako Sugiyama). All them were Issei, born and raised in Japan, while George Yahiro was the only Nisei, second generation born in the U.S., in the group. The young people prayed for the salvation of the Japanese people which gave birth to a vision to start their own church. While there were eleven Japanese Christian churches in downtown Los Angeles at that time, none of them satisfied their spiritual needs as the group desired a church that had a burning heart to pray for the salvation of unsaved people. Thus, the young men and women founded Los Angeles Holiness Church in April 1921 in a small house. In 1951 Los Angeles Holiness Church decided to purchase a chapel for their services after a poor widow, Hide Okada, borrowed five hundred dollars from the credit union and gave it toward the building fund. Hide Okada’s generosity encouraged other board members and church members to give as well. The mortgage was paid in three years and Los Angeles Holiness Church continues to use that sanctuary for their worship services today. In the 1966 Los Angeles Holiness Church constructed the education building next to the chapel.

Other key people who were influential to the founding of Los Angeles Holiness church include: Juji Nakada, Ernest A. Kilbourne, Sadaichi Kuzuhara.

The Holiness Church of North America is also affiliated with the Japan Holiness Church, OMS International (formerly Oriental Missionary Society; now One Mission Society), and other sister Holiness Conferences such as the Evangelical Holiness Church of Brazil, Taiwan Holiness Church, and Korea Evangelical Holiness Church.

== Pastors ==
Japanese-speaking pastors
Sadaichi Kuzuhara 1921–42
George Yahiro 1923–29
Eiji Suehiro 1933–34
Chiaki Kuzuhara 1939–42
World War II 1941–45 The church was closed during these years because of the Japanese American internment.
George Yahiro 1945–46
Eiji Suehiro 1946–75
Robert Tsujimoto 1975–79
Shunji Mizoguchi 1975–78
Takemasa Hosomi 1979–87
Shunji Mizoguchi 1987–2020
Makito Takagi 2021–Present

English-speaking pastors
George Yahiro 1945–46
Eiji Suehiro 1946–47
Akira Kuroda 1947–57
Arthur Tsuneishi 1957–59
Akira Kuroda 1959–78
George Toda 1959–62
Arthur Tsuneishi 1978–89
Jerry Higashi 1983–84
David Shinoda 1985–87
Wayne Ibara 1989–1996
Lester Yamashita 1990–1994
Richard Chuman 1996–2009
Seigo Takayoshi 2002–2018
Michael Furuyama 2019–2025
