= Expo/Western station =

Los Angeles Metro Rail station

Expo/Western
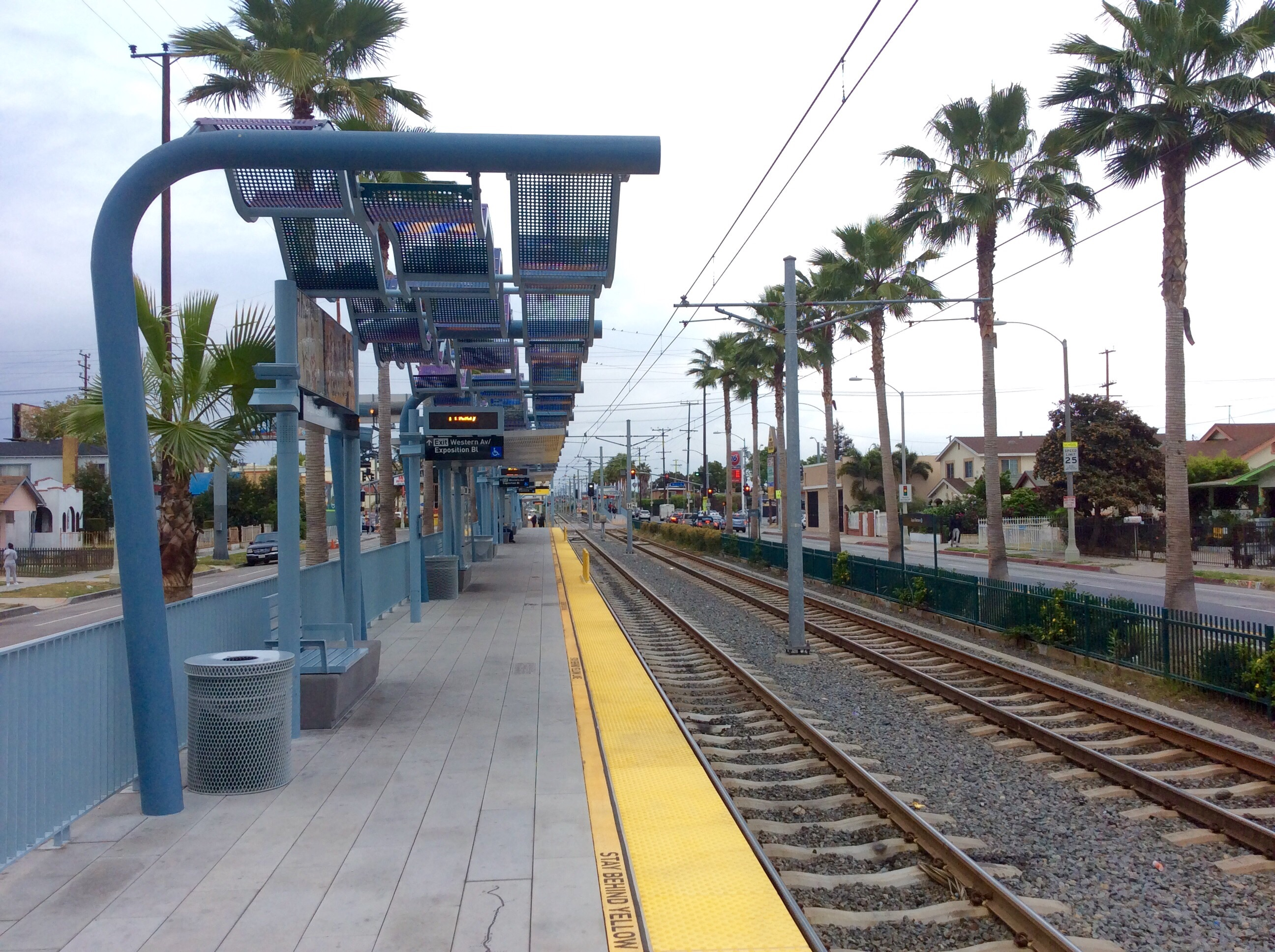
- Expo/Western station platform, 2015

General information
- Location: 1573 West Exposition Boulevard; Los Angeles, California
- Coordinates: 34.0182°N 118.3089°W
- Owner: Los Angeles County Metropolitan Transportation Authority
- Platforms: 2 farside side platforms
- Tracks: 2
- Connections: Los Angeles Metro Bus

Construction
- Structure type: At-grade
- Cycle facilities: Racks
- Accessible: Yes

History
- Opened: October 17, 1875
- Rebuilt: April 28, 2012
- Former names: Western

Passengers
- FY 2026: 2,777 (avg. wkdy boardings)

Services
Preceding station	Metro Rail	Following station
Expo/Crenshaw toward Santa Monica	E Line	Expo/Vermont toward East LA
Former services
Preceding station	Pacific Electric	Following station
11th Ave toward Rustic Canyon	Air Line	Vermont toward Pacific Electric Building
Location

Expo/Western station is an at-grade light rail station on the E Line of the Los Angeles Metro Rail system. The station is located in the center median of Exposition Boulevard at its intersection with Western Avenue, after which the station is named, in the West Adams neighborhood of Los Angeles.

== History ==
Originally a stop on the Los Angeles and Independence and Pacific Electric railroads, it closed on September 30, 1953, with the closure of the Santa Monica Air Line and remained out of service until re-opening on Saturday, April 28, 2012. It was completely rebuilt for the opening of the Expo Line from little more than a station stop marker. Regular scheduled service resumed Monday, April 30, 2012.

== Service ==
=== Station layout ===
The station has "far-side" platforms: this means that the platforms are positioned on opposite sides of the intersection, and trains always stop at the platform after crossing the intersection.

=== Hours and frequency ===
E Line service hours are from approximately 4:30 a.m. and 11:45 p.m daily. Trains operate every 8 minutes during peak hours, Monday to Friday. Trains run every 10 minutes, during midday on weekdays and weekends, from 9:00 a.m. to 7:00 p.m. Night and early morning service is approximately every 20 minutes every day.

=== Connections ===
As of December 15, 2024, the following connections are available:

- Los Angeles Metro Bus: 102, 207

== Notable places nearby ==
The station is within walking distance of the following notable places:

- James A. Foshay Learning Center
- Los Angeles Holiness Church

== Station artwork ==
The station's art was created by artist Ronald J. Llanos. Entitled Ephemeral Views: A Visual Essay, the installation depicts scenes of "the many characters who activate Los Angeles street life."
