= My Utmost for His Highest (album) =

Compilation album by Various artists
- Released: August 8, 1995; April 23, 1996 (The Covenant); July 16, 1996 (Quite Prayers)
- Genre: CCM
- Length: 51:13; 48:47 (The Covenant); 38:39 (Quiet Prayers)
- Label: Word
- Producer: Brown Bannister; John Elefante; Dino Elefante; Shane Keister; Tommy Sims; Dan Posthuma

Professional ratings
Review scores
Source	Rating
CCM Magazine	(not rated)

My Utmost for His Highest is the first of three albums of songs inspired by Oswald Chambers' devotional of the same name. The album, produced by Brown Bannister, features performances by popular Christian musicians of songs relating to a day from Chamber's book. It was the first album to receive the GMA Dove Award for Special Event Album of the Year, and was nominated for a Grammy Award for Best Pop/Contemporary Gospel Album.

The two additional albums produced in the series were My Utmost for His Highest: The Covenant and My Utmost for His Highest: Quiet Prayers.

== My Utmost for His Highest ==
=== Track listing ===
1. "You Are Holy" (Carolyn Arends, Mark Harris, Michael W. Smith) – 4:56; performed by 4Him
2. "Lover of My Soul" (Amy Grant, Michael Omartian) – 5:14; performed by Amy Grant
3. "A Man After Your Own Heart" (Wayne Kirkpatrick, Billy Sprague) – 4:31; performed by Gary Chapman
4. "You'll Be There" (Cindy Morgan) – 3:21; performed by Cindy Morgan
5. "Sometimes He Comes In The Clouds" (Steven Curtis Chapman) – 4:01; performed by Steven Curtis Chapman
6. "God of All of Me" (Bob Farrell, MWS) – 4:45; performed by Sandi Patty
7. "Move In Me" (Wayne Kirkpatrick, MWS) – 6:10; performed by Michael W. Smith
8. "Hold On to Me" (Robert Sterling, MWS) – 4:00; performed by Point of Grace
9. "A Heart Like Mine" (Loren Balman, Robbie Buchanan, Bryan Duncan, Bob Farrell, Greg Nelson)- 4:23; performed by Bryan Duncan
10. "Where He Leads Me" (Twila Paris) – 5:33; performed by Twila Paris
11. "Shine On Us" (MWS, Debbie Smith) – 4:00; performed by Phillips, Craig and Dean

=== Personnel ===
- Shane Keister – keyboards (1, 4, 7, 8), acoustic piano (10)
- Blair Masters – additional keyboards (1, 3), keyboards (7)
- Tommy Sims – programming (2, 5), backing vocals (4), bass (5), additional programming (6), keyboards (10)
- Michael Omartian – acoustic piano (3)
- Carl Marsh – keyboards (5, 8, 10)
- Danny Duncan – additional programming (5, 6)
- Robbie Buchanan – programming (6, 9)
- Michael W. Smith – acoustic piano (7)
- Brian Siewert – programming (11)
- Dann Huff – guitar (1, 2, 4, 6–9)
- Don Potter – acoustic guitar (1, 4, 7, 8, 10)
- Steven Curtis Chapman – acoustic guitar (5)
- Gordon Kennedy – acoustic guitar (5), electric guitar (5), guitar (9)
- Leland Sklar – bass (1, 4, 7, 8, 9)
- Steve Brewster – drums (1, 4, 7, 8)
- Paul Leim – drums (9)
- Ronn Huff – string arrangements (1–4, 6, 7, 11)
- Tom Howard – string arrangements (9)
- Gavyn Wright – concertmaster (1–4, 6, 7, 9, 11)
- The London Session Orchestra – strings (1–4, 6, 7, 9, 11)
- Cheryl Rogers – vocal arrangement (8)
- Lisa Keith – backing vocals (2, 9)
- Michael Mellett – backing vocals (2, 3, 5, 10)
- Nicol Sponberg – backing vocals (2, 9)
- Molly Felder – backing vocals (4)
- Cindy Morgan – backing vocals (4)
- Wayne Kirkpatrick – backing vocals (7)

=== Production ===
- Loren Balman – executive producer, art direction
- Brown Bannister – producer, additional engineer
- Tommy Sims – BGV production (2, 9)
- Paul Mills – vocal production (11)
- Jeff Balding – engineer
- Steve Bishir – engineer, mixing (5, 11)
- Bill Price – string recording
- Bill Deaton – mixing (1–4, 6–10)
- Patrick Kelly – additional engineer, mix assistant
- Martin Woodlee – additional engineer, assistant engineer
- Joey Grimstead – assistant engineer
- Carry Summers – assistant engineer, mix assistant
- Aaron Swihart – assistant engineer, mix assistant
- Niall Acott – string recording assistant
- Daron Smith – mix assistant
- Stephen Marcussen – mastering
- Traci Sterling – production coordination
- Diana Barnes – art direction, design
- Franke Design – design
- Matthew Barnes – photography
- James Reimann – liner notes

Studios

- Recorded at The Dugout and OmniSound Studios (Nashville, Tennessee); Tejas Recorders and Deer Valley Studio (Franklin, Tennessee); Vintage Recorders (Phoenix, Arizona).
- Strings recorded at Angel Studios (London, UK).
- Mixed at OmniSound Studios and Quad Studios (Nashville, Tennessee); Gambit Studio (Gallatin, Tennessee).
- Mastered at Precision Mastering (Hollywood, California).

== My Utmost for His Highest: The Covenant ==
=== Track listing ===
1. "All of Me" (Cindy Morgan, Michael W. Smith) – 4:32; performed by BeBe Winans
2. "Reprise (All of Me)"- 5:02; performed by The London Session Orchestra
3. "The Covenant" (David Mullen, Tommy Sims) – 5:00; performed by Anointed
4. "Someday (Set the Children Free)" (David Mullen, MWS) – 5:35; performed by Michael W. Smith
5. "Through All the Years" (David Mullen, Loren Balman, John Mandeville) – 4:09; performed by Greg Long and Joanna Carlson
6. "Psalm 121" (Tommy Greer) – 4:24; performed by Susan Ashton
7. "Make It a Promise" (Bob Farrell, Robbie Buchanan) – 4:23; performed by Clay Crosse
8. "I Will Follow You" (Dino Elefante, John Elefante) – 4:46; performed by John Elefante and Lisa Bevill
9. "Reprise (My Utmost For His Highest)" – 6:14; performed by The London Session Orchestra
10. "Joyful, Joyful We Adore Thee" – 4:37; performed by Michael W. Smith and Anointed

=== Personnel ===
- Shane Keister – keyboards (1, 3–5, 7), acoustic piano (3, 5, 6, 10), programming (4)
- Blair Masters – keyboards (6)
- John Elefante – keyboards (8)
- Michael Omartian – acoustic piano (8)
- Michael W. Smith – acoustic piano (10), programming (10), arrangements (10)
- Brian D. Siewert – additional keyboard programming
- Jerry McPherson – guitars (1), electric guitar (3–7, 10), mandolin (10)
- Don Potter – acoustic guitar (3, 5, 7, 10)
- Mark Casstevens – acoustic guitar (3)
- Dann Huff – electric guitar (5, 6)
- Daryl Scott – acoustic guitar (6)
- Phil Madeira – electric guitar (6), Hammond B3 organ (6, 10)
- Glenn Pearce – guitars (8)
- Gordon Kennedy – electric guitar (10)
- Byron House – bass (1)
- Tommy Sims – bass (3–7, 10)
- Jackie Street – bass (8)
- Steve Brewster – drums (1, 3–7, 10)
- Scott Williamson – drums (8)
- Eric Darken – percussion (1)
- Carl Marsh – string arrangements (1–6), orchestral arrangements (2, 9)
- Ronn Huff – string arrangements (7, 8)
- Gavyn Wright – concertmaster (1–9)
- The London Session Orchestra – strings (1–9)
- Cindy Morgan – backing vocals (1)
- Lisa Bevill – backing vocals (4–6)
- Jim Chaffee – backing vocals (4)
- Marabeth Jordan – backing vocals (4)
- Michael Mellett – backing vocals (4, 5, 7)
- Chris Rodriguez – backing vocals (4)
- Nicol Sponberg – backing vocals (4–6)
- Robert White Johnson – backing vocals (4, 5)
- The Kid Connection Choir – backing vocals (4)
- The Born Again Church Choir – choir (10)

=== Production ===
- Loren Balman – executive producer, art direction, photography
- Brown Bannister – executive producer, producer (2, 6, 9, 10)
- Tommy Sims – producer (1, 3, 6, 7, 10)
- Shane Keister – producer (4, 5), additional engineer
- Dino Elefante – producer (8), additional engineer
- John Elefante – producer (8)
- Steve Bishir – recording, mixing (1, 3, 6)
- Rupert Coulson – orchestra recording
- Bill Deaton – mixing (2, 4, 5, 7, 9, 10)
- Terry Christian – mixing (8)
- Hank Nirider – recording assistant, additional engineer
- Martin Woodlee – recording assistant, additional engineer
- John Angelini – assistant engineer, additional engineer
- Carl Meadows – assistant engineer, mix assistant (1, 3, 6)
- Aaron Swihart – assistant engineer
- John Thomas – assistant engineer
- Jasyn Wilder – assistant engineer
- Jeff Balding – additional engineer
- Bob Cadway – additional engineer
- Steven J. Calleja – additional engineer
- Bryan Lenox – additional engineer
- David Shackney – additional engineer
- Brian D. Siewert – additional engineer
- Carry Summers – mix assistant (2, 4, 5, 7, 9, 10)
- John Dickson – mix assistant (8)
- Doug Sax – mastering
- Traci Sterling Bishir – production manager
- Diana Barnes – art direction, original design
- Franke Design – original design
- Chuck Hargett – additional design
- Matthew Barnes – photography

Studios

- Recorded at The Dugout (Nashville, Tennessee).
- Overdubbed at OmniSound Studios, Battery Studios, Javelina Recording Studios, Sound Emporium Studios and The Coloring Book (Nashville, Tennessee); The Snack Bar (Brentwood, Tennessee); Sound Kitchen and Deer Valley Studios (Franklin, Tennessee); Cove City Sound Studios (Long Island, New York).
- Orchestra recorded at AIR Lyndhurst Hall (London, UK).
- Mixed at Sound Emporium and Sound Shop Recording Studios (Nashville, Tennessee); Gambit Studio (Gallatin, Tennessee).
- Mastered at The Mastering Lab (Hollywood, California).

== My Utmost for His Highest: Quiet Prayers ==
=== Track listing ===
Note: All songs performed by Bryan Duncan.

1. "Bryan's Hymn (When I Turn To You)" (Bryan Duncan, James Felix) – 5:16
2. "O Love That Will Not Let Me Go" – 5:48
3. "I Surrender All" – 2:16
4. "Beneath the Cross of Jesus" (instrumental) – 2:03
5. "Come, Holy Spirit" (Bill Gaither, Gloria Gaither) – 3:27
6. "Take My Life and Let It Be" – 1:57
7. "A Heart Like Mine" (instrumental) (Duncan, Loren Balman, Robbie Buchanan, Bob Farrell, Greg Nelson) – 3:15
8. "I Need Thee Every Hour" – 3:19
9. "El Shaddai" (Michael Card, John Thompson) / "You Are My Hiding Place (Instrumental)" (Michael Ledner) – 4:49
10. "As The Deer" (Martyn Nydstrom) – 1:43
11. "Bryan's Prayer (I Love You with My Life)" (Duncan) – 4:50

=== Personnel ===
- Bryan Duncan – vocals (1–3, 5, 6, 8, 10, 11)
- Robbie Buchanan – keyboards, arrangements (5)
- Tom Howard – acoustic piano, arrangements (1–4, 6–11)
- John Darnall – guitars
- Dean Parks – guitars
- Jimmy Johnson – bass
- Luis Conte – percussion
- Sam Levine – soprano saxophone
- Nashville String Machine – strings

=== Production ===
- Dan Posthuma – producer
- Dan Garcia – recording
- David Murphy – string recording
- Bill Schnee – mixing (1–6, 8–11)
- Paul "Salvo" Salveson – mixing (7)
- Hank Williams – mastering
- Loren Balman – art direction, photography
- Diana Barnes – art direction, original design
- Christy Coxe – additional art direction
- Franke Design – original design
- Chuck Hargett – additional design
- Matthew Barnes – photography
- Ray Ware – management

Studios

- Recorded at A to Z Studios (San Dimas, CA), Track Record (North Hollywood, California) and Great Circle Sound (Nashville, Tennessee).
- Mixed at Bill Schnee Studios (North Hollywood, California) and Woodland Studios (Nashville, Tennessee).
- Mastered at MasterMix (Nashville, Tennessee).
