= Death and state funeral of Chiang Kai-shek =

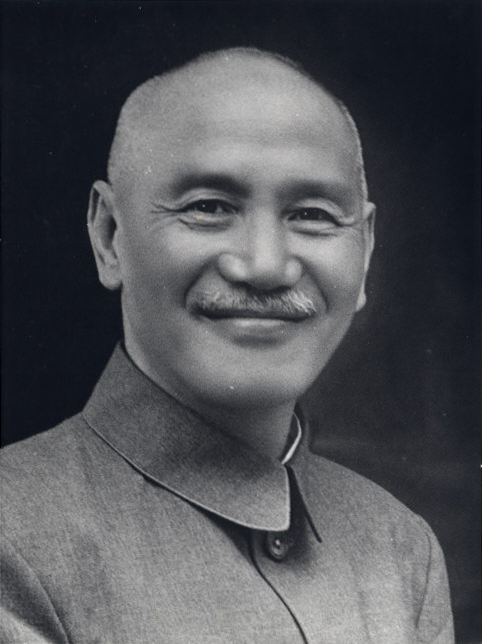
- Date: April 5–16, 1975
- Location: Taiwan
- Participants: Soong Mei-ling, Chiang Ching-kuo, Yen Chia-kan, Chow Lien-hwa, members of the Chiang family, members of the Government of the Republic of China, Taiwanese civilians, and foreign dignitaries

On April 5, 1975, at 23:50 TWT, Chiang Kai-shek, Generalissimo and President of the Republic of China, died of a heart attack resulting from kidney failure caused by advanced heart failure and pneumonia at the Taipei Veterans General Hospital in Taipei, Taiwan, at the age of 87.

== Death ==
Chiang's health had been gradually deteriorating during the 1970s. At the time of his death, he had not made a public appearance since 1972, after being diagnosed with pneumonia and undergoing surgery for an enlarged prostate. His son, Chiang Ching-kuo, was also appointed as his successor that same year.

On March 26, 1975, Chiang summoned members of the government to his official residence in Shilin to oversee the writing of his will.

On April 5, the morning of his death, and during the start of the Qingming Festival, Chiang appeared to be in somewhat decent health, however he began to experience abdominal discomfort and decreased urination in the afternoon. After going to bed at 20:00, Chiang suffered a heart attack at 22:20, upon which he was administered medical treatment, which proved to be unsuccessful. Chiang died at 23:50 with his wife, Soong Mei-ling, and eldest son, Chiang Ching-kuo, at his bedside.

The body of Chiang was then taken to the Taipei Veterans General Hospital at 02:30.

The Information Bureau of the Executive Yuan released a statement through the Central News Agency at 02:30 announcing his death, with Radio Taiwan International broadcasting the announcement at 03:00, and television stations CTS, TTV, and CTV announcing his death at 06:00, 12:00, and 12:00 respectively.

At an interim meeting at 7:00 the next day, the Central Standing Committee of the Kuomintang announced a month-long period of mourning with entertainment venues closed and all flags lowered to half mast. They also discussed basic details of the funeral. Vice President Yen Chia-kan was sworn in as president during a brief ceremony at the Presidential Office.

== Lying-in-state ==
On April 9, after a short ceremony at the Taipei Veterans General Hospital where a wreath was laid by President Yen Chia-kan, the bronze coffin with Chiang Kai-shek's body was carried by ten of his personal bodyguards onto a flower-covered truck which was then driven to the Sun Yat-sen Memorial Hall. An estimated 800,000 lined the route of the procession, bowing down and offering sacrifices, with Chiang's family and the 22 members of the Funeral Committee driving behind the coffin. Upon arriving at the Memorial Hall, the coffin was greeted by a guard of honour and an estimated crowd of 100,000 people. The coffin was then carried into the auditorium of the Memorial Hall where it was placed on a catafalque and the lid raised.

The body of Chiang Kai-shek was placed under a glass cover and was clothed in a traditional Chinese gown, with national decorations and medals of the Order of Brilliant Jade, the Order of the Blue Sky and White Sun, and the Order of National Glory also placed on the body. In the coffin contained four books with symbolic meaning to Chiang: a King James Version Bible, which he read daily and symbolised his Methodist faith; a book containing notes from Sun Yat-sen's Three Principles of the People philosophy of which he wrote two chapters; an anthology of Tang dynasty poems; and a book titled "Streams in the Desert" written by American missionary Lettie Cowman.

The coffin was placed on a slanted catafalque on the stage of the auditorium of the Memorial Hall and was surrounded by numerous banks of flowers, plants and trees. Directly behind the coffin was a giant portrait of Chiang, which was surrounded by the flags of the Republic of China and the Kuomintang and two large candles. 88 smaller wax candles adorned the edge of the stage, with a white cross of chrysanthemums placed at the foot of the coffin from Soong Mei-ling. On either side of the coffin stood a military guard of honour.

The Memorial Hall was open to the public and dignitaries to pay their respects to the late President's body. Mass crowds queued outside the Memorial Hall, with an estimated 280,000 people viewing Chiang's body on the first day. Initially it was decided that viewing times for the coffin would be from 07:00 in the morning to 21:00 in the evening when the hall would be closed, however due to the exponential number of crowds wanting to view the coffin the viewing times were changed by the Funeral Committee to be continuous over 24 hours. By the end of the lying in state an estimated 2.5 million people were reported to have viewed the coffin.

== Funeral and burial service ==
The state funeral for Chiang began at 08:00 on April 16 to a total of 2,800 government officials and foreign dignitaries. The service began with the laying of a wreath by President Yen while a traditional Chinese prayer was recited. Soong Mei-ling, Chiang Ching-kuo, Chiang Kai-shek's second son Chiang Wei-kuo, and two of his grandsons then stepped onto the stage for one last look at the President's body. At 8:09am, the glass cover above the coffin was removed and the coffin lid closed. All the mourners then rose to take three bows of respect. The flag of the Kuomintang was then placed on the coffin by President Yen Chia-kan and seven members of the Funeral Committee, while the flag of the Republic of China was placed over it by eight senior members of the Kuomintang.

The Christian service then began immediately after, with organ accompaniment and the singing of "Our God, Our Help in Ages Past". President Chiang's chaplain Chow Lien-hwa then recited Psalm 23 followed by a responsive reading and a moment of meditation. The Hua Hsing Taipei Children's Choir then sang the hymn "Nearer, My God, to Thee", and Chow Lien-hwa delivered a 50-minute eulogy titled "Another Witness", in which he praised Chiang as a national hero, stating that:

The "heroes of faith" in all times have triumphed over all adversities and suffering. The Bible calls these heroes of faith "witnesses" because they are living testimony to the Biblical teaching that faith is the greatest motivating force. . .

President Chiang did not hold to a superficial popular view of Christianity. What he believed was that this world is an arena where truth and evil, light and darkness, have constantly struggled since the beginning of time. Each generation is but a manifestation of a bout with Satan. However, President Chiang was not discouraged or depressed. . .

Today our President has been received into glory. Without us even requesting it, he has left us his last will and testament, asking that we carry on the great task of rebuilding our country. His faith in God deserves special attention, for I am sure he wanted to be remembered as a true follower of Christ. In the darkest hour he held to his faith and his faith sustained him. May the spirit who moved our President likewise move every member of our government and every citizen. May we rise and don his mantle.

Following the sermon, Chow Lien-hwa gave two prayers; one for the Kuomintang party, and one for the country. The congregation then sang "Lead, Kindly Light" before a Benediction was given and an Organ postlude played.

Following the conclusion of the Christian service, ten of Chiang's former bodyguards then lifted the coffin and slowly carried it out of the Memorial Hall and onto a flower-covered flatbed hearse to the sound of a 21 gun salute, a guard of honour, and the playing of Chopin's Funeral March by a military band. The procession then proceeded down the street surrounding the Hall, with Chow Lien-Hwa leading the procession and a pallbearer holding a chrysanthemum cross wreath walking behind him. The hearse then followed, with the 22 members of the Funeral Committee holding long white sashes onto the sides of the hearse while walking alongside it. The military guard of honour and the band of the Ministry of National Defense then followed behind the hearse, with a detachment of officers carrying each of Chiang Kai-Shek's medals. Directly behind the hearse walked Soong Mei-Ling, supported by Chiang Ching-kuo and Chiang Wei-kuo, with attending dignitaries following behind them.

The procession proceeded for about 480 metres before reaching the intersection of Kuanfu South Road and Jenai Road, where dignitaries got into limousines and followed the hearse for the journey to the Cihu Mausoleum. Soong Mei-ling and Chiang Ching-kuo also turned and bowed towards the dignitaries to thank them for attending the service. Millions of people lined the route of the cortege, paying their last respects.

Once the hearse arrived at the Mausoleum, a brief burial service was held, where wreaths from the President's family were laid, and the flags adorning the President's coffin were removed and folded. The President's coffin was then slowly placed in a black marble sarcophagus, which was sealed.

=== Present dignitaries ===
According to the government, envoys from the United States, South Korea, the Central African Republic, Jordan, Thailand, the Philippines, Saudi Arabia, Colombia, Nicaragua, the Ivory Coast, Paraguay, Uruguay, Japan, Lesotho, South Vietnam, South Africa, Costa Rica, El Salvador, Bolivia, Liberia, and Swaziland attended the funeral and/or the lying in state. Known dignitaries who attended are listed below:

- Nelson Rockefeller, Vice President of the United States
- Kim Jong-pil, Prime Minister of South Korea
- Elisabeth Domitien, Prime Minister of the Central African Republic
- Prakob Hutasingh, Former Deputy Prime Minister of Thailand
- Mohammed bin Omar Tawfiq, Minister of Transport for Saudi Arabia
- Eisaku Satō and Nobusuke Kishi, Former Prime Ministers of Japan
- Alwyn Schlebusch, Speaker of the House of Assembly of South Africa
- Edgar Sanchez Matarrita, Ambassador of Costa Rica to Taiwan
- Jose Enrique Quiroga Abasto, Ambassador of Bolivia to Taiwan
- Ernest Eastman, Ambassador of Liberia to Taiwan
- Adolfo Rafael Camarena, Ambassador of the Dominican Republic to Taiwan
- Hernando Ricardo, Chargé d'affaires of Colombia to Taiwan
- Querube Makalintal, Chief Justice of the Supreme Court of the Philippines
- Charles D. Molapo, Minister of Justice for Lesotho
- Trần Văn Lắm, President of the Senate of South Vietnam
- Pierre Nelson Coffi, Ambassador of Ivory Coast to Taiwan
- Zaid Rifai, Minister of Foreign Affairs of Jordan

== Reactions ==
- United States: In a statement, President Gerald Ford lauded Chiang Kai-shek as a "man of firm integrity, high courage, and deep political conviction." He stated that "Chiang's role in the modernization of China and his patriotic role as the leader of his nation during World War II have assured him an enduring place in Chinese history". Ford also appointed a nine-member delegation of government officials to attend the funeral, including Vice President Nelson Rockefeller, Hawaiian Senator Hiram Fong, Arizonian Senator Barry Goldwater, North Carolina Representative Roy A. Taylor, former Ambassador to Taiwan Walter P. McConaughy, Walter Judd, Anna Chennault, Arnold Beckman, and businessman Jack Eckerd. Former President Richard Nixon said that he found Chiang as "a man of keen intellect and of great gallantry, and of unwavering dedication to those principles in which he so fervently believed." 25 additional members of the Senate and 22 members of the House of Representatives also sent messages of condolence.
- South Korea: President Park Chung Hee, in a message of condolence, stated that: "Chiang not only made a great contribution to leading the Allied powers to victory when all mankind in the world was suffering from the extreme warfare of World War II. He actively supported the Korean independence movement, and since then he has made great achievements in laying the foundation for world peace and order."
- Japan: Due to the lack of diplomatic relations between Japan and the Republic of China when Chiang died, Prime Minister Takeo Miki made an "unofficial" statement expressing his condolences over Chiang's death as a private individual, which drew condemnation from the government of the People's Republic of China. Upon hearing this, it was decided that Eisaku Satō would represent the Liberal Democratic Party at the funeral as a private individual, and not as a representative of the government or political parties.
- Philippines: President Ferdinand Marcos, in a statement, said that "The death of Chiang Kai-shek marks the passing of an old protagonist in the Asian drama and the beginning of a new act in that drama", and that "the world cannot help but mourn the passing of such a leader."
- Guatemala: President Kjell Eugenio Laugerud García declared a nationwide three-day period of mourning, with flags lowered to half-mast.
- Holy See: Pope Paul VI issued a telegram to Soong Mei-ling, in which he offered condolences in "the sorrow you are experiencing at your husband's death." He also issued a telegram to Yen Chia-kan, in which he "commended Chiang to the mercy of the most High".
- People's Republic of China: The reaction to Chiang Kai-shek's death in mainland China was rather flat compared to reactions from most other countries due to the hostility between the two countries. The Xinhua News Agency published an article on April 6 reporting Chiang's death which was republished in multiple regional newspapers across China, in which it said:

Since Chiang Kai-shek betrayed the democratic revolution led by Dr. Sun Yat-sen in 1927, he has always been the symbol of imperialism, feudalism and bureaucratic capitalism in China, insisting on opposing the Communist Party and the people in a dictatorial and traitorous manner. His hands were stained with the blood of the Chinese revolutionary people. But his bloody rule has never stopped the progress of the wheel of history.

Under the leadership of the great leader, Chairman Mao, and the Communist Party, the Chinese people overthrew the reactionary rule of the Chiang Kai-shek clique after a long period of revolutionary armed struggle, established a new China for the people, and ushering in a new era in Chinese history.

After Chiang Kai-shek fled to Taiwan, he lingered under the protection of American imperialism where he continued to be an enemy of the Chinese people. The reactionary rule of the Chiang Kai-shek clique was strongly opposed by the people of Taiwan, and there were many internal contradictions. After Chiang Kai-shek's death, the people of Taiwan Province, who have a glorious patriotic tradition, will continue to fight for the liberation of Taiwan and the realisation of the reunification of the motherland.

The patriotic military and political personnel of the "Chiang gang" must have a clearer understanding of the situation and actively contribute to the liberation of Taiwan and the reunification of the motherland. The Chinese people must liberate Taiwan!

Despite this, there was no official government or Communist Party reaction to Chiang's death, but Mao Zedong, when informed of his death simply replied: "Understood". When bringing up Chiang's death in meetings with other leaders, he would only calmly state that he knew about it. Mao would himself die sixteen months and four days after Chiang.
