= Cowman =

Cowman may refer to:

- Cowman (profession)
- Cowman (surname)
- Cowboy
- Ken Shirk or Cowman, an American ultramarathon runner
- Cowman Publishing Company, publisher of books by Richard C. Halverson
- Cowman, a sept of Clan Cumming
- Cowman, Otis the Cow's alter ego in Back at the Barnyard

== See also ==
- "Farmer Bill's Cowman", a song by The Wurzels
- "Daniel Cowman", a song by Regina Spektor from Songs
- Reed Anthony, Cowman: An Autobiography, a 1907 book by Andy Adams
- Stockman (Australia), a person who looks after livestock on a station
