= Richard Reader Harris =

Richard Reader Harris and Reader Harris may refer to:

- Richard Reader Harris (barrister) (1847–1909), English barrister and Pentecostal Christian
- Richard Reader Harris (Conservative politician) (1913–2009), English MP
