= Juji Nakada =

Japanese evangelist (1870–1939)

Jūji Nakada
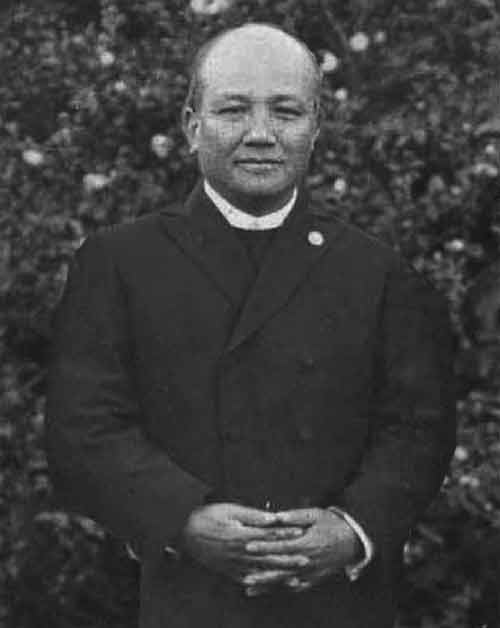
- Nakada in middle age
- Born: 29 October 1870; Tokyo, Japan
- Died: 24 September 1939 (aged 68)
- Occupation: Holiness evangelist

Juji Nakada (中田 重治, Nakada Jūji; 1870–1939) was a Japanese holiness evangelist, known as "the Dwight Moody of Japan" (Stark 28-29), who was the first bishop of the Japan Holiness Church and one of the co-founders of the Oriental Missionary Society (now One Mission Society).

== Biography ==
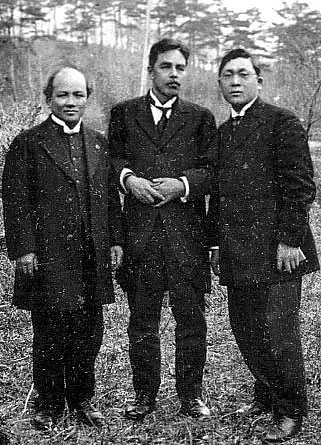
Nakada, Kanzō Uchimura, and Seimatsu Kimura

=== Personal history ===
Juji Nakada was born on 27 October 1870 in the northern town of Hirosaki in what is now Aomori prefecture, the son of Heisaku, "a samurai of the lowest rank in the Tsugaru domain."(Goodman 48) His father died when Nakada was four leaving his family impoverished. He was raised in the Methodist church. After studying in the Methodist Too college (Daimyo School), in 1888 he enrolled in Tokyo Eiwa Gakko, the forerunner of today's Aoyama Gakuin University, another Methodist institution. Pre-occupation with judo prevented his graduation. Nakada married on 23 February 1889. In 1891 he left to become a Methodist missionary to Yakumo, a small village on the island of Hokkaido. He subsequently served in Otaru, Etorofu island, and Odate in Akita Prefecture.

On 20 March 1911, Nakada's wife died, leaving his only son, Ugo. Five months later Nakada married Ayame. On 14 September 1939, she died of uterine cancer. Ten days later, on 24 September 1939, Nakada died of intestinal tuberculosis at the age of 68.

=== Moody Bible Institute (1896–1898) ===
After the death of his first son, and the illness of his wife, Katsuko, Nakada experienced a deep crisis of faith. (Goodman 49) Nakada, while already an effective evangelist, experienced dryness in his soul: "'If I don't find the power of the Holy Ghost,' he told his wife before he left Japan, 'I'll come back, leave the ministry, and become a dentist.'"(McCasland 77)Soon after, in 1896 Nakada traveled to Chicago, Illinois and enrolled at the Moody Bible Institute.

While studying at MBI, Nakada befriended a Western Union executive, Charles Elmer Cowman (1868-1924) and his wife, Lettie Burd Cowman (1870-1960); and Ernest A. Kilbourne (1865-1928) and his wife, Julia, (some sources say Hazel) through the Grace Methodist Episcopal Church. While studying at MBI he met holiness theologian Rev A.M. Hills, who gave him a copy of his book "Holiness and Power". Mrs Cowman records:

As he earnestly sought to be filled with the HOLY SPIRIT, it was not long until his hungry heart was satisfied. Having come so definitely into the blessings, he soon felt strongly impressed that GOD would send him back to his people to preach full salvation to them.

Nakada was also influenced by the writings of John Wesley (McCasland 77); an association with J.R. Boynton, a Chicago physician who practised faith healing(Goodman 49); and Martin Wells Knapp, who later founded God's Bible School in Cincinnati, Ohio in 1901.(McCasland 77)

=== Return to Japan (1898–1900) ===
In September 1898 Nakada returned to Japan after meeting Barclay Fowell Buxton, leaders of the English holiness movement in England. In 1899 Nakada was appointed a traveling evangelist in the Methodist church, although he preached beyond that denomination. He was supported financially by the Cowmans and Kilbournes, who have formed the Telegraphers Missions Band in Chicago. Also in 1899 he started the Japan Holiness Journal.(Bays 486)

=== Central Gospel Mission (1900–1904) ===
In 1900 Nakada left the Methodist church and founded the Central Gospel Mission (Chuo Fukuin Dendokan) in Jinbo-cho in central Tokyo. The Cowmans left for Japan on 1 February 1901 as the first missionaries of the Pilgrim Holiness church. (Bundy 711) Soon after the arrival of the Cowmans, Nakada helped establish the Tokyo Bible Institute (later Tokyo Bible Seminary) and became its first president. The goal of the mission group, which by 1902 included Ernest and Julia Kilbourne and their three children, was to "establish self-supporting, self-governing, and self-propagating churches on the William Taylor model" (Bundy 711). The hall held Bible classes in the daytime and was the venue for evangelistic services in the evening. (Goodman 49) By 1903 the Central Gospel Mission had outgrown its hall and relocated to a new building in Kashiwagi, Yodobashi-cho.

=== Oriental Missionary Society (1904–1917) ===
In 1904 the name was changed to the Oriental Missionary Society (Toyo senkyokai) with an enlarged focus on all of East Asia, including Korea and China. A conflict between Cowman and Nakada over the leadership of the OMS resulted in a split in 1911, with the Cowmans heading the OMS and Nakada as the head of the new Japan Holiness Church (Nihon seikyodan). While there would be reconciliation later, there was lasting damage in the relationship.

==== Korea (1904) ====
During the Russo-Japanese War of 1904-1905 Nakada served as a chaplain under General Kuroki Tamemoto.(Stark 481) Nakada secured permission from the Japanese government to minister to Japanese troops fighting in Manchuria. As he passed through Korea, Nakada preached "wherever the opportunity arose. Two Koreans in particular, Chung Bin and Kim Sang-jun, were profoundly moved by Nakada's preaching on "the glorious experience of sanctification....The two Koreans, burdened about their struggle for the life of holiness, were left with no source of spiritual guidance. Providentially, they met a Korean doctor who knew Nakada and had visited the OMS Bible Training Institute in Tokyo. He urged that they visit the school. Deciding it must be the place for them to hear more about the experience they were seeking, Chung and Kim unexpectedly showed up in Tokyo one day in 1904." Out of these contacts, Cowman and Kilbourne were able to start the OMS work in Korea in 1907.

==== Manchuria (1904–1905) ====
Nakada left Korea to serve as chaplain in Manchuria until the end of the Russo-Japanese War.

==== Evangelism in Britain and the USA (1906–1907) ====
In early 1906 Nakada went to Britain "ostensibly to rest and be spiritually recharged."(McCasland 93) While there he became friends with Scottish holiness preacher Oswald Chambers. Nakada preached throughout the British Isles, including preaching holiness to the recent converts of the 1904–1905 Welsh Revival(McCasland 94) with American Quaker evangelist Charles Stalker, and also throughout Scotland and England with Chambers. After almost a year in Britain, Nakada departed on 6 November 1906 with Chambers for the USA on the SS Baltic. After a ten-day crossing of the Atlantic Ocean, Nakada and Chambers spent five weeks preaching on the East Coast, before moving to Cincinnati, Ohio to preach in the Christmas Holiness Convention at God's Bible School.[McCasland 104) Nakada travelled throughout the USA preaching often. He returned to Cincinnati in June 1907 to preach during another ten-day holiness convention. On 10 July 1907 Nakada and Chambers departed from Seattle, Washington on the SS Shinano Maru, and arrived in Yokohama on 27 July 1907.(Stark 3ff).

=== Oriental Missionary Holiness Church (1917–1928) ===
In 1917 the Oriental Missionary Holiness Church (Toyo senyokai horinesu kyokai) was organised with Nakada as the first bishop.(Bays 486)(Goodman 50) Nakada wrote that the purpose of the new organisation was: "as the name indicates, a missionary society. Our purpose is simple: to propagate the complete Gospel, that is, the Foursquare Gospel (salvation, holiness, the Second Coming of Christ, and healing) all over Japan"(Goodman 50)

==== Second Advent Movement ====
On 6 January 1918, Nakada and Uchimura Kanzō began the Second Advent Movement. Rallies were held throughout Japan with up to two thousand attending. While Uchimura and Nakada were momentarily united by their shared devotion to preaching the Second Coming, there were significant theological differences between them. Uchimura, influenced by neo-orthodox thought, rejected the idea of a literal millennium and calculating the dates of Christ's Second Coming. Nakada's beliefs that the Jews and Japanese descended from a common ancestor and that the salvation of the Jews would result in the salvation of the Japanese resulted in Uchimura leaving in 1920.

==== Revival in Tokyo (1919–1920) ====
Toward the end of November 1919, as a result of evangelistic preaching and prayer, a revival broke out at the Yodobashi Holiness church in Tokyo. It spread to other churches in the city. While not resulting in the conversion of non-Christians, according to Nakada it had the following results:

(1) the qualitative development of the membership;
(2) an increase in giving;
(3) the spiritual unity with men of other denominations (mostly pastors) who shared in the revival meetings;
(4) an increase in the spirit of evangelism. (McGavran 197)

==== Japan Holiness Church in America ====
By 1920, Nakada was "one of the most influential evangelists in Japan". In October 1920, Nakada toured the United States, preaching at several Japanese churches in Los Angeles. Initially some of the converts of the evangelistic campaign were nurtured by Nakada's son, Rev. Ugo Nakada. By April 1921 this group became the first Japan Holiness Church in San Lorenzo, California. Nakada returned in 1929 to dedicate the church building on 13 October.(Koga 160) In 1920, Nakada also held meetings at Asbury College in Wilmore, Kentucky.

=== Japan Holiness Church (1928–1936) ===
In 1928 the Japan Holiness Church gained full independence from the OMS. (Bays 486) Nakada was able to say: "Our Holiness Church is, of course, not an agency of the European church, but a genuine Japanese church." (Dicker 159) The church had been truly indigenous since 1922. (Edwards 81)

==== Japan Holiness Church of Brazil (1929) ====
In 1929 Nakada visited the Japan Holiness Church of Brazil, which had been established by Takeo Monobe, a missionary from the Japan Holiness Church, in July 1925 primarily among Japanese immigrants (Mizuki 56; Edwards 81) Arriving in May 1929, Nakada spent five weeks in Brazil preaching and strengthening the church, which was a district of his denomination until its independence in 1934, when it became the Evangelical Holiness Church of Brazil (Igreja Evangélica Holiness do Brasil).(Mizuki 59)(Edwards 80-81)

==== Revival (1930–1933) ====
On 19 May 1930 there was another revival at the Tokyo Seminary (Tokyo Seisho Gakuin) of the Japan Holiness Church, as a result of the fervent prayer of the students.

Juji Nakada and Masakichi Ichimiya were leading them. In the evening of May 19, when about 70 coed students were praying for revival, a fire of the Holy Spirit poured down on them. The students and professors danced around the large Cowman Hall praising loudly; Yutaka Yoneda danced too much so he tore his Achilles’ tendon, and finally the floorboard of the hall fell out. A hymn that was sung at that time was the Seika No. 576, “The Holy Spirit comes.”

McGavran indicates:

When suddenly the prayer meeting turned into one of intensity and excitement, some students recognized this to be the revival and rushed to the homes of their professors with the news. They too joined the meeting and prayed shoulder to shoulder in loud voices. There were some who even began dancing. They continued to pray. When Nakada returned to Tokyo from his trip to Korea and Manchuria, he encouraged the Holiness churches in Tokyo to hold prayer meetings from May 30 to June 7. And on June 8, a Pentecostal meeting was held at the seminary. For the next two and a half years, various revival meetings were held in many different cities in Japan. The leaders of the Holiness Church traveled extensively, preached often, and prayed intensely. (197)

[T]he fire of the Holy Spirit spread to Kansai, the Nihon Dendotai Seisho Gakusha of Kobe, the Osaka Methodist Church, and to the Church of the Nazarene. For the revival rally of the Tokyo Seisho Gakuin of October 23, 3,000 people attended, and “the Preparatory Revival Alliance for the Second Coming” was organized. As the results of it, 4,311 were baptized and the membership reached 12,046 at the Japan Holiness Church, and it joined the rank of the Japanese large church. However, for the reason unknown the fire of the revival reached its peak at the meeting of the summer of 1933 (8th year of Showa) and it gradually cooled off.

From an initial membership of 1,600 and 46 churches in 1917, the Japan Holiness Church had 19,523 members in 1932. (Mullins, Christianity, 105) After 1930 the denomination's refusal to sanction Shinto state worship led to increasing persecution.

==== Schism (1933–1936) ====
According to Goodman, "Nakada's shift of emphasis away from the salvation of individual souls to collective, national salvation alienated some of his followers."(Goodman 57) As Yamamori suggests:

The doctrinal emphases had always been placed on justification, sanctification, divine healing, and the Second Coming of Christ. To this list, Nakada now wished to add a fifth point, that Christ's Second Coming would be possible only through the restoration of Israel. Therefore, he admonished the members to pray for this to take place. To many it seemed as though Nakada believed that by praying for the salvation of the Jews the Japanese race might be saved. This was in direct conflict with the traditional view that salvation was an individual matter."

As Bishop of the Holiness Church, Nakada expected all seminary teachers and pastors to accept his new vision, but many leaders rejected his authority, which led to a schism. Nakada fired five of the teachers at his training institute for refusing to teach his beliefs, and they responded by accusing him of fascism. In October 1936 the church split into two separate denominations (both rendered in English as the Holiness Church) Kiyome Kiyoki led by Nakada, and Nihon seikyokai led by the defectors.(Goodman 57)

==== Death (1939) ====
Nakada's wife died on 14 September 1939 of uterine cancer. Nakada died ten days later, on 24 September 1939, of intestinal tuberculosis.

== Beliefs ==
Goodman describes Nakada's views as chiliastic fundamentalism. Nakada indicates that his views were influenced by W.B. Godbey's Commentary on the Book of Revelation.

=== The Japanese and the Jews ===
Nakada was deeply influenced by American evangelist and Christian Zionist William Eugene Blackstone's 1878 book Jesus is Coming, one of the first popular books to advocate the literal premillennial return of Jesus Christ to restore Israel. Nakada's belief that the Japanese were the descendants of the ten lost tribes of Israel, and that Israel would be restored through the Japanese people, divided the Japan Holiness Church.(Bays 486)

Juji Nakada first preached about Israel's restoration at a 1931 camp meeting on Japan's northern coast at Matsushima. For three days he preached on God's promises to Israel and implored Japanese believers to pray for the restoration of Israel and the salvation of the Jewish people....He wrote, 'We should not read books that defame the Jewish people (The Elders of the Protocols of Zion was a popular book in Nakada's day) nor should we despise and ostracize them.' He explained that the then current stream of immigrants back to Israel was 'to keep God's promise to Abraham and to prove the certainty of the prophesy [sic].'

Nakada was also influenced in his thinking by the writings of Nicholas McLeod:

The Japanese have been considered by some early travelers and explorers to be descendants of the Ten Lost Tribes. This theory was formulated by N. McLeod, a Scottish missionary who arrived in Japan in 1867. McLeod detailed his observations, interpretations and speculations in Epitome of the Ancient History of Japan, a book published in Nagasaki in 1875. He described what he thought to be proofs of the origin of the Japanese people from the Ten Lost Tribes. He endeavored in an elaborate way to reconstruct and explain the ancient Japanese history according to his interpretation of the Bible and its sacred history. McLeod's ideas were adopted by a number of European Christian missionaries, but they also became popular with some Japanese, especially among those who converted to Christianity. Bishop Juji Nakada (1869-1939), of the Holiness Church Movement, Dr. Zen'ichiro Oyabe, and Dr. Chikao Fujisawa, a lecturer at Nihon University, were among the most outspoken supporters of the theory linking the origin of the Japanese people to the Ten Lost Tribes. They described their findings and beliefs in books published in Japan during the first half of the 20th century.

In his 1933 book, Japan in the Bible, Nakada indicated: "I should like to prove that Israelitish blood runs mixed in the Japanese veins and in this we are not without historical evidences." (44) According to Louis Kraar,

This nationalistic attitude reflects a theory, spread by Japanese Christian theologians in the 1930s, that the Japanese and the Jews sprang from a common ancestry. That notion appealed in part because it made the Japanese a chosen people--and provided a handy justification for imperialism. Nakada Juji, the son of a samurai who studied at the Moody Bible Institute in Chicago, came home to preach that even Japan's military forces were playing a divine role.

According to Goodman, Nakada became a supporter of Japanese militarism because he believed the Japanese military were (unknowingly) serving God's purposes. (Goodman 53) Nakada "saw the Jews as mystical saviors whose redemption would ensure the political and military, as well as spiritual, salvation of the Japanese." (Goodman 39) Nakada wrote in Japan in the Bible:

The Japanese are an inter-mixture of the three original races i.e. the Shemitic [sic], Hamitic, and Japhetic - for the Jews are the descendents [sic] of Shem, the Hittites, of Ham, and the Ainus of Japheth. (The Ainus should be classified among the white people as the Aryan or Caucasian people). Thus, we see here the wonderful amalgamation of all three races in one wonderful Japanese race which cannot be found anywhere else...no other race has ever been the product of a supernatural welding of these three races. Here I again say that the Japanese must be a chosen people charged with a special mission toward the entire world. (44-45)

=== Ratana Church ===
When the founder of a Māori church, Tahupotiki Wiremu Ratana was delayed by a dock strike in Japan in 1924 Nakada found the group suitable accommodation. Ratana had many similar ideas to Nakada, and in particular: "...thought that both Maori and Japanese were among the lost tribes of Israel..." and a strong bond was formed, which saw Nakada travel to New Zealand to co-conduct the second formal opening of the church's Temple at Ratana Pa.

=== Shrine Shinto ===
Nakada’s statement on the shrine issue appeared in the church publication, Friends of Holiness, on 30 January 1930:

Some people in authority in the Bureau of Religions have set forth the idea that Shrine Shinto is not a religion, and thus have disposed of the issues very simply. In the name of ancestor veneration it has been schemed that everyone be required to bow at a Shinto shrine. But religion is not a thing that can be dealt with so simply at the hands of politicians who know nothing about spiritual things…. Even if one skillfully says that the religious content is negligible, to the average person’s life there could be nothing more intimately related than this existential religion. We have no choice but to here and now go on record that no matter what happens we will never bow at a Shinto shrine! The reason we make this clear is that we may be silenced by those who say that we are disloyal and lack filial piety. We are prepared to take Article Twenty-eight of the Constitution, that guarantees religious freedom, as a shield and argue our case ad infinitum. If there is an infringement of freedom of religion in any part of the country I hope that you will notify us immediately. We are prepared to face persecution! If it is the Lord’s will, at any time we are completely ready to become a sacrifice. This is the attitude with which we work. (translation by Merwin 1983, p. 266) (Mullins 273)

Ten years after this strong statement against shrine worship, Nakada’s followers would become the “sacrifice”. According to Mark Mullins:

Holiness members had refused to participate in jinja sanpai (shrine worship), and many kept their children from participating in shrine visits sponsored by the public schools. The Tokkõ also knew from a number of church publications that many Holiness leaders held essentially the same eschatological views as the sectarian groups that had already been investigated. While they refused to participate in Shrine visits, the Holiness leaders made every effort to express support for the emperor and (to my knowledge) never made any public statements against the war. As early as the third general assembly of the Holiness Church in 1932 (that is, almost a decade before it entered the Kyõdan), the church declared that it would protect and honor the central place of the emperor in obedience to the Scriptures (Romans 13). Almost a decade later (1941), at the first general meeting of block six (one section of the Holiness congregations that were incorporated into the Kyõdan), the service began with singing the national anthem, obeisance in the direction of the Imperial Palace, and silent prayer for those who had given their lives on the battlefield for the Emperor. On another occasion, the pastor leading a meeting of block six stopped the proceedings during a bombing raid by US planes and asked all those in attendance to pray for Japan’s victory and the safety of the emperor. These pastors were hardly political subversives, but their basic eschatological convictions nevertheless clashed with the claims of the state. In the end, a total of 131 Holiness clergy were arrested for violations of the Peace Preservation Law and abandoned by the Kyõdan in their time of trial. (Mullins 273-274)

Mullins indicates that 71 Holiness pastors were arrested and 14 were eventually sentenced. It was Nakada's belief in a literal thousand year reign of Christ that created the difficulties for the arrested Holiness members:

Fujikawa Takurō, the lawyer for thirteen Holiness ministers, argued that the investigators of this case ... mistakenly assumed that all Holiness ministers followed the interpretation of Bishop Nakada, who in 1933 developed the position that the salvation of the Jews and earthly return and millennial reign of Christ were indispensable ingredients of a biblical eschatology. According to Fujikawa, it was the belief in a literal one thousand-year reign of Christ that was creating the conμict with the government. In the appeal, Fujikawa explained that the reference to the millennial reign of Christ appears in apocalyptic literature (Revelation 20:4) and should not be interpreted literally, as Nakada and some other groups had done. (Mullins 274)

== Books by Nakada ==
- Nakada, Juji. Nihonjin to Yudayajin 日本人とユダヤ人 [Japanese and Jews]. Ed. by Okamoto Fumiko. Tōyō Senkyōkai Hōrinesu Kyōkai Shuppanbu, 1935 (scan).
- Nakada, Juji. An Unknown Nation. Trans. by B. Kida. Tokyo: Oriental Missionary Society, Japan Holiness Church, Publishing Dept., 1933.
- Nakada, Juji. Japan in the Bible. Oriental Missionary Society, Japan Holiness Church, Publishing Dept., 1933.
- Nakada, Jūji, trans. Mattaki ai 全き愛 [Perfect Love] by J.A. Wood. Tōyō Senkyōkai Hōrinesu Kyōkai Shuppanbu, Shōwa 6 [1931].

== Sources and further reading ==
- Bays, Daniel H. "Juji Nakada" in Biographical Dictionary of Christian Missions, 486. Edited by Gerald H. Anderson. Grand Rapids, MI: Eerdmans, 1999.
- Bundy, David. "OMS International", 711. In Evangelical Dictionary of World Missions. Edited by A. Scott Moreau. Grand Rapids, MI: Baker Academic, 2000.
- Cho, Chongnahm. "Theological Roots and Emphasis of the OMS-Holiness Church." Online, Focuses on Korean Holiness church.
- Choi, Meesaeng Lee. "Scriptural Holiness and Eschatology as a Vision of the New Creation: From the Story of Sang-Jun Kim and Juji Nakada". Journal of Sungkyul (Holiness) Theology 1 [2004]: 322–44.oxford-institute.org
- Cowman, Lettie B. Charles E. Cowman: Missionary, Warrior. Oriental Missionary Society, 1928. The life of Charles Cowman, one of the founders of the Oriental Missionary Society (present-day OMS International). As a telegraph operator in Chicago, Charles led 75 of his co-workers to Christ within six months of his own conversion. After forming the Telegraph's Mission Band, Charles and wife, Lettie, arrived in Japan on February 1, 1901, to work with Juji Nakada in evangelisation, church planting, and training. Online edition
- Cunningham, Floyd T. "Mission Policy and National Leadership in the Church of the Nazarene: Japan, 1905-1965." Wesleyan Theological Journal 28. Online References Nakada's relationship with the Church of the Nazarene and other holiness groups in Japan.
- Dicker, Herman. Wanderers and Settlers in the Far East: A Century of Jewish Life in China and Japan. Twayne Publishers, 1962. Pages 58–60 focus on Nakada's support for the Jews: "Nakada had fought hard for the equality of races and been a staunch battler against anti-Semitism."(59)
- Duewel, Wesley L. Heroes of the Holy Life. Grand Rapids, MI: Zondervan, 2002. References Nakada and his connection with Oswald Chambers.
- Edwards, Fred E. The Role of the Faith Mission: A Brazilian Case Study. South Pasadena, CA: William Carey Library, 1971. See pages 80–81 for role of Nakada in establishment of Holiness Church in Brazil.
- Engel, Tamar. "The Jews of Kobe". (Summer 1995) Members of Nakada's Holiness Church assisted the Jewish refugees of Kobe. They prayed for them also.
- Erny, Edward and Esther Erny. No Guarantee but God: The Story of the Founders of OMS International. Greenwood, IN: Oriental Missionary Society, 1969.
- Goodman, David G. and Masanori Miyazawa. Jews in the Japanese Mind: The History and Uses of a Cultural Stereotype. New York: The Free Press, 1995.
- Hebert, David G. (2008). Music Transculturation and Identity in a Maori Brass Band Tradition. In R. Camus & B. Habla, Eds. Alta Musica, 26. Tutzing: Schneider, pp. 173–200. Discusses "some musical implications of the historical relations between Maori prophet Tahupotiki Wiremu Ratana (1873-1939) and Japanese Rev. Juji Nakada (1870-1939), as reflected in contemporary brass bands and liturgical practices."
- Katō, Tsuneaki (加藤常昭). 中田重治 = [Nakada Jūji]. 日本キリスト教団出版局, Tōkyō : Nihon Kirisutokyōdan Shuppankyoku, 2003.
- Kilbourne, Edwin W. Bridge Across the Century. Volume I: Japan, Korea, China. Greenwood, IN: OMS, 2001. A narrative history, 100 years of OMS in Asia 1901-2001.
- Kim, Sung Ho. History of the Korea Evangelical Holiness Church. Edited by the History Compilation Committee of the Korea Evangelical Holiness Church. Translated by Chun-Hoi Heo and Hye-Kyung Heo (Seoul: Living Waters, 1998). Review in Wesleyan Theological Journal 35:2 (Fall 2000):251 by David Bundy. Discusses role of Nakada in formation of the Korean Holiness church.
- Koga, Sumio. A Centennial Legacy: History of the Japanese Christian Missions in North America 1877-1977; Volume I. Nobart, 1977. Page 120 for an account of Nakada's visit to Los Angeles in May 1920, and 160 for the Japan Holiness Church in San Lorenzo, California and Nakada's role in starting it.
- Koschmann, J. Victor. Review of "Jews in the Japanese Mind: The History and Uses of a Cultural Stereotype by David G. Goodman and Masanori Miyazawa". Journal of Japanese Studies 23:2 (Summer 1997):463-467.
- Kraar, Louis. Japan's Bizarre Jewish Thing: A Fresh Look at Japanese Exceptionalism." Fortune (20 March 1995). Mentions Nakada's beliefs.
- Lee, Kun Sam. The Christian Confrontation with Shinto Nationalism: A Historical and Critical Study of the Conflict of Christianity and Shinto in Japan in the period. (Philosophical and Historical Studies). Presbyterian & Reformed, 1962. References Nakada's Second Advent Movement (130) and prosecution of Holiness Church ministers for their position on Shinto (159ff).
- McCasland, David. Oswald Chambers: Abandoned to God: The Life Story of the Author of My Utmost for His Highest.
- McGavran, Donald, ed. Church Growth Bulletin: Second Consolidated Volume, September 1969 to July 1975. Bulletin of the Institute of Church Growth, Fuller Theological Seminary, Pasadena, California. South Pasadena, CA: William Carey Library, . See page 197 for a good summary of the revivals in the Holiness Church of Japan and Nakada's assessment of the results.
- Marciel, Doris and the Hayward Area Historical Society. San Lorenzo: Images of America. Arcadia Publishing, 206. See page 31 for photo of Nakada at the dedication of the church building of the Japan Holiness Church in San Lorenzo, California in 1929.
- Merwin, John Jennings. "The Oriental Missionary Society Holiness Church in Japan, 1901-1983". Unpublished D.Miss. thesis. Fuller Theological Seminary, 1983.
- Merwin, John Jennings. The Oriental Missionary Society Holiness Church in Japan, 1901-1983. Ann Arbor, MI : University Microfilms International, 1990.
- Minagawa, John H. "Preface to Japanese Missionology (7): Christianity that came to Japan [Fifth Wave] Continuation of Arrival of Euro-American Christianity (1) 1859 ~ 1945." Intercessors for Japan Newsletter (20 September 2003).
- Mizuki, John. The Growth of Japanese Churches in Brazil. South Pasadena, CA: William Carey Library, 1978. See pages 56–71 for account of the formation of the Evangelical Holiness Church of Brazil and Nakada's role.
- Mullins, Mark R. Christianity Made in Japan: A Study of Indigenous Movements. Nanzan Library of Asian Religion and Culture. Honolulu, HI: University of Hawaii Press, 1998.
- Mullins, Mark R. "Ideology and Utopianism in Wartime Japan: An Essay on the Subversiveness of Christian Eschatology." Japanese Journal of Religious Studies 21:2/3 (1994):261-280. Discusses Holiness Church of Japan's relationship to Japanese state during World War II. Online
- Oliver, Revilo P. "The Yellow Peril." 1983. Revilo P. Oliver was an ulta-conservative. Disparaging critique of McLeod's theory that Japan was descended from the lost tribes of Israel. He adds: "I gather that the hariolations of Professors Fujisawa and Anasaki inspired the foundation of a Holiness Church, of which the Bishop, Juju Nakada, proclaims that "it is God's will that these two nations [the Ten Tribes who hit the road for Japan in 722 B.C. and the Two Tribes who have been vampires on the goyim in the rest of the world] be united after 3,000 years."
- Randall, Ian M. "The Pentecostal League of Prayer: A Transdenominational British Wesleyan-Holiness Movement." Wesleyan Theological Journal 33:1. References relationship between Nakada and Oswald Chambers.
- Sherrill, Michael J. "Nakada Juji (1870-1939)." In The New Westminster Dictionary of Church History, ed. Robert Benedetto. Princeton, NJ: Westminster John Knox Press.
- Stalker, Charles H. Twice Around the World with the Holy Ghost: Or, The Impressions and Convictions of the Mission Field. Columbus, OH: Charles H. Stalker, 1906. Many B&W photographs of missionary activity in India, China, Japan, and elsewhere. A Quaker evangelist travelling through England, France, Palestine, India, China and Japan. Involved with Nakada.
- Stark, Gilbert Little. Letters of Gilbert Little Stark, July 23, 1907-March 12, 1908. Cambridge: Riverside Press, Gilbert Little Stark, 1908; Cornell University Library. Online edition Records Little's journey across the Pacific with Nakada in July 1907 and subsequent encounters with him in Japan. See pages 28–29 for description of Nakada as "the Moody of Japan" and a "pocket dynamo" and ability to change clothing to suit preaching occasion. See pages 481-485 for Stark's impressions of Nakada and details of Nakada's life and ministry.
- Thomas, Paul Westphal. The Days of Our Pilgrimage: The History of the Pilgrim Holiness Church. Marion, IN: Wesley Press, 1976. See Chapter on the Cowmans in Japan for beginnings of the OMS in Japan and role of Nakada. Cowmans and Kilbournes were Pilgrim Holiness members. See page 27 for photo of Charles H Stalker, 37 for photo of the Cowmans, 39 for photo of the Kilbournes.
- Wood, Robert D. In These Mortal Hands: The Story of the Oriental Missionary Society: The First Fifty Years. 1983. Traces OMS mission during its first 50 years.
- Yamamori, Tetsunao. Church Growth in Japan: A Study in the Development of the Eight Denominations. South Pasadena, CA: William Carey Library, 1974.
- Yoneda, Isamu (米田勇). 中田重治伝: 伝記中田重治"= [Nakada Jūji den: denki Nakada Jūji]. [Biography of Jyuji Nakada] Tokyo: Nakada Jyuji Den Kenko Kai, 1959. 大空社, Tōkyō : Ōzorasha, 1996.
- Yoneda, Yutaka and Takayama Keiki. Showa no Shukyo Dan'atsu. Tokyo: Word of Life Press, 1964. Details the persecution of the Japan Holiness Church in World War II.

== Audio resources ==
- James, Grant. "Juji Nakada". Did You Hear? Radio Broadcast. (accessed 18 August 2008).
