= Ernest A. Kilbourne =

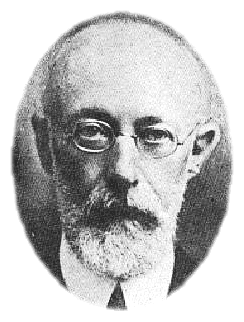
Ernest Kilbourne.

Ernest Albert Kilbourne (March 13, 1865 – April 13, 1928) was a missionary evangelist to Japan. He is best known for being a cofounder of the Oriental Missionary Society (now One Mission Society; formerly OMS International).

== Early life ==
Ernest A. Kilbourne was born on March 13, 1865, in Niagara Falls, Ontario, Canada. Two years after his birth, his family moved to the villages of Conestogo and Winterbourne in Ontario. His father established a general store, which contained a district telegraph and post office. The Kilbourne family attended a Methodist church. By the age of 14, Kilbourne was employed in a telegraphy job, and while still in his teens, he left Ontario to work with the Western Union in the United States.

At the age of 21, Kilbourne was determined to become a writer and to see the world. He set out from New York on a trip around the world. He went to Europe, South Africa, Australia, New Zealand, and the Hawaiian Islands. Once back in the U.S., he began working as a telegraph operator in Virginia City, Nevada, where he met and fell in love with Julia Pittinger. A Catholic woman, Pittinger had been born in Virginia City and was one of 17 children. They were married by the Reverend Laurence Ridgely of St. Paul’s Episcopal Church on June 30, 1888.

After marrying, Kilbourne requested a transfer to the thriving city of Chicago, where he had hope of becoming a successful telegrapher. He was transferred and, in a short time, became divisional chief along with a man named Charles Cowman.

== Conversion ==
One day, Cowman, who had recently become a passionate Christian, approached Kilbourne at work and evangelized to him for half of an hour. Kilbourne remained silent through Cowman’s message, and his lack of response led Cowman to believe he had failed in one of his first endeavors to share the Gospel. However, much to Charles’ surprise, Ernest entered the workplace the following day and announced, "I went home last night after our conversation and did just what you told me. It is all settled and I gave myself to Christ," (Page 20).

Kilbourne joined the Grace Methodist Church and also began night classes at the Moody Bible Institute. He began to witness to friends and coworkers, and he and Cowman would even place tracts in mailboxes on their walks home from work. A pivotal moment for Kilbourne and Cowman occurred when the two men attended a missionary convention where they heard founder of the Christian and Missionary Alliance, A. B. Simpson, speak. Simpson’s message about missions gave the men the opportunity to have their minds and hearts opened to missionary work.

== Oriental Missionary Society ==
In 1901, Charles and Lettie Cowman left for Japan to begin their work in overseas missions. Kilbourne was left in charge of the Telegraphers Mission Band, a group of Christian telegraphers that met together weekly to pray and study the Bible. They also gave a monthly offering to missions and sent Gospel tracts to other telegraphers around the world. Although Kilbourne wanted to join the Cowmans on their venture to Japan, he had unfinished business in the States. During and after working for a previous employer, Kilbourne had misused a free pass that had been given to him. After becoming a Christian, Kilbourne had vowed to pay the company back the money he had cheated them out of. Therefore, he remained in the U.S. in order to fulfill his promise. A year later, his debt had been repaid, and Kilbourne set out for Japan with his family, which now included Esther Lois, Ila and Edwin (Bud) Lawson. They arrived at the port of Yokohama in August 1902.

Charles and Lettie Cowman arrived in Tokyo, Japan on February 22, 1901. There, they worked with the preacher Juji Nakada and his wife, ministering to the Japanese. After converting to Christianity, Nakada wrote to Dwight L. Moody and asked if he could help him learn more about Christianity. Following Moody’s advice, Nakada traveled to the U.S. in 1897 and eventually met Cowman. Together Charles, Lettie and Juji worked together to begin ministering in Japan. On March 23, 1901, the first student appeared at the door of their newly founded Bible institute, and on April 2, they opened Central Gospel Mission. Students quickly filled the new school. So many students, in fact, that they outgrew the facility, and on October 31, 1904, they moved into a more spacious building.

Kilbourne had always been passionate for journalism, so after he arrived in Japan, he began a newsletter, Electric Messages, in November 1902 with the purpose of sharing reports of the work in Japan with telegraphers, friends and supporters back home. The magazine contained inspirational stories of God’s power and was filled with jargon that the telegraphers would be familiar with. In 1914, it was renamed The Oriental Missionary Society, after Jeremiah 50:2, which reads, "Declare ye among the nations and publish and set ye up a standard."

In less than six years, Cowman and Kilbourne reported having 12 branch missions and 22 Japanese pastors, wives and "Bible women." Students spent two years at the Bible institute, a year in an interior station, and then came back to the institute for a sort of post-graduate work. Students were constantly out in the communities, evangelizing, preaching and handing out tracts. Within 30 years, more than 2,000 students had graduated from the Bible school, (Page 56).

== The Great Village Campaign ==
Kilbourne, Cowman and Nakada, along with their wives, were reaching many Japanese with the message of Christ, and many of them had become Christians. However, the missionaries desired that all would hear. Although such a feat sounded unattainable, they began The Great Village Campaign of 1912–18. The goal of the campaign was to place Gospel literature into every one of the 10.3 million Japanese homes. Within the seven years of the campaign, their goal was reached. Kilbourne said, of handing out the Christian literature, "It is not an unusual thing for us to pass out 50,000 or more tracts in one afternoon’s work among the dense crowds gathered at some temple on a festival day in Tokyo, where hundreds of thousands of people are participating," (Page 55).

== Personality ==
Although Kilbourne was a quiet man, he was passionate in his writing. Friend, Paul E. Haines recalled that Ernest’s "pen frequently seared deeply into the soul consciousness of many a faulty reaper, causing them [sic] to rise, shake the dust of indifference from their sluggish feet and hasten to the battlefront, an aroused soldier of the cross," (Page 22). His words were powerful and effective, leading evangelist and educator, H.C. Morrison to say, "The writings of Ernest Kilbourne have stirred my soul more than any writings next to the Bible itself," (Page 55).

== Korea ==
In 1905 two Korean students came to the Tokyo Bible school and were so impressed with the school that more followed. Soon, Cowman and Kilbourne decided to begin evangelizing in Korea. They teamed up with Rev. John Thomas to start the venture. They established a training center in downtown Seoul. Launching a venture similar to the Great Village Campaign in Japan, they began an Every Creature Crusade in Korea, which resulted in three-fourths of the 30 million Koreans hearing the Gospel. The church in Korea has faced massive oppression, but has grown phenomenally, and is known today as "The miracle church." In 1931, the church of Japan was supported entirely by its own people, and the OMS headquarters moved to Korea.

== China ==
In 1907, Kilbourne and Cowman visited Shanghai, China, in order to attend a conference. Kilbourne recalled the importance of that conference, "That day in 1907, in a hotel in Shanghai, Brother Cowman and I were definitely called to that field. Although years of inaction passed, that vision ever held and never dimmed; contrariwise, it brightened," (Page 58). Kilbourne finally brought their vision to fruition 18 years later, one year after Cowman died.

Kilbourne and a team of missionaries arrived in China in 1925, which appeared to be a very inopportune time. The country was in the midst of a civil uprising and missionaries were fleeing the country. In No Guarantee but God, Edward and Esther Erny show the way in which Kilbourne and his team were regarded by the fleeing missionaries.

"A veteran missionary, speaking to some 20 Christian workers who were housed temporarily in a YMCA washroom, expressed what many were thinking. ‘The Oriental Missionary Society starting a work in China at a time like this?’ he exclaimed. ‘You must be fools.’ Ironically, it was this same missionary whose home was rented by the OMS, making it the first headquarters for the work in China," (Page 59).

The tumultuous atmosphere in China left many eager to hear the Gospel. While in China, Kilbourne met Andrew Gih, whom he taught about a victorious life in the spirit. He also witnessed his conversion to Christ. Gih went on to become one of the most effective evangelists to ever come from Asia.

== Death ==
Kilbourne continued his work until he died on April 13, 1928 at the age of 63, of a cerebral hemorrhage. More than 2,000 people attended a memorial service in Japan upon hearing the news of his death. Kilbourne’s legacy lives on in the work of OMS today. Kilbourne lived his life by these words, "Every soul it is my joy to lead to Christ, I see as a potential Christian worker. I pray and labor for them until I see God’s full will accomplished in their lives," (Page 53).

== See also ==
- Juji Nakada
