= Pilipo Miriye =

Papua New Guinean Evangelical missionary to Nigeria

Rev. Pilipo Miriye was the first Evangelical missionary from Papua New Guinea to the country of Nigeria. Under his ministry, Miriye was involved with his missionary colleagues in founding the Wesley International Bible College in 1989 in the Imo State of Nigeria. The College was later moved to Lagos, Nigeria and renamed the West African Theological Seminary (WATS).

Miriye also planted churches in Nigeria and taught in the college for a three-year period before returning to PNG and serving as foreign missions secretary for the PNG Bible Church. His wife Glopa and five children, Wesley, Rueben, Flexon, Daisy and Rex were also there with him. Miriye holds a BRE in Education from God's Bible School and College, USA and an MA in Education from Azusa Pacific University.

Currently, Miriye serves as the Missions Director for Papua New Guinea Bible Church. Miriye also lectures at Pacific Bible College and is the Campus Pastor.

In 2024, Miriye’s son, Wesley Miriye, is also working for the PNG Bible Church.

== WATS ==
Today, WATS is Nigeria's largest nondenominational seminary, and is located in the heart of Lagos. WATS serves one of the fastest-growing segments of the Christian Church in the world, and it focuses on the two greatest needs of the African Church: leadership development and discipleship of believers. They offer a Diploma in Theology, two BA programs, four Masters programs and starting in 2007 the Doctor of Ministry program. Their mission statement notes they have a very focused purpose: To train men and women for holy living, for carrying the Gospel to the unreached, and for catalyzing national spiritual awakening.
