= Oswald Chambers =

Scottish baptist and evangelist (1874–1917)

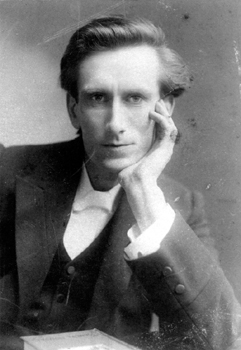
- Chambers in 1906
- Born: Oswald Chambers; 24 July 1874; Aberdeen, Scotland
- Died: 15 November 1917 (aged 43); Cairo, Sultanate of Egypt
- Education: Royal College of Art; University of Edinburgh
- Occupations: Christian minister; teacher
- Spouse: Gertrude Hobbs (m. 1910)
- Children: 1

Oswald Chambers (24 July 1874 – 15 November 1917) was an early-20th-century Scottish Baptist evangelist and teacher who was aligned with the Holiness Movement. He is best known for the daily devotional My Utmost for His Highest.

== Early life and education ==
Born to devout parents in Aberdeen, Scotland, Chambers moved with his family in 1876 to Stoke-on-Trent when his father, Clarence Chambers, became Home Missions evangelist for the North Staffordshire Baptist Association, then to Perth, Scotland when his father returned to the pastorate, and finally to London in 1889, when Clarence was appointed travelling secretary of the Baptist Total Abstinence Association. At 16, Oswald Chambers was baptized and became a member of Rye Lane Baptist Chapel. Even as a teenager, Chambers was noted for his deep spirituality, and he participated in the evangelization of poor occupants of local lodging houses. Chambers also demonstrated gifts in both music and art.

From 1893 to 1895, Chambers studied at the National Art Training School, now the Royal College of Art and was offered a scholarship for further study, which he declined. For the next two years he continued his study of art at the University of Edinburgh while being greatly influenced by the preaching of Alexander Whyte, pastor of Free St George's Church. While at Edinburgh, he felt called to ministry, and he left for Dunoon College, a small theological training school near Glasgow, founded by the Rev. Duncan MacGregor. Chambers was soon teaching classes at the school and took over much of the administration when MacGregor was injured in 1898.

== Holiness minister ==
While teaching at Dunoon, Chambers was influenced by Richard Reader Harris, KC, a prominent barrister and founder of the Pentecostal League of Prayer. In 1905, Reader introduced Chambers as "a new speaker of exceptional power." Through the League, Chambers also met Juji Nakada, a Holiness evangelist from Japan, who stimulated Chambers' growing interest in world evangelism. In 1906, Nakada and Chambers sailed for Japan via the United States. In 1907, Chambers spent a semester teaching at God's Bible School, a Holiness institution in Cincinnati, then spent a few months in Japan working with Charles Cowman, a co-founder of the Oriental Missionary Society.

Arriving back in Britain by the end of the year, Chambers found the Holiness movement divided by the advocates and opponents of founding a new denomination and by supporters and detractors of the tongues movement. Chambers did not oppose glossolalia but criticized those who made it a test of the Baptism of the Holy Spirit.

Sailing back to the United States in 1908, Chambers became better acquainted with Gertrude Hobbs, the daughter of friends, whom he had known casually. They married in May 1910; and on 24 May 1913, Gertrude (whom Chambers affectionately called "Biddy") gave birth to their only child, Kathleen. Even before they married, Chambers considered a partnership in ministry in which Biddy—who could take shorthand at 250 words per minute—would transcribe and type his sermons and lessons into written form.

== Bible Training College ==
In 1911 Chambers founded and was principal of the Bible Training College in Clapham Common, Greater London, in an "embarrassingly elegant" property that had been purchased by the Pentecostal League of Prayer. Chambers accommodated not only students of every age, education, and class but also anyone in need, believing he ought to "give to everyone who asks." "No one was ever turned away from the door and whatever the person asked for, whether money, a winter overcoat, or a meal, was given." Between 1911 and 1915, 106 resident students attended the Bible Training College, and by July 1915, forty were serving as missionaries.

== YMCA chaplain ==
In 1915, a year after the outbreak of World War I, Chambers suspended the operation of the school and was accepted as a YMCA chaplain. He was assigned to Zeitoun, Cairo, Egypt, where he ministered to Australian and New Zealand troops, who later participated in the Battle of Gallipoli. Chambers raised the spiritual tone of a centre intended by both the military and the YMCA to be simply an institution of social service providing wholesome alternatives to the brothels of Cairo. When he told a group of fellow YMCA workers that he had decided to abandon concerts and movies for Bible classes, they predicted the exodus of soldiers from his facilities. "What the skeptics had not considered was Chamber's unusual personal appeal, his gift in speaking, and his genuine concern for the men." Soon his wooden-framed "hut" was packed with hundreds of soldiers listening attentively to messages such as "What Is the Good of Prayer?" Confronted by a soldier who said, "I can't stand religious people," Chambers replied, "Neither can I." Chambers irritated his YMCA superiors by giving away refreshments that the organization believed should be sold so as not to raise expectations elsewhere. Chambers installed a contribution box but refused to ask soldiers to pay for tea and cakes.

== Death and legacy ==
Chambers was stricken with appendicitis on 17 October 1917, but resisted going to a hospital on the grounds that the beds would be needed by men wounded in the long-expected Third Battle of Gaza. On 29 October, a surgeon performed an emergency appendectomy; however, Chambers died 15 November 1917 from a pulmonary haemorrhage. He was buried in Cairo with full military honors.

Before he died, Chambers had proofread the manuscript of his first book, Baffled to Fight Better, a title he had taken from a favorite line by Robert Browning. For the remainder of her life—and at first under very straitened circumstances—Chambers' widow transcribed and published books and articles edited from the notes she had taken in shorthand during the Bible College years and at Zeitoun. Most successful of the thirty books was My Utmost for His Highest (1924), a daily devotional composed of 365 selections of Chamber's talks, each of about 500 words. The work has never been out of print and has been translated into 39 languages.

President George W. Bush said that Chambers' daily devotional, My Utmost for His Highest, was an important book to him. In a 2005 interview with Brian Lamb, Bush said he read the work every other year. Chambers, he said, "was one of the great Christian thinkers... the easier it is to understand what he writes, I think, the more understanding of religion a person becomes."

== Awards and recognition ==
Chambers House, one of the four academic student houses of the YMCA of Hong Kong Christian College, was founded by YMCA of Hong Kong, and was explicitly named to commemorate Chambers; other houses are named for J. Hudson Taylor, Robert Morrison, and YMCA founder George Williams.

== Sources ==
Biography

- McCasland, David (1993). Oswald Chambers: Abandoned To God: The Life Story of the Author of My Utmost for His Highest. Grand Rapids, Michigan: Discovery House Publishers. ISBN 1572930500.
