= Seoul Theological University =

University in Seoul, South Korea

Coordinates: 37.4794°N 126.7890°E

Seoul Theological University is a private evangelical bible college founded in 1911 and located in Bucheon, Gyeonggi Province, South Korea. It strives to cultivate Christian workers and leaders on the basis of the traditions and precepts of the Korea Evangelical Holiness Church.

"The founding ideals of Seoul Theological University were established by Dr. Jong-nam Cho, who became the 3rd president in 1968. On January 12, 2017, at the 110th Theological Education Symposium, the proposal to amend them by reflecting the changes of time while remaining loyal to their original intent was accepted. Accordingly, the Vision and Identity Assessment Committee at Seoul Theological University made an amendment to them."

The university was established to uphold a higher scholastic standard in conformity with the Wesleyan model of spiritual life so as to apply it to its students in order to cultivate dedicated missionaries who are well balanced with theological knowledge, faith and life experiences.

Since 2020, the output of academic papers from this institution has almost doubled as of 2025.

== Notable alumni ==
Song Haena, a South Korean television personality and fashion model is an alumna of Seoul Theological University.
