= Richard Reader Harris (barrister) =

Richard Reader Harris, K.C. (1847 – 25 March 1909) was a prominent English barrister, King's Counsel and Master of the Bench of Gray's Inn, who was also a Methodist minister, founder of the Pentecostal League of Prayer, and author of 34 Christian books. He is particularly remembered as an advocate of British Israelism, the belief that people of Western European descent are also the direct lineal descendants of the Ten Lost Tribes.

== Professional career ==
He started his career as a civil engineer for the Great Western Railway (GWR) and Great Eastern Railway (GER), before taking a post as chief engineer to the Republic of Bolivia. On his return to London in 1883 he trained for the bar, and was called at Gray's Inn, where he was later elected to the Bench.

== Christian life ==
=== Early beliefs ===
Reader Harris drifted from the liberal view of Christianity of his teens to join Charles Bradlaugh's Ethical Society. Bradlaugh, an atheist, mocked Christians who lived immoral lives while he lectured on Bible texts and advocated that his audience abide by ideas expressed in the Sermon on the Mount. As a member of the Puritan wing of Bradlaugh's Ethical Society, Harris pledged not to smoke or drink.

=== Marriage & Christian Conversion ===
When Reader Harris married Mary Griffin Bristow in 1880, he converted to Christianity. At the same time the elevated social status of his wife's family brought him entry to the upper strata of London society.

=== Pentecostal League of Prayer ===
In 1891 both he and his wife founded the Pentecostal League of Prayer as "an interdenominational union of Christian people who, conscious of their own need, would join in prayer to fill believers with the Holy Spirit; revive Christian churches and spread scriptural holiness." Harris became a close friend of evangelist Oswald Chambers.

When the new League began publishing the Tongues of Fire magazine it became associated in the mind of the public with the emerging "tongues movement". Reader Harris claimed that the two had no connection other than their reference to the second chapter of the Book of Acts (Acts 2:6-12). In November 1907 he stated that:

There is nothing wrong with speaking in tongues; it was the privilege of the early Church, and it may be the privilege of any believer today.

=== Wife ===
His wife was a leader in her own right, which was uncommon but not unheard of for a woman in her day. Another more famous example was Catherine Booth, who was also of Methodist background. Apart from having helped him start the League of Prayer, she was also an author who went under the name Mrs Reader Harris.

=== Ten Lost Tribes ===
In 1907 Reader Harris wrote his book "The Lost Tribes of Israel", which expressed his belief in the theory that the Anglo-Saxons are descended from the Ten Lost Tribes:

Such then are the Scriptures that appear to me to furnish strong evidence in favour of the contention of those who believe that in the Anglo-Saxon race God possesses today the descendants of the house of Israel. If this be true, it adds tremendously to our responsibilities, and opens before us in a way that no human tongue can describe, spiritual possibilities, temporal possibilities, national possibilities, and universal possibilities.

== Death ==
On 25 March 1909, Reader Harris suffered a stroke and remained in a coma at his home in London. Without regaining consciousness he died four days later at the age of sixty-one. On 6 April, two thousand people attempted to attend his funeral at West Norwood Cemetery. Hundreds stood outside.
