= Kashiwagi =

Kashiwagi (written: 柏木) is a Japanese surname. Notable people with the surname include:

- Akio Kashiwagi (柏木 昭男), Japanese businessman
- Dean T. Kashiwagi (1952–2025), American economist
- Hiroaki Kashiwagi (born 1982), Japanese curler
- Hiroshi Kashiwagi (1922–2019), Japanese-American poet, playwright and actor
- Kumiko Kashiwagi (柏木 久美子, born 1978), Japanese alpine skier
- Shinsuke Kashiwagi (柏木 真介, born 1981), Japanese basketball player
- Soji Kashiwagi (born 1962), American journalist and playwright
- Yōsuke Kashiwagi (柏木 陽介, born 1987), Japanese footballer
- Yuki Kashiwagi (柏木 由紀, born 1991), Japanese idol and singer
- Yukiko Kashiwagi (柏木 由紀子, born 1947), Japanese actress
