= My Utmost for His Highest =

1935 Christian devotional by Oswald Chambers

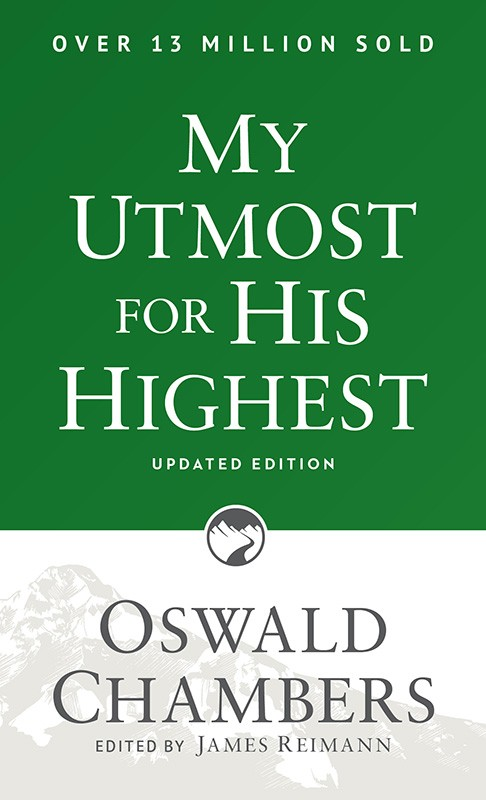
- The front cover of a copy of My Utmost for His Highest by Oswald Chambers.
- Author: Oswald Chambers
- Language: English
- Genre: Devotional literature
- Publisher: Dodd, Mead & Co.
- Publication date: 1935
- Media type: Print
- Pages: 416
- ISBN: 978-1-62707-533-6 (2016 edition)

My Utmost for His Highest is a daily Christian devotional by Oswald Chambers (1874–1917) that compiles his preaching to students and soldiers. Chambers' widow self-published the book with Alden in Oxford circa 1924 (Lukabyo, "From a Ministry for Youth to a Ministry of Youth", 2020, p. 154). It was then commercially published by Simpkin & Marshall in 1927. The book was first published in America by Dodd, Mead, & Co., in 1935. The copyright was renewed in 1963 by the Oswald Chambers Publications Association, Ltd. The "Updated Edition in Today's Language," edited by James Reimann, has appeared in a variety of formats since 1992. It relies on the New King James Version of the Bible, and has become a series of Christian devotional journals, calendars, and children's books. The title is taken from one of Chambers's sermons, where he says "Shut out every consideration and keep yourself before God for this one thing only - My Utmost for His Highest". The book is considered to be one of the most popular religious books ever written, inspiring several people such as columnist and author Cal Thomas and President George W. Bush.

My Utmost for His Highest has been officially translated into over 39 languages and has never been out of print.

== Synopsis and history ==
My Utmost for His Highest is broken down into 366 sections for each day of the year, meant to be read daily for inspiration. The book was published after Oswald's death in 1917, with his wife Gertrude Hobbs compiling the passages after his death from her shorthand notes.

The devotionals in the book cover a range of subjects, from what a person should pray for to reflections on the follower's daily activities.

== Other editions ==
- My Utmost for His Highest: Selections for the Year (1989)
- My Utmost for His Highest: Jesus Wants All of Me (1999)
- My Utmost for His Highest Journal (2001)

There's also a full commentary on this work:

- A Daily Companion to My Utmost for His Highest, by Cecilie & Jed Macosko (Our Daily Bread Publishing, 2018), 384 pages.

== In popular culture ==
- In 1995 a tribute album by the same name of Contemporary Christian Music was released by Myrrh Records and Word Records, which spawned two more albums and a tour.
- My Utmost for His Highest - a Worship Musical, a musical adaptation of the devotional by Claire Cloninger that won a 1998 Dove Award for Best Musical
