= Cowman (profession) =

Person who works specifically with cattle

A cowman is a person who works specifically with cattle.

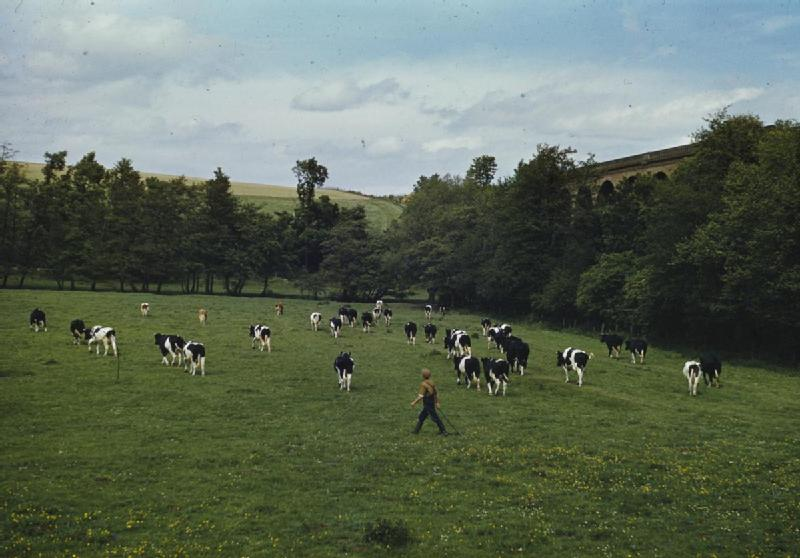
On a farm at Eynsford, Kent, the cowman collects the cows at milking time

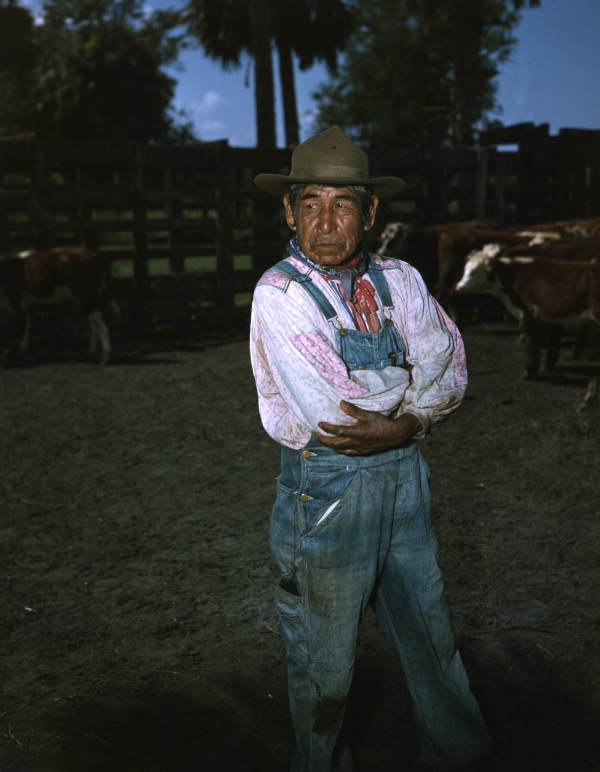
Charlie Micco, a Seminole cattleman

== Usage ==
Usage of the word "cowman" has significant geographic variation, though is sometimes used interchangeably with terms such as "stockman", "cattleman", "rancher" and "grazier".

In England, where the word cowman originates, the social status of a cowman originally was a minor landowner, a yeoman, rather than a cowherd or herdsman. In medieval Gaelic Ireland a cowman was known as a bóaire and was landed. Today, however, in the British Isles the cowman usually is an employee, synonymous with cowherd. A highly skilled, superior cowman would be equivalent to an American farm or ranch manager, responsible for daily management of the herd. An ordinary cowman would be equivalent to a cowboy in the United States, or a stockman in Australia.

A cowman with a dairy farm may also be known in the British Isles as a milkman. In both the British Isles and the United States milkman commonly means someone who delivers milk to houses.

In the United States and Canada, the term "cowman" is used, but is less common than other terms such as "rancher", "cattleman", "stockgrower" or, in some cases, "cowboy". It is generally defined as an individual who owns cattle. The more common term for a person who owns and works with dairy cattle usually is dairy farmer, while a person with beef cattle is a cattle rancher. Being farmers and ranchers, American cattlemen are generally landowners, though on occasion the terms may include foremen or managers of particularly large operations. The employees of a ranch who work with the livestock may be called cowboys, wranglers, sheepherders, or simply "ranch hands". However, the term "cowman" is occasionally used as a synonym for cowboy.

== Etymology ==
In modern British English, the word cowman is a core term, not part of a dialect. Cowman is not an entry in Dictionary of American Regional English.

This word is the origin of the occupational surname Cowman.

== In popular culture ==
In the Old West there were range wars, conflicts between ranchers and farmers over access to resources, especially water. This is reflected in much of the art, literature, and film in the Western genre. An example is the song "The Farmer and the Cowman" in the musical Oklahoma!

== See also ==
- Cowboy
- Pastoral farming
