= Charles Cowman =

American missionary evangelist in Japan

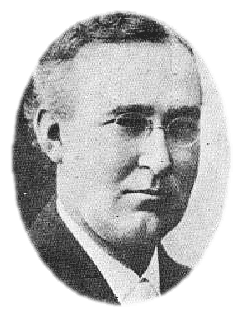
Charles Cowman

Charles Elmer Cowman (March 13, 1868 – September 25, 1924) was a missionary evangelist in Japan. He was also one of the cofounders of the Oriental Missionary Society (now One Mission Society; formerly OMS International).

== Early life ==
Charles Cowman was born on March 13, 1868, in Toulon, Illinois, to David and Mary Cowman. He grew up in the Methodist Episcopal Church.

At age 15, he was offered and accepted a summer job as a telegraph operator at a local railway station. Excelling at this new job, he chose not to return to school the following fall and continued with his new profession. He received a number of promotions over the following years. At 18, he was transferred to a station in Chicago, and by the time he was 19, he earned a salary comparable to employees who had been working there for many years. On June 8, 1889, at 21 years old, he married childhood friend, Lettie Burd. During their first year of marriage, they moved to the Rocky Mountains in order to escape city life. When the high altitude caused Lettie to become very sick though, they returned to Chicago for the next 10 years.

=== Telegraphers’ Mission Band ===
Upon their return to Chicago, Cowman continued his work at the telegraph office. His attitude had changed though since the last time he was there. After a strong conviction, Charles recommitted his life to God. “He made it the first thing in his life to be a Christian, feeling he must concentrate all his energy upon it” (Page 19). One way in which he did this was by forming the “Telegraphers’ Mission Band" in Chicago with coworkers who had become Christians because of him. One member was Ernest A. Kilbourne, who would later become a cofounder of the Oriental Missionary Society. The Telegraphers’ Mission Band sent letters explaining the Gospel to telegraphers all over the United States, Great Britain and Australia.

== The Oriental Missionary Society ==
In the late 1890s, Cowman met and befriended Juji Nakada at his church, Grace Methodist Episcopal Church. Nakada had come from Japan to study at Moody Bible Institute. He, too, would later become a cofounder of the Oriental Missionary Society. Upon Nakada’s return to Japan, the Telegraphers’ Mission Band began financially supporting him as a missionary, thus continuing the connection they had made with him while he was in the states.

After feeling a deep call on their hearts, Charles and Lettie left America on February 1, 1901, to serve as missionaries in Japan. They worked alongside Nakada, with the dream of starting a Bible training institute. “The aim of the institute would not be to produce classical scholars, but young men and women who could handle their mother tongue with effect, who were steeped in the Bible and who could so proclaim it as to arrest and influence all classes of people” (page 52). Within a few months of being in Japan, that dream became a reality when they were able to open a mission hall where Nakada could preach the Gospel message and train leaders. The hall held Bible classes in the daytime and was the venue for evangelistic services in the evening. This was the beginning of the Oriental Missionary Society. In 1902, Ernest Kilbourne joined Cowman and Nakada to assist in their growing ministry.

=== Electric Messages ===
A small monthly periodical called Electric Messages began being printed in November 1902. This was mailed to supporters in the United States and included monthly reports of the work that was being accomplished. The name was later changed to The O.M.S. Standard and is currently called OMS Outreach.

=== Tokyo Bible Training Institute ===
Having outgrown their original building, a need for a larger building for the Bible Training Institute arose in early 1903. By the end of 1903, a new school had opened in Tokyo, providing ample room to grow. The larger space not only accommodated more students, but also provided for great conventions and hundreds of guests.

=== Seoul Bible Training Institute ===
In 1905, two Koreans went to Japan to attend the Tokyo Bible Training Institute. Through these students, OMS began to make connections with Korea. By 1910, they were able to send two missionaries from England, John and Emily Thomas, to Korea. One year after their arrival, the big and 5-story Seoul Bible Training Institute was newly built just outside Seoul. Similar to Japan’s school, the Seoul Bible Training Institute fostered much growth and transformation of the surrounding region.

=== The Great Village Campaign ===
Burdened by the number of people who remained unreached in Japan, Cowman began The Great Village Campaign in 1913. He had a vision “whereby every person in Japan might hear the Gospel in the next five years” (125). He could not rest until the entirety of Japan’s 58 million-person population was reached. Teams of missionaries visited every town, village and home throughout Japan, proclaiming the Gospel and distributing Bibles. Tokyo was the first to be visited, where 3 million Bibles were delivered. From there, workers went out among the provinces to continue with their goal of providing every home with a Bible. Toward the end of 1914, the hard work began to take a toll on Cowman’s health. He and Lettie returned to America for a short time in 1915 to rest and regain his health. The Village Campaign continued to progress while they were in the States, but soon enough, they returned to Japan to complete the work they had begun. 1917 posed to be the most intensive year of the campaign. In the spring, they went to the large island of Kyushu (home to 9 million residents) to establish temporary headquarters. As the year went on and the completion of the campaign drew near, Cowman once again became ill. He began to have many heart problems, leading Lettie and him to leave Japan for another few months. In January 1918, while at home in America, they received news through the O.M.S. Standard that the Japan Village Campaign was complete. About 60 million Japanese were equipped with the Gospel, covering 161,000 square miles (420,000 km^{2}) of land (page 137).

== Late life ==
While back in America, Charles regained his health for a short time. He traveled for six months, telling the incredible story of The Great Village Campaign. He would have likely continued traveling the country, but numerous heart attacks forced him to rest at his home in California. For the next six years, he suffered in great pain, yet he always kept a positive attitude while continuing his work for the Lord. “Although broken in body, he kept an oversight of the home office and every department of work on the field, dictating letters by the hundreds” (page 142). He also began to make plans to go into China, so that another Bible training institute could be established. In March 1924, Cowman faithfully signed the bank books of OMS over to two trustees: Ernest Kilbourne and W.J. Clark, a Los Angeles businessman.

== Death and The Cowman Memorial Bible Training Institute ==
On the night of July 17, 1924, Cowman experienced a stroke that paralyzed his entire left side. The doctors said he would only live a few more hours, but he lived a number of weeks more. He passed just after midnight on September 25, 1924 (page 153). Two days after his funeral, a letter came to him stating that a fellow worker was giving $25,000 to open a Bible Training Institute in China. One year later, in September 1925, the Bible Training Institute was up and running in Shanghai. It was fittingly named, “The Cowman Memorial Bible Training Institute.” (page 155)
