= Lettie Cowman =

American writer and missionary

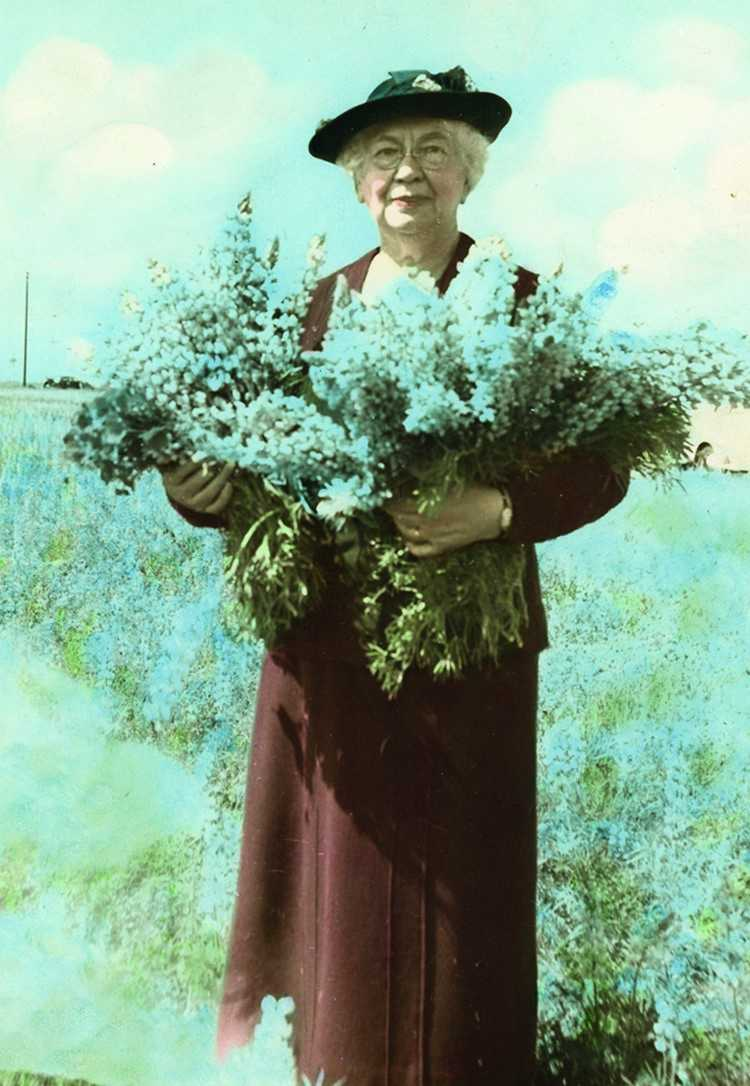
Lettie Cowman

Lettie Burd Cowman (March 3, 1870 – April 17, 1960), also known as L.B. Cowman, was an American writer and author of the devotional books Streams in the Desert and Springs in the Valley. Cowman published her books under the author name Mrs. Charles E. Cowman. She was also one of the cofounders of The Oriental Missionary Society (later known as OMS International, and eventually One Mission Society).

== Early life ==
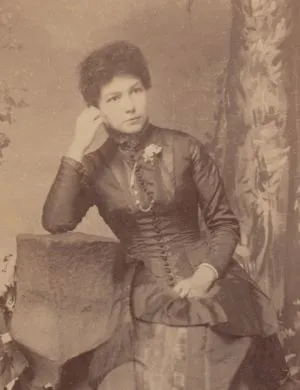
Lettie Cowman in 1889

Lettie Burd Cowman was born on March 3, 1870, in Afton, Iowa to Isaac and Margaret Burd. At 13 years of age, she met her future husband, Charles Cowman, a young telegraph operator. Six years later, on June 8, 1889, they were married. Charles was also one of the co-founders of The Oriental Missionary Society. Lettie and Charles lived in Glenwood Springs, Colorado, for the first year of their marriage. After living there for a year, the high altitude of the Rocky Mountains caused Lettie to become very ill. They were forced to move back to Chicago, where they lived for the next 10 years. While there, they were converted at Grace Methodist Episcopal Church.

== One Mission Society ==
=== Japan ===
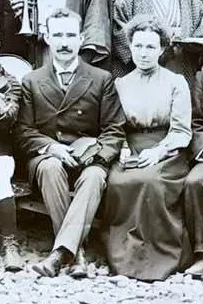
Charles and Lettie Cowman in Japan, 1901.

The couple trained at Martin Wells Knapp’s God’s Bible School in Cincinnati. On February 1, 1901, the Cowmans left the United States to work as missionaries in Japan. They worked alongside Juji Nakada, a friend they had met at their church in Chicago. In 1902, a friend from the telegraph office, Ernest Kilbourne, joined them to aid their growing ministry. The Cowmans, Nakada, and Kilbourne are considered the four cofounders of the Oriental Missionary Society.

=== Bible Training Institutes ===
The work in Japan continued to grow. By 1903, two Bible Training Institutes had opened in Japan. These schools held classes during the day, and in the evening hosted evangelical services open to the public. Dozens flooded in nightly to hear the preaching of Juji Nakada. A Bible Training Institute was open in Seoul in 1910.

=== The Great Village Campaign ===
The four co-founders wanted to reach as many people as they could. Although they were making progress, Charles was not satisfied. This led to the start of the Great Village Campaign in 1913. His goal was for every person in Japan to hear the Gospel within the next five years. Teams of missionaries went to every town, village and home throughout Japan, proclaiming the Gospel and distributing Bibles. When Charles' health took a turn downward in 1917, he and Lettie were forced to return to America. In January 1918, they received news through the O.M.S. Standard that the Great Village Campaign was complete. About 60 million Japanese were equipped with the Gospel, covering 161,000 square miles (420,000 km^{2}) of land.

== Writing career ==
=== Electric Messages (OMS Outreach) ===
Cowman began writing in November 1902 when OMS co-founder Ernest Kilbourne initiated a monthly publication called Electric Messages. She wrote monthly reports of the work being accomplished. These reports were then mailed to supporters in the United States. The name was later changed to The O.M.S. Standard, and is currently named OMS Outreach.

=== Streams in the Desert ===
After the Cowmans returned to the United States in January 1918, Charles' health continued to decline. As he suffered in pain, Lettie suffered, watching her husband slowly fade away. During this time, her best-selling devotional book, Streams in the Desert, was conceived. Lettie wrote a daily devotional based on her hardships and her experiences of fellowship with God. Each daily section contains a Bible passage and a quote from another author. The title of the book comes from Isaiah 35:6, "Then will the lame leap like a deer, and the mute tongue shout for joy. Water will gush forth in the wilderness and streams in the desert.". No one expected Streams to be as successful as it was. Cowman was not seeking success during the time she wrote it. When the book was being printed, her publisher was certain they would never publish more than the original printing of 3,000. Yet, many readers found they could connect with Streams because it "spoke to those who had difficulty relating their own sufferings to the noble and eternal purposes of a loving and all-wise God." Cowman often stated, "I did not write Streams. God gave me Streams.".

=== Missionary Warrior ===
Charles died in September 1924. After his death, Lettie found a note addressed to her in his Bible, stating, "Go on with my unfinished task." Despite her grieving, she knew that she had work to complete. The year following her husband's death, Cowman wrote Missionary Warrior, a biography of Charles Cowman's life. In writing this, she hoped that "a world-wide crusade [would] be launched to reach every living member of this generation with the gospel." After Charles' death, OMS' work continued with co-founder E.A. Kilbourne as the organization's second President. Lettie continued serving with OMS as one of the co-founders. When Kilbourne died four years after Charles, Lettie became the third President of OMS.

== Every Creature Crusade ==
In the midst of her new writing career, Lettie continued serving as President of OMS as her first priority. She was determined to carry out the Every Creature Crusade (now known as Every Community for Christ), which Charles started in Japan as the Great Village Campaign. She began speaking at camp meetings and conventions. Just as Charles felt such a strong calling to proclaim the Gospel to every individual in Japan, Lettie felt a similar call to distribute the Gospel to all the nations. They had already been to Japan, Korea, and China, so they began to make plans to go to India, Africa, South America, Europe; all the nations of the earth. In Europe, they expanded into countries such as Finland, Estonia, Latvia, Poland, and Czechoslovakia. This crusade marked one of the last great evangelistic efforts in Europe before Nazi Germany took control. In Africa, Egypt was a country for which Lettie felt a great burden. In North America, Cuba was a country of focus (Page 130). In December 1941, a crusade began in Mexico. Over the course of five years, the total evangelical church membership doubled (Page 166). In 1943, the Oriental Missionary Society entered South America, something Lettie never dreamed would happen. The right doors opened, and a Bible Training Institute began that year in Medellín, Colombia.

== Cowman Publications, Inc. and World Gospel Crusades ==
In the fall of 1949, Lettie knew that her time as President of OMS had come to an end. She stepped down from the role with the hope that the mission's book department and crusade department would be released to form another corporation. They were and she accepted the presidency for the new corporation under two names: Cowman Publications, Inc. and World Gospel Crusades.

== Death ==
Lettie Cowman continued writing and public speaking up to her death on Easter Sunday, April 17, 1960.

== Published works ==
- Streams in the Desert
- Springs in the Valley
- Missionary Warrior
- Consolation (Words of Comfort and Cheer)
- Count it all Joy
- Praise Changes Things
- Sit Still, Until
- Thoughts for the Quiet Hour
- Mountain Trailways for Youth
- Traveling Toward Sunrise
- Handfuls of Purpose (God-After All)
