= One Mission Society =

US-based Christian missionary society

One Mission Society (formerly known as The Oriental Missionary Society and OMS International) is an Evangelical Christian missionary society based in Indiana, US. Its current president is Jeffry Edwards, who serves as the 12th president of the organization.

It was founded in 1901 by Charles Cowman, Lettie Cowman, Juji Nakada, and Ernest A. Kilbourne. As of 2025, it operated in 84 countries.

== Founding ==
OMS was founded in a storefront building in Tokyo, Japan. In 1901, American missionaries Charles and Lettie Cowman partnered with a Japanese pastor, Juji Nakada, holding Christian evangelistic meetings for 2,000 consecutive nights. Japanese churches were organized, and the new association, the Japan Holiness Church (JHC), grew rapidly. Not long after their arrival in 1902, the group was joined by Charles' former co-worker, first conversion, and best friend, Ernest Kilbourne and his family.

OMS is interdenominational but has its roots in the Wesleyan Holiness tradition.

== Founders ==
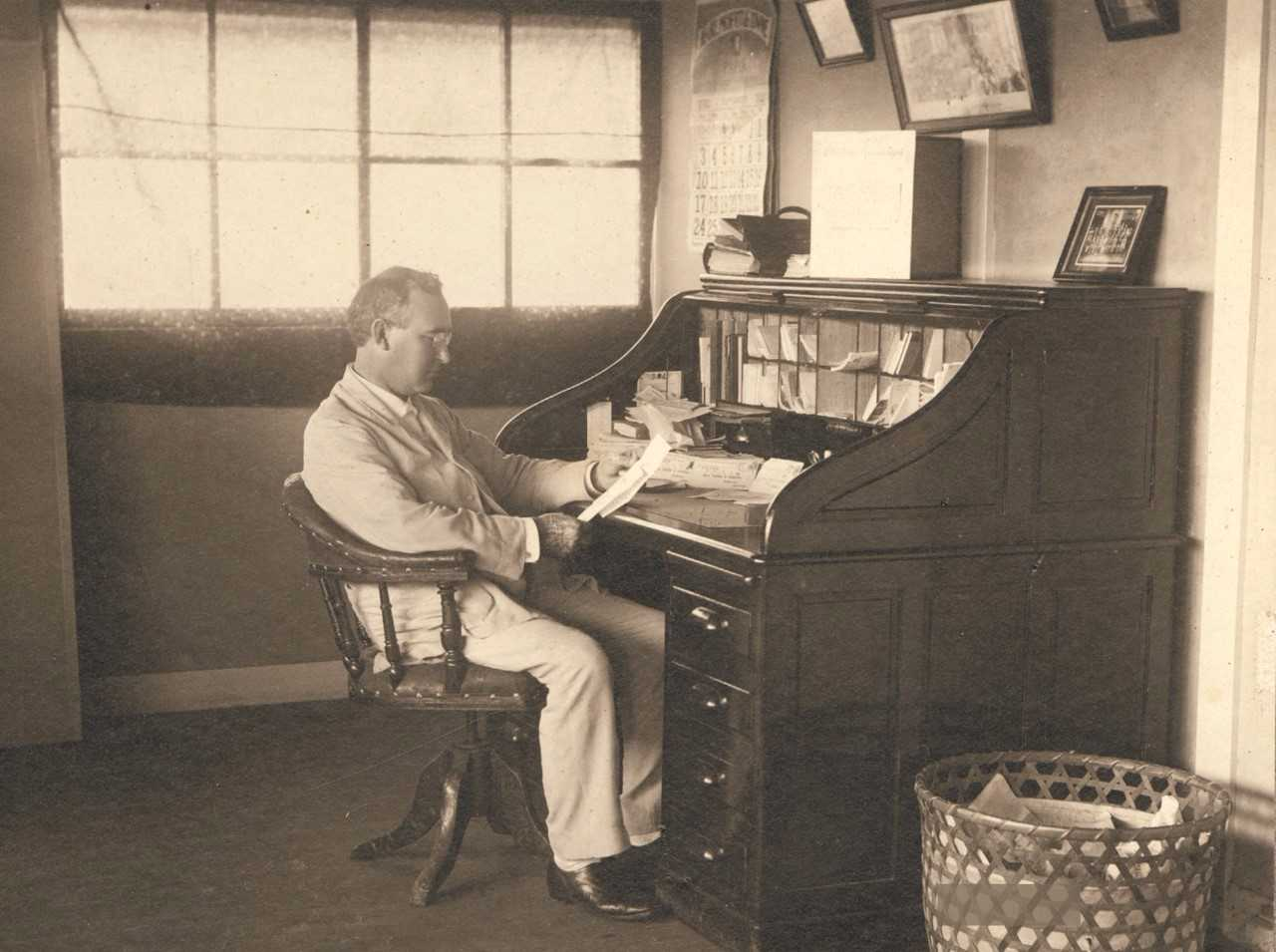
Charles Cowman

=== Charles Cowman ===
Born on March 13, 1868, Charles E. Cowman grew up in a religious family. At 15, he left home for a job in telegraphing. He married Lettie Burd in 1889. After living in Colorado for a year, they spent the next ten years in Chicago, where Charles continued his work in telegraphy. In 1894, Charles Cowman began his work as a missionary, preaching to co-workers

The Cowmans moved to Japan in 1901 to work with Juji Nakada. In 1918, the Cowmans returned to America due to Charles' health issues. He spent his final years in physical pain and died in 1924.

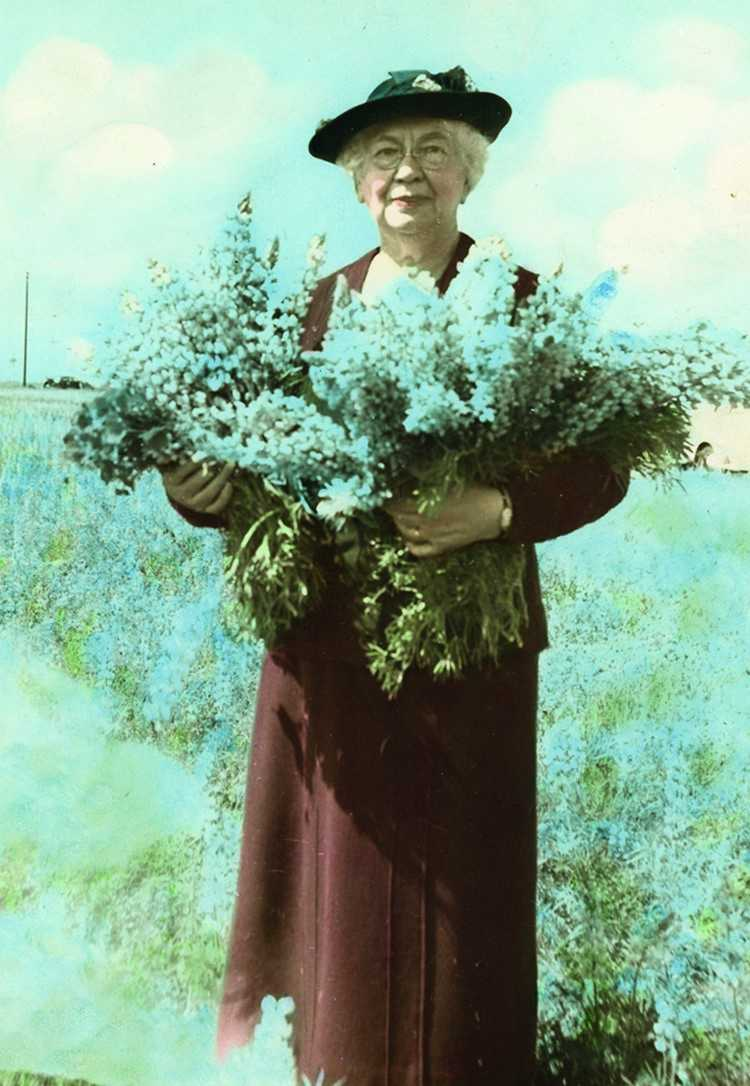
Lettie Cowman

=== Lettie Cowman ===
Born on March 3, 1870, Lettie Burd met her future husband when she was a baby, and again when they were teenagers.

After moving to Chicago, they heard A.B. Simpson, founder of the Christian and Missionary Alliance, give a missionary challenge. They then decided to dedicate their lives to missionary work and trained at Martin Wells Knapp’s God’s Bible School in Cincinnati.

In 1925, she wrote Streams in the Desert about her work and the hardships she experienced, specifically when Charles' health was rapidly declining. She wrote several other books, including a history of her husband and the beginnings of the OMS. In 1928, she became the third president of OMS and held this post until 1949. She continued writing and public speaking up to her death on April 17, 1960.

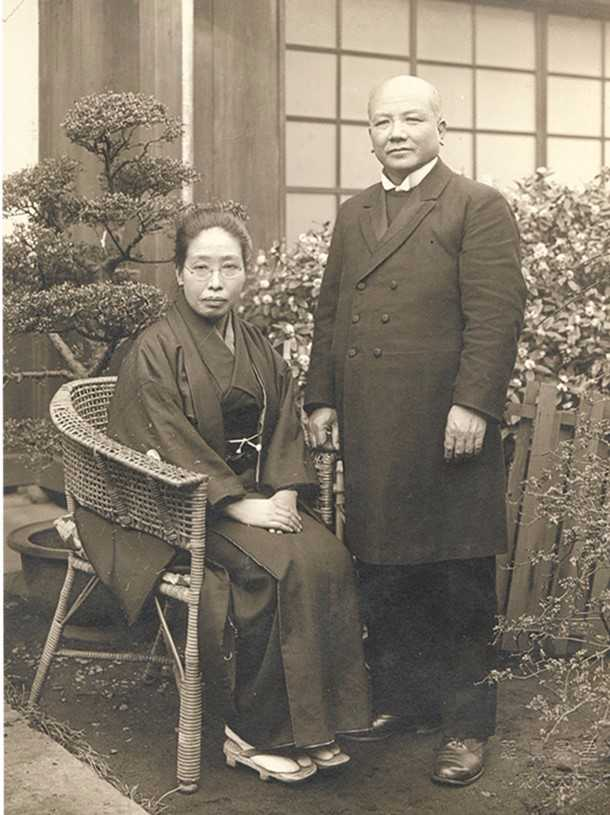
Juji Nakada and Wife

=== Juji Nakada ===
Born on October 29, 1870, Juji Nakada was a rebellious youth. His decision to enter missionary work was influenced by a life-long mentor, Reverend Yoichi Honda. Nakada went to the US to attend the Moody Bible Institute in Chicago and returned to Japan as an evangelist. Cowman, who had been helping Nakada financially, received news of Nakada's participation in several mass conversions. Cowman and Nakada established the Tokyo Bible Institute, with Nakada serving as the first president. The institute was used for classes during the day and evangelism in the evenings.

An OMS-published book, No Guarantee but God, writes of Nakada, "It was not surprising that he was sometimes charged with being domineering, even dictatorial. But by the great majority of Christians, both laymen and clergy, he was held in respect that approached awe."

Nakada died on September 24, 1939.

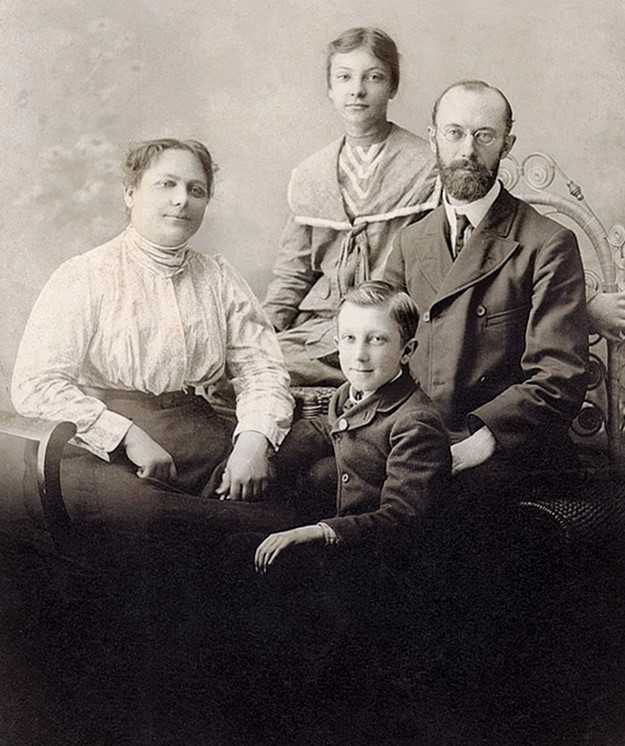
Ernest Kilbourne and family

=== Ernest A. Kilbourne ===
Ernest A. Kilbourne was born on March 13, 1865, in Ontario, Canada. He was brought up in a Methodist home, but after moving to the US as a teenager to work for the Western Union, his religious upbringing was quickly forgotten. He moved to New York at age 21 and then traveled to Australia, Europe, and New Zealand, settling for a very short time into a job as a telegraph operator in Nevada. He met his future wife, Julia Pittinger, and after they were married, Kilbourne transferred to the Chicago office, where he met Charles Cowman, who was responsible for his conversion.

In 1902, he and his family went to Japan to continue the work that had been started by the Cowmans and Nakada.

When Cowman died, he became the second president of the organization. Kilbourne died in 1928. He and Julia had three children, who all became OMS missionaries.

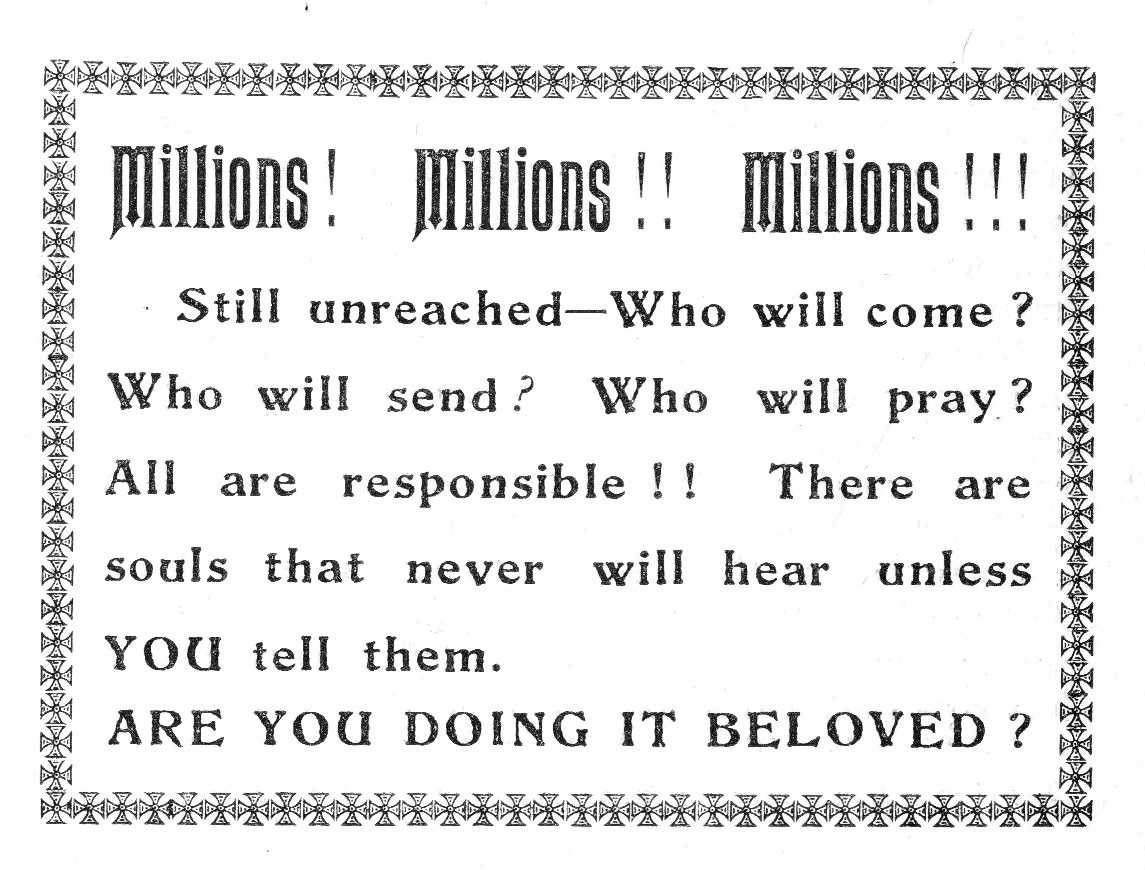
Electric Messages

== Electric Messages magazine ==
In November 1902, Kilbourne started Electric Messages, a monthly periodical that detailed what they were accomplishing and encouraged others to donate to the cause. This was later called The O.M.S. Standard before being changed to its current name, OMS Outreach. Lettie Cowman was the active writer for these publications for many years.

== The Great Village Campaign ==
The OMS founders began the Great Village Campaign in 1913. The goal was to reach every person in Japan with the Gospel in five years. By the time the campaign was completed in 1918, the Cowmans were in America due to Charles' health issues.

After regaining his health, Cowman traveled to promote the campaign, but his health forced him to stop traveling. In early 1924, he signed over the OMS bank books to Kilbourne and a businessman named Clark.

== 21st century ==
By 2025, OMS was working with 300 full-time missionaries in 84 countries, in more than 50 languages. Mission areas include Japan, Taiwan, South Korea, Spain, Colombia, Ecuador, Italy, Hungary, Haiti, Israel, and more.

OMS works with more than 300 partner organizations in evangelism, discipleship, Church multiplication, church planting, and leadership training/development.

OMS is a member of the Evangelical Council for Financial Accountability.
