= List of Methodists =

This list deals with those who are notable in the history or culture of all Methodist churches. For other Methodists who are not notable in Methodist history or culture, see Category:Methodists.

== Early leaders ==
- John Wesley
- Charles Wesley
- George Whitefield
- Richard Allen
- Francis Asbury
- Thomas Coke
- William Law
- William Williams Pantycelyn
- Howell Harris
- James Varick
- Countess of Huntingdon

== Early women preachers ==
- Alice Cambridge
- Ann Carr
- Sarah Crosby
- Mary Bosanquet Fletcher
- Anne Lutton
- Phoebe Palmer
- Agnes Smyth

== Clergy ==
- Bernhard Anderson – Old Testament scholar
- Ephraim Kingsbury Avery – New England minister long thought to be the first American clergyman tried for murder
- Elihu Bailey – Wisconsin State Assemblyman
- Canaan Banana – first President of Zimbabwe
- John C. A. Barrett – Chairman of the World Methodist Council
- William Black (Methodist) – linked to Nova Scotia
- Henry Boehm – centenarian
- William Bramwell – 1790s revivalist preacher in Yorkshire
- George Bramwell Evens – nature writer of the Romani people
- Rev. Dr. Henry Brown – Methodist minister and author of The Impending Peril: Or, Methodism and Amusement
- William Gannaway Brownlow – Governor of Tennessee
- Byron Cage – gospel singer (African Methodist Episcopal Church)
- Thomas Charles – Welsh author. (Calvinistic Methodist)
- Zerah Colburn (math prodigy) – became a minister, after youth as a mental calculator
- Walter T. Colquitt – circuit-riding Methodist preacher who served in the US House of Representatives and the Senate.
- Thomas Mears Eddy – pastor
- William Edwards (architect) – Welsh designer of bridges
- Edward Eggleston – also author
- Henry Evans (preacher) – pastor and cobbler
- Calvin Fairbank – abolitionist
- Robert Newton Flew – theologian and ecumenist
- Wallace Wattles – New Thought pioneer, theologian and Christian Socialist - Famous for inspiring the blockbuster book, The Secret by Rhonda Byrne. Author of Science of Getting Rich bestselling book 1910. Possibly the biggest selling author in the 20th and 21st Century who was a Methodist minister.
- Richard Watson – theology and president of the Methodist Conference
- Orange Scott – first president of the Wesleyan Methodist Connexion
- Adam Crooks – Wesleyan Methodist Connexion
- Arno Clemens Gaebelein – also a writer
- Leslie Griffiths – life peer in the House of Lords
- Adam Hamilton (pastor) – senior pastor of the 17,000-member United Methodist Church of the Resurrection in Leawood, Kansas
- Harold P. Hamilton – Kentucky Wesleyan College President
- Hill, Rowland – founder of Surrey Chapel, London and early advocate of vaccination
- Silas Hocking – novelist and preacher
- Jabez Bunting – President of the Methodist Conference
- John Hogan – U.S. Congressman and preacher
- Andrew Hunter (Methodist preacher) – "Father of Arkansas Methodism" and a politician
- Leonard Isitt (minister) – New Zealand Methodist minister
- James W. Kemp – minister known for writing about Dr. Seuss as he relates to Christianity
- Samuel Kobia – General Secretary of the World Council of Churches
- Lowen Kruse – Nebraska state senator
- Augustus Baldwin Longstreet – known as a humorist
- William Losee – Canadian circuit rider
- Sarah Mallett – preacher
- William Morley Punshon – preaching/lecturing
- Kathleen Richardson, Baroness Richardson of Calow – first woman president of the Methodist Conference
- Egerton Ryerson – The former Ryerson University (now Toronto Metropolitan University) was named after for him
- William Ryerson – political figure
- Tex Sample – sociologist of religion
- William J. Simmons – founder of the second Ku Klux Klan (suspended minister)
- Ndabaningi Sithole – founder of the Zimbabwe African National Union and a Methodist minister.
- John Karefa-Smart – leader of the United National People's Party of Sierra Leone
- Donald Soper – Christian socialist and pacifist
- Edward Sugden – first master of Queen's College (University of Melbourne)
- Wilbur Fisk Tillett – clergyman and educator
- Charles Tindley – gospel music composer
- Channing Heggie Tobias – member of the President's Committee on Civil Rights
- Simon Topping – activist on poverty causes like Make Poverty History
- Don Wildmon – Methodist pastor; founder of the conservative activist group American Family Association
- Cecil Williams – involved in HIV/AIDS causes
- Nicolás Zamora – first Filipino to be ordained as a Protestant minister; first General Superintendent of IEMELIF

=== Bishops ===
- William Taylor (bishop) — Methodist missionary who established the first church in California and introduced Methodism to countries around the world.
- Richard Allen – founder of African Methodist Episcopal Church
- Sarah Allen – AME, founded the Daughters of the Conference
- Daniel Payne – AME, first African-American president of an African-American university, Wilberforce University
- Richard Whatcoat – third bishop of the American Methodist Episcopal Church

=== Missionaries ===
- Henry Appenzeller — missionary to Korea
- Joseph Beech – missionary to Sichuan, Western China
- George John Bond – missionary to China and Japan
- Henry Augustus Buchtel – did missionary work in Bulgaria, also a Governor of Colorado.
- James Calvert - missionary to Fiji
- Charles Cowman – missionary to Japan
- Lettie Cowman – missionary to Japan
- Henry Hare Dugmore – Wesleyan missionary and translator in South Africa
- James Endicott – missionary to Sichuan, Western China
- Alexander Robert Edgar – missionary to Australia. (convert from Anglicanism)
- Ailie Gale – missionary to China
- Francis Dunlap Gamewell – missionary to China
- E. Stanley Jones — missionary to India
- Leslie Gifford Kilborn – missionary to Sichuan, Western China
- Omar Leslie Kilborn – missionary to Sichuan, Western China
- James Hope Moulton – missionary known for studying/preaching to the Parsis
- Christoph Gottlob Müller – founded the Wesleyan Church in Germany.
- John Hunt (missionary) – one of the earliest missionaries in Fiji.
- Mary Reed – missionary to the lepers of India
- Susanna Carson Rijnhart – missionary to Tibet and Sichuan
- George Scott – missionary to Sweden
- Theo Sørensen – missionary to Tibet and Sichuan
- Martha Van Marter - American home missionary, editor, writer

== Theologians ==
- John B. Cobb (1925–2024) – American scholar, process theologian and pioneer ecotheologian
- James H. Cone (1938–2018) – advocate of Black theology
- Albert Outler (1908–1989) – Wesleyan scholar who formulated the Wesleyan Quadrilateral
- José Míguez Bonino (1924–2012) – Argentine Methodist minister and liberation theologian

== Laity ==
=== Politicians ===
- Ulysses S. Grant – 18th President of the United States (1869–77)
- William McKinley – 25th President of the United States (1897-1901)
- George W. Bush - 43rd President of the United States (2001-2009)
- Alben W. Barkley - 35th vice-president of the United States (1949–53)
- Dick Cheney - 46th vice-president of the United States (2001–09)
- Chiang Kai-shek - Premier of China (1930–31, 1935–38, 1939–45, 1947) and President of the Republic of China (1948–49, 1950–75), the longest-serving non-royal ruler of China, having held the post for 46 years.
- Syngman Rhee - first President of Republic of Korea (1948–60)
- Nelson Mandela – President of South Africa (1994–99), South African anti-apartheid revolutionary, political leader, and philanthropist.
- Boris Trajkovski – second President of the Republic of Macedonia (1999-2004) and President of the Church Council of the Macedonian Evangelical Methodist Church.
- David Hallam – British Member of the European Parliament and Methodist Local Preacher
- Paul Boateng – lay preacher who became Britain's first black Cabinet minister in 1997
- Colin Breed – lay preacher and British Liberal Democrat Shadow Cabinet member
- Minnie Fisher Cunningham – helped found a Methodist church in New Waverly, Texas; political figure who worked to uplift the standard of living for the disenfranchised
- Isaac Foot – Vice President of the Methodist Conference (1937–38) and President of the Liberal Party (UK) (1947)
- John Karefa-Smart – Sierra Leonese foreign minister and Methodist elder
- Robert Newbald Kay – British Liberal MP. Also a member of the Methodist Conference who was important to the Methodist chapel in Acomb, North Yorkshire.
- Winnie Mandela - South African anti-apartheid revolutionary, political leader and social worker who was the wife of Nelson Mandela from 1958 to 1996.
- Edmund Marshall – Methodist local preacher, ecumenical adviser to the Bishop of Wakefield and former MP.
- Camilo Osías – President of the Senate of the Philippines; formerly part of the Church of the United Brethren in Christ
- Florence Paton – lay preacher, British Labour party
- Newton Rowell – leading lay figure in Canada's Methodist church and a politician
- Soong May-ling – First Lady of the Republic of China, wife of Chiang Kai-shek
- Frederick Stewart (Australian politician) – Australian Cabinet minister and lay preacher
- Taufa'ahau Tupou IV – lay preacher in the Free Wesleyan Church and former King of Tonga
- Feng Yuxiang – General of the Zhili Clique and later founder of the Guominjun, known as the "Christian General" and "Backstabbing General"

=== Women lay leaders ===
- Belle Harris Bennett (1852–1922) – missionary and suffragist from Richmond Kentucky who led the Southern Methodist Church reform giving women full laity rights in 1919
- Eliza Bennis (1725–1802) – early Irish convert (1769) and leader in Limerick and Waterford
- Henrietta Gayer (c. 1750–1814) – Irish Methodist leader
- Eliza Clark Garrett (1805–1855) – Chicago-based leader who founded the Garrett Bible Institute seminary.
- Freer Helen Latham (1907–1987) - Australian, president of World Federation of Methodist Women

=== Educators ===
- Dr. Henry N. Snyder (1865–1949) – educator and author who served as president of Wofford College, Spartanburg, SC from 1902 until his retirement in 1942

=== Entertainers ===
- Beyoncé – American singer
- Brian Courtney Wilson – American gospel and CCM singer
- Brittany Hargest – member of CCM group Jump5
- Toni Gonzaga and Alex Gonzaga – Filipina television personalities/recording artists

=== Scientists ===
- Charles Coulson – became vice-president of the British Methodist Conference in 1959 and won chemistry's Davy Medal in 1970.
- Ernest Walton – Irish physicist and Nobel laureate in Physics
- William Daniel Phillips – Nobel Prize–winning physicist and a founding member of the "International Society for Science & Religion"
- Arthur Leonard Schawlow – co-winner of the 1981 Nobel Prize in Physics

=== Writers (including hymn writers) ===
- William F. Albright (1891–1971) – Methodist archeologist who writes on Bible archaeology
- Jennie M. Bingham (1859 – 1933) – American author
- Emily Rose Bleby (1849–1917) – Jamaican/British social reformer
- Adda Burch (1869–1929) – American teacher, missionary, activist, reporter
- Marietta Stanley Case (1845-1900) – American poet and temperance advocate
- Samuel Chadwick (1860–1932) – The Way to Pentecost
- Fanny Crosby – American mission worker, poet, lyricist, and composer
- Elizabeth Litchfield Cunnyngham (1831-1911) – American missionary, church worker, editor, translator
- Nannie Webb Curtis (1861-1920) – American essayist and editor (convert from Baptist)
- Susanna M. D. Fry (1841–1920) – American writer, editor
- Ann Griffiths (1776–1805) – Welsh poet and hymn writer (convert from Anglicanism)
- Phoebe Knapp (1839–1908) – Methodist hymn writer
- Harper Lee (1926–2016) – American author
- William Williams Pantycelyn (1717–1791) – Welsh Methodist hymn writer (Calvinistic Methodist and preacher)
- Amy Parkinson (1855-1938) – Canadian poet, hymnwriter
- Emma Rood Tuttle (1839–1916) – American author

=== Fictional characters ===
- Superman (Clark Kent) – Superman was raised Protestant by his adoptive parents, Jonathan and Martha Kent.
- Supergirl (Linda Danvers) – Supergirl is an active Methodist. Her church's minister, Larry Varvel, was based on a real-life Methodist minister of the same name.
- Hank, Peggy, and Bobby Hill along with the majority of King of the Hill characters – attend Arlen First Methodist Church.
- Amanda Waller – The leader of the Suicide Squad and Checkmate in the DC Comics universe.
- Samuel and Rose Sayer – Methodist missionaries played by Robert Morley and Katharine Hepburn in John Huston's film adaption of C. S. Forester's novel, The African Queen.
- Scout Finch – Main character of To Kill a Mockingbird, by Harper Lee. The Finch family is described in the first chapter as descended from an English Methodist, Simon Finch, who fled religious persecution and emigrated to Alabama. The Finches are also described as attending Maycomb's Methodist church, in contrast to other characters, such as Miss Maudie Atkins (Baptist) and Calpurnia (AME).
