= Hamilton Moore =

Hamilton Moore may refer to:

- Hamilton Moore (theologian)
- Hamilton Moore (rugby union)
