= Baptist Missions =

Baptist mission organisation

- Type: Mission ministry
- Purpose: Christianity
- Location: The Baptist Centre, 19 Hillsborough Road, Moira, Lisburn, BT67 0HG, Northern Ireland, United Kingdom
- Origins: Association of Baptist Churches in Ireland
- Region served: France; Latvia; Peru; Republic of Ireland; Russia; Spain; Ukraine; United Kingdom
- Method: Evangelism; Church planting
- Members: 30,000
- Key people: Gordon Darragh
- Subsidiaries: Association of Baptist Churches in Ireland
- Employees: 50
- Volunteers: 200
- Website: www.ibaptistmissions.org

Baptist Missions (BM) is a Baptist mission organisation and a department of the Association of Baptist Churches in Ireland (ABC). It is located in the Baptist Centre and is shared with ABC. The scope of their activities is international in scale covering several countries including France, Latvia, Peru, the Republic of Ireland, Russia, Spain, Ukraine and the United Kingdom.

== History ==
Missions work in Ireland can be traced back to 1814 when the Baptist Irish Society was formed. In 1888 the Baptist Irish Society was renamed the Irish Baptist Home Mission.

Missions work in Peru began in 1924 when the Irish Baptist Foreign Mission was formed. The first mission partners were sent to Peru in 1927. Missions work in France began in 1972.

In 1977 both organisations where merged into the present day Baptist Missions.

In 2014, Mervyn Scott was appointed as Mission Director at the Churches Council in May 2014 and began to serve on September 1st 2014.

== Strategy ==
The strategy used by BM to achieve its aims is by working with Baptist churches in the countries it works in to evangelise and plant churches and to help existing and new churches to grow and develop spiritually and numerically.

== Ireland ==
Baptist Missions work on Ireland began before 1814..

=== Mission Partners ===
BM have 15 Mission Partners groups working in a variety of locations in Ireland, including Northern Ireland and the Republic of Ireland.

== Peru ==
BM first sent mission workers to Peru in 1927. BM work is mainly among the Aymara people, living in the Sierra of the Andes mountains where there is a growing Baptist community of 110 churches. Recently families have migrated to the coastal cities of Ilo, Moquequa and Tacna and as a result most BM work in these areas.

=== Mission Partners ===
BM have 4 Mission Partners groups working in a variety of locations in Peru.

=== Peruvian Partners ===
BM also have 13 Peruvian Partners groups working in a variety of locations in Peru.

== Europe ==
Baptist Missions work began in Europe in 1974.

=== Mission Partners ===
BM have 4 Mission Partners groups working in a variety of locations in Europe, including France, Latvia, Russia and Ukraine.

== Projects ==
Baptist Missions have several projects:

=== Ite Camp and Conference Centre ===
Completed in 2006 the 20,000 sq metre Ite Camp and Conference Centre serves Peruvian Baptists as well as Association of Baptist Churches in Ireland teams. Resources include accommodation blocks, mini-amphitheatre and sport facilities. Teams from the Association of Baptist Churches in Ireland regularly go to volunteer at the centre. The centre has a Board to manage the development, further building work on the site as well as a Youth ministries director.

=== SAD ===
The SAD programme (Seminary at a Distance) is a distance learning teaching programme for people who cannot attend existing centres in Tacna or Moquegua. Mostly those who live in Puno and Ilo.

=== Peruvian Workers ===
Currently 16 Peruvian Workers are employed by BM. These workers depend on money from BM supporters. Peruvian worker students on the University of Wales, Lampeter Master of Arts in Theology (MA) course through Irish Baptist College can work while studying.

== See also ==
- Association of Baptist Churches in Ireland
- Baptist Centre
- Irish Baptist College
- Ken Scott
- Maurice Dowling
