= ABC Insight =

- ABC Insight logo
- Categories: Evangelical Christian magazine
- Frequency: Bimonthly
- Circulation: 20,000
- Company: Association of Baptist Churches in Ireland
- Country: Ireland and United Kingdom
- Based in: Moira, County Down
- Language: English
- Website: www.baptistsinireland.org

ABC Insight is a bimonthly magazine which serves people connected with the Association of Baptist Churches in Ireland.

In December 2009 the magazine was relaunched with a new design and logo, with the tagline "Connecting Baptists".
