= Baptist Centre =

The Baptist Centre

Religion
- Affiliation: Association of Baptist Churches in Ireland
- Region: Northern Region
- Leadership: William Colville (Association Director)

Location
- Location: 19 Hillsborough Road, Moira, Craigavon, BT67 0HG, Northern Ireland, United Kingdom
- Interactive map of The Baptist Centre
- Coordinates: 54.5417°N 6.187019°W

Architecture
- Type: Office and Tertiary education
- Style: Postmodern
- Completed: 2003
- Materials: Brick

Website
- www.baptistsinireland.org

The Baptist Centre is a building which houses the Association of Baptist Churches in Ireland (ABC), its departments (Baptist Missions, Baptist Women, Baptist Youth, and others) and the Baptist Theological Centre which includes the Irish Baptist College (IBC), the Irish Baptist College Library and the Irish Baptist Historical Society Archives.

Located at 19 Hillsborough Road outside Lisburn, it was built in 2003 and opened on 10 May 2003.

== Role ==
The building has an important role in the life of ABC and the community. The building is an example of a 21st-century multi purpose church centre and is visited by other denomination leaders regularly from across Europe. The centre is the largest Christian resource in Lisburn and is used by many evangelical churches in the area.

== Building ==
It is a 4,300 m^{2} (14,000 ft^{2}) purpose built complex housing the training and administration facilities. It is situated just off the M1 motorway at Moira.

== Baptist Theological Centre ==
The Baptist Theological Centre makes up part of the Baptist Centre and contains the Irish Baptist College.

=== Future expansion ===
The waste ground to the back of the centre provides ample space for expansion. The association and college continue to grow in size and plans are in place for future expansion for the "proposed extension to the Baptist Theological Centre, to provide additional library, archive, storage and study space" since 25 July 2008, application number 0738/F. It was passed on 6 October 2008.

Expansion plans for a new purpose built library complex were mothballed in 2009 due to IBC and ABC financial constraints. The decision is controversial among students, some IBC staff and Baptist Theological Centre users.

== County dispute ==
The Baptist Centre is in a situation in which it can be said that it is in three counties. Due to the Centre being in Moira, in County Down, it can be said that it is in County Down (used most frequently by ABCI and its departments). Due to its post town being Craigavon (the Centre's full address is "19, Hillsborough Road, Moira, CRAIGAVON, County Armagh BT67 0HG, UK") it can be said that it is in County Armagh. Due to the Centre's location within County Antrim, it can be correctly said that it is in County Antrim.

== See also ==
- Association of Baptist Churches in Ireland
- Irish Baptist College Library
- Irish Baptist College
