= David P. Kingdon =

British pastor (1934–2021)

David P. Kingdon (1934–2021) was a British pastor. He served as principal of the Irish Baptist College from 1964 to 1974.

Kingdon attended Spurgeon's Orphanage, and was converted in 1949. He studied at the Reigate Grammar School, Peterhouse, Cambridge and Spurgeon's College and served as a pastor before his appointment to the Irish Baptist College.

Kingdon was a Reformed Baptist. He wrote Children of Abraham: A Reformed Baptist View of the Covenants. J. Douma notes that Kingdon's view is a distinctly Reformed defence of believer's baptism: "He wants to adopt the Reformed standpoint by not cutting the ties between the Old and New Testament."
