= Adam Muery =

American politician

Adam Muery is a politician in the State of Texas and in the United States. He is a Master Texas Peace Officer, a former United States Marine and a licensed pilot. He is a graduate of Texas A&M University and the University of Texas School of Law. He has a wife and four children.

== Career ==
From 2005 through 2007, he served under Texas Attorney General Greg Abbott as Counsel for the Office of Special Investigations and as Law Enforcement Liaison to the Attorney General.

He also served in Governor Perry's Division of Emergency Management, as officer in charge of the United States Border Patrol Operations Center while on state active duty for the Texas Military Forces.

In 2007 and 2008, he served in Iraq in a joint role with the United States Departments of Justice, State, and Defense as Lead National Police Advisor, Deputy Director of Training for the Ministry of Interior, acting director of Training for the Ministry of Interior, and Chief Inspector General for the Ministry of Interior. After returning to Texas, he entered private practice and within 18 months was named one of the top business litigators in Houston by a regional publication. He was named a Texas Superlawyer Rising Star in the area of business litigation.

In 2010, he ran unsuccessfully for The Woodlands Township Board with a campaign focused primarily on improving public safety and eliminating wasteful spending. He later accepted a position with the Border Prosecution Unit where he prosecuted all border related crimes within Terrell, Edwards, Val Verde and Kinney Counties - an area larger than New Jersey. He also served as First Assistant District Attorney for the 21st Judicial District of Texas before returning to private practice.
