= Christianity in Ireland =

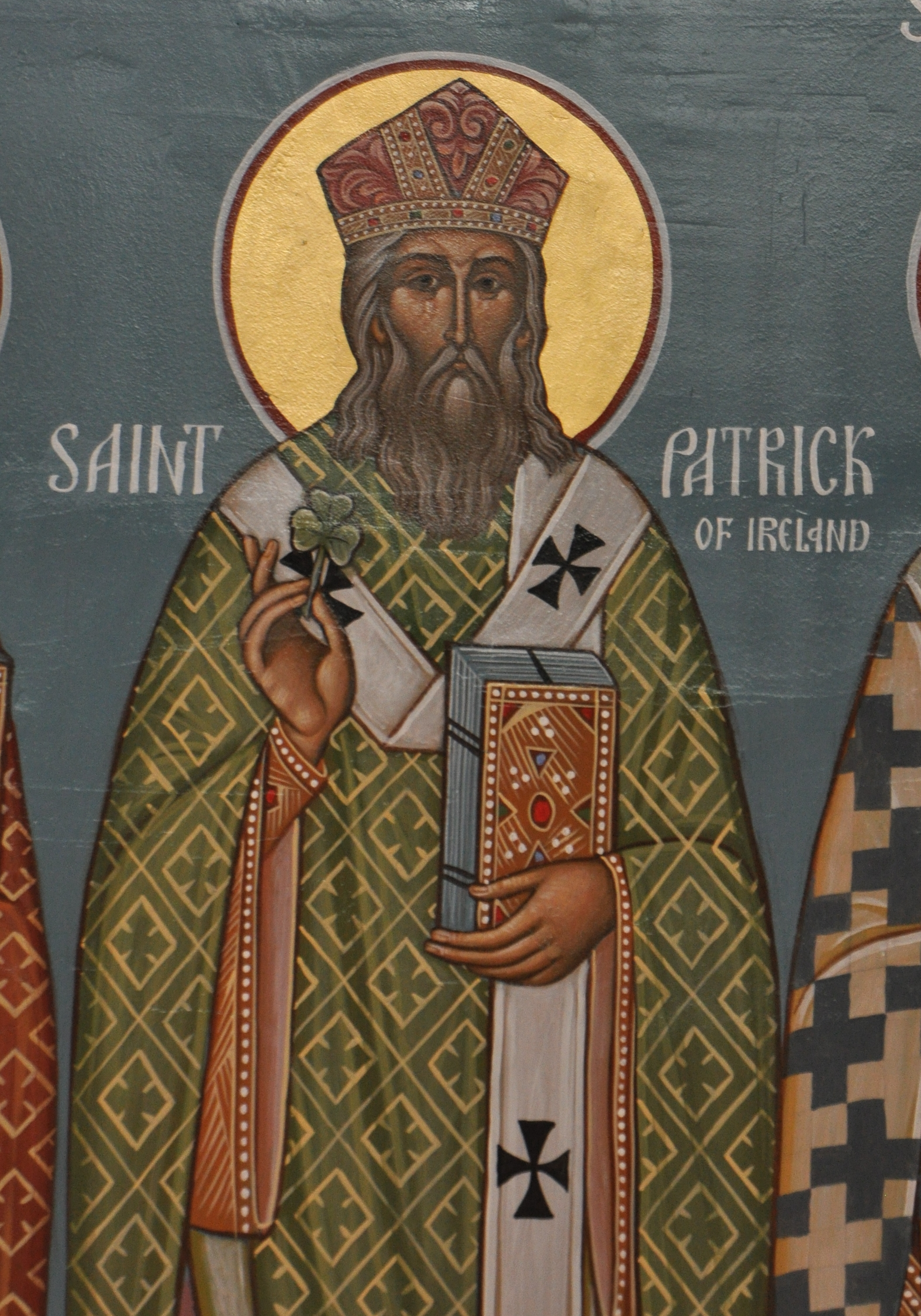
Saint Patrick, a Romano-Briton Christian missionary, generally recognised as the primary patron saint of Ireland. Brigid of Kildare the matron saint of Ireland and Columba are also popular patron saints.

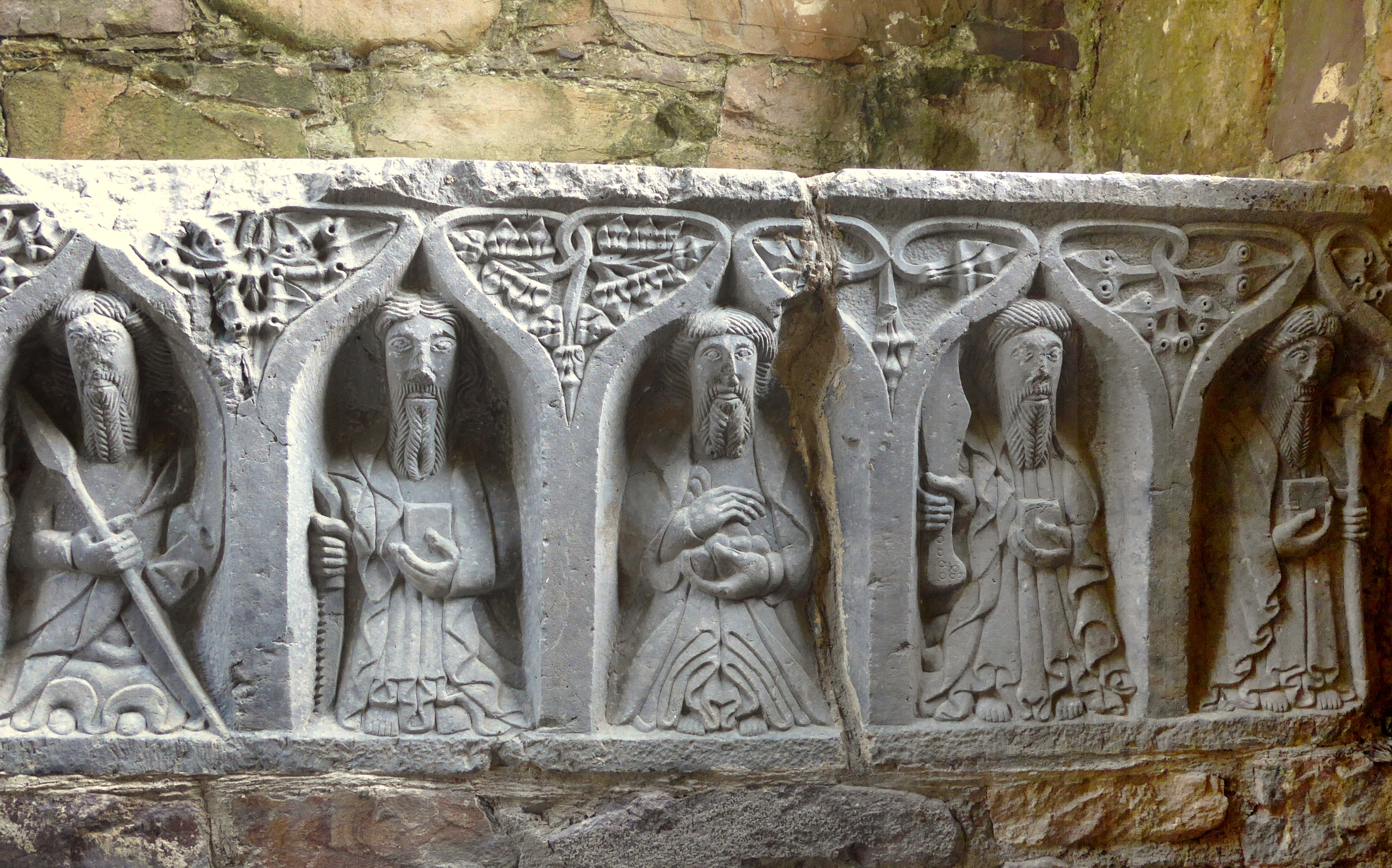
Ancient carvings at the site of Jerpoint Abbey, County Kilkenny

Christianity has been the largest religion in Ireland since the 5th century. After a pagan past of Antiquity, missionaries (most famously including Saint Patrick) converted the Irish tribes to Christianity in quick order. This produced a great number of saints in the Early Middle Ages, as well as a faith interwoven with Irish identity for centuries since − though less so in recent times.

Most Christian churches are organized on an "all-Ireland" basis, including both the Republic of Ireland and Northern Ireland. In the 2022 census, 76.1% of residents in the Republic of Ireland identified as Christians: 69.1% as Catholics, 4.2% as Protestants, 2.1% as Orthodox Christians and 0.7% as other Christians. In the 2021 Northern Irish census, 79.7% of residents identified as Christians: 42.3% as Catholics, 16.6% as Prebysterian, 11.5% as Church of Ireland members, 2.4% as Methodist and 6.9% as other Christians. Orthodoxy has been the fastest growing branch of Christianity in Ireland since 1991.

Ireland has for many centuries been noted for its perpetually strong Christian faith. However, in recent decades, a "Quiet Revolution" has taken place which has led to increased secularity in various aspects of Irish society. The 1972 amendment of the Irish constitution, for example, removed the "special position" of the Catholic Church as "guardian of the Faith" and the recognition of other named religious denominations in Ireland. However, in 1983 abortion was banned by the Eighth Amendment of the Irish constitution which recognized the right to life of the unborn as equal to the right to life of the mother and was advocated for by representatives of the Catholic Church. Only in 2018 was a referendum held to repeal the Eighth Amendment, and this repeal marks a significant point in the secularization of the constitution made possible by a significant secularization of the people. Today, a large proportion of Irish Christians are thought to be nominally so, for reasons ranging from cultural to apathetic. Catholicism has been declining in the Republic of Ireland.

== History ==
The introduction of Christianity to Ireland dates to sometime before the 5th century, presumably through interactions with Roman Britain. A single documented event dates from 430, when Palladius, a bishop born in France, was sent by Pope Celestine I to minister to the "Scots believing in Christ". While this is evidence of Christianity existing in Ireland prior to 430, nothing more may be said for certain.

The early Irish church developed a strong monastic tradition. Some Eastern Orthodox Christians argue that the Irish church also had an Apostolic connection and was effectively a provincial form of Eastern Orthodox Christianity up until the East-West Schism of 1054.

=== Apostle of the Irish ===
The traditional story of Saint Patrick says he was from Bannavem Taburniae, the location of which is unclear. His birthplace is not known with any certainty; some traditions place it in England—one identifying it as Glannoventa (modern Ravenglass in Cumbria)—but claims have also been advanced for locations in present-day Scotland or in Wales He was captured and brought to Ireland and later sold as a slave. After escaping and returning to his own people, he began to receive visions of the cry of the Pagan Irish pleading him to come among them. Believing that he had been called by God to mission to the Irish, he entered the monastery of St Martin of Tours in Gaul. After his consecration as a bishop in Rome, he was sent by Pope Celestine (who died on 27 July 432) to Ireland, where he arrived in 432 as a missionary. He was not sent by Rome but came in defiance of ecclesiastical law which forbade bishops leaving their diocese. Patrick's 'Declaration' or 'Confession' was an answer to the charges brought against him in England. Patrick died in 461. The Uí Néill dynasty of Armagh got Tireachan and Muirchu to write spurious accounts of Patrick to establish Armagh's claims to the revenues of the churches and monasteries of Ireland. Brehon Law at the time granted revenues forever to the heirs of the founder. When southerner Brian Ború assumed the High Kingship of Ireland around 1000 AD, he had his secretary write into the Book of Armagh a confirmation of the right of Armagh to all church revenues in Ireland. It is said that Patrick built 365 churches and consecrated an equal number of bishops, established schools and convents, and held synods.

=== Missionaries abroad ===
In the 6th and 7th centuries missionaries from Ireland to England and Continental Europe spread news of the flowering of learning, and scholars from other nations moved to Irish monasteries. The excellence and isolation of these monasteries helped preserve Latin learning during the Early Middle Ages. The period of Insular art - mainly in the fields of illuminated manuscripts, metalworking, and sculpture - flourished and produced such treasures as the Book of Kells (c. 800), the Ardagh Chalice, and the many carved stone crosses that dot the island of Ireland.

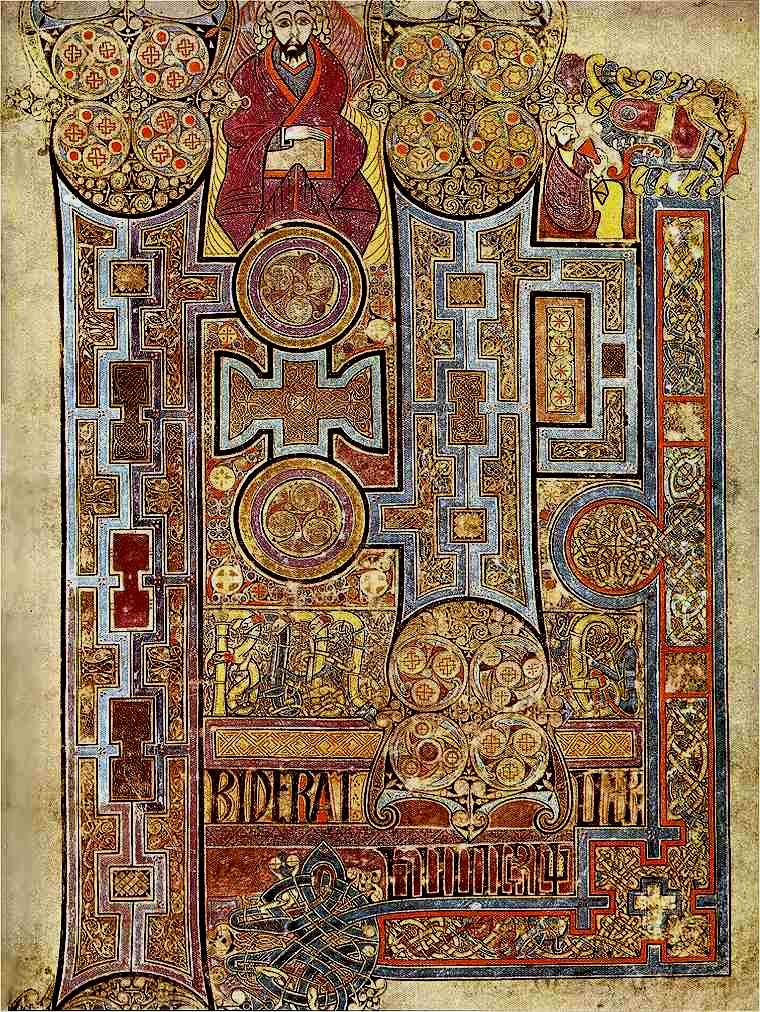
A page from the Book of Kells that opens the Gospel of John

These monasteries served as sanctuaries to many of the continent's great scholars and theologians. It was here that the lamp of Latin learning was preserved for the ages. During this age, the great illuminated manuscripts of Ireland were produced. Arguably the finest example of such works is The Book of Kells, now displayed at Trinity College Dublin.

The first significant renewal of learning in the West came with the Carolingian Renaissance of the Early Middle Ages. Charlemagne (r. 768–814), advised by Peter of Pisa (744–799) and by Alcuin of York (c. 735 | 804), attracted the scholars of England and Ireland, and by decree in AD 787 established schools in every abbey in his empire. These schools, from which the term scholasticism derives, became centres of medieval learning. During the early Scholastic period, knowledge of the Greek language had vanished in the west except in Ireland, where it was widely dispersed in the monastic schools.

Irish scholars had a considerable presence in the Frankish court, where they were renowned for their learning. Among them was Johannes Scotus Eriugena (c. 815- c. 877), one of the founders of scholasticism. Eriugena was the most significant Irish intellectual of the early monastic period, and an outstanding philosopher in terms of originality. He had considerable familiarity with the Greek language, and translated many works into Latin, affording access to the Cappadocian Fathers and the Greek theological tradition.

=== The Vikings arrive ===
During the ninth and tenth centuries, waves of Norse warriors ransacked Ireland. Vikings targeted monasteries because of their treasures of silver religious ornaments. However, they failed to fully conquer the island as they did in other lands in Europe like England, Russia, Scotland, and France because of Ireland's decentralized system of governance. With so many kings to bargain or depose, the Vikings could ransack a few cities but could not hold territory. By the end of the 10th century, they had fully integrated into Irish life, and many had chosen to convert to Christianity.

=== Cambro-Normans ===
In the first year of his reign (1154), Henry II of England procured a Papal bull from the English-born Pope Adrian IV authorising him to proceed to Ireland "to check the torrent of wickedness to reform evil manners, to sow the seeds of virtue". The following year, Adrian authorised Henry II to invade Ireland in order "to proclaim the truths of the Christian religion to a rude and ignorant people"; on condition that a penny should be paid annually from each house to the See of Rome.

In 1168 Macmurrogh, King of Leinster, driven from his kingdom, sought Henry's aid, and then Adrian's Bull was remembered. A contingent of Cambro-Norman knights went to Ireland in 1169. In 1171 Henry himself landed at Waterford. The king proceeded to Dublin where he spent the winter and received the submission of many Irish kings.

In late 1171, an assembly of the Irish clergy gathered at Cashel and proclaimed Henry's title to the sovereign dominion of Ireland. The assembly took the oath of fidelity to him and his successors.

Pope Alexander III, gratified with this extension of his dominion, issued in September 1172 a brief confirming the bull of Adrian and expressing a hope that "the barbarous nation" would attain under the government of Henry "to some decency of manners"; he also wrote three epistles—one to Henry II, one to the kings and nobles of Ireland, and one to its ecclesiastical hierarchy—enjoining obedience of Ireland to England, and of both to the see of Saint Peter.

In some ways, the change was advantageous to the church hierarchy. Under the ancient system, the native chieftains were absolute masters over all their followers, including the clergy. According to the new order introduced by Henry II, the chieftains no longer had authority over the clergy. To maintain their sovereignty over the Irish clergy, the English kings filled the vacant sees mostly with Englishmen. The Irish clergy in turn appealed to Rome to confirm their nomination. Jealousy, hostility and disputes characterised the relations between the English and the Irish ecclesiastics; the latter sought to transfer their allegiance as churchmen from the sovereign of England to the pope of Rome, and so the struggle for supremacy lasted for centuries.

The Crown of England did not gain full control of Ireland until the 16th and 17th centuries; the whole island was subjected to a number of military campaigns in the period from 1534 to 1691. During this period, the island was colonised by English and Scottish Protestant settlers. Most of the native Irish remained Catholic.

=== Reformation ===
In 1536 during the English Reformation, King Henry VIII of England arranged to be declared head of the Church in Ireland through the Act of Supreme Head of the Church in Ireland passed by the Irish Reformation Parliament.{ When the Church of England underwent reform under King Edward VI of England (r. 1547–1553), the Church of Ireland followed. All but two of the Irish bishops accepted the Elizabethan Settlement, although the vast majority of priests and the church membership remained Catholic. The Church of Ireland claims Apostolic succession because of the continuity in the hierarchy; however, this is disputed by the Catholic Church.

During the Tudor conquest of Ireland by the Protestant state of England in the course of the 16th century, the Elizabethan state failed to convert the population to Protestantism. There was also a vigorous campaign of proselytising by Counter-Reformation Catholic clergy. The result was that Catholicism came to be identified with a sense of nativism and Protestantism came to be identified with the State.

The established church in Ireland underwent a period of more radical Calvinist doctrine than occurred in England. James Ussher (later Archbishop of Armagh) authored the Irish Articles, adopted in 1615. In 1634, the Irish Convocation adopted the English Thirty-Nine Articles alongside the Irish Articles. After the Restoration of 1660, it seems that the Thirty-Nine Articles took precedence; they remain the official doctrine of the Church of Ireland even after disestablishment.

The Penal Laws, first introduced in the early 17th century, were initially designed to force the native elite to conform to the state church by excluding Non-conformists and Catholics from public office, but were later, starting under Queen Elizabeth, also used to confiscate virtually all Catholic owned land and grant it to Protestant settlers from England and Scotland. The Penal Laws had a lasting effect on the population, due to their severity (celebrating Catholicism in any form was punishable by death or enslavement under the laws), and the favouritism granted Irish Anglicans served to polarise the community in terms of religion. (see Anti-Protestantism in Early Modern Ireland 1536–1691) thus was also largely a form of hostility to the colonisation of Ireland. Irish poetry of this era shows a marked antipathy to Protestantism, one such poem reading, "The faith of Christ [Catholicism] with the faith of Luther is like ashes in the snow". The mixture of resistance to colonisation and religious disagreements led to widespread massacres of Protestant settlers in the Irish Rebellion of 1641. Subsequent religious or sectarian antipathy was fuelled by the atrocities committed by both sides in the Irish Confederate Wars, especially the repression of Catholicism during and after the Cromwellian conquest of Ireland, when Irish Catholic land was confiscated en masse, clergy were executed and discriminatory legislation was passed against Catholics.

The Church of Ireland undertook the first publication of Scripture in Irish. The first Irish translation of the New Testament was begun by Nicholas Walsh, Bishop of Ossory, who worked on it until his untimely death in 1585. The work was continued by John Kearny, his assistant, and Dr. Nehemiah Donellan, Archbishop of Tuam; it was finally completed by William O'Domhnuill (William Daniell, Archbishop of Tuam in succession to Donellan). Their work was printed in 1602. The work of translating the Old Testament was undertaken by William Bedel (1571–1642), Bishop of Kilmore, who completed his translation within the reign of Charles I, although it was not published until 1680 in a revised version by Narcissus Marsh (1638–1713), Archbishop of Dublin. William Bedell had undertaken a translation of the Book of Common Prayer in 1606. An Irish translation of the revised prayer book of 1662 was effected by John Richardson (1664–1747) and published in 1712.

The English-speaking minority mostly adhered to the Church of Ireland or to Presbyterianism, while the Irish-speaking majority remained faithful to Catholicism, which remained by far the majority denomination in Ireland.

==== Union with Great Britain ====
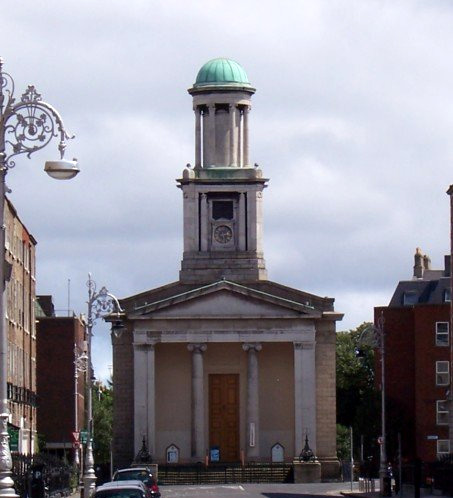
The Dublin area saw many churches like Saint Stephen's, built in the Georgian style during the 18th century.

When Ireland was incorporated in 1801 into the new United Kingdom of Great Britain and Ireland, the Church of Ireland was also united with the Church of England to form the United Church of England and Ireland. At the same time, one archbishop and three bishops from Ireland (selected by rotation) were given seats in the House of Lords at Westminster, joining the two archbishops and twenty-four bishops from the Church of England.

In 1833, the British Government proposed the Irish Church Measure to reduce the 22 archbishops and bishops who oversaw the Anglican minority in Ireland to a total of 12 by amalgamating sees and using the revenues saved for the use of parishes. This sparked the Oxford Movement, which was to have wide repercussions for the Anglican Communion.

As the official established church, the Church of Ireland was funded partially by tithes imposed on all Irish citizens, irrespective of the fact that it counted only a minority of the populace among its adherents; these tithes were a source of much resentment which occasionally boiled over, as in the "Tithe War" of 1831/36. Eventually, the tithes were ended, replaced with a lower levy called the tithe rentcharge.

The Irish Church Act 1869 (which took effect in 1871) finally ended the role of the Church of Ireland as the state church. This terminated both state support and parliament's role in its governance, but also took into government ownership much church property. Compensation was provided to clergy, but many parishes faced great difficulty in local financing after the loss of rent-generating lands and buildings. The Church of Ireland made provision in 1870 for its own government, led by a General Synod, and with financial management by a Representative Church Body. With disestablishment in 1869, the last remnants of tithes were abolished and the Church's representation in the House of Lords also ceased.

== Demographic statistics ==
Proportion of respondents to the Ireland census 2011 or the Northern Ireland census 2011 who stated they were Catholic. Areas in which Catholics are in the majority are blue. Areas in which Catholics are in a minority are red.

=== Republic of Ireland, 2022 ===
Religion	Number ('000)
Catholic Church in Ireland	3,515.9
Church of Ireland (Anglican)	124.7
Presbyterian	22.7
Apostolic or Pentecostal	13.5
Orthodox (Greek, Coptic, Russian)	100.2
Evangelical	8.6
Jehovah's Witness	6.3
Methodist, Wesleyan	5.1
Protestant	4.6
Baptist	4.0
Lutheran	3.4
Born-again Christian	3.1
Other Christian	37.3
Muslim	81.9
Hindu	33.0
Buddhist	9.0
Other non-Christian	21.2
No religion/Atheist	736.2
Not stated	339.5
Total (including no religion and other religions)	5,084.9

Source: 2022 census of Ireland.

=== Northern Ireland, 2021 ===
Religion	Adherents	%
Catholic	805,151	42.3
Presbyterian Church in Ireland	316,103	16.6
Church of Ireland	219,788	11.5
Methodist Church in Ireland	44,728	2.4
Other Christian (Including Christian Related)	130,377	6.9
(Total non-Catholic Christian)	710,996	37.4
Other Religions and Philosophies	25,519	1.3
No religion or Religion not Stated	361,512	19.0

Source: UK 2021 Census.

== Christian Churches in Ireland ==
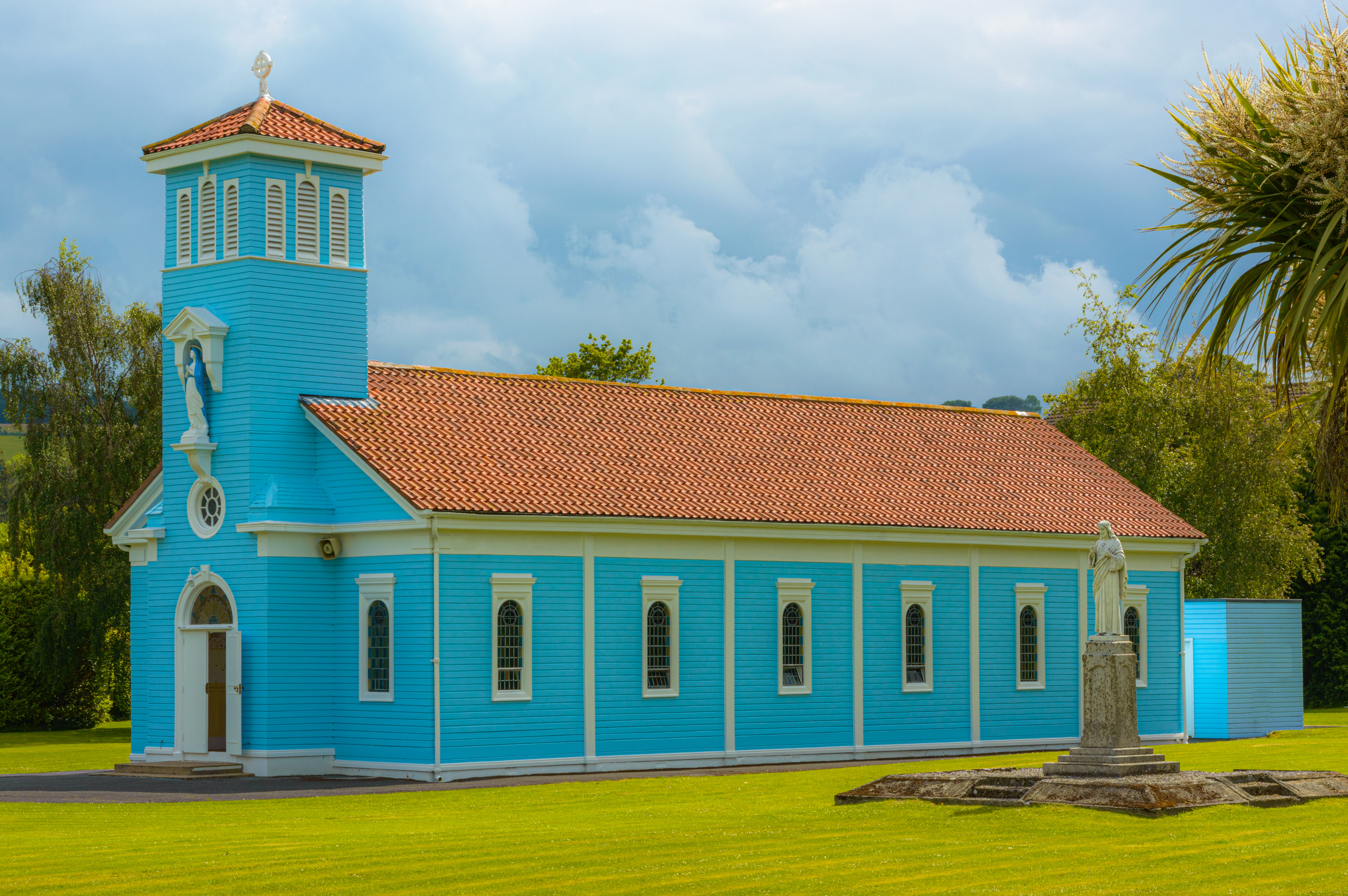
Our Lady of the Wayside Church (Catholic) in County Dublin

=== Catholic Church ===
Catholicism in Ireland is part of the worldwide Catholic Church. The Catholic Church in Ireland serves Catholics in both the Republic of Ireland and Northern Ireland under the spiritual leadership of Pope Leo XIV and the Conference of Irish Bishops. In the Republic of Ireland, 87.4% of the citizens were baptised Catholic as infants while the figure for Northern Ireland is 43.8%.

Christianity had arrived in Ireland by the early 5th century, and spread through the works of early missionaries such as Palladius, and Saint Patrick. The Church is organised into four provinces; however, these are not coterminous with the modern civil provincial divisions. The church is led by four archbishops and twenty-three bishops; however, because there have been amalgamations and absorptions, there are more than twenty-seven dioceses. For instance, the diocese of Cashel has been joined with the diocese of Emly, Waterford with Lismore, and Ardagh with Clonmacnoise. The bishop of Galway is also the Apostolic Administrator of Kilfenora. There are 1,087 parishes, a few of which are governed by administrators, the remainder by parish priests. There about 3,000 secular clergy—parish priests, administrators, curates, chaplains, and professors in colleges.

There are many Catholic religious institutes, including Augustinians, Capuchins, Carmelites, Fathers of the Holy Ghost, Dominicans, Franciscans, Jesuits, Marists, Order of Charity, Oblates, Passionists, Redemptorists, and Vincentians. The total number of the regular clergy is about 700. They are engaged either in teaching or in giving missions, but not charged with the government of parishes.

Irish travellers have traditionally adopted a very particular attitude to the Catholic church, with a focus on figures such as "healing priests". More generally a tradition of visions continues, often outside of Church sanction.

=== Protestantism ===
The majority of the people of Northern Ireland are recorded as members of the various Protestant churches such as the Presbyterian Church, Church of Ireland, Methodist Church and several others. While the Catholic Church is the largest single denomination in either jurisdiction, it is smaller than the combined Protestant denominations in Northern Ireland.

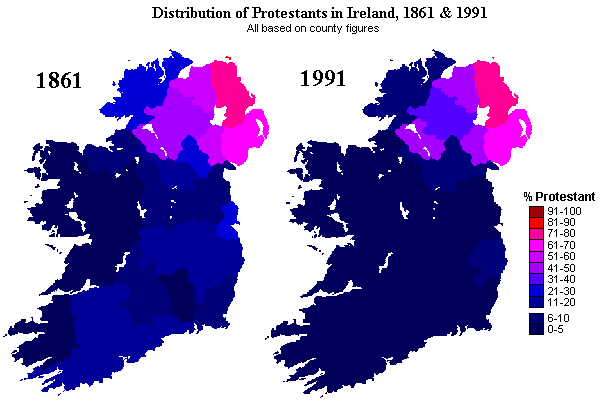
Concentration of Protestants in Ireland per county.

In the Republic of Ireland, approximately 3% were recorded as members of various Protestant (1991). The proportion was more than 10% in 1891 – a drop to less than a third of the previous percentage. The percentage in 2011 is almost 5%.

In 1861, only the west coast and Kilkenny had less than 6% Protestant population. Dublin and two of the border counties had over 20% Protestant. By 1991, however, all counties had fewer than 6% Protestants, with four having less than 1%. There are no counties in the Republic of Ireland which have experienced a rise in the relative Protestant population over the period 1861 to 1991. The counties which retain the highest proportion of Protestants tend to be those which started off with a large proportion. In Northern Ireland, only counties Londonderry, Tyrone and Armagh have experienced a significant loss of relative Protestant population, though at a lesser rate than in the Republic.

==== Anglicanism ====
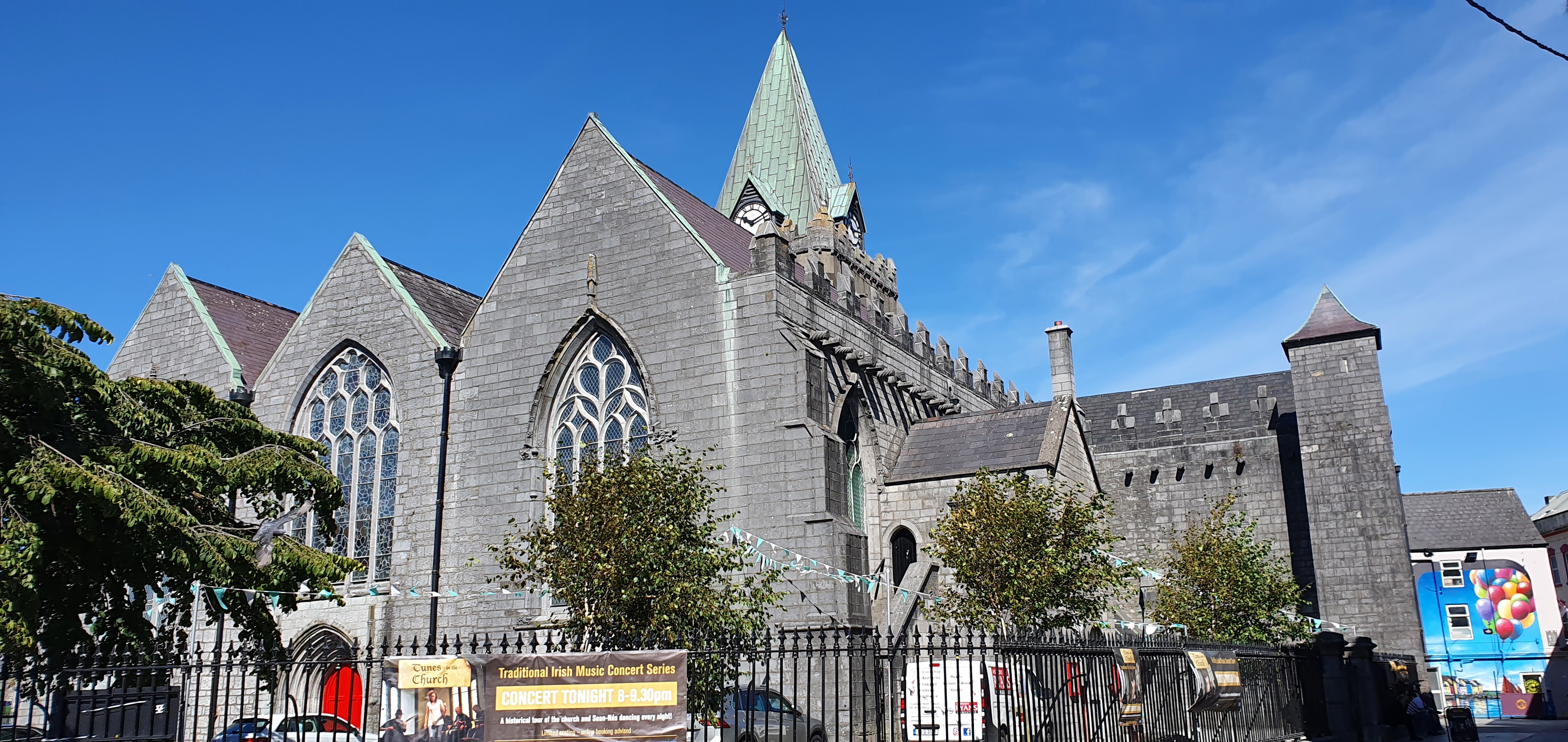
St. Nicholas' Collegiate Church (Anglican) in County Galway

The Church of Ireland is an autonomous province of the Anglican Communion, operating across the island of Ireland and the largest non-Catholic religious body on the island. Like other Episcopal churches, it considers itself to be both Catholic, in that its beliefs and practices are based on a continuous tradition dating back to the early Church, and Reformed, in that it does not accept the Primacy of the Bishop of Rome.

When the church in England broke communion from the Catholic Church, all but two of the bishops of the Church in Ireland followed the Church of England, although almost no clergy or laity did so. The reformed Church in Ireland then became the state church, assuming possession of most church property (and so retaining a great repository of religious architecture and other items, though some were later destroyed). The substantial majority of the population never changed adherence, remaining strongly Catholic, though there were good reasons for joining the state church. Despite its numerical minority, however, the Church of Ireland remained the official state church until it was disestablished on 1 January 1871 by the Irish Church Act 1869.

Like other Irish churches, the Church of Ireland did not divide when Ireland was partitioned in the 1920s, and it continues to be governed on an all-Ireland basis. Today the Church of Ireland is, after the Catholic Church, the second-largest Christian church in all of Ireland and the third largest in Northern Ireland after the Catholic and Presbyterian churches. It is governed by a synod of clergy and laity and organised into two ecclesiastical provinces: Armagh, led by the Archbishop of Armagh (styled "Primate of All Ireland"), currently John McDowell and Dublin, led by the Archbishop of Dublin, Michael Jackson.

It has been reported that Irish Catholics are joining the Church of Ireland "in strong numbers."

The 16th-century apologist Richard Hooker posits that there are three sources of authority in Anglicanism: scripture, tradition and reason. It is not known how widely accepted this idea is within Anglicanism. It is further posited that the three sources uphold and critique each other in a dynamic way. In Hooker's model, scripture is the primary means of arriving at doctrine; things stated plainly in scripture are accepted as true. Issues that are ambiguous are determined by tradition, which is checked by reason. This may usefully be contrasted with the teachings of the Catholic and Eastern Orthodox churches which list three sources of authority: Sacred Scripture, Sacred Tradition and Magisterium. Reason is not listed as a source of authority or teaching in these churches.

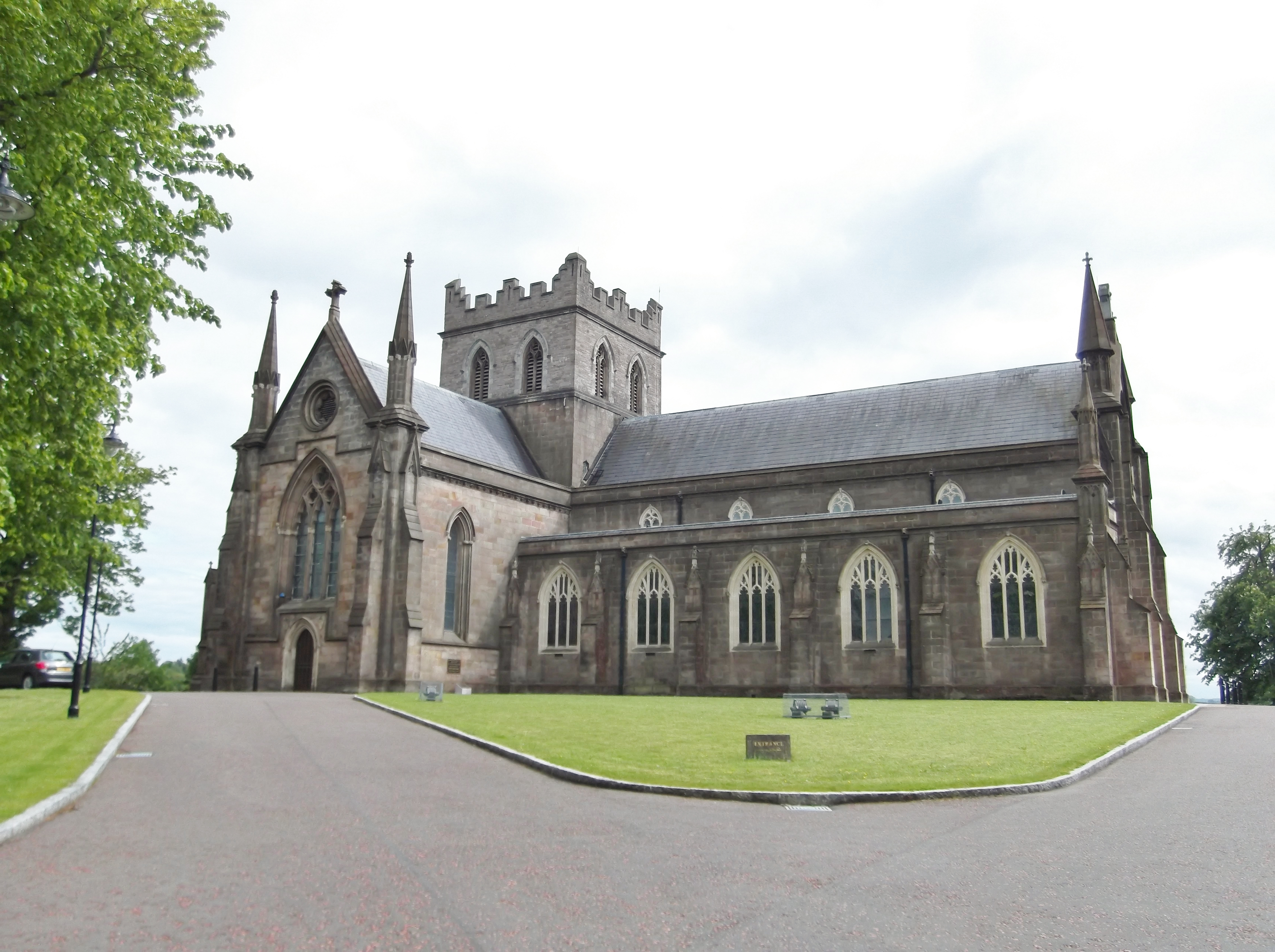
St. Patrick's Cathedral, Armagh

The contemporary Church of Ireland, despite having a number of High Church (often described as Anglo-Catholic) parishes, is generally on the Low Church end of the spectrum of world Anglicanism. Historically, it had little of the difference in churchmanship between parishes characteristic of other Anglican Provinces, although a number of markedly liberal High Church, or evangelical parishes have developed in recent decades. It was the second province of the Anglican Communion after the Anglican Church of New Zealand (1857) to adopt, on its 1871 disestablishment, synodical government, and was one of the first provinces to ordain women to the priesthood (1991).

The Church of Ireland has two cathedrals in Dublin: within the walls of the old city is Christ Church Cathedral, the seat of the Archbishop of Dublin, and just outside the old walls is St. Patrick's Cathedral, which the church designated as a National Cathedral for Ireland in 1870. Cathedrals also exist in the other dioceses. The church operates a library and seminary, the Church of Ireland Theological College, in Rathgar, in the south inner suburbs of Dublin. The church's central offices are in Rathmines, adjacent to the Church of Ireland College of Education.

Christ Church in Lisburn with the Union Flag flying on the left.

The Church in 1999 voted to prohibit the flying of flags other than the St. Patrick's Flag. However, the Union Flag continues to fly on many churches in Northern Ireland.

===== Membership =====
The Church of Ireland experienced major decline during the 20th century, both in Northern Ireland, where around 65% of its members live, and in the Republic of Ireland which contains upwards of 35%. However, the Church of Ireland in the Republic has shown substantial growth in the last two national censuses; its membership is now back to the levels of sixty years ago (albeit with fewer churches as many have been closed). Church membership increased by 8.7% in the period 2002–2006, during which the population as a whole increased by only 8.2%. Various reasons for this increase have been proposed. One such theory is the relaxation of the Ne Temere regulations that stipulated that children of mixed Catholic-Protestant marriages should be brought up as Catholics. It is also partly explained by the number of Anglican immigrants who have moved to Ireland recently. In addition, some parishes, especially in middle-class areas of the larger cities, report significant numbers of Catholics joining the Church of Ireland. A number of clergy originally ordained in the Catholic Church have now become Church of Ireland clergy and many former Catholics also put themselves forward for ordination after they had become members of the Church of Ireland.

The 2006 Census in the Republic of Ireland showed that the numbers of people describing themselves as members of the Church of Ireland increased in every county. The highest percentage growth was in the west (Counties Galway, Mayo, and Roscommon) and the largest numerical growth was in the mid-east region (Wicklow, Kildare, and Meath). Co Wicklow is the county with the highest proportion of Church of Ireland members (6.88%); Greystones Co. Wicklow has the highest proportion of any town (9.77%).

===== Structure =====
The polity of the Church of Ireland is Episcopalian church governance, which is the same as other Anglican churches. The Church maintains the traditional structure dating to pre-Reformation times, a system of geographical parishes organised into dioceses. There are twelve of these, each headed by a bishop. The leader of the five southern bishops is the Archbishop of Dublin; that of the seven northern bishops is the Archbishop of Armagh; these are styled Primate of Ireland and Primate of All Ireland, respectively, suggesting the ultimate seniority of the latter. Although he has relatively little absolute authority, the Archbishop of Armagh is respected as the Church's general leader and spokesman, and is elected in a process different from those for all other bishops.

Canon law and church policy are decided by the Church's General Synod, and changes in policy must be passed by both the House of Bishops and the House of Representatives (Clergy and Laity). Important changes, e.g., the decision to ordain female priests, must be passed by two-thirds majorities. While the House of Representatives always votes publicly, often by orders, the House of Bishops has tended to vote in private, coming to a decision before matters reach the floor of the Synod. This practice has been broken only once, when in 1999 the House of Bishops voted unanimously in public to endorse the efforts of the Archbishop of Armagh, the Diocese of Armagh, and the Standing Committee of the General Synod of the Church of Ireland in their attempts to resolve the crisis at the Church of the Ascension at Drumcree, near Portadown.

The Church of Ireland embraces three orders of ministry: deacon, priest (or presbyter), and bishop. These orders are distinct from functional titles such as rector, vicar or canon.

==== Presbyterianism ====
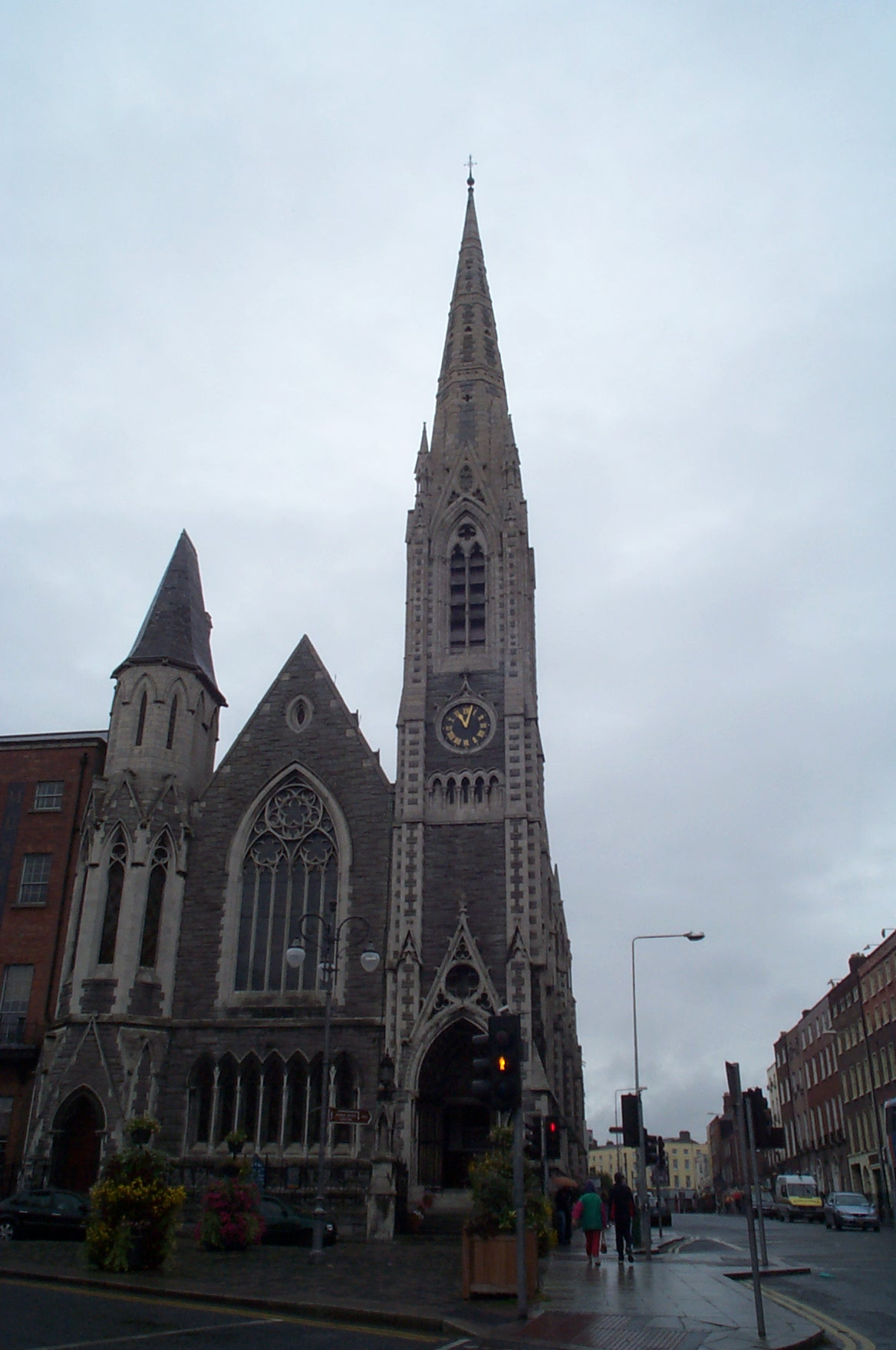
Abbey Presbyterian Church, Dublin

The Presbyterian Church in Ireland, operating on an all-Ireland basis, is the largest Presbyterian denomination in Ireland, and the largest Protestant denomination in Northern Ireland. The motto is Ardens sed Virens – burning but flourishing. The Church has a membership of approximately 300,000 people in 550 congregations across Ireland. About 96% of the membership is in Northern Ireland. It is the second largest church in Northern Ireland, the first being the Catholic Church in the Republic of Ireland the church is the second largest Protestant denomination, after the Church of Ireland.

The Presbyterian Church in Ireland is involved in education, evangelism, social service and mission in a number of areas around the world. The Word of God is central in the Presbyterian Church, along with prayer and praise. The order of service varies from church to church but it generally involves a hymn, followed by a prayer, followed by a children's address and a children's hymn. This is then followed by an expository sermon by the minister and another hymn, then another prayer and a closing hymn. Many Presbyterian churches mix Psalms and formal hymns with choruses, suitable for children, and many churches now have praise bands with a variety of instruments, as well as the traditional organ.

The current (2023–24) moderator is the Right Reverend Dr Sam Mawhinney, minister of Adelaid Road Presbyterian Church, Dublin. The headquarters of the church are at Church House in Belfast. Plans to relocate to a new development in May Street have been cancelled. The Presbyterian Church in Ireland, a founding member of the World Alliance of Reformed Churches, has over 550 congregations in 19 presbyteries across Ireland. The church's two nineteenth century theological colleges, Magee College (Derry) and Assembly's College (Belfast), merged in 1978 to form Union Theological College in Belfast. Union offers post-graduate education to the denomination's candidates for the full-time ministry.

Other Presbyterian denominations in Ireland

- Free Presbyterian Church of Ulster
- Non-subscribing Presbyterian Church of Ireland
- Reformed Presbyterian Church of Ireland
- Evangelical Presbyterian Church

==== Methodism ====
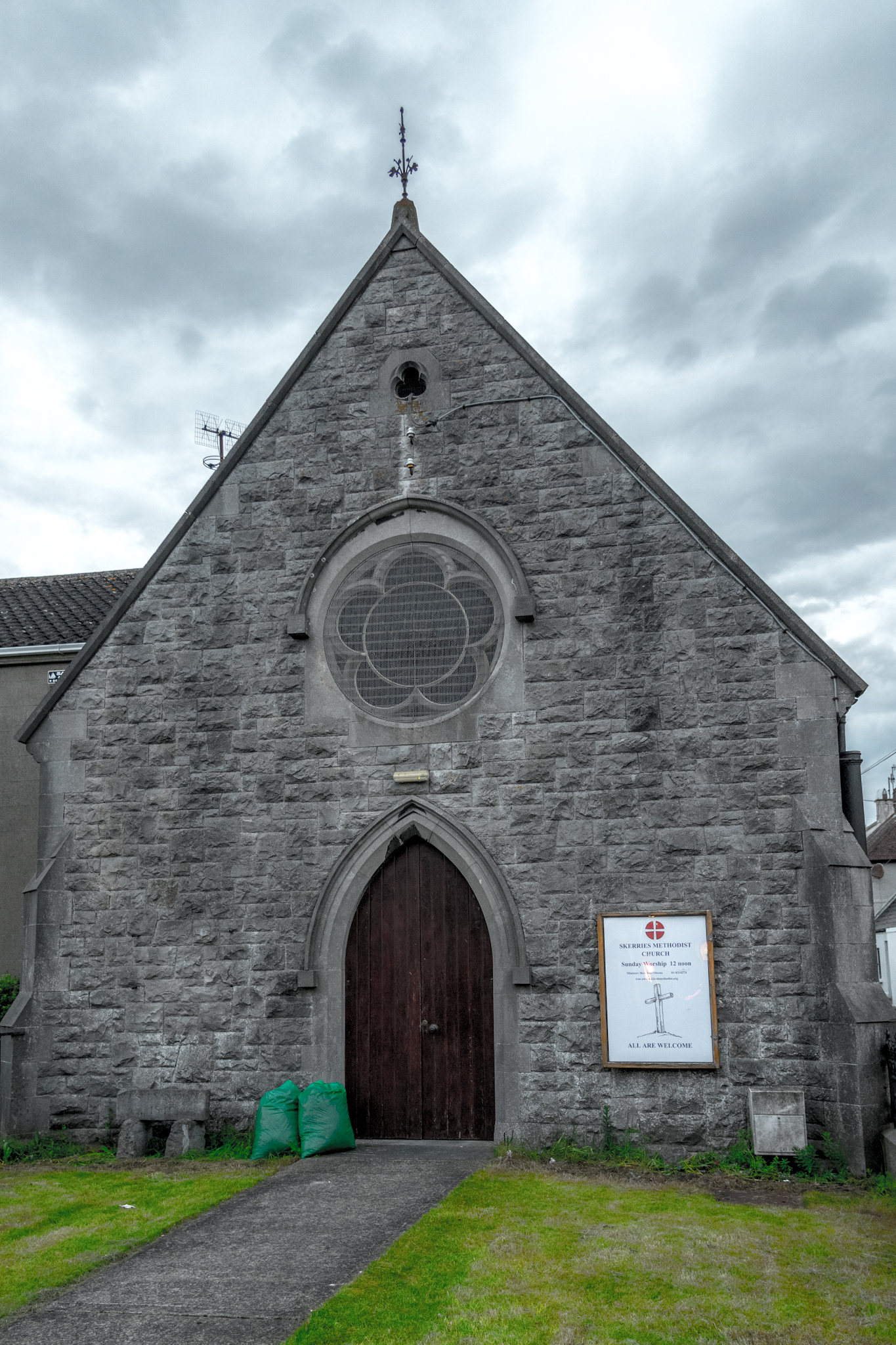
Skerries Methodist Church, Co. Dublin

The Methodist Church in Ireland (MCI) is the largest Methodist denomination in Ireland. They operate throughout the island, with 212 individual societies as of May 2025 The church tends to hold views reflecting theological Conservatism. They support Evangelism, and, to a degree, Social justice

==== Evangelical movements ====
Evangelical movements have recently spread both within the established churches and outside them. Similarly, Celtic Christianity has become increasingly popular within and outside established churches.

=== Eastern Orthodoxy ===
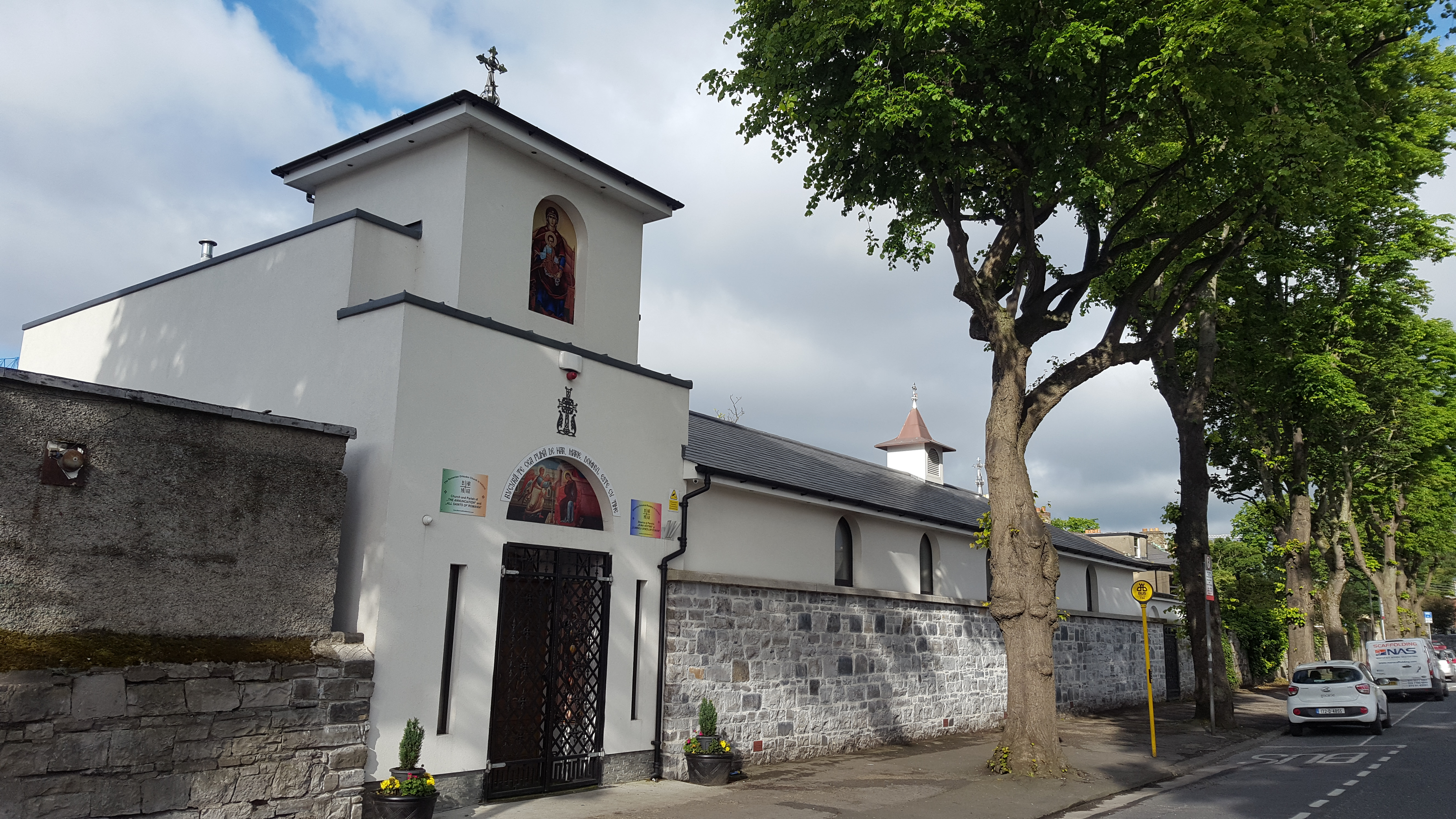
The Church of the Annunciation, Romanian Orthodox Church in County Dublin

Self-governing bodies from various traditions of Eastern Orthodoxy (mainly Greek, Russian, Romanian) have organized in Ireland since the early 20th century.

=== Oriental Orthodoxy ===
Various self-governing bodies from the traditions of Oriental Orthodoxy (mainly Indian, Syriac, Coptic) have also organized in Ireland during 20th century.

=== Religious Society of Friends (Quakers) ===
Quakers first organised themselves in Ireland in 1654 and have 28 congregations with 2000 members. Quakers are organised on an all island basis.

=== Non-Trinitarian ===
==== Latter-day Saints ====
The Church of Jesus Christ of Latter-day Saints has 13 congregations and claims more than 2,900 members in the Republic of Ireland. In addition, the church has 11 congregations in Northern Ireland.

== Sectarianism in Ireland ==
The overthrow, in 1613, of the Catholic majority in the Irish parliament was realised principally through the creation of numerous new boroughs, all of which were Protestant-dominated. By the end of the seventeenth century all Catholics, representing some 85% of Ireland's population then, were banned from the Irish parliament. Political power rested entirely in the hands of a British settler-colonial, and more specifically Anglican, minority while the Catholic population suffered severe political and economic privations.

By the late 18th century, many of the Anglo-Irish ruling class had come to see Ireland as their native country. A Parliamentary faction led by Henry Grattan agitated for a more favourable trading relationship with England and for greater legislative independence for the Parliament of Ireland. However, reform in Ireland stalled over the more radical proposals to enfranchise Irish Catholics. This was enabled in 1793, but Catholics could not yet enter parliament or become government officials.

The Penal Laws against Catholics (and also Presbyterians) were renewed in the late 17th and early 18th centuries due to fear of Catholic support for Jacobitism after the Williamite War in Ireland and were slowly repealed in 1771–1829. Penal Laws against Presbyterians were relaxed by the Toleration Act 1719, due to their siding with the Jacobites in a 1715 rebellion. Nevertheless, this did not prevent the large-scale emigration of Presbyterians and other non-Conformist Protestants out of Ireland. Some 250,000 left for the New World alone between the years 1717 and 1774, most of them arriving there from Ulster. Their descendants account for most of the Protestant portion of the Irish American population today.

Sectarian conflict was continued in the late 18th century in the form of communal violence between rival Catholic and Protestant factions over land and trading rights (see Defenders, Peep O'Day Boys and Orange Institution). The 1820s and 1830s in Ireland saw a major attempt by Protestant evangelists to convert Catholics, a campaign which caused great resentment among Catholics.

In modern Irish nationalism, anti-Protestantism is usually more nationalist than religious in tone. The main reason for this is the identification of Protestants with unionism – i.e. the support for the maintenance of the union with the United Kingdom, and opposition to Home Rule or Irish independence. In Northern Ireland, since the foundation of the Free State in 1921, Catholics, who are mainly nationalists, allege systematic discrimination against them by the Protestant unionist community. The mixture of religious and national identities on both sides reinforces both anti-Catholic and anti-Protestant sectarian prejudice in the province.

More specifically religious anti-Protestantism in Ireland was evidenced by the acceptance of the Ne Temere decrees in the early 20th century, whereby the Catholic Church decreed that all children born into mixed Catholic-Protestant marriages had to be brought up as Catholics. Protestants in Northern Ireland had long held that their religious liberty would be threatened under a 32-county Republic of Ireland, due to that country's Constitutional support of a "special place" in government for the Catholic Church. This was amended in the Republic of Ireland in 1970 however.

The reasons for the dismissal of Mayo librarian Letitia Dunbar-Harrison are sometimes claimed to have been due to anti-Protestant prejudice, but others claim that her qualifications were the main reason and others claim a power struggle between the government in Dublin and local Mayo politics.

== See also ==
- Apostolic Nunciature to Ireland
- Ardbraccan
- Association of Baptist Churches in Ireland
- Bishops' Selection Conference
- Laudabiliter
- List of Anglican dioceses in the United Kingdom and Ireland
- List of cathedrals in Ireland
- List of Catholic dioceses in Ireland
- List of monastic houses in Ireland
- Religion in the United Kingdom
- Segregation in Northern Ireland
- Ulster Scots people
