= Freer Helen Latham =

Methodist schoolteacher and lay leader (1907–1987)

- Born: Freer Helen Robertson; 4 July 1907
- Died: 5 December 1987 (aged 80); Greenwich, Sydney, Australia
- Occupations: Methodist lay leader, schoolteacher
- Known for: President of World Federation of Methodist and Uniting Church Women

Freer Helen Latham (1907–1987) was an Australian schoolteacher and leader in the global Methodist women's movement. She served as vice-president for the Australasian Federation of Methodist Women and also as world president of the World Federation of Methodist Women. She helped to grow these women's organizations at the local, national and global level. She was an advocate for women's leadership in the Methodist church, and encouraged partnerships and collaborative efforts among women in diverse regions of the globe.

== Early life and education ==
Freer Helen Robertson was born on 4 July 1907, in Mullumbimby, New South Wales, Australia. Her parents were Florence Ellen and John Francis Robertson. Her father was an estate agent by profession. Her mother, who had been born in South Africa, was active in the Salvation Army. Freer was the eldest daughter born to the couple. She graduated from Broken Hill High School, and then attended Sydney Teacher's College.

Following graduation, Robertson taught in public schools in Sydney, Broken Hill and Curlwaa from 1927 to 1933. In 1932, she married Raymond John Latham, a cabinet-maker. Their wedding was held on 24 March at the Methodist church in Burwood, a suburb of Sydney. As was conventional, she took on his last name, becoming known as Freer Latham.

After several years in Brisbane, the couple returned to Sydney. During the war years, from 1944 to 1947, Latham taught at the Five Dock public school.

The Lathams had two children together, a son and a daughter. Their son died at age eight of leukemia. Their daughter later married and moved to the United States.

== World Federation of Methodist Women ==
Both Freer and Raymond Latham were active in the Methodist Church. Freer taught Sunday School and served as secretary for the Women's Auxiliary for Overseas Missions (W.A.O.M) for her local Methodist church. Women's involvement in supporting mission work in the Methodist Church dates back to the mid-1800s; Women's Auxiliaries were an important source of funding for missionaries and overseas projects, including education and medical care.

Women's auxiliary societies and other women's groups allowed Methodist women to exert influence and hold leadership roles in the church, at a time when women's full ordination to the ministry was not permitted. Beginning in the 1920s, a movement emerged globally to connect Methodist women's groups, to build alliances and coordinate activities. This movement led to the creation of the World Federation of Methodist Women in 1939.

Following her son's death, Freer Latham became much more active in church work, and became a leader in this global Methodist women's movement. She took on leadership roles in the Methodist women's association in New South Wales, serving as secretary and as vice-president. In 1956, she was one of three delegates representing the Australasian Federation of Methodist Women at the first assembly of the World Federation of Methodist Women. This first global gathering of Methodist women was held in North Carolina in the United States. At the gathering, Latham was elected as the regional vice-president for the Australasian Federation of Methodist Women.

In 1961, at the second global assembly of the World Federation of Methodist Women held in Oslo, Norway, Latham was elected as global president. She succeed Louise Scholz, a Methodist lay leader from Germany. Latham served a five-year term and was succeeded by Patrocinio Ocampo, from the Evangelical Methodist Church in the Philippines. During her term as president, she traveled widely, visiting Methodist women around the globe. She oversaw significant growth in the organization; the federation added new chapters in seven countries, and reached an overall membership of 6 million women.

In 1966, Latham and her husband were delegates to the eleventh World Methodist Conference. As president of the World Federation of Methodist Women, she presented an address to the delegates. Latham emphasized the importance of "unity and fellowship" among women, and supported the development and growth of women's leadership within the church.

In 1971, she was appointed vice-president for life of the New South Wales branch of the World Federation of Methodist Women. She was also honored for her service at the World Federation's assembly in Dublin, Ireland, in 1976.

== Death ==
Latham died in Greenwich, Sydney, on 5 December 1987. She was survived by her husband Raymond.

== See also ==
- Lists of Methodists
- Hannah Dudley
