= Alexander Carson (author) =

Irish writer and theologian (1776–1844)

Alexander Carson (born in Annahone, near Stewartstown, County Tyrone, Ireland in 1776 and died in Belfast, Ireland on 24 August 1844) was an Irish Baptist minister. He was known as an author, pastor-teacher and theologian.

== Life ==
Carson studied in Glasgow and was ordained as a minister in the Presbyterian Church in Ireland in Tobermore, County Londonderry in 1798. After several years he left the Presbyterian Church in Ireland and published Reasons for Separating from the General Synod of Ulster (Edinburgh, 1804) as justification of his action, where he stated:

Shall I then submit to be cooped up in a corner and restrained by human fetters from lending a hand to rescue my brethren from the pit of destruction?

Members of his former church followed him and, for 10 years, he preached in barns or the open air until a stone church was built for him in 1814. In the early part of his independent career, while studying the New Testament in order to confute the Baptists, he became a Baptist himself, and advocated their views with the exception of close communion.

== Works ==
Carson's Baptism in Its Mode and Subjects Considered (Edinburgh, 1831; enlarged ed., 1844) is a Baptist classic. His other writings were numerous and treat topics of Bible interpretation, philosophy, and doctrinal and practical theology. His collected works were published in six volumes in Dublin between 1847 and 1864.

== Beliefs ==
Alexander Carson held to a Sandemanian view of faith. He took high offence at James MacKnight's view of faith, which included a desire to know and do the will of God. Instead, Carson presented a simplistic definition of faith as just belief, writing in his works that the belief of the gospel is only believing that the sacrifice of Jesus is sufficient to all who receive it. Thus, his view of faith did not include any affections towards God.

== See also ==
- Association of Baptist Churches in Ireland
- Irish Baptist Association
