= Hugh D. Brown =

Irish Baptist pastor

Hugh Dunlop Brown MA BL, (1858 – 24 April 1918) was an Irish author and pastor-teacher of Harcourt Street Baptist Church in Dublin. He was President of the Irish Baptist Association in 1887.

He was the son of Marianne Brown and Hugh Brown Senior, the founder of the Brown Thomas establishment in Dublin. A graduate of Trinity College, Dublin where he obtained a MA, he later qualified as a barrister.

Although his parents belonged to the Church of Ireland, Brown became a Baptist preacher and served at the Harcourt Street Baptist Church from 1887 to 1914.

In 1892 he founded the Irish Baptist Training Institute at 16 Harcourt Street in Dublin, with just five students, beside the Harcourt Street Baptist Church where he preached, which later became the Irish Baptist College, which is now based outside Lisburn.

He also co-founded Limerick Baptist Church in 1895.

Brown died in Dublin on 24 April 1918, and is buried in Mount Jerome Cemetery, Dublin.

== Publications ==
His works included;

- Irish Baptists on the Home Rule Bill (Irish Unionist Alliance, 1893)
- God’s witness to His Word: A study of the self-witness of the Holy Spirit to His own writings (London, Hodder and Stoughton, 1904)
- The Past and Future of Baptists in Ireland 44 page booklet (Dublin, 1914)
- Our Happy Dead, Where are they? Shall We Know them? An Inquiry Into the Teaching of Holy Scripture (1916)

== See also ==
- Association of Baptist Churches in Ireland
- Irish Baptist Association
- Irish Baptist College
