= Mary Galway =

Irish trade unionist and suffragist (1864 - 1928)

- Born: 1864; County Down
- Died: September 26, 1928 (aged 63–64); Belfast
- Known for: Trade unionism

Mary Galway (1864 – 26 September 1928), was an Irish trade unionist and suffragist. She was President of the Textile Operatives Society and she and another woman were exceptionally sent to national conference fifteen years before another woman was chosen.

== Life ==
Mary Galway was born in 1864 near Moira in County Down. She was one of at least five girls born to the family. They moved to Belfast while she was young where her family's income was dependent on the linen weaving industry. Galway started working when she was 11 years old and joined the Textile Operatives Society of Ireland. By 1898 she was elected to the executive of Belfast Trades Council and that year she represented them at the fifth annual Irish Trades Union Congress along with Lizzie Bruce. It was fifteen years before another society sent women as delegates to the congress. By 1907 Galway was president of the society and was the first woman on the Irish Trades Union Congress National Executive. Galway became the union's first woman Vice-President in 1910. Throughout she used her voice to call for women's equality and suffrage urging women to ‘agitate until they got the franchise and representation in Parliament.’ She was also a member of the Central Committee for Women’s Employment for Ulster. Galway was a regular contributor to the discussion in The Irish Citizen around wages, exploitation, class and workers’ rights.

Galway testified to parliament on a number of worker issues and was instrumental in eliminating the concept of children working half time in school and half time in work and in shortening the working week to forty-eight hours.

Before 1900 the union had had 1,000 members. By 1918 it had over 10,000. James Connolly and Galway clashed when he set up what she felt was a competing union but she continued to achieve significant goals for her members and to set up further branches around the country.
