= Association of Baptist Churches in Ireland =

Evangelical Baptist congregation in Ireland

- Logo of the Association of Baptist Churches in Ireland.
- Classification: Evangelical Christianity
- Theology: Baptist
- Governance: Congregational
- Region: Ireland
- Headquarters: Moira, Craigavon
- Origin: 1895; 131 years ago
- Congregations: 118
- Members: 8,500; Worshipers: 20,000
- Ministers: 100
- Missionaries: 100
- Missionary organization: Baptist Missions
- Aid organization: Annuity Fund; Baptist Aid; Orphan Society
- Seminaries: Irish Baptist College
- Official website: irishbaptist.org

The Association of Baptist Churches in Ireland (ABC, ABCi and ABCI) is a Baptist Christian denomination based in Ireland. The headquarters is in Moira, Craigavon.

== History ==
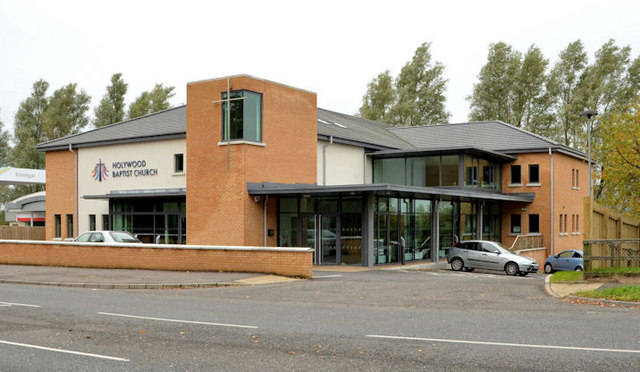
Holywood Baptist church in Belfast.

The Association has its origins in the establishment of Baptist churches in Cork (1640), Dublin (1642) and Waterford (1650). In 1725, there were 11 Baptist churches, and 9 formed the Irish Baptist Association. The Irish Baptist Association was reorganised in 1862, and was replaced by the Baptist Union of Ireland in 1895. Irish Baptists initially had a close relationship with the English Baptists. However, desire for independence caused the Irish Baptists to follow their own path and they set up the Union in 1895. The first Assembly meeting of the newly formed Union took place in May 1895 in Mountpottinger Baptist Church, Belfast with 27 churches present with two more being added to the membership in that meeting. The Union was renamed Association of Baptist Churches in Ireland in 1999, highlighting that they are an association of churches of like mind which seek to work and fellowship together. According to a census published by the association in 2023, it claimed 118 churches and 8,500 members.

== Organisation ==
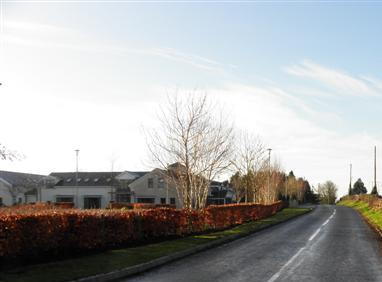
Irish Baptist College in Moira.

Departments include Baptist Women, Baptist Youth, Missions, Welfare, and Training (Irish Baptist Historical Society and Irish Baptist College). The ABC Insight is a bi-monthly magazine serving the churches. The Baptist Centre comprising the administrative offices and the Irish Baptist College is located near Moira, County Down, Northern Ireland. The association holds an annual assembly in May. The Churches Council meets during the week of the annual assembly and also annually in November. The purpose of the council is to hear reports and conduct business. Matters are handled between sessions by the executive committee elected by the churches at the May Churches Council meeting.

== Schools ==
Promotes training among the churches and operates the Irish Baptist College which seeks to train men and women for pastoral and necessary services, such as evangelism, as well as some amount of Baptist theology.

== Caring Ministries ==
By means of the Orphan Society, Annuity Fund and Baptist Aid provides support for those in need.

== Doctrines/Beliefs ==
The ABCI holds conservative theological views on many issues, including total biblical inerrancy and verbal plenary biblical inspiration, as well as traditional ECT views of hell and eternal security. They also hold to a real Adam and Eve as historical human beings, and total depravity resulting from Adam's sin.

They hold to memorialism at organisation level, in which both the communion bread and communion wine or grape juice are given to validly baptised believers. Believer's baptism by immersion is a core tenet of the ABCI.

Traditional views found in protestantism are prominent in the ABCI, as with other Baptist groups, such as Sola Scriptura and Sola Fide.

== Members ==
Association members are referred to as Irish Baptists, however some choose to refer to themselves as Association Baptists to distinguish them from other Baptists.

- Hugh D. Brown, an author, pastor-teacher in Dublin, politician in the Irish Unionist Alliance, President of the Irish Baptist Association and theologian.
- Alexander Carson, author of Baptism in its Mode and Subjects, pastor-teacher and theologian.
- William Young Fullerton
- Hamilton Moore

== See also ==
- Irish Baptist College
- Christianity in Ireland
- Baptists
