= Henrietta Gayer =

Irish Methodist leader (died 1814)

- Born: married in 1772
- Died: 25 March 1814
- Occupations: Socialite and evangelist
- Known for: Methodist advocate in Lisburne
- Spouse: Edward Gayer
- Relatives: Agnes Smythe (niece)

Henrietta Gayer born Henrietta Jones (1700s – 25 March 1814) was a Methodist leader and evangelist in Lisburn, Ireland (modern-day Northern Ireland). She hosted Methodist meetings in her house and sponsored the building of the first Methodist chapel in Lisburn.

== Life ==
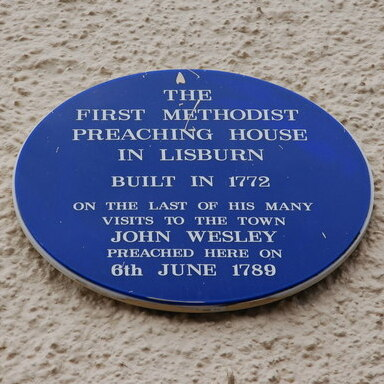
Commemorative plaque on the chapel that she and John Johnson had built

Gayer's early life is sketchy but it is known that her father was Valentine Jones of Lisburn. She comes to notice when she married Edward Gayer of Derryaghy in 1772. Her husband was also from the Lisburn area and he was the clerk to the Irish House of Lords. She became single minded in her religious pursuits. She was advised to get more involved with "fashionable amusements" by a member of the clergy and this resulted in her reading from a prayer book in between dances during a ball at Dublin Castle.

In the 1760s Methodism had gained a following in her area of Ireland. Gayer resisted participating, as her husband was opposed to the new religious movement, but she accepted an invitation from Jane Cumberland to come to her house where there was a class meeting of Methodists. Gayer brought along her daughter who was thirteen and they both decided to join the Methodist society. Her husband met John Wesley in 1773 when he preached at Derryaghy and he was impressed by him. The Gayer family set aside a room in their house where visiting preachers could stay. They called this room "the Prophet's Chamber".

Gayer and a preacher named John Johnston had led the way for a Methodist chapel to be opened in Lisburn in 1772 and Gayer attracted converts including her niece Agnes Smyth in 1775. Smythe was to convince her husband Edward, a curate, that he too should become a Methodist.

John Wesley stayed at the Gayer home in Derryaghy when he became ill during his visit to Lisburn in June 1775.

Agnes Smythe's husband lost his living as a curate in 1776.

Gayer's husband died in 1799.

== Death and legacy ==
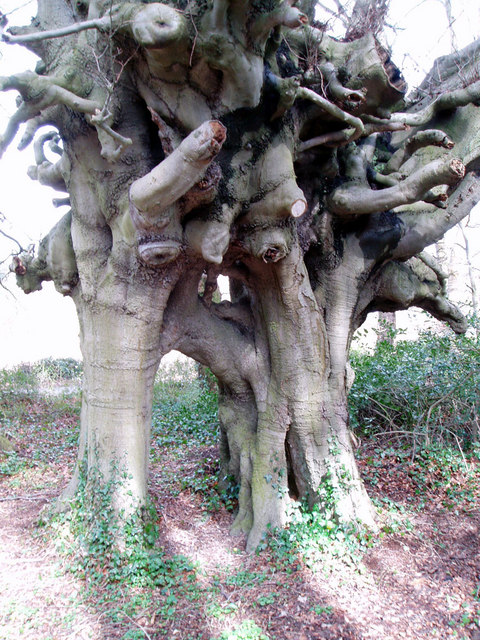
John Wesley's beech trees, Lambeg, Co. Down

Gayer continued to advocate for the Methodist cause and to give whatever she could to worthy causes. As a result, when she died in 1814 she left no bequests having successfully given all of her money away. The later enlarged chapel still stands as the "Christian Workers’ Union Hall" and the congregation operates in Lisburn at a building in Seymour Street. Agnes Smyth went on to be a curate. Gayer's daughter Mary and her husband Richard Wolfenden were hosts to John Wesley when he visited in June 1787. Wesley twisted together two beech samplings in their garden to illustrate the bond he hoped that could be made between the Methodists and the Irish Church. An agreement like this was made in 2002. It was signed under the now two intertwined beech trees in memory of Wesley's hope.

== See also ==
- List of Methodists
- Methodist Church in Ireland
