= Anne Lutton =

- Born: 16 December 1791; Moira
- Died: 22 August 1881 (aged 89); Bristol
- Occupation: preacher

Anne Lutton (16 December 1791 – 22 August 1881) was an Irish-born United Kingdom Wesleyan Methodist preacher.

== Life ==
Lutton was born in Moira in County Down in 1791. She was the last child of a large family and although she never went to school she learnt a wide range of languages from Latin and Greek to Persian and Samaritan. Her father was a linguist too.

She was a loyal follower of established religion but she was intrigued by Methodism and followed this denomination in addition to her own. She recorded her conversion as 14 April 1815. She became a leader within the Methodists although she was confirmed at a Church of Ireland ceremony. The early Methodists had encouraged women preachers. The Methodist leader John Wesley had reassured another Irish preacher, Alice Cambridge, that she should follow her heart if she was inclined to preach, but she should not preach near a male preacher as she may take some of his audience, but the church changed their policy in 1803. However they did allow women to preach to other women. Before 1831, she preached at 27 northern Irish locations on nearly 160 occasions starting in 1818. In 1829 she published Poems on Moral and Religious Subjects. It was reported that men dressed as women so that they could join the large groups who went to hear her revivalist enthusiasm.

== Bristol ==
From 1832 she was an increasingly frequent visitor to Bristol in the west of England. After five years to leading classes there she left Ireland behind her. She continued to write letters and her prose and poetry were published. She lost her sight in 1863.

Lutton died in 1881 in her adopted home at 12 Cotham Road in Bristol.
