= Hamilton Moore (theologian) =

British theologian

- Citizenship: United Kingdom
- Scientific career
- Fields: Theologian
- Institutions: Irish Baptist College

Hamilton Moore is a Baptist theologian and lecturer.

Moore holds a Bachelor of Divinity, a Master of Theology, and a PhD. In 1990, Moore became principal and New Testament tutor at the Irish Baptist College in Lisburn, Northern Ireland. He is also an adjunct professor at Emanuel University in Oradea, Romania. Prior to that, he worked in pastoral and evangelistic ministry from 1968.

== See also ==
- Irish Baptist College
- Association of Baptist Churches in Ireland

Educational offices
New title	Principal of the Irish Baptist College; 1990–2010	Succeeded by Edwin Ewart
