= Bishops' Selection Conference =

In the Church of Ireland, the Bishops' Selection Conference is an annual panel of church members, representing both clergy and laity, who assess candidates offering themselves for consideration for training for the ordained ministry.

The Selection Panel is composed of a bishop, a priest, two members of the laity, and a representative of the Church of Ireland Theological College.

Candidates can be men or women from any of the dioceses in the Church of Ireland, seeking either to enter stipendiary ministry or non-stipendary ministry (NSM).

Prospective candidates generally must be a member of their diocese's Fellowship of Vocation for at least one year before their Bishop will consider putting them forward for the Selection Conference, who does so on the recommendation of their Diocesan Director of Ordinands (DDO) and after satisfactory performance at psychological and academic testing at a Pre-Selection Conference, usually held in January.

Interview questions are tailored for each candidate but follow general themes: spirituality, understanding of vocation, vision and leadership, etc.

After interviewing each candidate, the Selection Panel can make one of four recommendations to his or her Bishop:

1. Recommended for training
2. Conditional recommendation for training
3. Not recommended for training
4. Defer the decision until the following year

The Bishops are not bound by the recommendations of the Selection Conference.

Candidates recommended for training may commence theological study within three years of their acceptance. Candidates not recommended for training generally must wait for two years before re-applying (in which case the new Selection Panel is not informed of their previous application).

The current Chairman of the Selection Conference is the Right Reverend Ken Clarke (Bishop of Kilmore), and its Secretary is Karen Seaman.

== Sources ==
Guide to Selection Conferences
Annual Report 2004
Annual Report 2002
