= Irish Baptist College =

Irish religious college

- Former name: Irish Baptist Training Institute
- Motto: Domine Sequor (Latin)
- Motto in English: Lord I Follow
- Type: Bible college
- Established: 4 October 1892
- Founder: Hugh D. Brown
- Religious affiliation: Association of Baptist Churches in Ireland
- Academic affiliations: Queen's University Belfast; University of Wales, Lampeter; University of Chester
- Principal: Edwin Ewart
- Director: Davy Ellison
- Faculty: 10
- Administrative staff: 5
- Location: Baptist Theological Centre, The Baptist Centre, Moira, Craigavon, BT67 0HG, Northern Ireland, United Kingdom; 54.479364°N 6.192942°W
- Campus: Rural Campus university
- Website: irishbaptistcollege.co.uk

The Irish Baptist College (IBC) is a Baptist theological college in Moira, Craigavon, Northern Ireland. It is affiliated with the Association of Baptist Churches in Ireland. It is part of the Baptist Theological Centre which is located in the Baptist Centre and is shared with ABC. IBC is accredited and reached Premier College Status by the Accreditation Service for International Colleges (ASIC). The Quality Assurance Agency for Higher Education of England and Wales, review the IBC for quality and standards.

== History ==
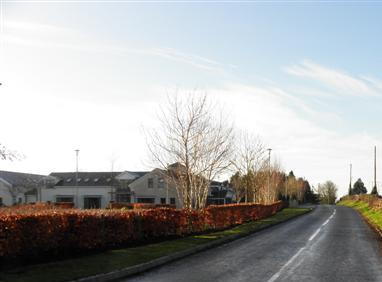
Irish Baptist College in Moira.

IBC was founded as the Irish Baptist Training Institute, on 4 October 1892 in No. 16 Harcourt St., Dublin, now Republic of Ireland, by Hugh D. Brown, pastor of the neighbouring Harcourt St. Baptist Church, and Ambrose U.G. Bury, MA, was appointed the first principal of the IBC. Since the college was established with funding from the philanthropist J.D. Rockefeller, the building was named Rockefeller House. The college was controlled half by the Harcourt St. Church and half by the Baptist Union of Ireland. In 1916 Thomas Harold Spurgeon, MA, BD, (son of Rev. Thomas Spurgeon and grandson of Rev. Charles Spurgeon) was appointed principal. In 1940 the college moved to 42 Terenure Road in Dublin, the Harcourt St. Baptist Church had moved to Grosvenor Road, Rathmines. In 1964 the college moved to a new campus in Belfast in Northern Ireland, and control of the college was transferred to the Baptist Association. Following Spurgeon's retirement 1963, David P. Kingdon was appointed principal serving until 1974, when he was succeeded by Dr. Ivor Oakley who served until 1988, Norman Shields served as acting principal following Dr. Oakley's departure. In 1990 Dr. Hamilton Moore became principal serving until 2009 when Edwin Ewart was elected principal. In college accept its first female students in 1964.

On 10 May 2003 the college moved into the purpose-built Baptist Theological Centre in the Baptist Centre located outside Lisburn in Moira in County Antrim. A new library (John B. Craig Library) and study area were added in 2010, it is named after Pastor John B. Craig who trained in the IBC in Dublin, before serving in Belfast before emigrating to Canada.

A Women's Discipleship Course is run at the Baptist Centre in association with the Irish Baptist College. The Irish Baptist Historical Society is an extension of the Irish Baptist College.

The IBC became a constituent college of the Institute of Theology at Queen's University Belfast (QUB) in 1977, offering MTh and PhD degrees. In 2003 the IBC began offering undergraduate degrees and an MA validated by the University of Wales, Lampeter (UoW), which ceased its international partnerships programmes in 2010. In 2010 the IBC commenced its partnership with the University of Chester validating Undergraduate and Postgraduate degrees. It was announced in 2019 that QUB was closing the Institute of Theology, with all existing students to have completed their programmes by 2023. In 2023, Jonathan McClaughlin replaced Edwin Ewart as principal of the college.

== Campus ==
IBC is part of the Baptist Theological Centre which is located in the Baptist Centre and is shared with ABC. The campus is in a rural area near to the M1 motorway and within the boundaries of the City of Lisburn. IBC is a campus university.

== Organisation ==
The Principal of the college is Edwin Ewart, since 2010. The IBC is administered by a management committee which reports to the Association of Baptist Churches in Ireland.

== Courses ==
IBC offers degrees accredited by the University of Chester, University of Wales, Lampeter, and IBC awards. Some courses were validated by Spurgeon's College in London and were affected by the closure of that college in July 2025.

== See also ==
- Association of Baptist Churches in Ireland
- Irish Baptist College Library
- Baptist Centre
- Queen's University Belfast
- University of Chester
- University of Wales, Lampeter
