= Jochem Douma =

Dutch theologian and ethicist

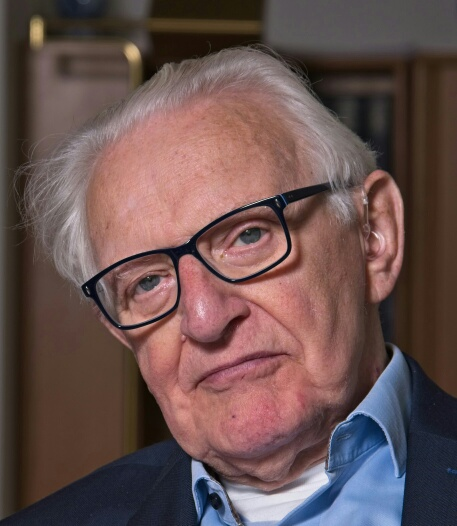
Jochem Douma

Jochem Douma (23 November 1931 – 7 November 2020) was a Dutch theologian and ethicist. He was ordained in the Reformed Churches in the Netherlands (Liberated), having studied at its Theological College in Kampen and at the University of Amsterdam. He served as a pastor before being appointed as Professor of Ethics at Kampen in 1970, where he served until his retirement in 1997.

Douma wrote a fifteen-volume series called Ethical Reflections, as well as a series of biblical commentaries. Geoff Thomas noted in 1999 that he was best known in Britain for his friendly interaction with Reformed Baptists.

In 2014 Douma left the Liberated churches to join the Reformed Churches in the Netherlands (Restored).
