= Agnes Smyth =

- Born: Lisburn, Northern Ireland
- Died: 22 May 1783; Bath, Somerset
- Occupation: Preacher
- Spouse: Edward Smyth

Agnes Smyth or Agnes Higginson (c, 1755 – 22 May 1783) was an Irish and English (fl. 1764–1790) Methodist preacher.

== Life ==
Smyth was born in Lisburn with a family name of Higginson in about 1755. When she was fifteen she married the preacher Edward Smyth.

Her aunt, Henrietta Gayer, was a leading Methodist in the area and she attracted many to the movement including Agnes Smythe. The Methodist leader John Wesley visited Lisburne and stayed at the Gayer's home in 1775 where he recovered from a grave illness. That year Smythe became a Methodist and she convinced her husband, who was a curate in Ballyculter, of this approach to Christianity. Agnes was enthusiastic and she abandoned fancy dresses and frivolity and she was determined to preach whenever the opportunity arose.

John Wesley had reassured another Irish preacher, Alice Cambridge, that she should follow her heart if she was inclined to preach, but she should not preach near a male preacher as she may take some of his audience. Her husband's patron Lord Bangor objected to their approach and accused Edward of incorrect teaching. Her husband was found not guilty in court but nevertheless they lost their living in 1776 and the following year Edward's license to preach was taken away.

Edward was invited to preach by John Wesley in 1782 and after returning from recovering from an illness in Ireland, Agnes also returned to work with the English Methodists. Agnes served as a curate in London in 1782. Smyth died the following year in Bath in 1783.

In 1790 "An Extract of the Life, Death and spiritual experience of Mrs A. Smyth (written by herself)" was published.
