= William Losee =

American minister

William Losee (30 June 1757 – 16 October 1832) was a Methodist minister, who acted as a circuit rider in the United States and Upper Canada.

== Biography ==
Although not the first Methodist to preach in what was then the single British colony of Quebec, William Losee was the first to be officially appointed by the New York Conference to preach in Quebec (in the region known as Upper Canada after 1791). He had previously worked the Champlain circuit in New York. He was appointed by Elder Garrettson to Lower Canada with wide latitude in how to conduct his preaching. Both Losee's relatives in the area and his favourable feelings toward the British Government contributed to his appointment. His first conversion was one of these relatives, Joshua Losee. There were very few ministers in The Canadas at this time, William Case would later recall that he knew of only four, but guessed there might have been as many as six. Losee's preaching resulted in immediate conversions in what was then largely wilderness regions punctuated by tiny villages and isolated cabins. An early source reports that Losee was famous for vehement preaching and imploring God to smite sinners. On one occasion, while being heckled during a religious meeting, Losee pointed at the heckler and proclaimed "Smite him, my God!" The man, whose name is reported to have been Joseph Brouse, fell to the ground writhing in agony only to later rise and repent of his sins.

In 1791, Losee returned to Upper Canada to ride the Kingston (or Cataraqui) circuit. The circuit included the village of Kingston and settlement within about 100 km. Losee set up classes in Augusta, Niagara, Adolphustown, Earnestown and Fredericksburg. One hundred sixty five Methodists were count in his circuit that year. In 1792, the circuit was divided into two and Losee was returned by the New York Conference with a second Methodist circuit rider, Darius Dunham. Dunham took over the Cataraqui circuit and Losee assumed the new Oswegotchie circuit. It would seem, however, that Losee had fallen deeply in love with a woman living on the Cataraqui circuit. Dunham fell in love with the same woman, Elizabeth Detlor of Fredericksburg. She chose Dunham and Losee almost lost his sanity as a result. He quietly resigned from the ministry, returned to New York, and spent the rest of his life working a trade.
