= Hamilton Moore (rugby union) =

Rugby union player from Northern Ireland

- Born: 12 June 1856 Connor, County Antrim, Ireland
- Died: 16 August 1927 (aged 71) Newmilns, Ayrshire, Scotland

Rugby union career
- Position: Fullback
International career
Years	Team	Apps	(Points)
1875–77	Ireland	2	(0)

Hamilton Moore (12 June 1856 — 16 August 1927) was an Irish international rugby union player.

Born in Connor, County Antrim, Moore was educated at the Royal Belfast Academical Institution, Queen's College Belfast and Assembly's College, the latter a theological college. He was capped twice as a fullback for Ireland during his tertiary studies, playing against England in 1875 and Scotland in 1877.

Moore was a Presbyterian minister in Glenwherry for much of the 1880s, the moved to Ayrshire and having been ordained by the Church of Scotland General Assembly was appointed minister of Loudoun Parish.

== See also ==
- List of Ireland national rugby union players
