= Alice Cambridge =

- Born: 1 January 1762; Bandon, County Cork
- Died: 1 January 1829 (aged 67); Nenagh
- Known for: Preaching

Alice Cambridge (1 January 1762 – 1 January 1829) was an early Irish Methodist preacher.

== Life ==
Cambridge was born in Bandon in County Cork on New Years Day 1762. Her mother was a Presbyterian and her father was a member of the Church of Ireland. Cambridge was taken to her mother's church but resolved as she became older to join the Methodists in Bandon. She wanted to be a preacher and she abandoned a boyfriend to concentrate on evangelism. It was a novelty to hear a woman preaching, although Agnes Smyth had already done some Methodist preaching in Ireland. Cambridge still attracted interest as she visited towns in the county of Munster. Some thought women preaching was against scripture and in 1791 she wrote to John Wesley. Wesley reassured her that she should follow her heart if she was inclined to preach, but she should not preach near a male preacher as she may take some of his audience.

After Wesley died, the Methodist church decided that it did not support women preaching. In July 1802 the Methodist conference passed a resolution that any women preaching or merely exhort should be ejected from the church. Her supporters suggested that she found her own church but she kept faith with the Methodists despite being excluded from any Methodist building. In 1811 the conference decided to readmit her to the Methodists even though she had never ceased preaching. She had worked in shops in Dublin and Cork, but in 1813 she decided to preach full-time. She toured the country and occasionally spoke to thousands as in Lurgan in 1816.

By 1827 she was exhausted by preaching and stopped travelling. She died on her birthday in Nenagh and was buried there in 1829.
