= Moira, County Down =

Town in Northern Ireland

Coordinates: 54.480°N 6.232°W

Moira: Irish: Maigh Rath
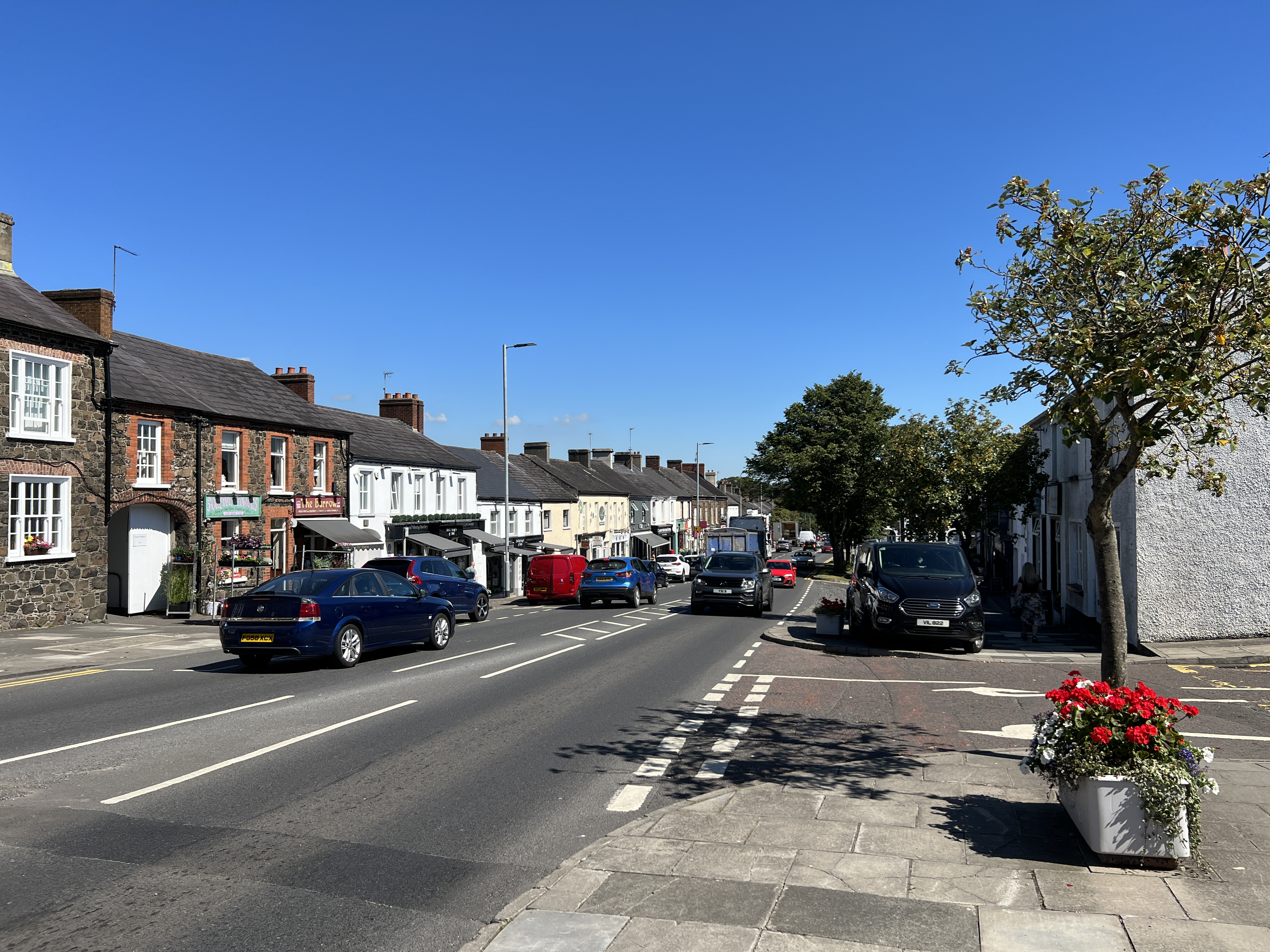
- Part of Main Street, Moira, August 2022

- Location within County Down
- Population: 4,879 (2021 census)
- District: Lisburn and Castlereagh
- County: County Down
- Country: Northern Ireland
- Sovereign state: United Kingdom
- Post town: CRAIGAVON
- Postcode district: BT67
- Dialling code: 028
- UK Parliament: Lagan Valley
- NI Assembly: Lagan Valley

Moira (from Irish Maigh Rath, meaning 'plain of the streams or wheels') is a town and civil parish in County Down, Northern Ireland. It is in the northwest of the county, near the border with counties Antrim and Armagh. The M1 motorway and Belfast–Dublin railway line are nearby. The population was 4,879 at the 2021 census.

== History ==
=== Toponymy ===
The etymology of Moira is somewhat uncertain. It seems to be an anglicisation of the Irish Maigh Rath, which may mean either 'plain of the wheels' or 'plain of the ringforts'. Another Irish form of the name is Mag Rath. The change most probably occurred during or before the Plantation of Ulster. Regardless Moira has now evolved to become both the official name and the one in everyday use.

=== Prehistory to 1800 ===
Moira has been a settlement for at least 1,500 years. For the period it consisted most probably only of small dwellings surrounded by several earthen ringforts. Evidence of three such forts still remain. The best known of these is the so-called "Rough Fort", situated on the Old Kilmore Road. However, the remains of "Pretty Mary's Fort" exist behind the Waringfield residential area. Finally evidence of a third ringfort can be found near Claremont.

In fact the supposed ring fort in Moira is actually a henge dating back thousands of years. see the book "Finding Footprints" by David McFarland.

The existence of these primitive defences, coupled with the good-view afforded from the top of Moira hill, made the settlement strategically valuable. Proximity to Lough Neagh enhanced this value. Accordingly, during the repeated power struggles of the first millennium the area was often fought over, and eventually witnessed the largest battle in the history of Ireland when three tribal kings contested the area to determine supremacy in Ulster and beyond. This was the Battle of Moira. Its impact on Moira is still felt; two townlands still bear battle names, Aughnafosker (meaning field of slaughter) and Carnalbanagh (meaning the Scotsman's grave). After the battle a bishop by the name of Ronan Finn (who was later canonized) was alleged to have created a monastery in the area.

The medieval period itself remains shrouded in mystery. It is known that the town and its hinterland were under the control of the O'Lavery Clan for a considerable period. They were Catholic families who held sway in large parts of Armagh. Indeed, prior to the Nine Years War Ulster was the most gaelic part of Ireland. There were few towns, few roads and much of the country was thickly wooded. However the subjugation of Ulster by the victorious armies of Elizabeth I greatly reduced the clout of Gaelic hierarchs, the O'Laverys included. But it was their participation in the Irish Rebellion of 1641 doomed their dominance. The Dublin Castle administration crushed the rebellion and confiscated vast amounts of Irish Catholic-owned property, in Moira as in the rest of Ireland. As a direct result of this the Protestant plantations of Ulster (which began in 1606) were accelerated.

==== Arrival of the Rawdon family ====
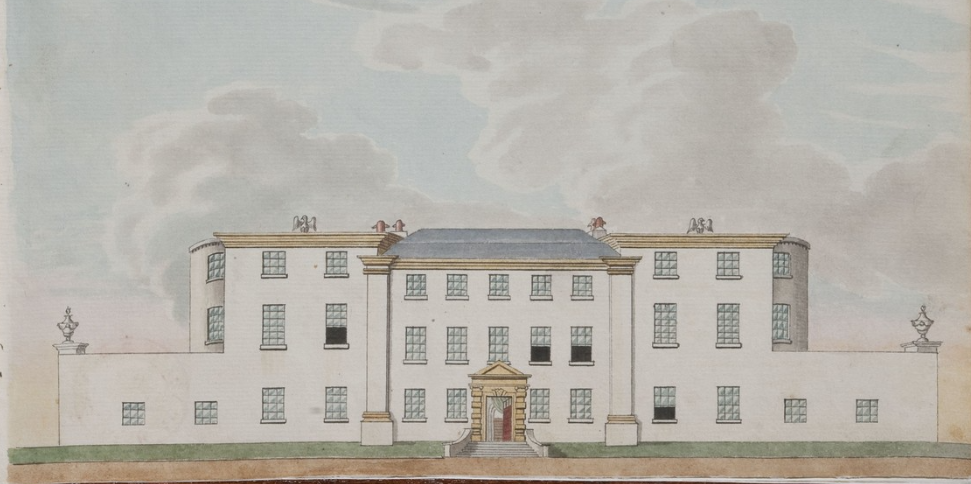
Moira Castle, County Down in 1799 by Gabriel Beranger.

In 1631, Major George Rawdon, a wealthy man from the village of Rawdon, Yorkshire, settled in Moira. During the Irish Rebellion of 1641, Rawdon led 200 English troops to victory over an Irish army under Sir Phelim O'Neill, re-securing Moira and its environs for the Crown. In 1651 a Major de Burgh purchased a small estate and built a brick house in Moira. This house, the forerunner of Moira Castle, was subsequently purchased by Rawdon. Following the defeat of the rebellion, Rawdon subsequently purchased vast amounts of land in the area (most probably financed by confiscations from rebels), and was said to have developed it greatly. In 1665 he was created a baronet by Charles II. At some point in his life he became a Member of Parliament. He was nicknamed the 'Great Highwayman' for his development of roads infrastructure in and around Moira. Rawdon was succeeded in his title by his son Arthur.

==== Later Rawdon Baronets ====
Sir Arthur (who would also become an Irish MP) became a General in the armies of King William III during the Williamite War in Ireland. He was quickly besieged in Derry, but managed to escape. After the war, with the Protestant Ascendancy of which he was a part yet again restored, Sir Arthur (who had presumably profited greatly from the war) returned to Moira. Having inherited the brick manor house his father had purchased he decided to expand it greatly, and it became one of the largest residences in the whole island, to be called Moira Castle. The castle, which in fact was a mansion, was also accompanied by vast gardens. These gardens became world-famous. In 1690 Sir Arthur utilised his friendship with fellow Down-born botanist Sir Hans Sloane, and acquired from him the seeds of 400 exotic plants, and instructions in how to grow them. To fit his ends Sir Arthur also constructed in Moira the first hothouse in Europe.

The subsequent baronets maintained the gardens (though the hothouse did not survive) for generations. In 1723 Sir John Rawdon, 3rd Baronet helped fund the construction of the Anglican Moira Parish Church, dedicated to St. John.

==== The Lords Rawdon ====
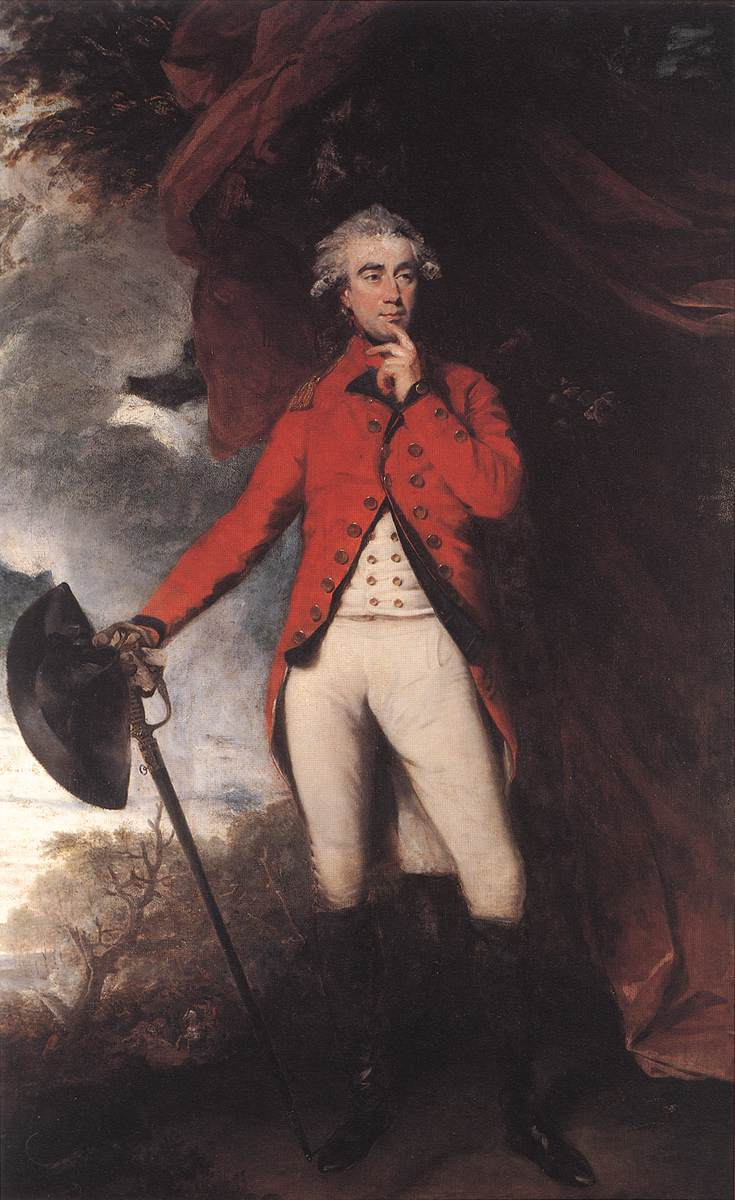
Portrait of Lord Moira (Sir Joshua Reynolds, 1790)

In 1750 Sir John Rawdon, 4th Baronet was raised to the peerage by George II as the Baron Rawdon of Moira. He subsequently flirted with Methodism, and invited John Wesley to speak at Moira Church. This caused a major religious rift in the town. And though Wesley did speak, he did so from the grounds of Moira Castle, not the church for which the Rawdons had largely paid. He was also granted a higher title in 1762 by George III, when he was made Earl of Moira.

In addition to flirting with Methodism, Lord Rawdon also flirted with Irish self-government (albeit under the Ascendancy), opposing the efforts of Prime Minister William Pitt the Younger to forge closer Anglo-Irish links in the first decade of his ministry. His death on 20 June 1793 was significant in Moira history, in that it marked the largest funeral in the history of Ireland (a record now held by the attendance at the funeral of Michael Collins), a testament to his extensive political connections. Over four hundred carriages were in procession. This Lord Rawdon is buried in the family crypt in the church.

Upon his death his son Francis Rawdon-Hastings became the Earl of Moira. A respected general and politician with significant influence in London, his time as head of the family was nevertheless negative for the town of Moira, which had risen greatly in prestige as a result of his predecessors. He neglected the gardens in the Moira estate, which subsequently declined into decay. He also spent the vast majority of his time in England.

=== Moira 1800–present ===
The 2nd Earl was raised to a yet-higher rank of the peerage in 1816, when he was created Marquess of Hastings, subordinating the Moira title.

Lord Hastings was the last member of the Rawdon family to reside in Moira Castle (which he had always used as a secondary residence in any case). In 1805 he sold it to Sir Robert Bateson, 1st Baronet, who also did not use it as a primary residence. The status of Moira thus declined considerably. The Rawdons' legacy lingered, however, with several streets and housing developments bearing their name centuries later. The Acts of Union had reduced the power of the Ascendency, and Moira was now directly governed by London instead of Dublin. In addition, the Great Reform Act had reduced the ability of landowners in general and lords in particular to control Moira.

Moira itself continued to develop during this period. A canal was built to the north (which became the boundary between Counties Antrim and Down), and a Market Hall completed at the expense of the Bateson family in about 1810. It was considered to have marked the completion of the village. In 1841 Moira railway station was completed, and is now the oldest such structure on the island of Ireland. Moira Castle itself was vacated by the Batesons, and was demolished during the Victorian Era. A few gate stumps remain, as does some stepping for the famous gardens, and the dug-out cellar.

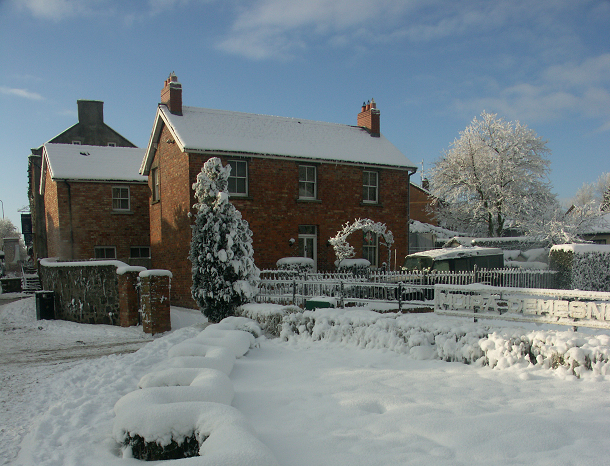
Entrance to Moira Demesne

During the Second World War the grounds of Moira Demesne (as the Castle had become known) were used by the British Army as a medical centre.

In the summer of 2018, a prolonged dry spell revealed what appeared to be foundations beneath the lawns of the demesne. In May 2019 the local council commissioned an archaeological dig by members from the Centre for Archaeological Fieldwork and Archaeology at Queen's University Belfast. For two weeks, assisted by community volunteers, they explored several trenches and found some fascinating artefacts of life in the 17th and 18th centuries.

==== 1998 bombing ====
Moira remained relatively uneventful for most of the 20th century, but did not escape The Troubles. On 20 February 1998 dissident republicans planted a 500 pounds (230 kg) car bomb, which exploded outside the police station, injuring 11 people. The bomb was intended to kill Royal Ulster Constabulary officers during a shift change. The blast was so loud that it could be heard fully twenty miles (32 km) away in Belfast. The bomb caused extensive damage, resulting in the police station and several nearby buildings having to be rebuilt. The bombing also threatened to derail the peace process at the time.

==== 21st century ====
The present village is primarily a dormitory settlement for commuters into Belfast, Lisburn, and Craigavon.

On 4 January 2019, it was announced that Frances and Patrick Connolly, a local couple in Moira, had won £115 million in the EuroMillions lottery, making them the UK's fourth-biggest lottery winners. The couple, who won precisely £114,969,775.70, told the Belfast Telegraph: "This is a massive sum of money and we want it to have a huge impact on the lives of other people we know and love as well as on our future too. This win gives us the chance to really make a difference for our family and friends".

== Government and politics ==
Moira is at the very edge of the boundaries of the City of Lisburn, and is therefore subject to the local government authority of Lisburn and Castlereagh City Council. Both the overall council and the electoral area (Killultagh) for Moira are dominated by unionist parties. During the 2011 council elections the members elected for Killultagh were, in order of preference, as follows:

- Thomas Beckett - Democratic Unionist Party (DUP)
- Jim Tinsley - Democratic Unionist Party (DUP)
- Pat Catney - Social Democratic and Labour Party (SDLP)
- Jim Dillon - Ulster Unionist Party (UUP)
- John Palmer - Democratic Unionist Party (DUP)

Following the 2014 Local Government Elections Moira formed part of the Downshire West (District Electoral Area) of Lisburn and Castlereagh City Council. The following councillors were elected in 2023:

- Owen Gawith - Alliance Party (AP)
- Gretta Thompson - Alliance Party (AP)
- Alan Martin - Ulster Unionist Party (UUP)
- Caleb McCready - Democratic Unionist Party (DUP)
- Allan Ewart- Democratic Unionist Party (DUP)

At a national level Moira is part of the Lagan Valley constituency. In the 2024 election Sorcha Eastwood (AP) was elected as MP. At a provincial level the identically named and districted Lagan Valley includes Moira. In 2022, this multi-member constituency elected two (DUP), two (AP) and one (UUP) MLAs.

== Demography ==
Historical figures
Year	Population	% Change
1971	853	-
1981	1,453	40.7%
1991	2,772	47.6%
2001	3,682	32.8%
2011	4,591	24.7%
2021	4,891	6.5%

The population of Moira at the 2021 census was 4,891 people. Their demographic characteristics were as follows:

- 18.3% were aged under 16 years;
- 63.9% were aged 16-65 years
- 17.7% were aged 66 and over.
- 48.4% of the population were male and 51.6% were female;
- 18.0% were from a Catholic community background;
- 54.1% were from a Protestant and Other Christian (including Christian related) community background;
- 1.2% were from an Other religion background
- 26.7% were No religion/Religion not stated

On Census Day 2011 there were 1,739 households in Moira. Statistics relating to Moira households include:

- average household size was 2.6 persons per household;
- 5.2% were lone-parent households with dependent children.

== Transport ==
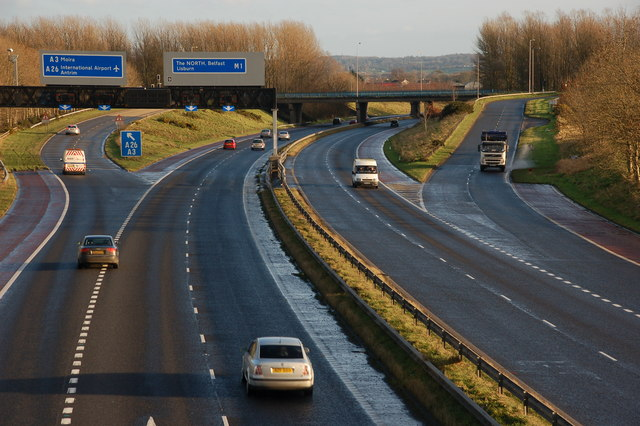
The M1 heading south at Moira Roundabout

Moira is well located in terms of infrastructure. It is served by Moira railway station, which is a stop along the Newry to Bangor line. The station was originally built by the Ulster Railway, which ran beyond Portadown and went to Armagh. It is also located conveniently close to the M1 motorway, with Moira Roundabout serving as a major junction. The proximity of Moira to both Belfast and Lisburn has meant that it has become something of a dormitory town in recent decades. Moira is also situated directly along the main road to Lurgan, which creates considerable traffic jams, particularly during rush hour. The 51 bus service runs from Portadown to Belfast regularly, with several stops in the town.

Moira is located approximately twenty miles from Belfast International Airport.

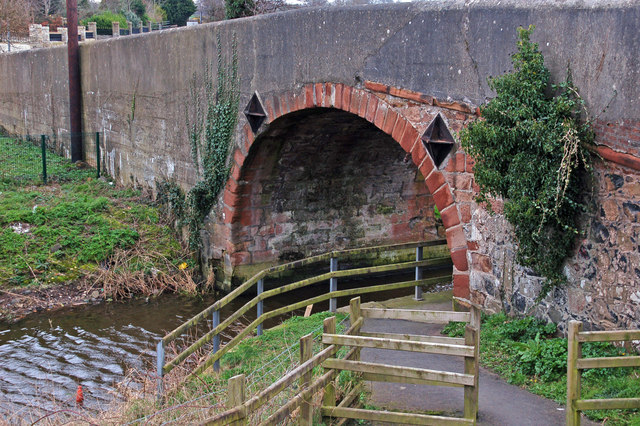
Station Road Moira with the Lagan Canal facing towards Lough Neagh.

== Other Services and Activities ==
=== Commerce ===
The village primarily exists as a commuter town, however, such jobs as there are tend to be in the services sector, with much replication. Moira is also famed for McCartney's of Moira, a 140-year-old family butchers. The firm has repeatedly won national awards for food, including the Northern Irish and National Sausage Competition. In 2011 they also became Great Taste Awards 2011 Supreme Champion, among other accolades.

Moira and specifically The Moira Drive Thru and Internet Cafe was also the filming location for Channel 4's award-winning Facejacker comedy program which had over 3,000,000 viewers.

=== Education ===
Moira Primary School, reopened by The Princess Royal, and Rowandale Integrated Primary School provide education for the first two key stages. Moira has no secondary education, with most children commuting into Lurgan, Lisburn or Belfast to attend schools such as Friends', Wallace, RBAI, Hunterhouse, Lurgan Junior High School, St. Michael's Grammar School,(Lurgan), Lismore College; St. Patrick's Grammar School, Armagh; St Colman's College, Newry; St. Patrick's Academy, Lisburn and Rathmore Grammar School. Since the closure of St. Colman's PS Kilwarlin, pupils now attend a range of local primary schools including St. Patrick's PS in Magheralin.

Moira's library has been rebuilt.

=== Sport ===
Moira has two junior football clubs: Moira FC that fields several young teams that play locally, and Moira Youth FC. Moira FC, which started in the Autumn of 2009, is linked to The LOGIC Cafe, which is part of St John's Parish Church in the village. Moira Youth FC prides itself on being a community club. The club are the reigning MUYL U12 Bowl champions and currently cater for players born in 2007 and 2008. In 2019 Moira Youth FC affiliated with Premier Intermediate League club Dollingstown FC in order to develop local youth players with a view to them eventually playing senior football for Dollingstown FC and retaining local talent in the area. Moira Youth FC folded in 2021.

Moira has another football team, Moira Albion, an amateur football club who host two teams and play in the Mid-Ulster Football League. They were division 2 champions in 2002.

The Moira area is represented in Gaelic games by the St. Michael's club in Magheralin as Moira falls within the Magheralin Parish. St. Michael's play in the Down County League and their most notable player to date is George Lavery, who came from Moira and won two senior all-irelands with Down in 1960 and 1961. George played soccer for Moira Young Men's club in the 1940s and 1950s, playing in the local league before being offered a contract by Belfast Celtic.

== Namesakes ==
Due to the prevalence of the Rawdon family in British Imperial affairs, several places in the world are named after Moira, County Down, usually via the noble title. These include;

- Moira, Leicestershire, a former mining village largely built by the Rawdons.
- Moira, Ontario, an area in Canada.
- The Moira River, and by extension the Moira Lake, also in Ontario, Canada.
- Moira, New York

== Notable people ==
- Anne Lutton (1791-1881), Preacher, founder of Methodism in Moira, poet
- Thomas Bateson, 1st Baron Deramore (1819-1890), aristocrat and landowner
- Mary Galway (1864-1928), Irish trade unionist and suffragist
- Dame Mary Uprichard (born 1938), DBE - nursing, midwifery and health care activist

== See also ==
- Moira, County Down (civil parish)
- List of towns and villages in Northern Ireland
- List of localities in Northern Ireland by population
