= Demographics of Belfast =

- Population pyramid of Belfast
- Population: 345,418 (2021)

The city of Belfast is the provincial capital of Northern Ireland. The population of the Belfast Local Government District was 345,418 in 2021.

== Population ==
Population density of Belfast City Council in 2011

=== Population ===
Historical population
Year	Pop.	±% p.a.
1757	8,549	—
1782	13,105	+1.72%
1791	18,320	+3.79%
1806	22,095	+1.26%
1821	37,277	+3.55%
1831	53,287	+3.64%
1841	75,308	+3.52%
1851	97,784	+2.65%
1861	119,393	+2.02%
1871	174,412	+3.86%
1881	208,122	+1.78%
1891	255,950	+2.09%
1901	349,180	+3.15%
1911	386,947	+1.03%
1926	415,151	+0.47%
1937	438,086	+0.49%
1951	443,671	+0.09%
1961	415,856	−0.65%
1966	398,405	−0.85%
1971	362,082	−1.89%
1981	314,270	−1.41%
1991	279,237	−1.17%
2001	277,391	−0.07%
2006	267,374	−0.73%
2011	286,000	+1.36%
2021	293,298	+0.25%

The total population of Belfast Local Government District was 345,418 in 2021, an increase of 3.5%.

==== Sex ====
In 2021, 51% of the population was female while 49% was male.

=== Age ===
Population pyramid of Belfast in 2021

The age demographics of Belfast is different to the rest of the constituent country, 18% were aged 0 to 14, 37% aged 15 to 39, 30% aged 40 to 64 and 15% aged 65 and above.

== Religion ==
Religious Upbringing

Percentage Catholic or brought up Catholic in 2011

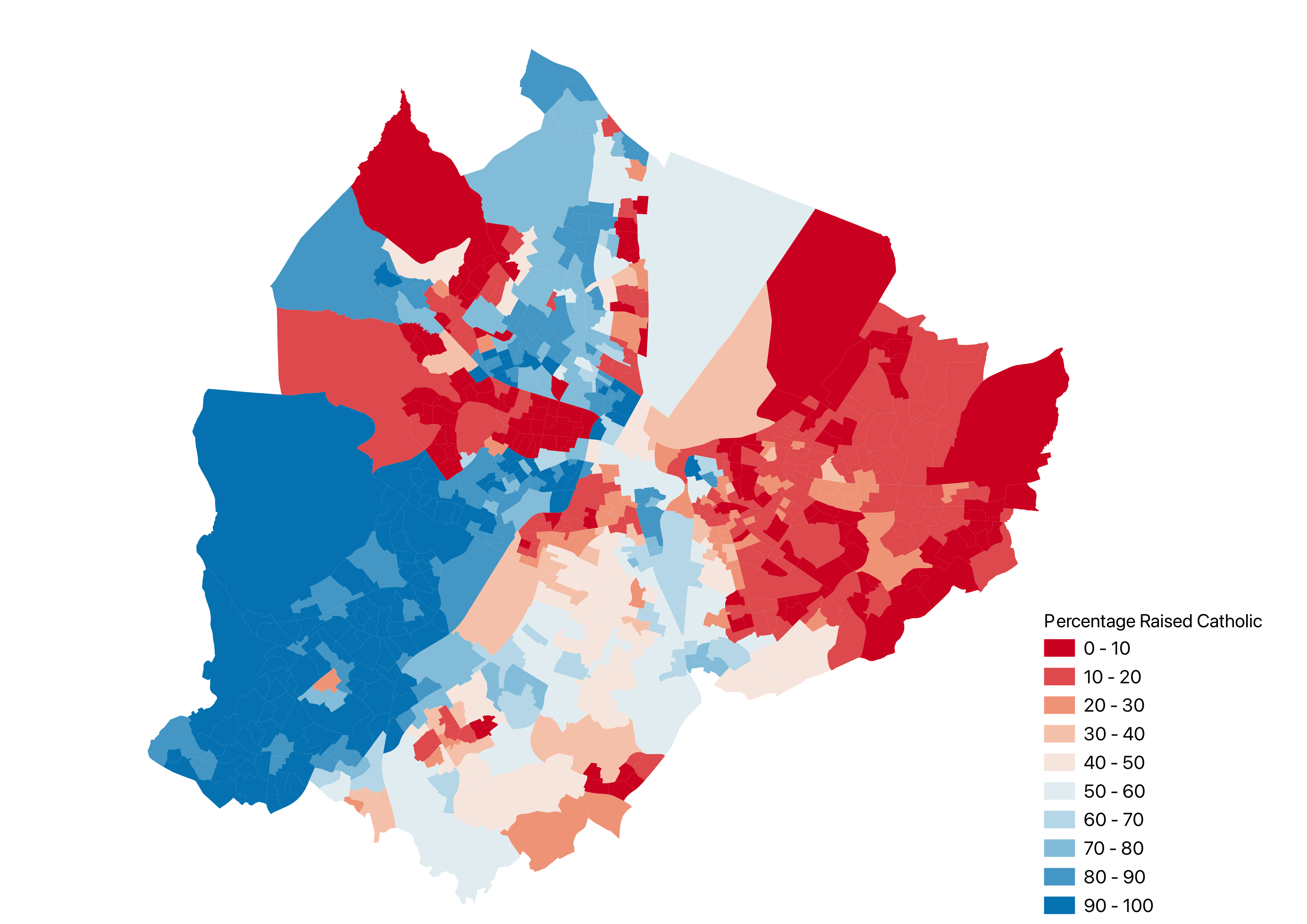
Percentage Catholic or brought up Catholic in 2021

Catholic Percentage by DEA (2014) between 2001 and 2021

Protestant percentage by DEA( 2014) between 2001 and 2021

Similarly to the trend across all of Northern Ireland, the Protestant population within the city has been in decline, while the non-religious, other religious and Catholic population has risen. In 2021, the proportion of residents who identified as Catholic was 43%, 12% Presbyterian, 8% for the Church of Ireland, 3% Methodist, 6% of Christian religions, 3% other religions and 24% no religion or not stated.

== Identity ==
Most commonly stated national identity

Most commonly stated national identity in 2011

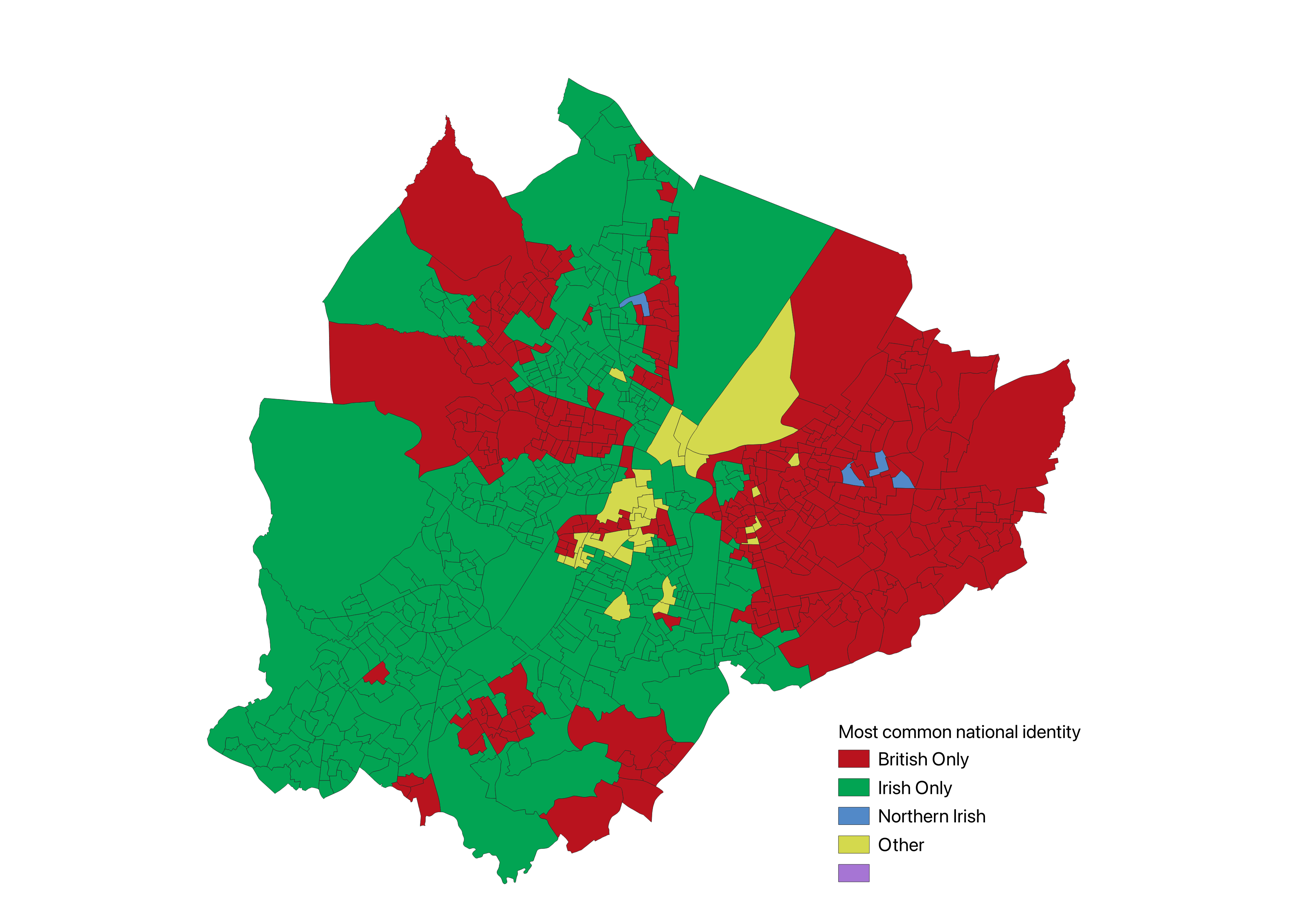
Most commonly stated national identity in 2021

In 2021 the largest identity group was 'Irish only' with 35% of the population. After this was; British only 27%, Northern Irish only 17%, British and Northern Irish only 7%, Irish and Northern Irish only 2%, British, Irish and Northern Irish only 2%, British and Irish less than 1% and Other identities with 10%.

== Ethnicity ==
Ethnic demography of Belfast over time

Percentage born outside the UK and Ireland in 2011

Belfast has become in recent decades an ethnically diverse city, although this ethnic diversity is not to the same scale as other cities across the United Kingdom. Previously, the city was exclusively white (categorised as a simplified ethnic group within Northern Ireland) at 98% white in 2001, however by 2021, this had dropped down to 93%.

Ethnic group	2001		2011		2021	
Ethnic group	Number	%	Number	%	Number	%
White: Total	324,775	98.8%	323,090	96.8%	321,666	93.1%
White	324,475	98.7%	322,813	96.7%	–	–
White: British/Irish/Northern Irish only (national identity) and Christian/no religion/religion not stated (religion)	–	–	–	–	303,252	87.8%
White: Other	–	–	–	–	17,801	5.2%
White: Irish Traveller/White Gypsy	300		277		299	
White: Roma	–	–	–	–	314	
Asian or Asian British: Total	2,181	0.6%	7,208	2.2%	12,908	3.7%
Asian/Asian British: Indian	461	–	2,330	0.7%	4,361	1.3%
Asian/Asian British: Pakistani	187	–	258	–	492	
Asian/Asian British: Bangladeshi	68	–	210	–	–	–
Asian/Asian British: Chinese	1,383	0.4%	2,378	0.7%	4,738	1.4%
Asian/Asian British: Filipino	–	–	–	–	1,637	
Asian/Asian British: Asian Other	82	–	2,032	0.6%	1,680	
Black or Black British: Total	320	–	1,334	0.4%	4,640	1.3%
Black or Black British: Caribbean	67	–	95	–	–	–
Black or Black British: African	168	–	1,074	0.3%	4,127	1.2%
Black or Black British: Other	85	–	165	–	513	
Mixed: Total	837	–	1,599	0.5%	4,159	1.2%
Other: Total	504	–	640	–	2,046	0.6%
Other: Any other ethnic group	–	–	–	–	1,032	
Other: Arab	–	–	–	–	1,014	
Ethnic minority: Total	3,842	1.2%	10,781	3.2%	23,753	6.9%
Total	328,617	100%	333,871	100%	345,419	100%

== Migration ==
=== Country of birth ===
84% of Belfast was born within Northern Ireland, 4% within England, less than 1% for Scotland and Wales, 2% within the Republic of Ireland and 10% from other countries.

=== Passports held ===
43% of Belfast has a UK passport only, 29% has a Republic of Ireland passport only, 6% has both UK and RoI (Republic of Ireland) passports, 8% have other passports and 14% have no passport.

== See also ==
- Belfast
- Ireland#Demographics
- Religion in Northern Ireland
- Segregation in Northern Ireland
