= Eastern Orthodoxy in the Republic of Ireland =

Eastern Orthodox Christianity in Ireland (Irish: Ceartchreideamh in Éirinn) is the presence of Eastern Orthodox Christians in Ireland. Within the country there are several formally organized parishes belonging to various autocephalous churches, primarily the Ecumenical Patriarchate of Constantinople, the Romanian Orthodox Church, and the Russian Orthodox Church.

== History ==
Some Eastern Orthodox propose the theory that the Church in Ireland had experienced a long period of impaired communication and communion with the Holy See prior to the Great Schism of 1054. Some Orthodox thus assert the Celtic Church preached a form of Christianity that was free of Roman legalism. They conclude that the Church in Ireland was, in effect, a provincial form of the Orthodox Christianity as survives in Eastern Orthodoxy. Followers of this theory note that while Irish Christianity was historically tied to Western Christianity and the Catholic Church, Celtic Christians were often at odds with Catholic practice. Bede noted in his Ecclesiastical History of the English People that the Synod of Whitby in 663-664 put Celtic Christians in opposition to continental Catholics and their ritual practices. The Gregorian Reforms of the eleventh century were crystallised in Ireland following the synods of the twelfth century: Cashel I (1101), Ráth Breasail (1111), Kells-Mellifont (1152), and Cashel II (1172). Ireland's intense asceticism ceased with the introduction of Catholic orders of Latin monasticism. Communions including both the Russian Orthodox Church Outside Russia and the Russian Orthodox Autonomous Church claim that pre-schism Ireland was therefore in communion with the Orthodox Church and in recognition of this sometimes include Irish saints in their commemorations. Some congregations have dedicated church buildings to Irish saints, particularly within Western Rite Orthodoxy.

== Modernity ==
The Russian Orthodox tradition was brought to Ireland in the 1920s by the Russian Orthodox Church Outside Russia, which has formally re-joined the Moscow Patriarchate in the 2000s. Greek and Romanian Orthodox churches were first established in Dublin in 1981 and 2000 respectively. All three jurisdictions serve mostly eastern European and Greek immigrants, along with a number of Irish-born converts. Due largely to immigration from Eastern Europe, especially Romania, the number of Orthodox Christians in Ireland has doubled in recent years.

=== Russian Orthodox Church in Ireland ===
Russian Orthodoxy came to Ireland in the aftermath of the Russian Revolution. White Russian refugees arrived in small numbers and settled throughout the country. The Russian Orthodox Divine Liturgy was held in various locations around the Dublin quays by visiting priests from England. In the mid-1960s, Nicholas Couris, an elderly Russian aristocrat and former officer in the Imperial Russian Army and the anti-communist White Army, was ordained a priest in the Russian Orthodox Church Outside Russia. He served a growing congregation of Russian White émigrés, Greek immigrants, and Irish-born converts from a Dublin house chapel until his death in May 1977.

In the early 1990s, work began on Ireland's first Orthodox church to be built since the Schism. The church, situated in Stradbally, Co. Laois, is dedicated to the local monastic St. Colman of Oughaval. In 1993, Divine Liturgy was served there for the first time by Bishop Mark of the Russian Orthodox Church Outside of Russia. After the unification of the Russian Orthodox Church and the Orthodox Church Outside of Russia took place in 2007, priests from the Patriarchate of Moscow began holding regular church services in St. Colman's church. In May 2017, a priest of the Russian Orthodox Church Outside of Russia was assigned to the Parish of St Colman's in Stradbally where weekly services are now held.

The late 1990s saw an influx of people to Ireland from eastern Europe. The Russian Orthodox Church began its activities in Ireland in 1999 with monthly liturgies at the Greek Church on Arbour Hill in Dublin. In 2001, it moved to a former Anglican church at Harold's Cross. Renamed the parish of Saint Peter and Paul, it was dedicated under the authority of the Moscow Patriarchate. Father Michael Gogoleff, a Russian-French priest, serves as its dean, and Father Brian Garrigan, who succeeded Father George Zavershinsky, is the resident priest, occupying the same position between 2002 and 2009. The church community has around 1,500 members, including emigres from the various republics of the former USSR, faithful from Poland and Rusyns from Eastern Slovakia. There is also a significant membership of Orthodox Irish, mostly converts. The services are mainly conducted in Church Slavonic, but a considerable amount of English is also used along with smatterings of Greek, Georgian, Romanian, Serbian and the Irish language. The Russian School of Music was established by the church in Harold's Cross. In September 2009, the Bishop Elisey of Sourozh paid a visit to the Irish parishes of his diocese. In October 2010, the Russian Orthodox Church of Ireland opened two more congregations: in Athlone in Connaught province and Drogheda in Leinster province. It also offers monthly liturgies for members in Waterford, Cork and Galway.

=== Greek Orthodox Church in Ireland ===
In 1981, the Greek Orthodox parish of Our Lady of the Annunciation was established in the former St Mary's Church, Dublin 1, which had been given over by the Church of Ireland. On 24 May of that year, the Greek Orthodox archbishop of Great Britain and Ireland consecrated and elevated the building to the status of a cathedral. When these premises were declared unsafe in 1986, the parish transferred to a house chapel in Artane. In November of that same year, the Church of Ireland transferred another of its defunct churches, in Ranelagh, for Greek Orthodox use. In 1994 the first permanent church was consecrated in Arbour Hill, Dublin. The adjacent hall in Arbour hill is used by the Hellenic Community of Ireland for the delivery of Greek language classes. The community was served by Irish born Father Thomas Carroll until his retirement in 2020.

The Holy Metropolis of Ireland, led by Bishop Iakovos of Zinoupolis, was established following a Holy Synod on 22 March 2024.

=== Romanian Orthodox Church in Ireland ===
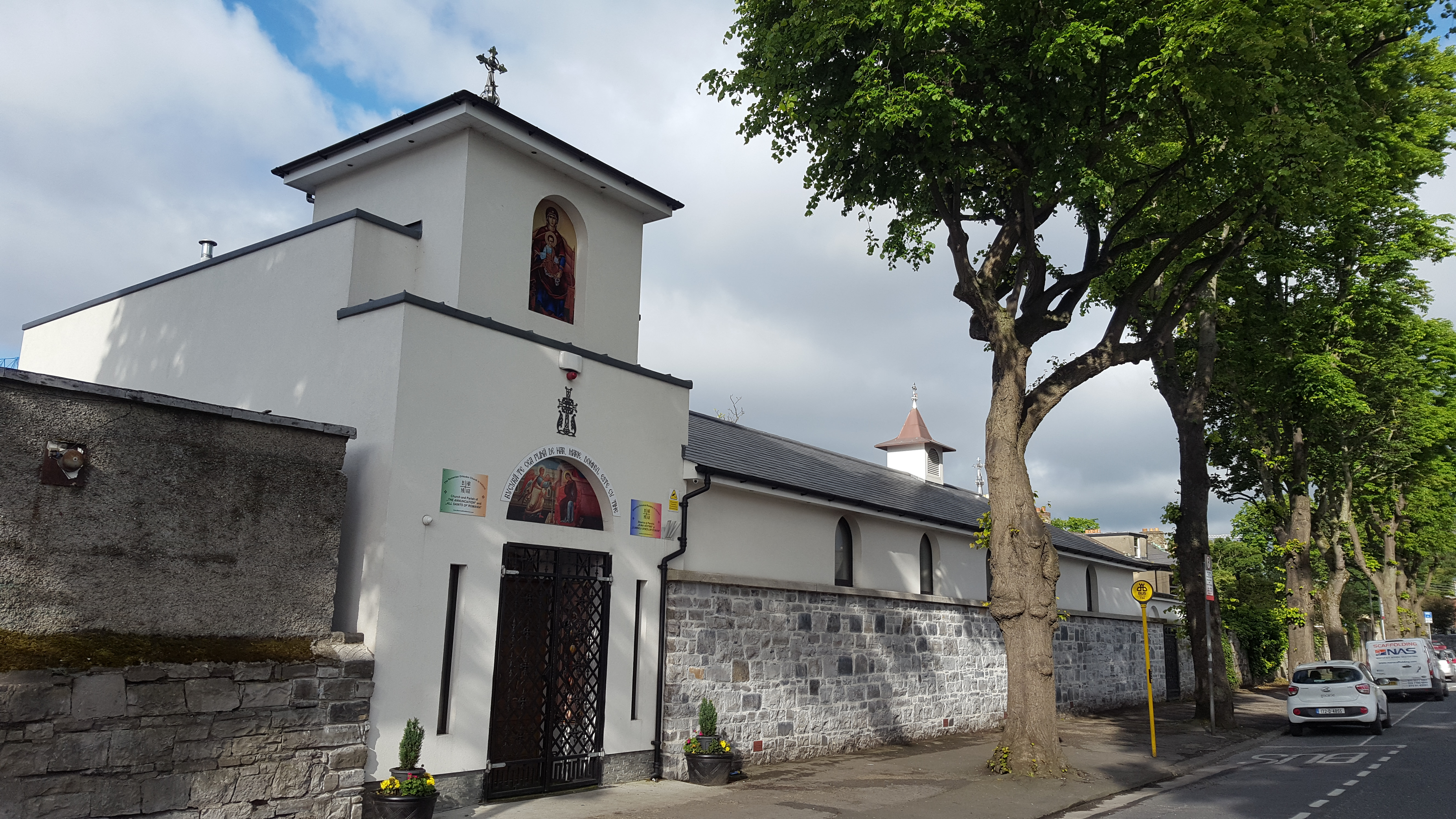
Romanian Orthodox Church, Western Way, Broadstone

The Romanian Irish Orthodox Church appointed its first priest in October 2000. Starting in January 2001, Sunday worship has taken place in Belvedere College Chapel in the centre of Dublin, courtesy of the Jesuit Fathers. In June 2005, the Church of Ireland made Christ Church Leeson Park in Dublin 4 available for the use of the Romanian Orthodox community. The Church celebrates The Exaltation of Holy Cross. It serves around 1,500 people in the Dublin area, around 120 of whom worship in two new parishes. Fr. Godfrey O'Donnell, who helped establish the church service in Dublin in 2001, became the first Irish-born priest ordained into the Romanian Church in 2004.

From 2010, the Romanian Orthodox parish of Ballsbridge had been operating from two alternative locations in Blanchardstown: three recently appointed priests hold the liturgy there every Sunday. The parish has a full calendar of weekday activities, with an evening mass on Wednesdays and Fridays, and special masses are held for each of the celebrations of the Romanian Orthodox calendar. On 9 April 2006, a fourth priest in Ireland was ordained with responsibility for two new parishes in Cork and Galway (where services are conducted in the Anglican St. Nicholas' Collegiate Church). In 2010 Fr Ioan Irineu Craciun relocated to the Romanian Community after 29 years ministering to Greek Orthodox in Arbour Hill. In 2017, the Romanian Orthodox Church moved from Blanchardstown when it opened its new church, The Church of the Annunciation, on Western Way, Broadstone, Dublin D07 FA38. The first mass was said in Western Way in March 2017 in the presence of the Romanian ambassador. There are also occasional Romanian Orthodox liturgies in Tipperary, Tralee, Killorglin and Navan.

2019 saw the establishment of an orthodox monastery, The Life-Giving Spring, in Shannonbridge, Co. Offaly, dedicated to St. Ciaran of Clonmacnoise, by a group of Romanian nuns. The property Ard Ciaran was formerly a retreat centre run by the Catholic Ursuline Order.

=== Other Orthodox Churches ===
In addition, the Antiochian Orthodox Church has parishes in Ireland and their number continues to grow (Antiochian Orthodox Archdiocese of the British Isles and Ireland). Divine Liturgy is served every second Sunday in the Month at the Church of the Holy Rosary Chapel Street Castlebar by the clergy. While growth in the number of members was due to converts from other denominations, in recent years a number of refugees from Syria have increased its membership.

The Serbian Orthodox Church has one parish in Dublin, under the jurisdiction of the Serbian Orthodox Eparchy of Britain and Ireland.

The Georgian Orthodox Church in Ireland serves mostly emigrants from the Republic of Georgia; since May 2012, services have been conducted in the Catholic Carmelite community church in Avila in Dublin.

== See also ==
- Christianity in Ireland
- Catholic Church in the Republic of Ireland
- Protestantism in the Republic of Ireland
