= Protestantism in the Republic of Ireland =

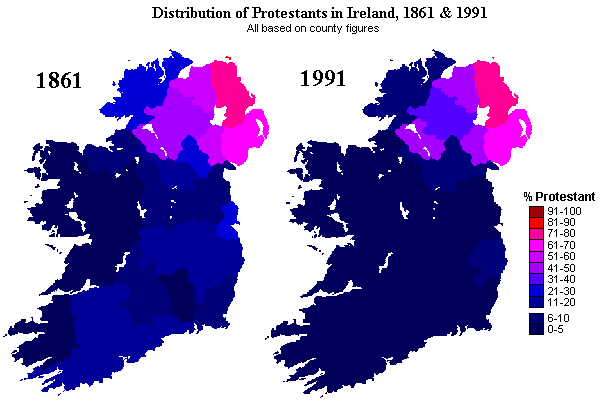
Concentration of Protestants on the island of Ireland by county. The Republic of Ireland covers all bar six northeastern counties.

Protestantism in the Republic of Ireland refers to Protestantism in the Republic of Ireland and its predecessor, the Irish Free State. Protestants who are born in the Republic of Ireland are Irish Citizens. Protestants who are born in Northern Ireland are British and / or Irish depending on their political identity and whether they choose to exercise their right to claim Irish citizenship on the same basis as anywhere else on the island of Ireland (while there is a strong correlation between nationalism and nominal religion, with Protestants more likely to be pro-Union with the UK, this should not be overstated). In 2006, Protestants made up 4.2% of the Republic of Ireland's population versus 10% in 1911. Their population experienced a long period of decline over the 19th and 20th centuries, but slight growth in the 21st century.

== Decline before the Irish Free State ==
The parts of Ireland where the number of Protestants were of higher proportion was closely related to the plantations that occurred throughout the 16th and 17th centuries and the areas where British influence was strongest. The decline in the number of Protestants in the south during the 20th-century is usually attributed to the Partition of Ireland in 1921 and the after-effects. It has been suggested however that the pattern of migration may have started in the second half of the nineteenth century. Important factors for this emigration were socio-economic factors, reinforced by political factors. Irish independence in 1921 however may have accelerated the process.

Research done on the decline of Protestantism in Dublin between 1870 and 1926 provides various reasons, including:

• Working-class Protestant women having a strong inclination to marry British soldiers, who upon the end of their tour of duty would then be posted to other parts of the British Isles.

• Between 1901 and 1911, 15% of Protestant males were in mixed-marriages. The 1901 census indicates that nearly 80% of mixed-marriages resulted in any children being brought up as Roman Catholics, even before the Vatican issued Ne Temere in 1907, which insisted that children in all mixed-marriages must be brought up as Roman Catholics. In the following period from 1911 to 1926 it seems likely that due to an increase in contention between Protestants and Catholics, there was a decrease in mixed-marriages.

• The end of World War I saw the de-industrialisation of Dublin and migration of skilled Protestant workers seeking work. World War I battle deaths also hit the Protestant population hard, which further spurred a migration of young Irish Protestant women to Britain to seek husbands.

In the book Buried Lives, based largely on records held by the Church of Ireland, Robin Bury has argued that there were cases of violence against Protestants during the Civil War. He estimates that 100-200 Protestants were victims of sectarian killings, with the biggest case being the 1922 Dunmanway killings.

== Decline after creation of the Irish Free State ==
After the establishment of the Irish Free State in 1922, the Protestant population declined sharply, reasons for which included:

• The end of the union between a part of Ireland and Great Britain.

• Purchase of land owned by British landowners by the British government and later the Irish Free State government. By 1920 the British government had purchased 13 million acres (53,000 km^{2}) of Irish land and sold farms to the Irish tenants at low payments spread over seven decades. Starting in 1923 the Irish government bought out most of the remaining British landowners, and they and their families departed Ireland.

• The departure of British personnel, such as soldiers and public servants. especially from the British civil service

- Ne Temere decree requiring the children of mixed religious marriages to be raised as Roman Catholic.

• According to the Church of Ireland Gazette: Protestants "have a wholly disproportionate number of old people compared with young, in comparison to Roman Catholics". They were also likely to marry later in life and have fewer children than their Catholic counterparts. The Church of Ireland Gazette also remarks on the "forced exodus of large numbers".

• The Roman Catholic ethos of the Free State.

• Symbols of British influence were seen as an integral part of the Protestant tradition during the interwar period between World War I and II, however the Free State's intent on removing them was viewed by southern Protestants as sectarian.

• The introduction of a "Gaelicisation" policy. The compulsory teaching of the Irish language in schools saw some Protestant parents send their children to school in the United Kingdom. It also meant that Irish was compulsory for roles in the civil service, which resulted in "the continuing emigration of young Protestants in search of jobs", with the requirement seen as "disguised discrimination" by some. However, there were other Protestants who were happy to embrace the Irish language, such as Douglas Hyde who was made the first President of Ireland partly because of his efforts to revive the Irish language.

• The influence of the Roman Catholic Church on government policy, such as: the banning of divorce and contraception; censorship of films and books; and in the education system. This reached its peak with the 1937 constitution giving the Roman Catholic Church "special position" in the state.

The exact numbers of migration based upon religious affiliation before 1926 is complicated by various different reasons. However between the 1911 and 1926 census' it has been suggested that there was a migration of 106,456 people from minority-religions, with at least 60,000 Protestants not connected to the British administration in Ireland. During this period the number of Protestants in what became the Irish Free State dropped from 10% to 7%. This represented a drop of 32% in the Protestant population compared to the 2% drop in the Roman Catholic population. This decrease is often linked to the removal of British forces from the Free State, however the rate of decline was quite similar between native and foreign born Protestants and the drop was five times greater than the total number of Protestants in the British forces in 1911.

=== Treatment of Protestants ===
The Irish Free State had few overt discriminatory religious policies against Protestants and prided itself on its treatment of religious minorities. Delaney argues that this was motivated by the desire to assure Protestants in Northern Ireland that they would receive equal treatment and religious liberty in a future united Ireland.

However, Delaney writes that southern Protestants were "penalised and ill-treated" for being a cultural minority. Nationalism, which was in essence Roman Catholic and Gaelic, took on a triumphalist tone in the state. Social policy during the 1922-1932 government administration was largely based on Roman Catholic beliefs, and events such as the Eucharistic Congress of 1932 helped reinforce the exalted status the Catholic Church enjoyed. The zenith of this anti-British, Roman Catholic and Gaelic ethos came about after the 1932 election, exemplified by the newly elected Taoiseach, Éamon de Valera, who refused to change or compromise on his views of a united Ireland that emphasised Gaelic and Roman Catholic values.

Cosgrove writes that Protestant children were treated fairly and at times given preferential treatment in the education system. However, during the 1930s despite the fact that education in the Free State was under denominational control, Catholicism became more influential and pervasive in the Irish governments education policy, resulting in the Roman Catholic Church having more control over the education system than any other country in the world.

One of the most famous incidents of overt discrimination against Protestants was the Dunbar-Harrison case in 1930. In this instance a Protestant, Letitia Dunbar-Harrison, applied to become a librarian. The Mayo Library Committee, mostly composed of prominent local Roman Catholics including a bishop, originally said that she had inadequate knowledge of Irish for the role. Later during the debate it was remarked "could a Protestant be trusted to hand out books to Catholics?". Dunbar-Harrison was appointed, with the support of the national government, but in the fall-out Mayo County Council was dissolved, and there was strong opposition to the appointment from some prominent Catholic clerics and politicians. Despite the government standing its ground on the appointment, a boycott of the library resulted in W. T. Cosgrave, President of the Executive Council, and Roman Catholic Archdiocese of Tuam, Thomas Gilmartin, coming to an agreement to transfer Dunbar-Harrison from Mayo library to a post in Dublin in January 1932.

Another incident of overt discrimination against Protestants was the Fethard-on-Sea boycott in County Wexford, 1957. In this instance a local Protestant woman who had married a Roman Catholic fled to Belfast after failing to honour her promise to educate her children as Roman Catholics. This resulted in Roman Catholics backed by a number of Roman Catholic priests and bishops boycotting Protestant businesses in the area despite condemnation from the Irish government.

=== Impact ===
Between 1922-1923, emigration consisted of not just families, but also young individuals. In the period between 1926–1936, a greater proportion of young Protestants between the ages of 10–24 years old appear to have emigrated from the Free State compared to older Protestants. The decrease in the number of Protestants resulted in an even greater proportion of Roman Catholics and thus the culture associated with it, furthering Protestant marginalisation and giving the perception of Catholic triumphalism. The coverage of the 1936 census results by The Irish News in 1939 was later reprinted by the Ulster Unionist Council as vindication for their belief of what would happen to Irish Protestants as a whole in a united Ireland under home rule.

Areas where the Protestant minority was strongest tended to see the least decline, primary examples being the three Ulster counties that became part of the Free State: Cavan, Donegal, and Monaghan. Meanwhile, urban centres and military towns saw the greatest decrease. This helped contribute to a greater concentration of Protestants in Northern Ireland.

This emigration affected the Free State economy as Protestants formed a significant part of its commercial and cultural activities.

== Modern reversal in decline ==
From 1921 to 1991 there was a decrease in the Protestant population in the Irish Free State and then the Republic of Ireland, however by 2002, there has been an increase in the three main Protestant denominations: Anglicanism, Presbyterianism, and Methodism.

The number of Protestants belonging to the Church of Ireland in the Republic in 1991 stood at 89,197. By 2006, this number was 121,229, and by 2011 129,039. It was during the 2002-2006 period that the number of members of the Church of Ireland and Presbyterian Church surpassed their 1946 totals. County Clare has the smallest population of Protestants in Ireland; however, its county town, Ennis, saw a six-fold increase in the Church of Ireland population - 68 to 400. The Presbyterian church between 1991 and 2002 saw an increase of almost 56%, followed by an increase of almost 20% between 2002 and 2011. The Methodist Church saw its membership increase nearly 100% between 1991 and 2002, though by 2011 it had declined by 31%.

The cause of this growth is stated as being a mixture of Protestant immigration and the conversion of Catholics. One notable convert was the Dean of Christ Church Cathedral, Dublin, Dr. Dermot Dunne, who was formerly a Catholic cleric. It has been suggested that Catholic Ireland has become more Protestant in social terms, whilst Protestantism itself has become more Catholic in some of its practices.

Despite this, Protestantism since 2002 has been relegated to the third largest group recorded on the census, having been overtaken by those who choose "No Religion". Overall Protestants accounted for 4% of the total Irish population in 2006 and 2011. In the 2016 census Protestantism accounted for 4.2% of the population.

In regards to immigration, of the 137,048 people from the three main Protestant denominations (Church of Ireland, Presbyterian, Methodist) to declare their country of birth, only 94,889 (69.2%) stated the Republic. 27,928 of these immigrants came from the United Kingdom, whilst 3,575 were born in the rest of Europe, 6,641 were from Africa, 1,341 from Asia, 1,730 from America, and 944 from elsewhere.

== Tables ==
=== Number of Protestants by denomination ===
The following table shows the figures for the main Protestant denominations in what is now the Republic of Ireland from 1901 to 2011:

Number of Protestants by denomination
Religion	1891	1901	1911	1926	1936	1946	1961	1971	1981	1991	2002	2006	2011
Church of Ireland	286,804	264,264	249,535	164,215	145,030	124,829	104,016	97,739	95,366	89,187	115,611	121,229	129,039
Presbyterian	51,469	46,714	45,486	32,429	28,067	23,870	18,953	16,052	14,255	13,199	20,582	23,546	24,600
Methodist	18,513	17,872	16,440	10,663	9,649	8,355	6,676	5,646	5,790	5,037	10,033	12,160	6,842
Apostolic/Pentecostal	N/A	N/A	N/A	N/A	N/A	N/A	N/A	N/A	N/A	N/A	3,152	8,116	14,043
Lutheran	N/A	N/A	N/A	N/A	N/A	N/A	N/A	N/A	N/A	N/A	3,068	5,279	5,683
Protestant	N/A	N/A	N/A	N/A	N/A	N/A	N/A	N/A	N/A	N/A	(Note: Included in Church of Ireland figure.)	4,356	5,326
Evangelical	N/A	N/A	N/A	N/A	N/A	N/A	N/A	N/A	N/A	N/A	3,780	5,276	4,188
Baptist	N/A	N/A	N/A	N/A	N/A	N/A	N/A	N/A	N/A	N/A	2,265	3,338	3,531
Latter Day Saints (Mormon) (Note: Depending on the strand of Mormonism, some may identify with traditional Protestant beliefs, whilst others may not.)	N/A	N/A	N/A	N/A	N/A	N/A	N/A	N/A	N/A	N/A	833	1,237	1,284
Quaker (Society of Friends)	N/A	N/A	N/A	N/A	N/A	N/A	N/A	N/A	N/A	N/A	859	882	925
Plymouth Brethren	N/A	N/A	N/A	N/A	N/A	N/A	N/A	N/A	N/A	N/A	222	365	336
Total (Note: Figures before 2002 only include Church of Ireland, Presbyterians, & Methodists.)	356,786	328,850	311,461	207,307	182,746	157,054	129,645	119,437	115,411	107,423	160,405	185,784	195,797
Total %	10.28	10.21	9.92	6.98	6.15	5.31	4.60	4.01	3.35	3.04	4.09	4.38	4.27
Notes

In comparison, the number of Catholics increased from 3,681,446 to 3,861,335. People who stated they had no religion increased from 186,318 to 269,811.

=== Percentage change between censuses ===
The following table shows the percentage change between each census for the three main Protestant denominations in what is now the Republic of Ireland from 1901 to 2011:

Percentage change in Protestants by denomination between 1901 and 2011 censuses
Religion	1901-1911	1911-1926	1926-1936	1936-1946	1946-1961	1961-1971	1971-1981	1981-1991	1991-2002	2002-2011
Church of Ireland	-5.57%	-34.19%	-11.68%	-13.93%	-16.67%	-6.03%	-2.43%	-6.48%	+22.86%	+11.61%
Presbyterian	-2.63%	-28.71%	-13.45%	-14.95%	-20.60%	-15.31%	-11.19%	-7.41%	+55.94%	+19.52%
Methodist	-8.01%	-35.14%	-9.51%	-13.41%	-20.10%	-15.43%	+2.55%	-13.01%	+99.19%	-31.81%

=== Annual average percentage change ===
The following table shows the annual percentage change for the three main Protestant denominations in what is now the Republic of Ireland from 1901 to 2011:

Annual average percentage change in Protestants by denomination between 1901 and 2011
Religion	1901-1911	1911-1926	1926-1936	1936-1946	1946-1961	1961-1971	1971-1981	1981-1991	1991-2002	2002-2011
Church of Ireland	-0.6%	-2.8%	-1.2%	-1.5%	-1.2%	-0.6%	-0.2%	-0.7%	+2.4%	+1.3%
Presbyterian	-0.3%	-2.2%	-1.4%	-1.6%	-1.5%	-1.6%	-1.2%	-0.8%	+4.1%	+2.2%
Methodist	-0.8%	-2.8%	-1.0%	-1.4%	-1.5%	-1.7%	+0.3%	-1.4%	+6.5%	-3.5%

== See also ==
- Catholic Church in the Republic of Ireland
- Christianity in Ireland
- Church of Ireland
- Eastern Orthodoxy in the Republic of Ireland
- Presbyterian Church in Ireland
- Protestantism in Ireland
- Religion in Northern Ireland
- Religion in the Republic of Ireland

== Bibliography ==
- Bury, Robin. Buried Lives: The Protestants of Southern Ireland. Dublin: History Press, 2017. ISBN 9781845888800.
- Connolly, S.J. Oxford Companion to Irish History. Oxford University Press, 2007. ISBN 978-0-19-923483-7.
- Cosgrove, Art. A New History of Ireland, Volume II: Medieval Ireland 1169-1534. Oxford University Press, 2008. ISBN 978-0-19-953970-3.
- Delaney, Enda. Demography, State and Society: Irish Migration to Britain, 1921-1971. Liverpool University Press, 2000. ISBN 0-85323-745-X.
