= Religion in the Republic of Ireland =

Religions in the Republic of Ireland, 2022 census
1. Catholicism (69.1%)
2. Protestantism (4.20%)
3. Eastern Orthodoxy (2.10%)
4. Other Christians (0.70%)
5. No religion (14.8%)
6. Islam (1.60%)
7. Hinduism (0.70%)
8. Unspecified (7.10%)

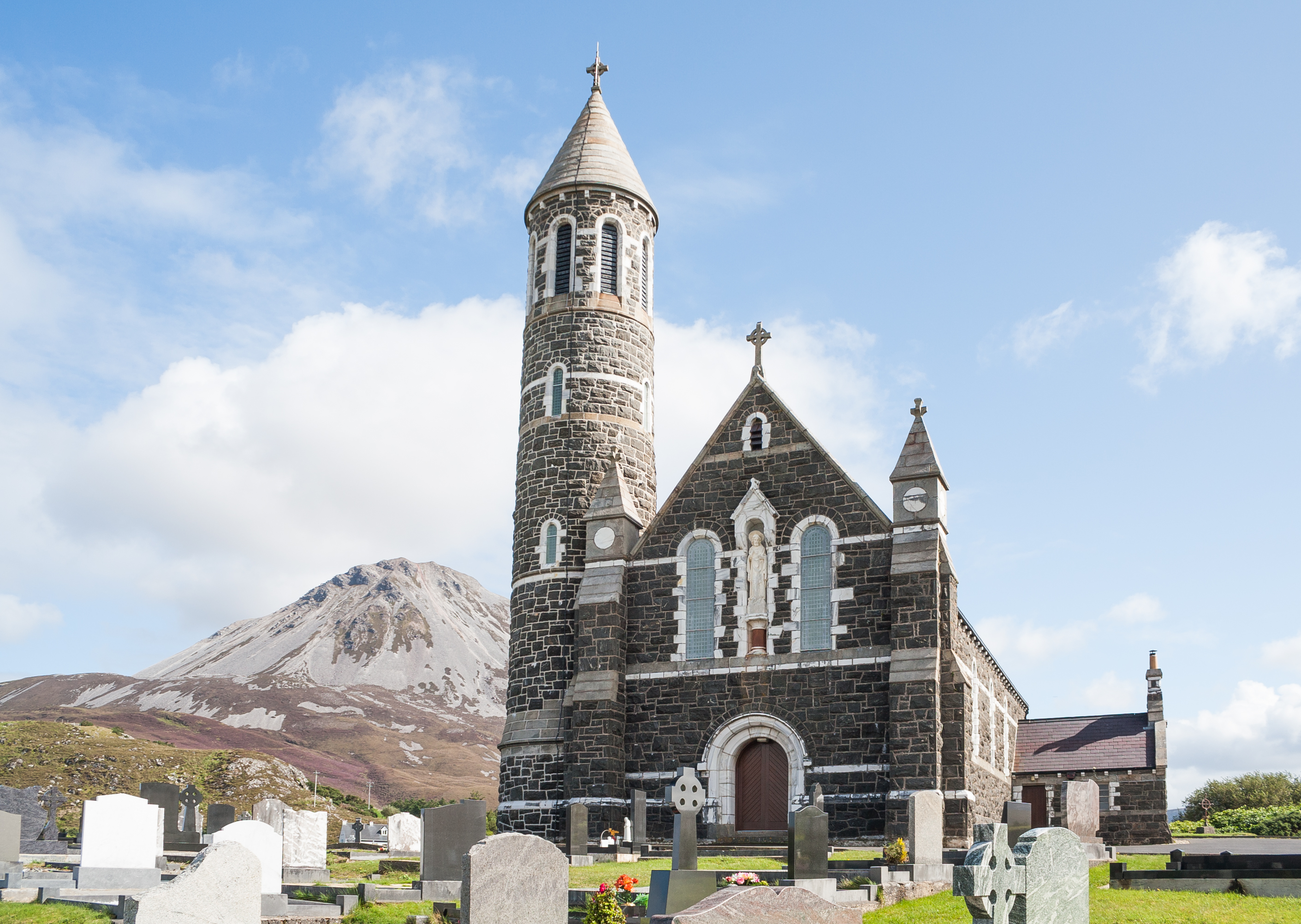
Church of the Sacred Heart in Dunlewey in County Donegal

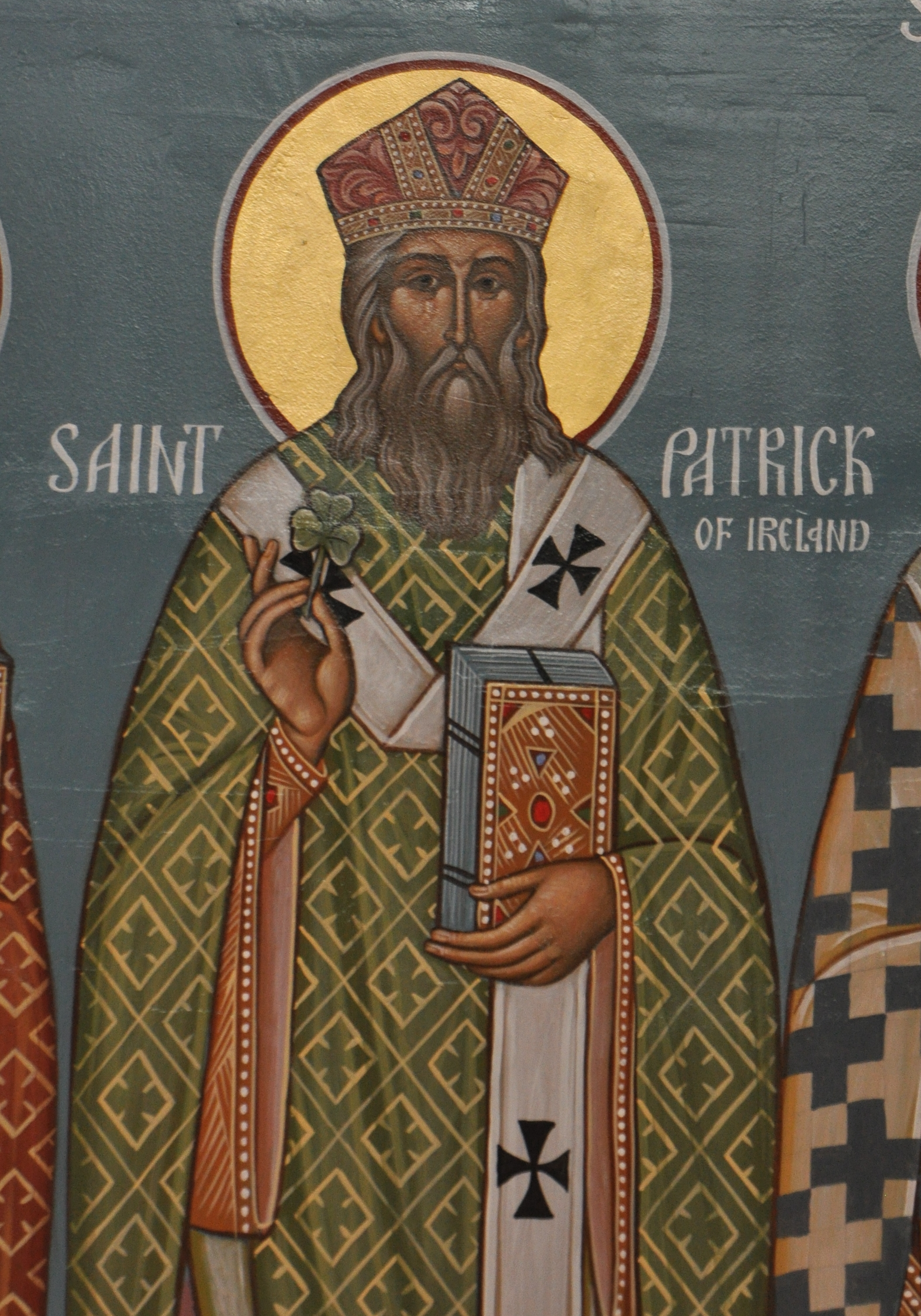
The Christianisation of Ireland is associated with the 5th-century activities of St. Patrick.

The predominant religion in the Republic of Ireland is Christianity, with the largest denomination being the Catholic Church. The Constitution of Ireland says that the state may not endorse any particular religion and guarantees freedom of religion.

In the 2022 census, 69.1% (3.5 million) of the population identified as Catholic. The next largest group after Catholic was "no religion" at 14%. The Eastern Orthodox Church was Ireland's second largest Christian denomination, with 2.1% of the population identifying as Orthodox Christians. It has been Ireland's fastest-growing religion since 1991.

The third largest Christian denomination, the Church of Ireland declined in membership for much of the 20th century, but remained largely static at 2% of the population between the 2016 and 2022 census. Other significant Protestant denominations are the Presbyterian Church in Ireland, followed by the Methodist Church in Ireland. Ireland's Muslim and Hindu populations have experienced significant growth in recent years.

== Politics ==
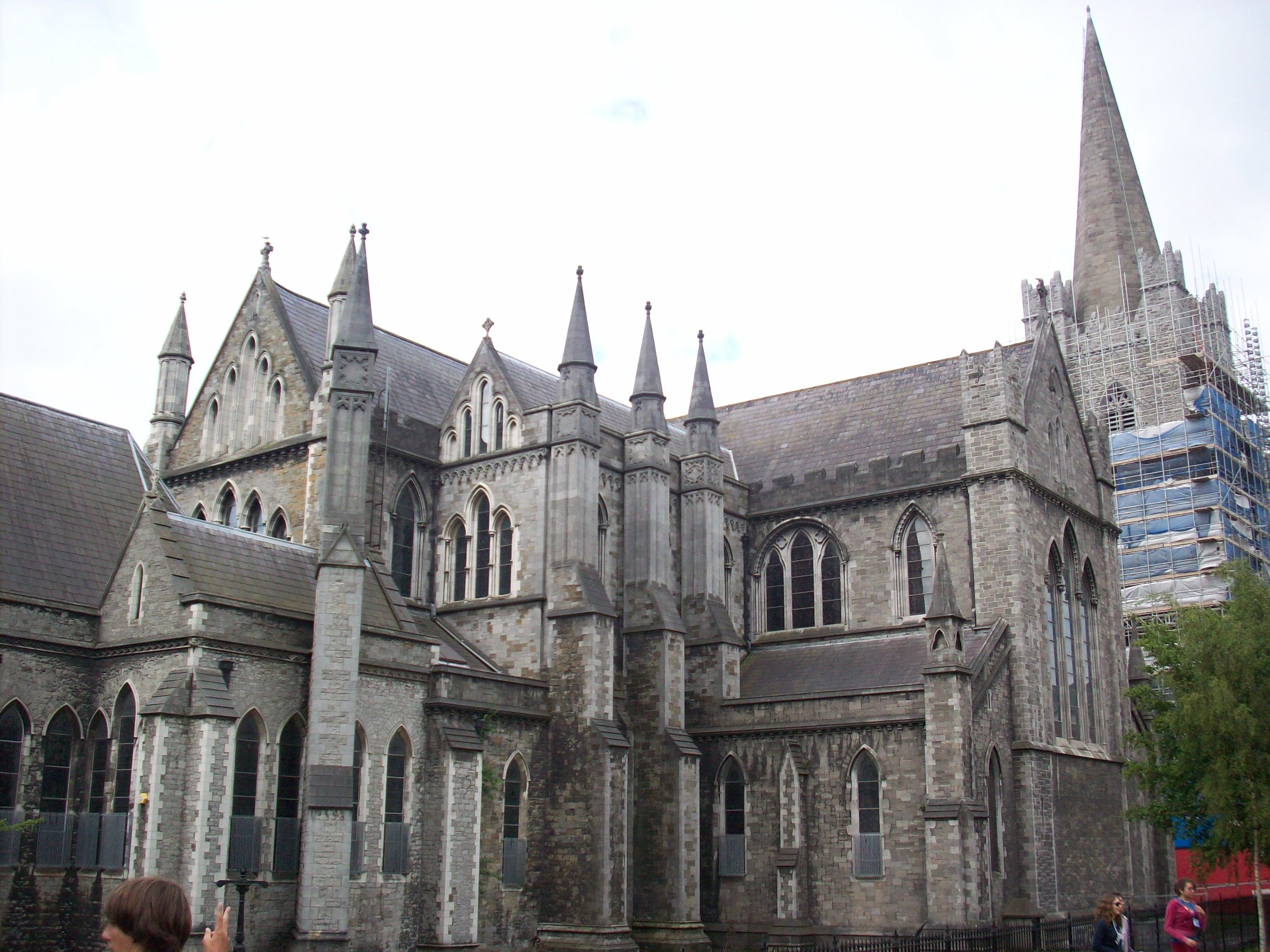
St. Patrick's Cathedral in Dublin, the National Cathedral of the Church of Ireland.

Originally, the 1937 Constitution of Ireland gave the Catholic Church a "special position" as the church of the majority, but also recognised other Christian denominations and Judaism. As with other predominantly Catholic European states, the Irish state underwent a period of legal secularisation in the late twentieth century. In 1972, the article of the Constitution naming specific religious groups, including the Catholic Church, was deleted by the fifth amendment of the constitution in a referendum.

Article 44 remains in the Constitution. It begins:

The State acknowledges that the homage of public worship is due to Almighty God. It shall hold His Name in reverence, and shall respect and honour religion.

The article also establishes freedom of religion (for belief, practice, and organisation without undue interference from the state), prohibits endowment of any particular religion, prohibits the state from religious discrimination, and requires the state to treat religious and non-religious schools in a non-prejudicial manner.

== Education ==
Despite a large number of schools in the Republic of Ireland being run by religious organisations but funded by the state, a general trend of secularism is occurring within the Irish population, particularly in the younger generations.

Many efforts have been made by secular groups to eliminate the rigorous study in the second and sixth classes, to prepare for the sacraments of Holy Communion and confirmation in Catholic schools. Parents can ask for their children to be excluded from religious study if they wish. However, religious studies as a subject was introduced into the state administered Junior Certificate in 2001; it is not compulsory and deals with aspects of different religions, not focusing on one particular religion.

In October 2020, general secretary of Education and Training Boards Ireland Paddy Lavelle confirmed that multidenominational state secondary schools, called State's Education and Training Boards (ETBs) - formerly called vocational schools - were going to phase out a set of Catholic influences such as mandatory graduation masses, displaying Catholic symbols only, and visits from diocesan inspectors, as described in the 'framework for the recognition of religious belief/identities of all students in ETB schools'.

== Christianity ==
Christianity is the largest religion in Ireland based on baptisms. Irish Christianity is dominated by the Catholic Church, and Christianity as a whole accounts for 82.3% of the Irish population. Most churches are organised on an all-Ireland basis, which includes both Northern Ireland and the Republic of Ireland. The vast majority of Protestants in all of Ireland live within the nine-county Province of Ulster, especially within Northern Ireland, East Donegal, and Inishowen.

- Catholic Church in Ireland
- Protestantism in Ireland
- Presbyterian Church in Ireland
- Methodist Church in Ireland
- Eastern Orthodoxy in the Republic of Ireland
- The Church of Jesus Christ of Latter-day Saints in Ireland
- Ireland Yearly Meeting

Irish travellers have traditionally adopted a very particular attitude to the Catholic Church, with a focus on figures such as "healing priests". More generally a tradition of visions continues, often outside of Church sanction.

Evangelical movements have recently spread both within the established churches and outside them. Celtic Christianity has become increasingly popular, again both within and outside established churches.

The patron saints of Ireland for Catholics and Anglicans are Saint Patrick, Saint Brigid and Saint Columba. Saint Patrick is the only one of the three who is commonly recognised as the patron saint. Saint Patrick's Day is celebrated in Ireland and abroad on 17 March.

Eastern Orthodoxy in Ireland is represented mainly by immigrants from Eastern European countries, such as Romania, Russia, or Ukraine. Orthodox Christians account for 2.1% of the population.

=== Church attendance ===
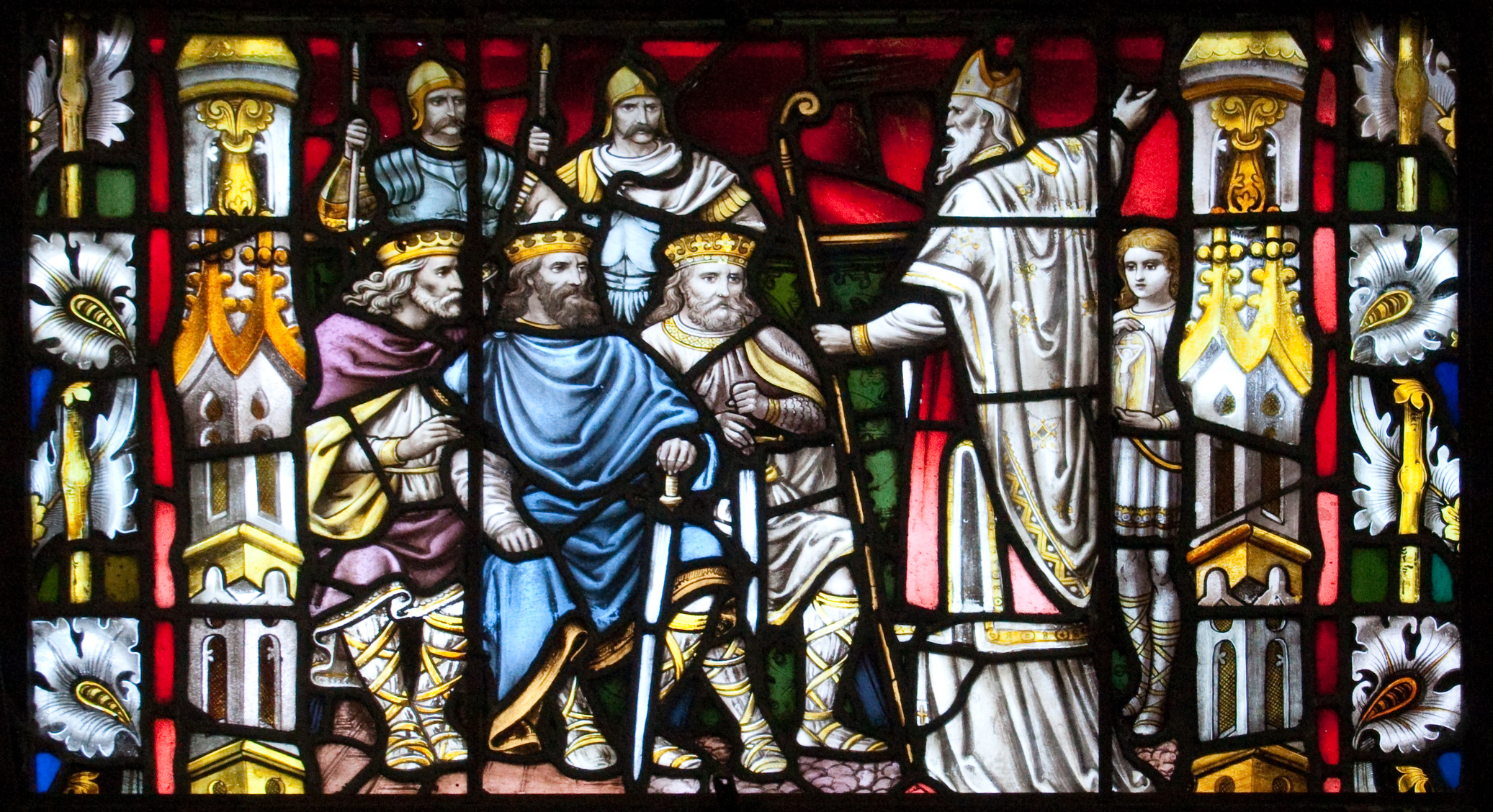
Saint Patrick, shown here preaching to kings, was a Romano-Briton Christian missionary and is the most generally recognised patron saint of Ireland.

Church attendance in the Republic of Ireland
| Year | % of weekly church attendance in Ireland |
|---|---|
| 1973 | 91 |
| 1984 | 87 |
| 1985 | 85 |
| 1990 | 85 |
| 1990 | 81 |
| 1991 | 79 |
| 1995 | 64 |
| 1996 | 66 |
| 1998 | 60 |
| 2002 | 48 |
| 2003 | 50 |
| 2005 | 34 |
| 2005 | 44 |
| 2006 | 48 |
| 2007 | 67 |
| 2007–2008 | 42 |
| 2008 | 45 |
| 2009 | 46 |

Church attendance among Irish Catholics
| Year | % of weekly church attendance among Irish Catholics |
|---|---|
| 1972–1973 | 91 |
| 1990 | 85 |
| 2007–2008 | 44 |
| 2010 | 40.2 |
| 2011 | 33 |
| 2018 | 32 |

In 2008, Ireland had one of the highest rates of regular Mass attendance in the Europe. Daily Mass attendance was 13% in 2006. There was a reduction in weekly attendance from 85% to 48% between 1990 and 2006, although the decline was reported as levelling off. A 1970s survey recorded figures of 91%.

In 2011, it was reported that weekly Mass attendance in Dublin was on average 18%, with it being lower among younger generations and in some areas less than 2%. A 2012 survey of Irish Catholics undertaken by the Association of Catholic Priests found the weekly mass attendance rate to be 35% on an all-island basis, while daily mass attendance was reported at 3%.

== No religion ==
While Ireland was traditionally Catholic throughout much of its modern history, irreligion in Ireland increased seven-fold between the 1991 census and 2016 census, and further increased as of the 2022 census. At the 2022 census, 14% of the population was irreligious.

Among Roman Catholics, a 2010 Bishops Conference survey found that 10.1% of Irish adults who identified as Roman Catholic did not believe in God.

In a 2012 WIN-Gallup International poll, Ireland had the second highest decline in religiosity from 69% in 2005 to 47% in 2012. Those who considered themselves not a religious person increased from 25% in 2005 to 44% in 2012. The poll showed that 10% of Ireland considered themselves convinced atheists, which was an increase from 2005. These percentages decreased further between 2012 and 2016.

== Judaism ==
The earliest recorded presence of Jews in Ireland was in 1062 in the Annals of Inisfallen. In 1946, the Jewish population was 3,907. In 2011, the population declined to 1,581, due to emigration. As of 2016, those listing their religion as Jewish was 2,557, the statistical surge since 2011 attributed to the presence of American hi-tech workers who are dominantly secular.

== Islam ==
In 2017, Islam was the third largest religion in Ireland, constituting 1.62% of the country's population. In 2022, there were 83,300 practising Muslims living in Ireland, up from 63,000 in 2016. There are approximately 50 mosques and prayer centres in Ireland. There is more than one mosque or prayer centre in each province. Islam has a 60-year long and complex organisational history in Ireland.

== Buddhism ==
The Buddhist population in Ireland is 9,358 (0.2%). Irish Buddhists such as U Dhammaloka are recorded from the late nineteenth century on, with numbers growing particularly in the 21st century. Beyond formal membership in Theravada, Mahayana, Vajrayana and Western Buddhist groups, there is increasing syncretism, with self-identified Christians and others using Buddhist meditation techniques, Buddha images, texts by figures such as the 14th Dalai Lama and so on.

Reputed links between Buddhism and Celtic religion have long played a role in Irish literature. The first Irish Buddhist Union was formed in 2018, with representatives of five Buddhist schools coming together to form the body.

== Sikhism ==
In 2016, there were approximately 2,000 Irish Sikhs, with 1,705 recorded in the 2016 census. Most Sikhs in Ireland are based in Dublin, where the Gurdwara, Guru Nanak Darbar is the main place of worship and in recent times has facilitated a Sikh parade known as the Nagar Kirtan during Vaisakhi celebrations.

== Hinduism ==
Hinduism is a minority faith in Ireland, followed by 0.7% of its population. In the 2022 Census, there were 33,043 Hindus in Ireland.

== Neo-paganism ==
Various Neopagan movements are active in Ireland, especially Wicca, Neo-druidry and Celtic Polytheism. Ireland is a significant point of reference for various kinds of Celtic and other neo-pagan spirituality and religious practice around the world, such as the Fellowship of Isis.

== New Age religious movements ==
New Age religious movements are becoming increasingly significant in Ireland, often as a form of syncretism for members of established religions. Participation is strongly gendered, with a high proportion of women.

== Demographics ==
=== Census information ===
Between 2006 and 2011, Catholics decreased as a percentage of the population. Catholicism still increased in absolute numbers, due to an excess of births over deaths, and immigration from countries such as Poland. Between 2011 and 2016, absolute numbers of Catholics fell. In the same period, Protestantism, including the Church of Ireland, decreased in percentage but has experienced a modest rise in absolute numbers. Those declaring no religion, Eastern Orthodoxy, and Islam had significant increases.

The percentage of respondents who said they followed a religion other than Catholicism, 2011 census.

The percentage of respondents who said they had no religion, 2011 census.

Religion stated in Irish censuses, 1861–2016; number and percentage of total population return
| Answer(s) (Note: Through to 1971, the religion question was answered in freeform text. From 2002, common answers have been available as checkboxes. These are noted in the table.) | 1861 (Note: Pre-partition totals for the 26 counties that became the Irish Free State in 1922.) | 1911 | 1926 | 1971 | 2002 | 2011 | 2016 | 2022 |
| Christian | 4,390,893 (99.75) | 3,125,558 (99.55) | 2,959,293 (99.57) | 2,917,097 (97.95) | 3,659,281 (93.42) | 4,107,274 (90.76) | 3,992,791 (85.14) | 3,885,560 (75.5) |
|---|---|---|---|---|---|---|---|---|
| Catholic (Note: This answer was available as a checkbox on the 2002, 2011, and 2016 censuses.) | 3,933,575 (89.36) | 2,812,509 (89.58) | 2,751,269 (92.57) | 2,795,666 (93.87) | 3,462,606 (88.39) | 3,831,187 (84.66) | 3,729,115 (78.30) | 3,540,412 (68.8) |
| Church of Ireland and other Anglican (Note: Through to 2002, answer "Protestant" was included under "Church of Ireland" (called "Protestant Episcopalian" before 1961)) | 372,723 (8.47) | 249,535 (7.95) | 164,215 (5.53) | 97,739 (3.28) | 115,611 (2.95) | 124,445 (2.75) | 126,414 (2.61) | 126,658 (2.5) |
| Orthodox (Note: This answer was available as a checkbox on the 2011 and 2016 censuses.) | | | | | 10,437 (0.27) | 44,003 (0.97) | 62,187 (1.32) | 105,827 (2.1) |
| Christian (not further specified) | | | | | 21,403 (0.55) | 39,652 (0.88) | 37,427 (0.77) | 38 408 (0.7) |
| Presbyterian | 66,172 (1.50) | 45,486 (1.45) | 32,429 (1.09) | 16,052 (0.54) | 20,582 (0.53) | 22,835 (0.50) | 24,211 (0.47) | 23,597 (0.5) |
| Apostolic or Pentecostal | | | | | 3,152 (0.08) | 13,876 (0.31) | 13,350 (0.28) | 13,632 (0.3) |
| Evangelical | | | | | 3,780 (0.10) | 3,972 (0.09) | 9,724 (0.20) | 8,859 (0.2) |
| Jehovah's Witness | | | | | 4,430 (0.11) | 6,024 (0.13) | 6,264 (0.13) | 6,445 (0.1) |
| Methodist, (Note: This answer was available as a checkbox on the 2002 census.) Wesleyan | 17,480 (0.40) | 16,440 (0.52) | 10,663 (0.36) | 5,646 (0.19) | 10,033 (0.26) | 6,280 (0.14) | 6,471 (0.12) | 5,355 (0.1) |
| Lutheran | | | | 756 (0.03) | 3,068 (0.08) | 5,048 (0.11) | 5,329 (0.10) | 3,706 (0.1) |
| Protestant (not further specified) | | | | | | 4,263 (0.09) | 5,409 (0.09) | 5,237 (0.1) |
| Baptist | 943 (0.02) | 1,588 (0.05) | 717 (0.02) | 591 (0.02) | 2,265 (0.06) | 3,219 (0.07) | 3,957 (0.08) | 4,262 (0.1) |
| Born again Christian | | | | | | | 2,565 (0.05) | 3,162 (0.1) |
| Mormon | | | | | 833 (0.02) | 1,202 (0.03) | 1,209 (0.03) | |
| Seventh-day Adventist | | | | | | | 1,178 (0.03) | |
| Society of Friends | 3,812 (0.08) | 2,445 (0.07) | | 647 (0.02) | 859 (0.02) | 899 (0.02) | 848 (0.02) | |
| Unitarian | | | | | | | 473 (0.01) | |
| Church of Christ | | | | | | | 378 (0.01) | |
| Jacobite | | | | | | | 296 (0.01) | |
| Brethren | | | | | 222 (0.01) | 309 (0.01) | 272 (0.01) | |
| Kimbanguist | | | | | | | 69 | |
| Congregationalist | | | | | | 60 | 68 | |
| Salvation Army | | | | | | | 52 | |
| Unificationist | | | | | | 60 | 34 | |
| Other religions | 341 (0.01) | 3,805 (0.12) | 3,686 (0.12) | 2,633 (0.09) | 29,526 (0.75) | 71,003 (1.57) | 95,746 (2.04) | 133,603 (2.7) |
| Islam | | | | | 19,147 (0.49) | 48,130 (1.06) | 62,032 (1.32) | 81,930 (1.6) |
| Hindu | | | | | 3,099 (0.08) | 10,302 (0.23) | 13,729 (0.29) | 33,827 (0.7) |
| Buddhist | | | | | 3,894 (0.10) | 8,355 (0.18) | 9,358 (0.20) | 9,285 (0.2) |
| Spiritualist | | | | | | | 2,922 (0.06) | 3.350 (0.1) |
| Pagan, Pantheist | | | | | 1,106 (0.03) | 1,883 (0.04) | 2,645 (0.06) | 3.868 (0.1) |
| Jewish | 341 (0.01) | 3,805 (0.12) | 3,686 (0.12) | 2,633 (0.09) | 1,790 (0.05) | 1,675 (0.04) | 2,557 (0.05) | 2,193 (0.04) |
| Sikh | | | | | | | 1,705 (0.04) | 2,183 (0.04) |
| Baháʼí | | | | | 490 (0.01) | 507 (0.01) | 447 (0.01) | 518 (0.01) |
| Jain | | | | | | | 134 | 349 (0.01) |
| Taoist | | | | | | | 171 | 200 |
| Rastafari | | | | | | | 114 | |
| Deist | | | | | | | 97 | |
| Hare Krishna | | | | | | 91 | 87 | |
| Scientologist | | | | | | | 87 | |
| Satanism | | | | | | | 78 | |
| Shinto | | | | | | | 55 | |
| Zoroastrian | | | | | | | 35 | |
| Eckist | | | | | | | 30 | |
| Theist | | | | | | | 30 | |
| Irreligion | | | | 7,616 (0.26) | 140,382 (3.58) | 265,246 (5.86) | 474,734 (10.12) | 758,734 (14.8) |
| No religion | | | | 7,616 (0.26) | 138,264 (3.53) | 256,830 (5.68) | 451,941 (9.64) | 755,455 (14.7) |
| Lapsed (Roman) Catholic | | | | | 590 (0.02) | 1,268 (0.03) | 8,094 (0.17) | 3,279 (0.1) |
| Atheist | | | | | 500 (0.01) | 3,751 (0.08) | 7,477 (0.16) | |
| Agnostic | | | | | 1,028 (0.03) | 3,393 (0.07) | 5,006 (0.11) | |
| Jedi Knight | | | | | | | 2,050 (0.04) | |
| Pastafarian | | | | | | | 92 | |
| Lapsed Church of Ireland | | | | | | 4 | 74 | |
| Unspecified | 10,877 (0.25) | 10,325 (0.33) | 9,013 (0.30) | 50,902 (1.71) | 88,014 (2.25) | 81,758 (1.81) | 126,650 (2.70) | 367,328 (7.1) |
| Not stated | | | | 46,648 (1.57) | 79,094 (2.02) | 68,668 (1.52) | 119,349 (2.54) | 345,165 (6.7) |
| Other / Other stated (Note: The "other" (before 1971) or "other stated" category is not directly comparable between censuses, because later ones enumerate some answers separately which were included within "other" in earlier ones.) | 10,877 (0.25) | 10,325 (0.33) | 9,013 (0.30) | 4,254 (0.14) | 8,920 (0.23) | 13,090 (0.29) | 7,301 (0.16) | 22 163 (0.4) |
| Total population | 4,402,111 | 3,139,688 | 2,971,992 | 2,978,248 | 3,917,203 | 4,525,281 | 4,689,921 | 5,145,225 |

Notes

In 2016 census figures:

- 84.6% of the Irish population were Christian.
- 1.3% of the Irish population were Muslim.
- 10% of the Irish population had no religion.

In a 2010 Eurobarometer Poll:

- 70% of Irish citizens answered that "they believe there is a God"
- 20% answered that "they believe there is some sort of spirit or life force"
- 7% answered that "they do not believe there is any sort of spirit, God, or life force"

In a 2012 Eurobarometer Poll when people were shown a card listing options for religious identification:

- 92% of Irish citizens answered that they are Christian (88% Catholic).
- 5% answered that they are non-believers or agnostic.
- 2% answered that they are atheists.
- 1% answered in some other way .

== Freedom of religion ==
In 2023, Ireland scored 4 out of 4 for religious freedom by the US-based Freedom House.

== See also ==
- Catholic Church in Ireland
- Christianity in Ireland
- Church of Ireland
- Eastern Orthodoxy in the Republic of Ireland
- Irish Catholics
- Protestant decline in Ireland (19th-20th centuries)
- Protestantism in Ireland
- Religion in Northern Ireland
- Religion in the United Kingdom
- Secularism in the Republic of Ireland
