= Collon =

Village in County Louth, Ireland

Collon Collann
- Village
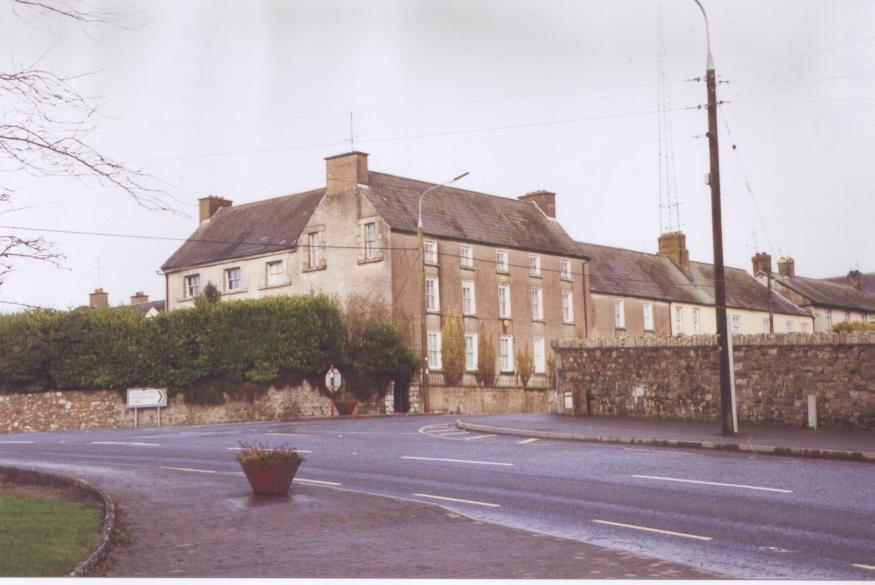
- The Foster homestead at Collon

- Location in Ireland
- Coordinates: 53°46′43″N 6°28′52″W
- Country: Ireland
- Province: Leinster
- County: County Louth

Area
  - Total: 17.69 km^{2} (6.83 sq mi)
- Elevation: 128 m (420 ft)

Population (2016)
  - Total: 896
  - Density: 50.7/km^{2} (131/sq mi)
- Time zone: UTC+0 (WET)
  - Summer (DST): UTC-1 (IST (WEST))
- Irish Grid Reference: O001820

Collon (Irish: Collann) is a village and townland in County Louth, Ireland. It is in the south-west of the county, 11 km north-west of Drogheda, on the N2 road. The village is home to the Cistercian Abbey of New Mellifont, and to Collon House, the ancestral home of the Foster family. The village is in a civil parish of the same name.

== History ==
The Church of Ireland parish church at the lower end was built in 1810 to a design by Daniel Augustus Beaufort who was the rector between 1789 and 1821. There is a memorial in the graveyard at the front of the church to men of the parish who died during the 1914–18 Great War, inscribed on the front is the name of Lt. James Emerson V.C. who was born in the village. The church has been described as "dramatic and atmospheric" and hosted the 2008 Ardee Baroque Festival.

The Foster Family first settled in Dunleer in County Louth in 1660 until they moved into their estate in the heart of Collon in 1744, which can still be seen today. At the time the family estate was our 6,000 acres. The Foster family, who came to Ireland from Cumberland in the seventeenth century, were for several generations the dominant influence in Dunleer, which they represented in the Irish House of Commons. Collon House, the family seat was built about 1740 by Antony Foster, Chief Baron of the Irish Exchequer, and extended in the 1770s by his son John Foster, 1st Baron Oriel, the celebrated "Speaker Foster". During the middle of the eighteenth century, Anthony Foster followed by John Foster developed a new estate in the hills of Collon. For John's public/ work image as a politician and economic expert it was crucial for his estate to be planned out as a 'model village'. New roads were developed going up through the hills in order to help form new farmland.

The village of Collon was planned around the big house and land surrounding it. This landscape that the Fosters had helped develop around Collon is still how the village is laid out today. Anthony Foster made his attributions to the land by improving fertility, drainage and overall agricultural improvements to the land and John Foster made his attributions to the land by beginning the linen industry which created huge success and employment in the village and he also helped promote Protestant dwellers to live here.

John Foster was both a politician and businessman who encouraged the growth of the linen industry in Collon by facilitating the construction of mills which employed Protestant weavers who settled in the area. The northern line weavers helped attribute to the Collon linen industry. The freestanding red brick chimney that remains standing today, dates back to the 1860 linen mill located on the west side of School Lane, Collon (Coordinates – 300184, 281694). South of Collon, where the linen factory was located, was known as the Bleach Green. Gillian Darley wrote in 'Villages of Vision' that Collon has "two intersecting streets around Foster's cotton manufactory: when Lewis' Guide was compiled the linen industry had collapsed, the cotton was still continuing". Employees carried out spinning and weaving, where often at times the bleaching of linen could take up to forty acres.

The Foster family brought in huge amounts of workers to the mills and linen factories in Collon, but most especially Protestant dwellers due to their English descent. The Collon linen industry was continued by the De La Hoyde family post John Foster. They developed three corn mills alongside the River Mattock which were a big enough success to export oatmeal across the channel to England. A freestanding chimney in Collon, still standing, has been dated back to 1860 that was used for the local linen mill. The chimney is a square plan with red brick English bond shaft, located on the west side of the main road. This chimney is a great reminder to the local people of the industrial history this village has. The chimney would have been surrounded by mills and people constantly at work, creating an economic flow into the village but now it stands alone.

In 1840, Collon was described as “a remarkably neat” town and credit was given to its proprietors the Fosters. The town consisted of a market-house that improvements were made to by the Fosters during the end of the 18th century and into the 19th century. It was common at the time for landlords to invest in urban projects and improvements such as these market houses and expect in return tenants would make their improvements to their own properties, this allowed Collon to grow more attractive to new tenants.

The Foster family were political, therefore the market house was used to register land tenants to vote in the parliamentary elections. John Foster had reliable tenants who would vote due to the convenience of the Collin market house, which put him at an advantage over other political candidates.

At one point there was a Russian language school in the village, which was founded by White Russian emigres, Nicholas Couris and his wife. It is rumoured that the British spies Philby, Burgess and Maclean visited the school as part of their Russian language training.

The village contains three longstanding public houses; Stanleys Bar (est. 1896; formerly Matthew's), Watters Bar (est. 1954) and Donegans Pub.

== Development ==
The early developments of Collon can be found on the south side of the village. Nowadays the village is expanding out towards the East and the N2, this is where the majority of the current housing developments are being built. Collon really expanded in the Industrial Revolution mostly due to the linen industry and mills created by James Foster, this was when the model village was created. This was developed around the village's crossroads. Pushed back from the main street, the model village was set out to be green and an open-air market. In the 1990s and 2000s, during the Celtic Tiger period, Collon experienced some development and people moved to the area. In later years, development has been cut short due to huge areas of free land not being able to be used for developments as they are designated as OpenSpace, home to the river Mattock and many mature trees.

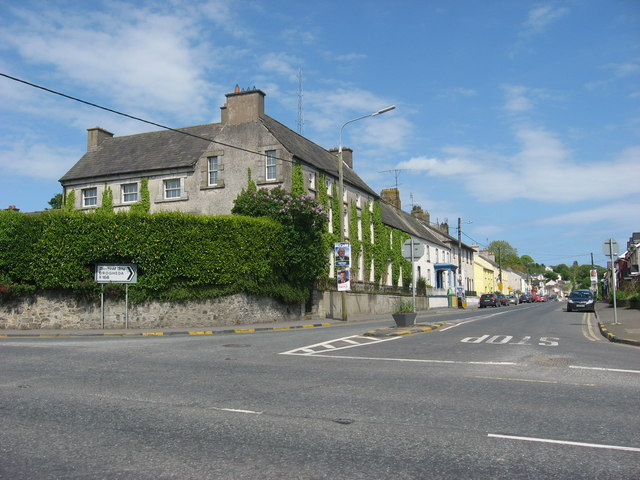
Collon House on Drogheda Street, at the crossroads

== Sport ==
Mattock Rangers, a local GAA club, were Louth Senior Football Champions in 2002, 2004, 2009 and 2010.

In 2015 Mattock, amalgamated with Hunterstown Rovers and Glen Emmets, won the under-21 county championship by defeating Noaimh Finbarrs/O'Connells on a scoreline of 0–15 to 0-06. In 2019, the club won the Leinster Intermediate Club Football Championship.

There is a karting track, WhiteRiver Karting, on the R169 (Dunleer) road at Mollyrue in Collon townland.

== See also ==
- Mellifont Abbey
- List of towns and villages in Ireland
- Market Houses in Ireland
