= James Emerson =

British Army officer

James Emerson VC
- Born: 3 August 1895; Collon, County Louth, Ireland
- Died: 6 December 1917 (aged 22); Hindenburg Line, near La Vacquerie, France
- Military career
- Allegiance: United Kingdom
- Branch: British Army
- Service years: – 1917 †
- Rank: Second Lieutenant
- Units: The Royal Inniskilling Fusiliers
- Conflicts: World War I: Western Front; Actions on the Hindenburg Line †
- Awards: Victoria Cross

James Samuel Emerson VC (3 August 1895 – 6 December 1917) was a British Army officer, and posthumous recipient of the Victoria Cross, the highest and most prestigious award for gallantry in the face of the enemy that can be awarded to British and Commonwealth forces.

Emerson was born 3 August 1895 in the village of Collon, County Louth in what is now the Republic of Ireland, to John and Ellen Emerson. When he was 22 years old, and a temporary second lieutenant in the 9th Battalion, The Royal Inniskilling Fusiliers (Tyrone Volunteers), British Army during the First World War, and was awarded the Victoria Cross for his actions on 6 December 1917, on the Hindenburg Line north of La Vacquerie, France. He died in action that same day.

For repeated acts of most conspicuous bravery. He led his company in an attack and cleared 400 yards of trench. Though wounded, when the enemy attacked in superior numbers, he sprang out of the trench with eight men and met the attack in the open, killing many and taking six prisoners. For three hours after this, all other Officers having become casualties, he remained with his company, refusing to go to the dressing station, and repeatedly repelled bombing attacks. Later, when the enemy again attacked in superior numbers, he led his men to repel the attack and was mortally wounded. His heroism, when worn out and exhausted from loss of blood, inspired his men to hold out, though almost surrounded, till reinforcements arrived and dislodged the enemy.

— The London Gazette, 12 February 1918

== Memorial ==
His name is inscribed on the war memorial at the Church of Ireland parish church at Collon, County Louth and on the Cambrai Memorial to the Missing.
