= Thomas Carroll (Greek Orthodox priest) =

Irish soldier and cleric

Fr. Thomas Carroll is an Irish priest in the Greek Orthodox Church. His parish in Dublin is part of the Greek Orthodox Archdiocese of Thyateira and Great Britain.

== Life ==
Thomas Carroll grew up in Co. Tipperary, to a Catholic family, with a strong military tradition, he served in the Irish Armed Forces as part of the UN Mission in Cyprus in the 1960s. Thomas Carroll was accepted into the Orthodox church on Palm Sunday 1986.

He took early retirement in 1996 going on to study Theology, with a view to becoming a Greek Orthodox priest. Fr Oeconomos Thomas Irenaeos Basil Carroll, was ordained a deacon and priest of the Orthodox church, the first Irish born person ordained. He is a graduate of St. Patrick's, Carlow College earning a BA degree in Humanities (Philosophy and Theology). He also holds a post graduate diploma in communications (Kairos/Maynooth) and a master's degree in Theology from the Pontifical University, Maynooth.

Since 2007 Fr Carroll has been responsible for the Church of the Annunciation in Arbour Hill in Dublin. Fr. Carroll represents the Greek Orthodox community at Irish state events such as the 1916 commemorations, world war commemorations etc.. He also represents the Church at the Irish and Dublin Council of Churches. After 17 years as parish priest in 2020 he retired as a full-time priest, but he still serves in the parish supporting the new priest in charge The Very Revd. Protopresbyter Ioannis Pantelides.
