= Nicholas Couris =

Father Nicholas Couris (born 1896 - died 3(16) August 1977) was an officer in the Imperial Russian Army, and combat veteran of the White Army during the Russian Civil War, and, in his old age, a priest of the Russian Orthodox Church Outside Russia stationed in Dublin, Ireland. Nicholas married Ksenia Nikolaevna Couris née Bibikova (1895-1966) in Constantinople before moving to England then they moved to Ireland in 1931 renting the old Courthouse in Collon and growing mushrooms. Their only son Illa died following an accident aged 9 in 1934. Nicholas set up a Russian Language school in the old Courthouse Collon, helped by his wife and his cousin Prince Paul Lieven. They taught Irish and British diplomats Russian, rumour has it he also taught some British spies Russian. Among those whom he taught Russian were the Irish diplomat and politician Conor Cruise O'Brien and the Church of Ireland Archbishop of Armagh Dr. George Simms, also the Cambridge spies Kim Philby, Guy Burgess, and Donald Maclean, visited Father Couriss and his school in Collon. Following the death of his wife, he moved to Dublin and lived with his sister Luba de Couris. He was ordained as a Russian Orthodox priest in New Your in 1967. Fr Couris' funeral took place in Saint Bartholomew’s Church, Dublin, and he was buried in the Church of Ireland graveyard, Collon, County Louth, alongside his wife and only son.
