= Religion in Northern Ireland =

Christianity is the largest religion in Northern Ireland. In the 2021 census, 79.7% of the Northern Irish population identified as Christians: Catholic (42.3%); Presbyterian (16.6%); Church of Ireland (11.5%); Methodist (2.4%); Other Christian (6.9%). Meanwhile, 1.3% of the population belonged to other religions, 17.4% stated they were non-religious and 1.5% did not state a religious or non-religious identity. The Catholic Church has seen a small growth in adherents, while the other recorded Christian groups have seen a decrease.

There are also small Muslim, Sikh, Hindu, Buddhist and Jewish communities. Belfast has a synagogue, a gurdwara, a mosque and two Hindu temples. There is another gurdwara in Derry.

Religion in Northern Ireland - 2021
1. Catholic Church (42.3%)
2. Non-religious (17.4%)
3. Presbyterian Church in Ireland (16.6%)
4. Church of Ireland (Anglican) (11.5%)
5. Methodist Church in Ireland (2.40%)
6. Other Christian (6.91%)
7. Other religion (1.30%)
8. Not stated (1.50%)
Percentages of the religiously raised (2021)
1. Catholicism (45.7%)
2. Other Christians (43.5%)
3. None (9.30%)
4. Other (1.50%)

== Statistics ==
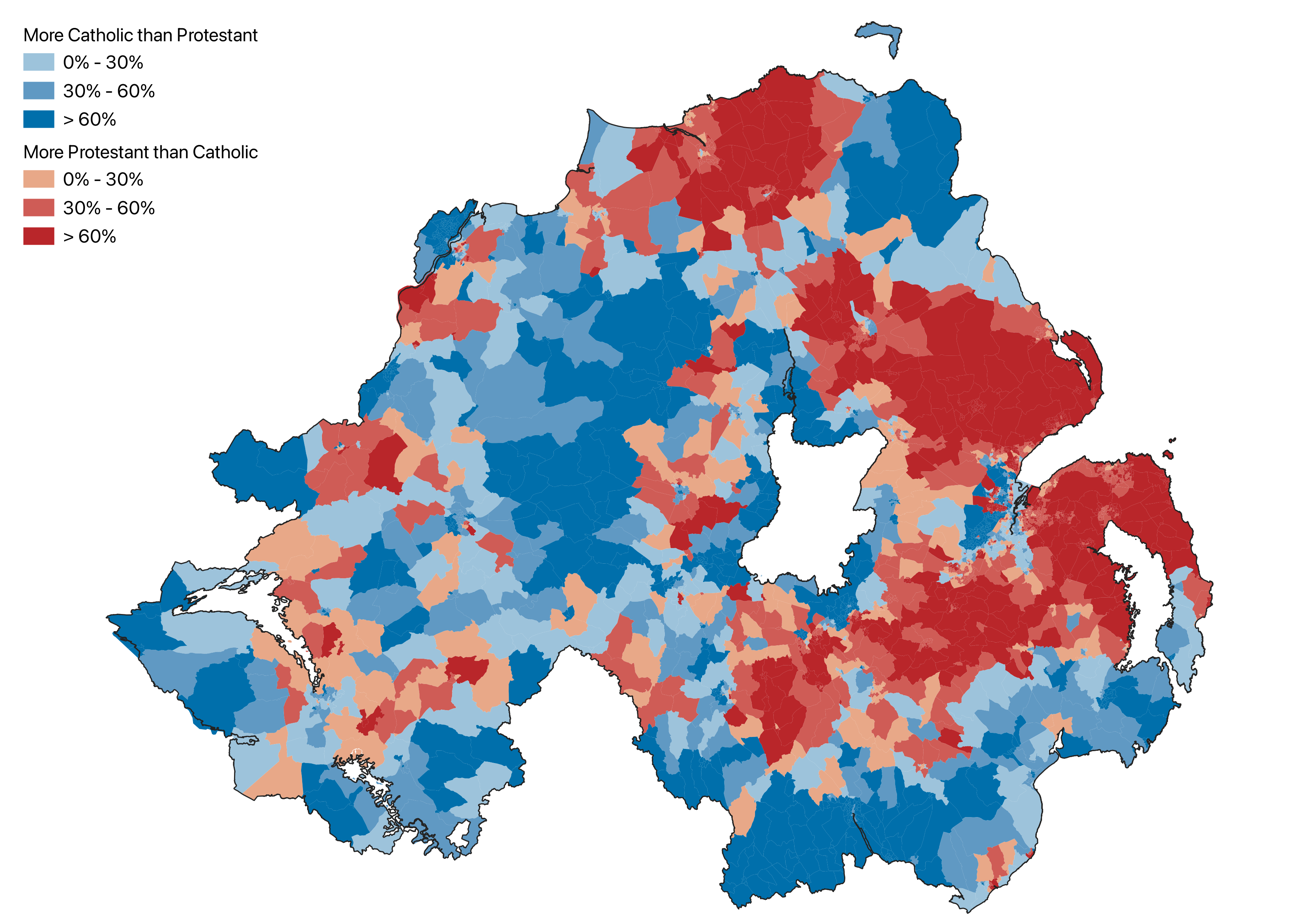
Map of religion or religion brought up in from the 2021 census in Northern Ireland.

The 2001, 2011, and 2021 Census figures for Religion (not Religion or Religion Brought Up In) are set out below.

Religion	2001		2011		2021	
Religion	Number	%	Number	%	Number	%
Catholic	678,462	40.2	738,033	40.8	805,151	42.3
Presbyterian	348,742	20.7	345,101	19.1	316,103	16.6
Church of Ireland	257,788	15.3	248,821	13.7	219,788	11.5
Methodist	59,173	3.5	54,253	3.0	44,725	2.4
Other Christian	102,221	6.1	104,380	5.8	130,385	6.9
(Total non-Catholic Christian)	767,924	45.6	752,555	41.6	711,001	37.4
(Total Christian)	1,446,386	85.8	1,490,588	82.3	1,516,152	79.7
Other religion	5,028	0.3	14,859	0.8	25,524	1.3
No religion	233,853	13.9	183,164	10.1	330,983	17.4
Religion not stated	233,853	13.9	122,252	6.8	30,529	1.6
Total population	1,685,267	100.0	1,810,863	100.0	1,903,188	100.0

As of the 2021 census, regarding religious background, four of the six traditional counties had a Catholic majority, one had a Protestant plurality, and one had a Protestant majority. For the religion currently being practiced, four counties have a Catholic majority and two have a Protestant plurality.

Religion or religious background of Northern Ireland residents by county
Religion / religion of upbringing	Antrim	Armagh	Londonderry	Down	Fermanagh	Tyrone							
Religion / religion of upbringing	Antrim	Armagh	Londonderry	Down	Fermanagh	Tyrone	Catholic	40.1%	58.2%	61.3%	32.3%	58.8%	66.5%
Protestant and other Christian	47.0%	34.0%	32.5%	53.5%	35.5%	28.9%							
Other religions	2.1%	1.2%	0.9%	1.5%	1.1%	0.6%							
No religion nor religious upbringing	10.8%	6.7%	5.3%	12.7%	4.6%	4.0%							
Religion currently practiced
Catholic	36.4%	55.1%	57.9%	28.8%	55.7%	63.8%							
Protestant and other Christian	40.1%	30.6%	29.1%	44.5%	32.2%	26.7%							
Other religions	1.8%	1.0%	0.8%	1.4%	0.9%	0.6%							
No religion nor religious upbringing	21.7%	13.3%	12.2%	25.3%	11.2%	9.0%							

The religious affiliations at different geographic levels of Northern Ireland were as follows in 2021. Blue is Catholic and red is Protestant and other Christians:

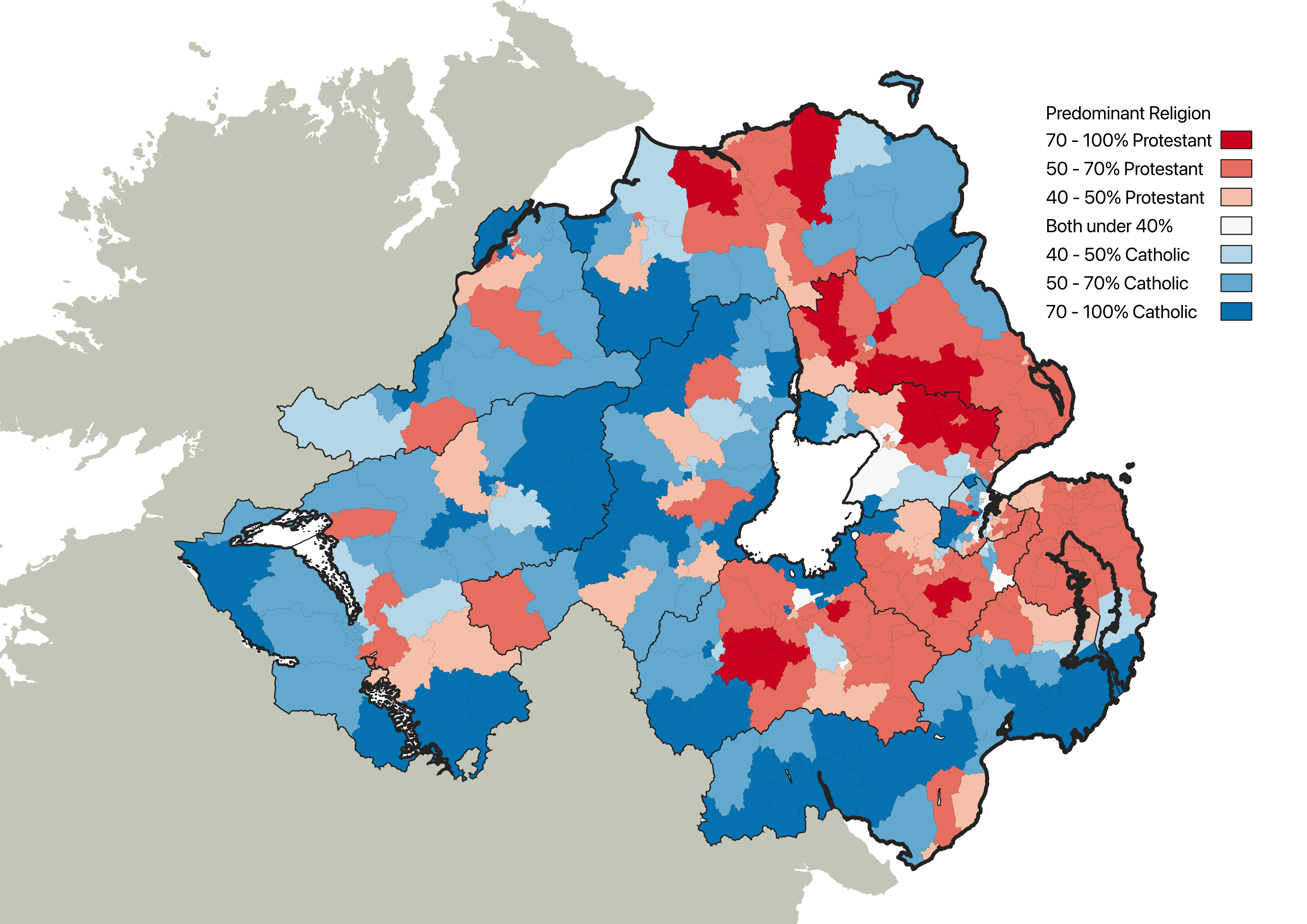
Wards of Northern Ireland by predominant religion at the 2021 census.

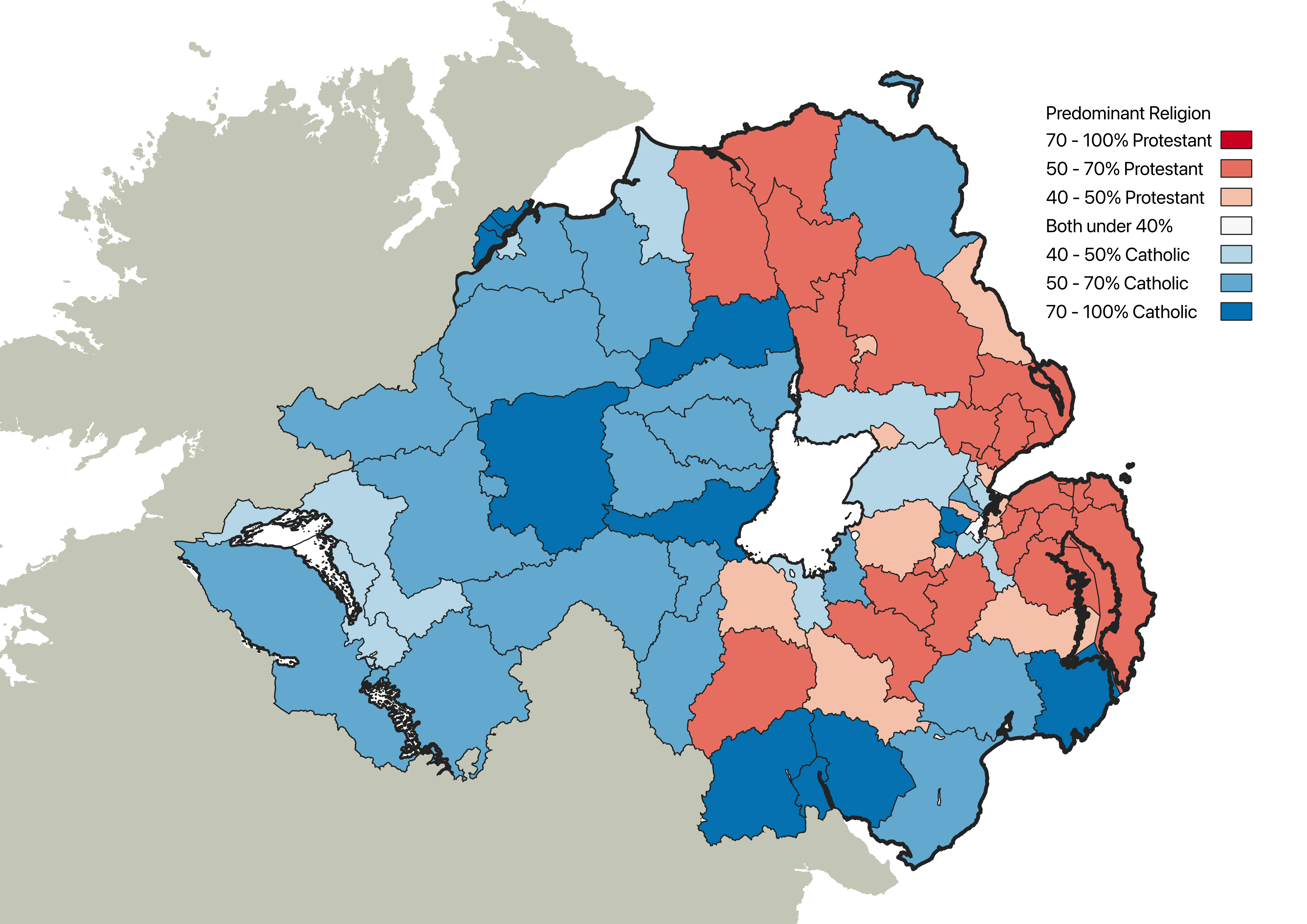
DEAs of Northern Ireland by predominant religion at the 2021 census.

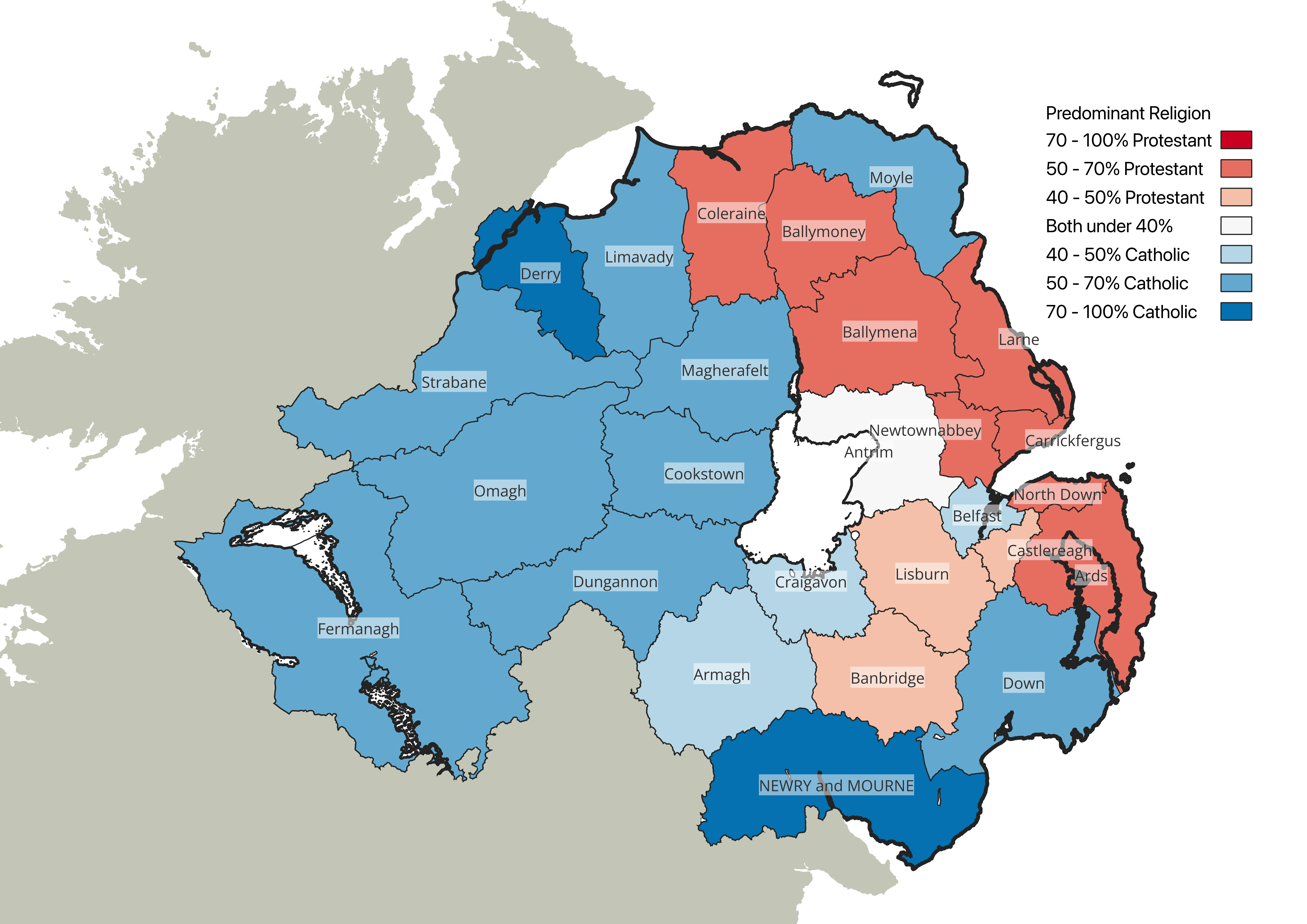
Pre-2015 Districts of Northern Ireland by predominant religion at the 2021 census.

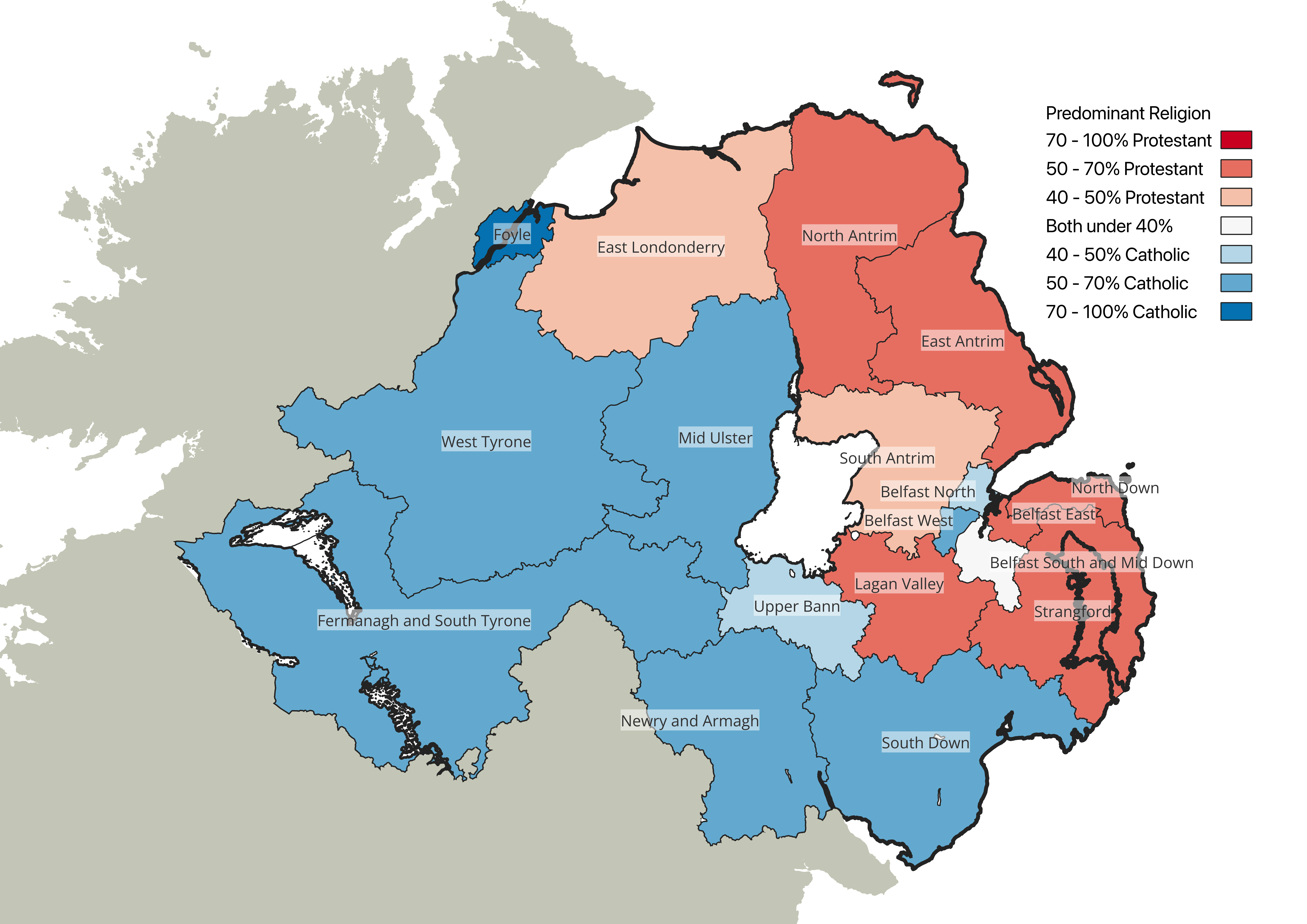
Parliamentary constituencies of Northern Ireland by predominant religion at the 2021 census.

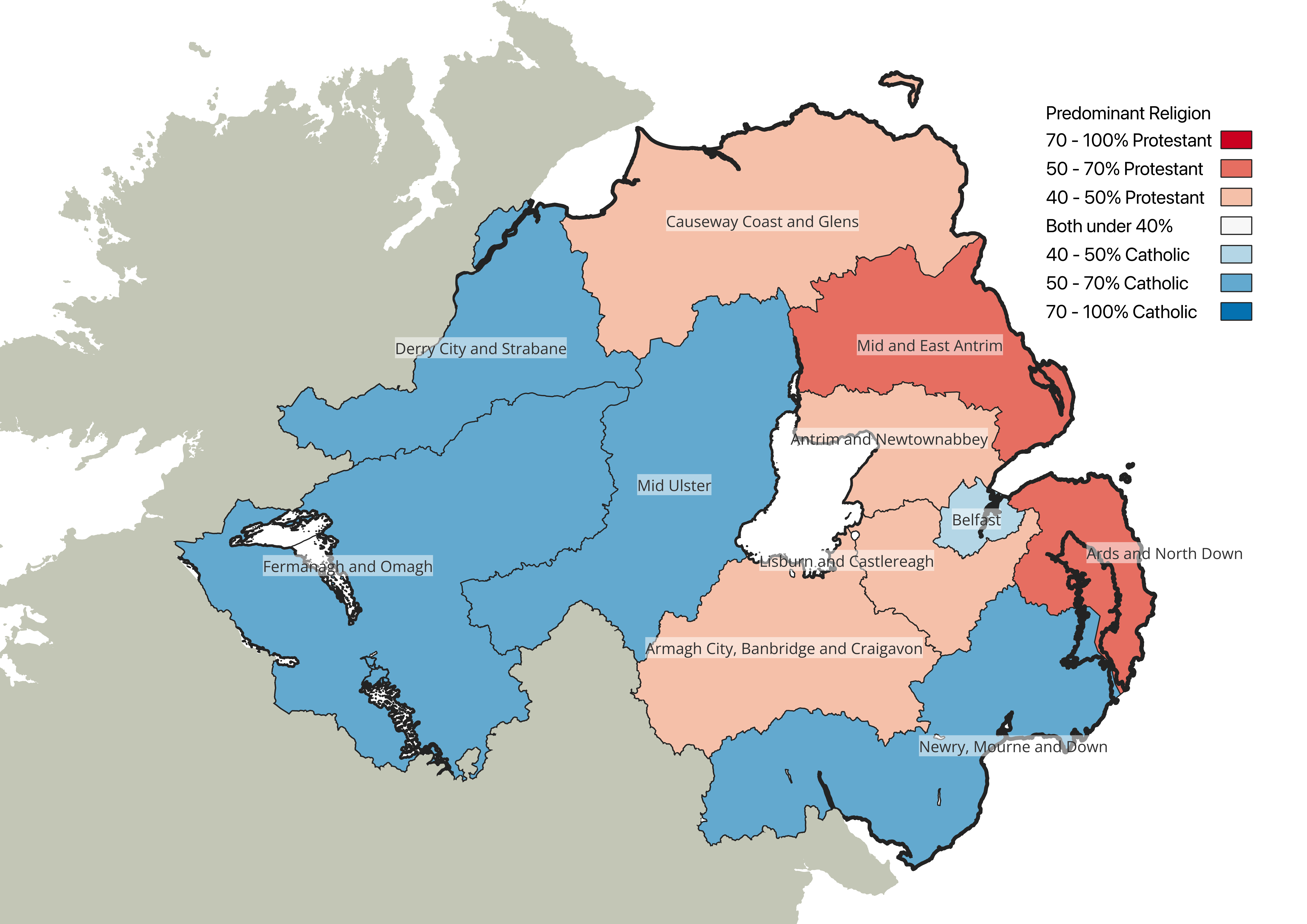
Current LG Districts of Northern Ireland by predominant religion at the 2021 census.

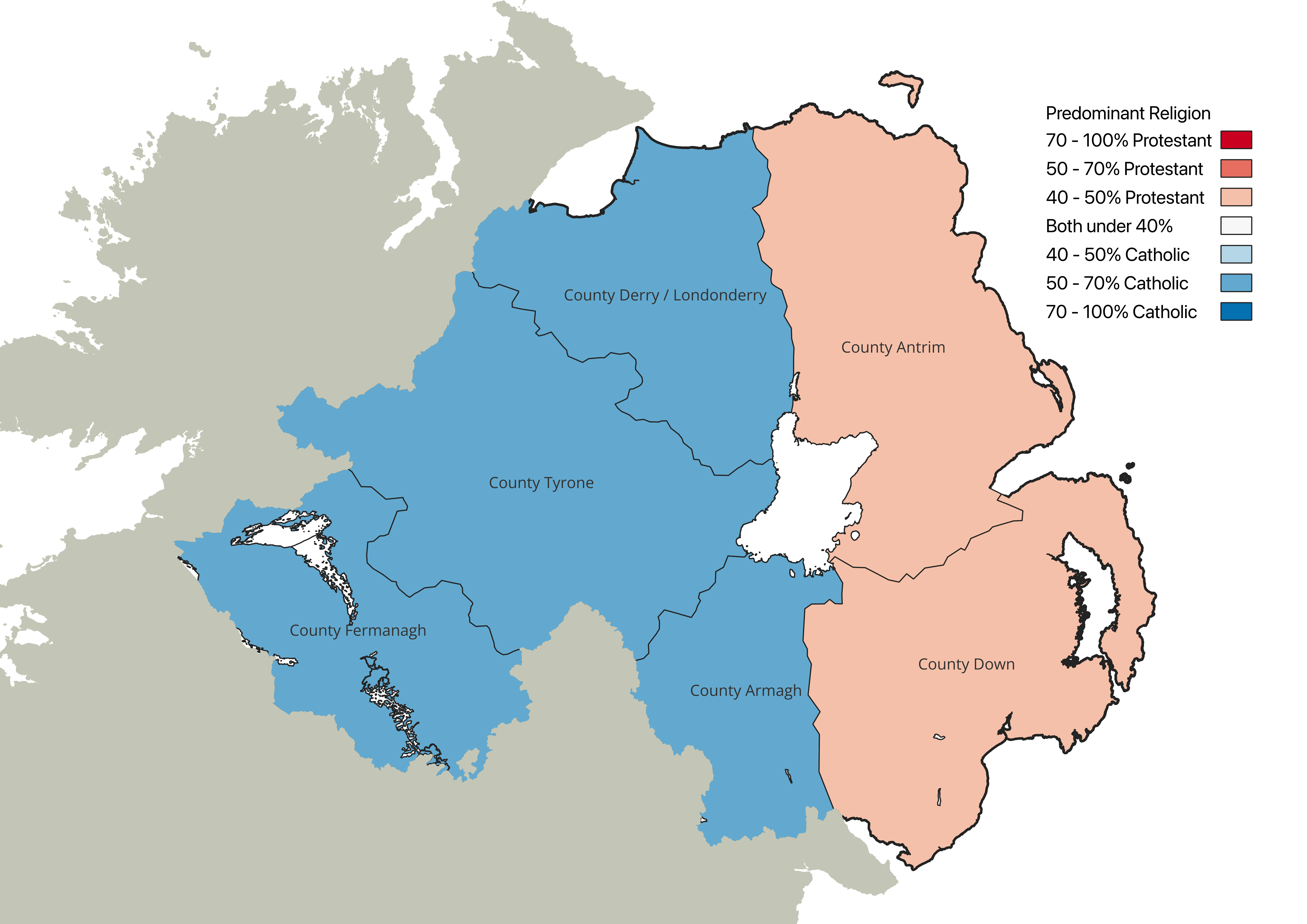
Counties of Northern Ireland by predominant religion at the 2021 census. Blue is Catholic and red is Protestant and other Christians.

District	2001			2011			2021		
District	Catholic	Protestant and other Christian	Other	Catholic	Protestant and other Christian	Other	Catholic	Protestant and other Christian	Other
Antrim	35.2%	47.2%	17.6%	37.5%	43.2%	19.2%	38.1%	39.0%	22.9%
Ards	10.4%	68.7%	20.9%	10.9%	65.4%	23.6%	10.9%	58.8%	30.3%
Armagh	45.4%	45.5%	9.1%	44.8%	43.0%	12.2%	46.4%	41.1%	12.5%
Ballymena	19.0%	67.8%	13.3%	20.4%	63.3%	16.3%	21.3%	58.4%	20.2%
Ballymoney	29.5%	59.1%	11.3%	29.6%	56.7%	13.6%	30.0%	53.8%	16.1%
Banbridge	28.6%	58.7%	12.7%	29.4%	55.3%	15.3%	31.0%	49.4%	19.5%
Belfast	42.1%	40.3%	17.5%	41.9%	34.1%	24.0%	42.5%	29.7%	27.8%
Carrickfergus	6.5%	70.4%	23.1%	7.6%	67.2%	25.2%	7.6%	59.5%	33.0%
Castlereagh	15.8%	64.9%	19.3%	19.5%	57.3%	23.2%	21.8%	48.4%	29.8%
Coleraine	24.1%	60.5%	15.4%	25.0%	56.8%	18.2%	25.3%	52.5%	22.2%
Cookstown	55.2%	38.0%	6.8%	55.1%	34.0%	11.0%	58.2%	31.8%	10.0%
Craigavon	41.7%	46.7%	11.6%	42.1%	42.1%	15.8%	43.4%	37.7%	18.9%
Derry	70.9%	20.8%	8.4%	67.4%	19.4%	13.1%	70.3%	18.0%	11.7%
Down	57.1%	29.2%	13.7%	57.5%	27.1%	15.4%	58.4%	24.8%	16.8%
Dungannon	57.3%	34.9%	7.7%	58.7%	29.8%	11.5%	62.6%	26.9%	10.5%
Fermanagh	55.5%	36.1%	8.4%	54.9%	34.3%	10.8%	55.8%	32.1%	12.1%
Larne	22.2%	61.9%	15.9%	21.8%	59.7%	18.5%	21.3%	54.7%	24.1%
Limavady	53.1%	36.1%	10.7%	56.0%	34.3%	9.7%	57.5%	31.7%	10.8%
Lisburn	30.1%	53.6%	16.4%	32.8%	47.9%	19.3%	35.2%	41.8%	23.0%
Magherafelt	61.5%	32.0%	6.5%	62.4%	28.3%	9.3%	65.0%	26.2%	8.8%
Moyle	56.6%	33.8%	9.6%	54.4%	32.3%	13.3%	54.3%	32.1%	13.6%
Newry and Mourne	75.9%	16.4%	7.7%	72.1%	15.2%	12.7%	75.1%	14.9%	10.0%
Newtownabbey	17.1%	64.5%	18.4%	19.9%	57.8%	22.3%	22.1%	51.0%	27.0%
North Down	10.0%	64.5%	25.5%	11.2%	60.3%	28.5%	11.6%	52.2%	36.2%
Omagh	65.1%	26.3%	8.6%	65.4%	24.8%	9.8%	67.7%	22.9%	9.5%
Strabane	63.1%	30.9%	6.0%	60.1%	30.7%	9.2%	63.0%	29.5%	7.5%

Religions broken down by place of birth in the 2021 census.

Map showing the proportion of the population in Northern Ireland who stated they had no religion in the 2011 census.

Place of birth	Catholic	Protestant and other Christian	Other religion	None or not stated
Northern Ireland	87.7%	91.7%	38.6%	77.1%
England	2.6%	3.1%	5.1%	8.1%
Scotland	0.5%	0.8%	0.8%	1.8%
Wales	0.1%	0.1%	0.2%	0.4%
Republic of Ireland	3.3%	1.0%	1.8%	1.6%
Other EU countries	4.1%	1.6%	4.4%	6.1%
Other non-EU European countries	0.1%	0.2%	2.1%	0.4%
Other	1.4%	1.1%	37.3%	3.8%

The religious affiliations in the different age bands in the 2011 census were as follows:

Ages attained (years)	2011				2021			
Ages attained (years)	Catholic	Protestant and other Christian	Other	None	Catholic	Protestant and other Christian	Other	None
0 to 4	44.3%	31.7%	0.9%	23.2%	46.5%	27.2%	1.6%	24.7%
5 to 9	45.5%	36.1%	0.7%	17.7%	47.7%	30.8%	1.6%	19.9%
10 to 14	45.9%	37.9%	0.6%	15.6%	47.8%	32.9%	1.4%	18.0%
15 to 19	44.8%	37.6%	0.6%	17.0%	45.7%	32.7%	1.3%	20.3%
20 to 24	43.4%	35.2%	0.7%	20.7%	42.8%	29.5%	1.6%	26.1%
25 to 29	44.8%	33.1%	1.1%	21.0%	40.9%	29.3%	1.7%	28.1%
30 to 34	44.0%	34.3%	1.4%	20.3%	42.2%	29.8%	2.1%	25.9%
35 to 39	41.5%	37.8%	1.2%	19.5%	44.9%	31.2%	2.1%	21.9%
40 to 44	40.4%	41.1%	0.9%	17.7%	44.3%	33.6%	1.8%	20.3%
45 to 49	40.0%	42.8%	0.8%	16.3%	42.5%	37.3%	1.4%	18.7%
50 to 54	39.2%	44.9%	0.7%	15.1%	41.5%	41.0%	1.0%	16.4%
55 to 59	38.1%	46.5%	0.8%	14.6%	41.2%	42.8%	0.9%	15.1%
60 to 64	35.8%	50.0%	0.7%	13.4%	40.2%	44.9%	0.8%	14.1%
65 to 69	33.7%	54.4%	0.7%	11.2%	39.1%	46.5%	0.7%	13.7%
70 to 74	32.9%	56.4%	0.7%	10.1%	36.2%	51.1%	0.7%	12.0%
75 to 79	32.0%	58.1%	0.6%	9.3%	34.0%	55.6%	0.6%	9.7%
80 to 84	30.0%	60.0%	0.6%	9.3%	32.9%	58.2%	0.6%	8.3%
85 to 89	28.1%	61.8%	0.5%	9.6%	31.9%	60.0%	0.6%	7.4%
90 and over	25.8%	64.0%	0.5%	9.6%	29.3%	62.7%	0.6%	7.4%
Median Age	32	41	34	30	36	46	32	32

Raw data
The percentage of respondents in each religious category of the census in Northern Ireland (or the area that would later become Northern Ireland).
There was a high level of non-enumeration during the 1981 census, mainly due to protests in Catholic areas regarding the 1981 Irish hunger strike.
Distribution of religions in Northern Ireland according to the 2011 census.
Catholic

Presbyterian Church in Ireland

Church of Ireland

Methodist Church in Ireland

Other Christian

Other Religion

== Christianity ==
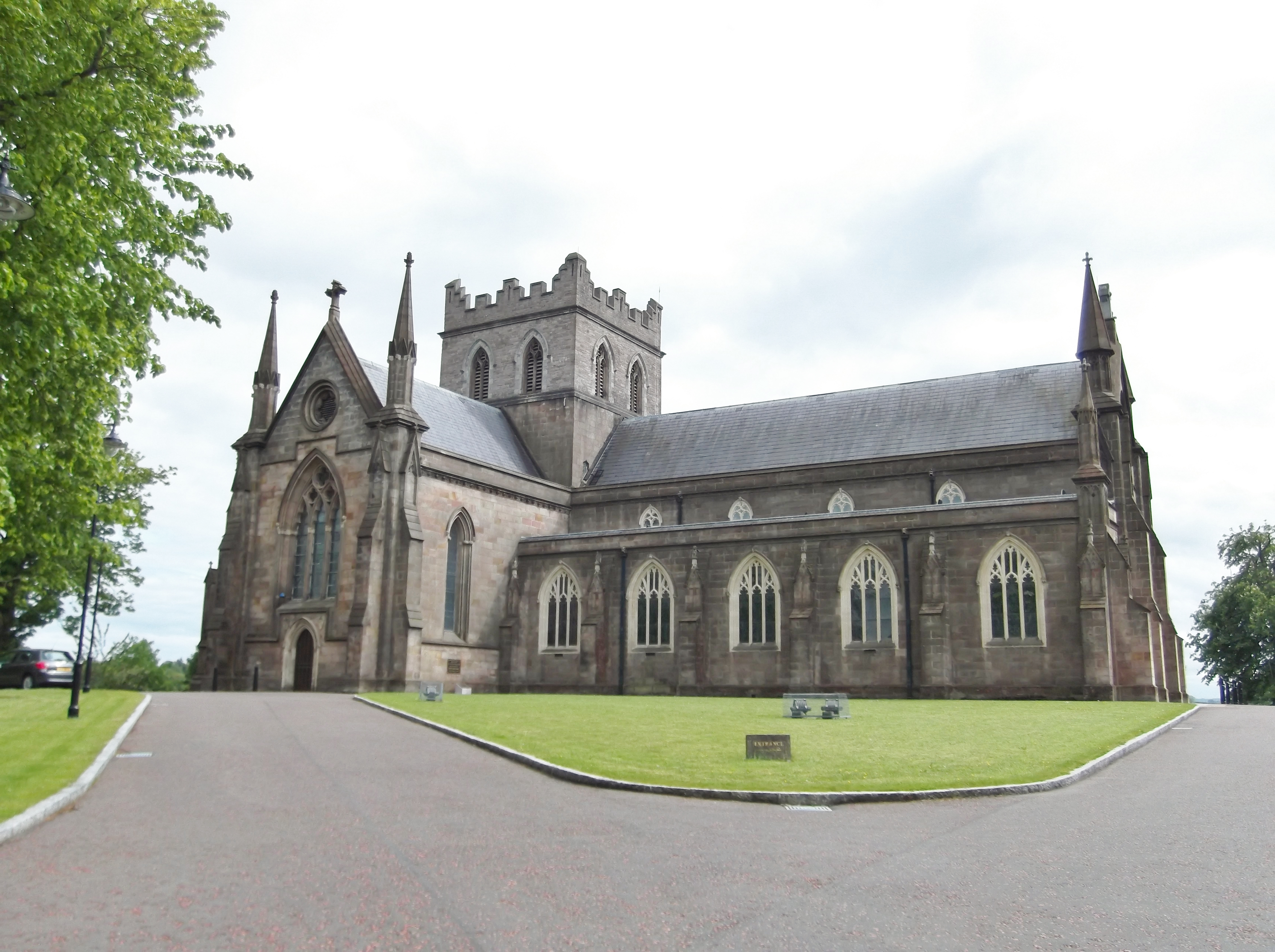
St Patrick's Cathedral, Armagh (Church of Ireland) is the seat of the head of the Anglican Church of Ireland.

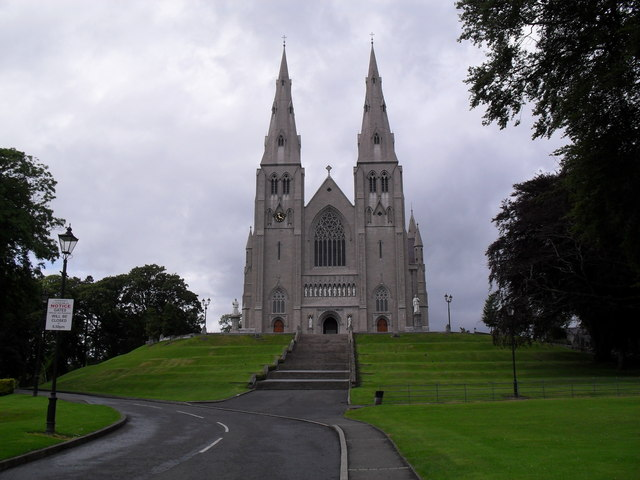
St Patrick's Cathedral, Armagh (Catholic) is the seat of the head of the Catholic Archdiocese of Armagh.

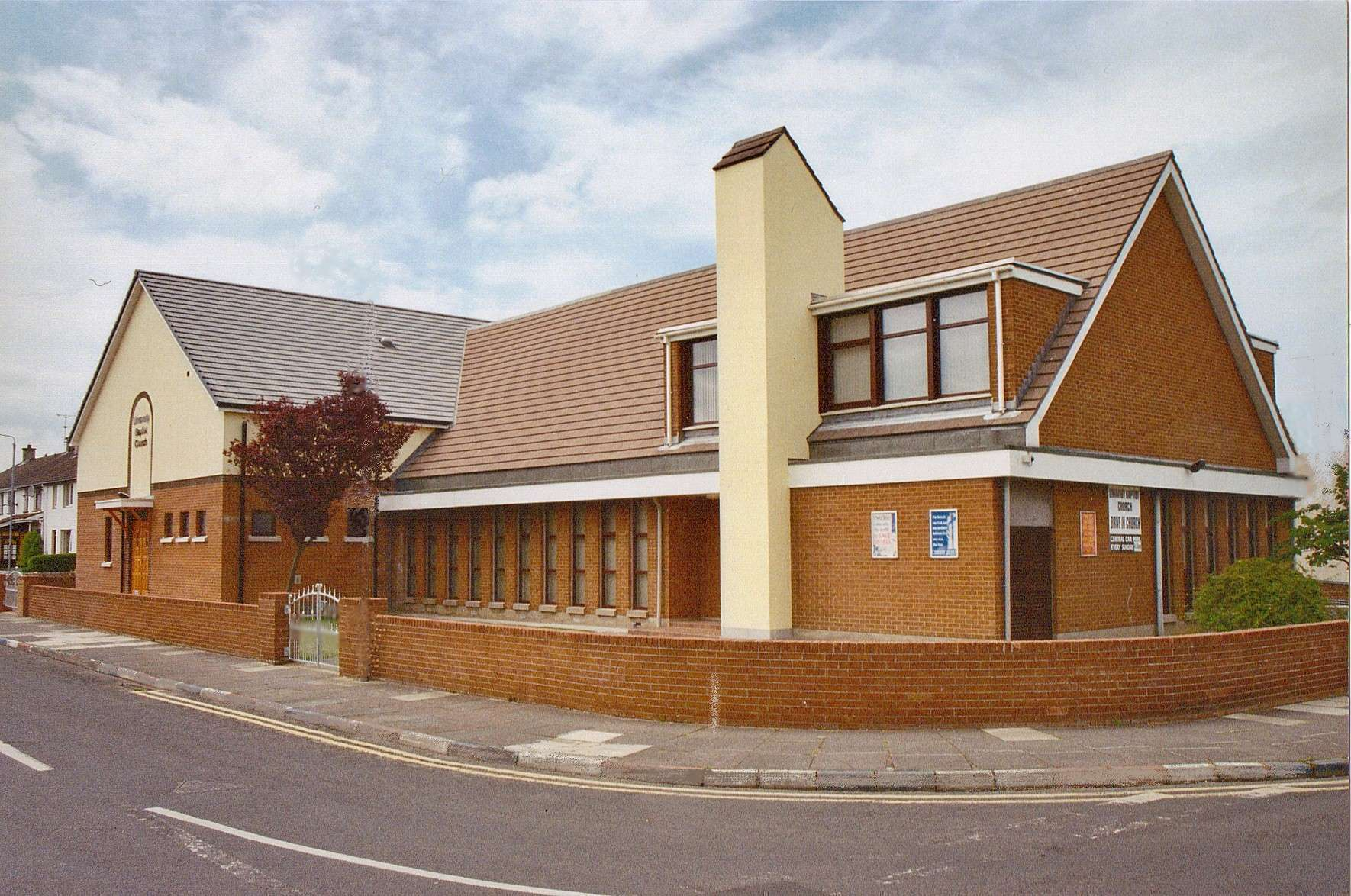
A Baptist church in Limavady, County Londonderry.

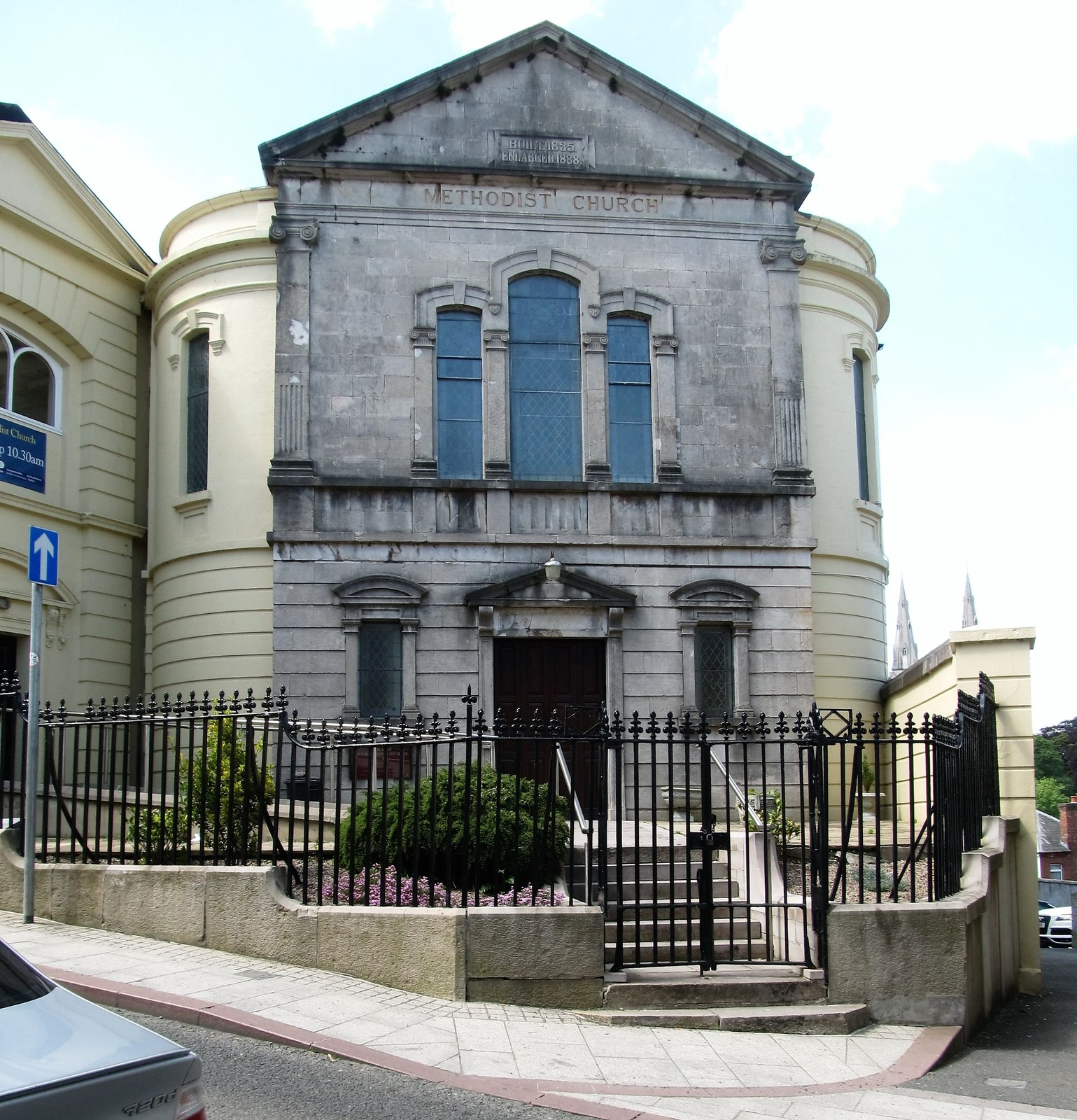
Armagh Methodist Church

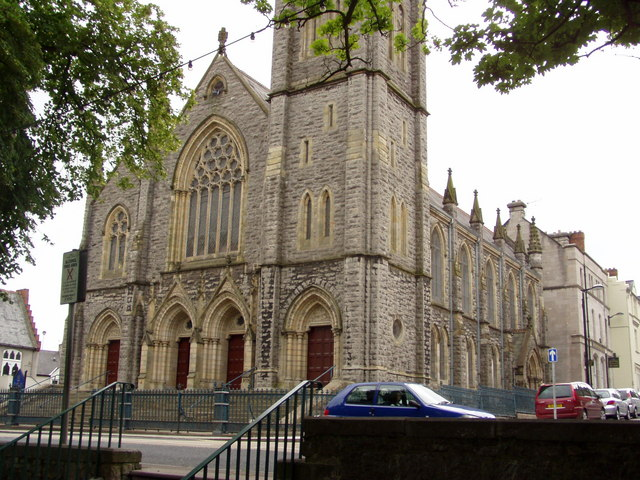
First Armagh Presbyterian Church

Christianity is the main religion in Northern Ireland. The 2011 UK census showed 40.8% Catholic, 19.1% Presbyterian Church, with the Church of Ireland having 13.7% and the Methodist Church 5.0%. Members of other Christian churches comprised 5.8%, 17% stated they have no religion or did not state a religion, and members of non-Christian religions were 0.8%.

The Catholic Church is the largest single church. The Church is organised into four provinces though these are not coterminous with the modern political division of Ireland. The seat of the Archbishop of Armagh, the Primacy of Ireland, is St. Patrick's Cathedral, Armagh.

The Presbyterian Church in Ireland, closely -but not formally - linked to the Church of Scotland in terms of theology and history, is the second-largest church and largest Protestant denomination. It is followed by the Anglican Church of Ireland, which was the state church of Ireland until it was disestablished by the Irish Church Act 1869. In 2002, the much smaller Methodist Church in Ireland signed a covenant for greater co-operation and potential ultimate unity with the Church of Ireland. The Church of Ireland is part of the Anglican Communion.

Smaller Protestant denominations such as the Free Presbyterian Church of Ulster, Reformed Presbyterian Church of Ireland amongst Presbyterians and the Open Brethren exist in many rural communities. The Association of Baptist Churches in Ireland and the Assemblies of God Ireland are also organised on an all-Ireland basis, though in the case of the Assemblies of God this was the result of a recent reorganisation.

=== Comparison with Great Britain ===
In the 2011 census Northern Ireland had substantially more people stating that they were Christian (82.2%) than did England (59.4%), Scotland (53.8%) or Wales (57.6%). The proportion who stated that they had any religion was also higher in Northern Ireland (83%) than in England (68.1%), Scotland (56.3%) or Wales (60.3%). In Northern Ireland those who did not state any religion in the 2011 census amounted to 13.9% of the population, lower than in England (31.9%), Scotland (43.7%) or Wales (39.7%). This represented an increase from the 2001 census in those not stating a religion of 11.7% in Northern Ireland, lower than the increases in England (54.5%), Scotland (38.1%) or Wales (57.6%).

Secularisation in Northern Ireland has followed different paths within each of the two main communities, being at a more advanced stage within the mainly Protestant community in which it is reflected more often with a formal move away from the churches and by expressing no formal religious attachment, mirroring the pattern in Great Britain, whereas in the mainly Catholic community it is reflected by declining mass attendance but often with retaining a formal Catholic identification, mirroring the pattern in the Republic of Ireland. Those stating that they had no religion in the 2011 census were concentrated in largely Protestant areas, suggesting that they were mostly from a Protestant background.

=== Comparison with the Republic of Ireland ===
In their respective 2011 censuses Northern Ireland had a lower proportion of people stating that they were Christian (82.3%) than the Republic of Ireland (90.4%) and had a higher proportion of people stating that they had no religion or not indicating a religious belief (16.9%) than the Republic of Ireland (7.6%). While in the 2011 census 84.2% of people in the Republic of Ireland identified themselves as Catholic in the 2011 census in Northern Ireland only 40.8% identified themselves as Catholic.

== Minor religions ==
=== Islam ===
The bulk of Muslims in Northern Ireland today come from families who have immigrated since the late 20th century. At the time of the 2011 Census there were 3,832 living in Northern Ireland, although by the 2021 census, the Muslim population stood at 10,870 (or 0.57% of the population). The Belfast Islamic Centre states that roughly half of the Muslim population lives in Belfast alone. The Muslims in Northern Ireland come from over 40 countries of origin, from Western Europe all the way through to the Far East. This situation is reflected in comparably complex institutional arrangements.

=== Judaism ===
The earliest recorded Jew living in Northern Ireland was a tailor by the name of Manuel Lightfoot in 1652. The first Jewish congregation in Northern Ireland, Belfast Hebrew Congregation, was founded in 1870. In 2006, there were an estimated 300 Jewish people living in Northern Ireland.

=== Baháʼí Faith ===
The Baháʼí Faith in Northern Ireland begins after a century of contact between Irishmen and Baháʼís beyond the island and on the island. The members of the religion elected its first Baháʼí Local Spiritual Assembly in 1949 in Belfast. The Baháʼís held an international conference in Dublin in 1982 which was described as “…one of the very few occasions when a world event for a faith community has been held in Ireland". By 1993 there were a dozen assemblies in Northern Ireland. By 2005 Baháʼí sources claim some 300 Baháʼís across Northern Ireland.

=== Hinduism ===
Hinduism is a relatively minor religion in Northern Ireland with only around 200 Hindu families in the region. There are, however, three Mandirs in Belfast and by the 2021 census the Hindu population had risen to 4,190 (or 0.22% of the population).

== History ==
=== The Troubles ===
The Troubles were a period of ethno-political conflict in Northern Ireland which spilled over at various times into Great Britain and the Republic of Ireland. The duration of the Troubles is conventionally dated from approximately 1968 to the signing of the Belfast Agreement in 1998. Violence nonetheless continued beyond this period and still manifests on a small-scale basis.

The principal issues at stake in the Troubles were the constitutional status of Northern Ireland and the relationship between the mainly Protestant Unionist and mainly Catholic Nationalist communities in Northern Ireland. The Troubles had both political and military (or paramilitary) dimensions. Its participants included politicians and political activists on both sides, republican and loyalist paramilitary organisations, the Royal Ulster Constabulary, the British Army and the security forces of the Republic of Ireland.

== See also ==
- Demographics of Northern Ireland
- Religion in the United Kingdom
- Religion in the Republic of Ireland
