= A. C. Roxburgh =

British dermatologist and physician

Archibald Cathcart Roxburgh (17 August 1886 – 3 December 1954) was a British dermatologist and physician who served as the physician in charge of the skin department at St Bartholomew's Hospital from 1928 to 1946. He wrote the textbook Common Skin Diseases first published in 1932.

== Early life ==
Roxburgh was born in Valparaíso, Chile and educated at Charterhouse School, Trinity College, Cambridge and St Bartholomew's Hospital.

== Medical career ==
After serving as a temporary surgeon in the Royal Navy during World War I, Roxburgh joined the skin department at St Bartholomew's Hospital. He was chief assistant from 1919 to 1927, assistant physician from 1927 to 1928, and physician in charge from 1928 until 1946. He was also physician at St John's Hospital for Diseases of the Skin from 1924 to 1935 and dean of the London School of Dermatology from 1924 to 1930.

Roxburgh was president of the British Association of Dermatologists in 1946 and editor of its journal from 1930 to 1938. He also served as president of the dermatology section of the Royal Society of Medicine from 1943 to 1945.

Roxburgh was the author of Common Skin Diseases, first published in 1932. At the time of Roxburgh's death, a tenth edition was forthcoming, and The Lancet described the book as "a practical vade-mecum for the dermatologist". The textbook reached a nineteenth edition in 2022 and is now published as Roxburgh's Common Skin Diseases.

== Personal life ==
In 1916, Roxburgh married Grace Mary Blanche Lambert, daughter of Lieutenant-Colonel J. A. Lambert. They had three sons, all of whom became doctors, and a daughter who married a son of the physician Geoffrey Evans.

His younger brother was J. F. Roxburgh, the first headmaster of Stowe School.
