= Frank Hartley =

Frank Hartley may refer to:

- Frank Hartley (American football) (born 1967), former American football player
- Frank Hartley (footballer) (1896–1965), English footballer
- Sir Frank Hartley (pharmacist) (1911–1997), pharmacist and Vice-Chancellor of the University of London
- Frank Robinson Hartley (born 1942), Vice-Chancellor of Cranfield University
- F. J. Hartley (1909–1971), known as Frank, Australian Methodist minister
