= Lubber fiend =

Creature from English folklore

The lubber fiend, Lob, lubberkin, lurdane or Lob Lie-By-The-Fire is a legendary creature of English folklore that is similar to the "brownie" (or "Urisk") of Scotland and northern England, the "hob" of northern England and the Scottish Borders, the Slavic "domovoi" and Scandinavian "tomte". It has been related also to Robin Goodfellow, and Hobgoblins. It is best known for being mentioned by John Milton in his pastoral poem, "L'Allegro".

The lubberkin is typically described as a large, hairy man with a tail who performs housework in exchange for a saucer of milk and a place in front of the fire. One story claims he is the giant son of a witch and the Devil.

The abbey lubber is a minor demon that haunts the wine cellars and kitchens of abbeys, tempting the monks into drunkenness, gluttony and lasciviousness. The best known abbey lubber tale is that of Friar Rush.

== Lubber fiend in literature ==
The lubber fiend appears also in The Red Axe by S. R. Crockett (1900):

That fool, Jan Lubber Fiend, will ever be at his tricks. 'Tis my young mistress that encourages him, more is the pity! For poor serving-men are held responsible for his knavish on-goings. Why, I had just set him cross-legged in the yard with a basket of pease to shell, seeing how he grows as much as a foot in the night—or near by. But so soon as my back is turned he will be forever answering the door and peeping out into the street to gather the mongrel boys about him. 'Tis a most foul Lubber Fiend to keep about an honest house, plaguing decent folks withal!

Lob is the title of a poem by Edward Thomas.

It also appears in Lob Lie-By-The-Fire by Juliana H. Ewing, Troll Fell by Katherine Langrish, Abbeychurch by Charlotte M. Yonge and Dear Brutus by J. M. Barrie (as "Lob, the ancient Puck").

A creature called a lubberkin appears in The Witcher 3: Wild Hunt, in which it is a type of protective household spirit (a kłobuk from Slavic folklore). The title character Geralt explicitly compares it to a hob.

== See also ==
- Leprechaun
- Wirry-cow
