= Thomas Creed =

Thomas Creed may refer to:

- Thomas Creede (fl. 1593–1617), English printer
- Thomas Percival Creed (1897–1969), lawyer and educationist
