= Magee College =

Campus of Ulster University in Derry, Northern Ireland

Ulster University at Magee aka Ulster University, Magee Campus
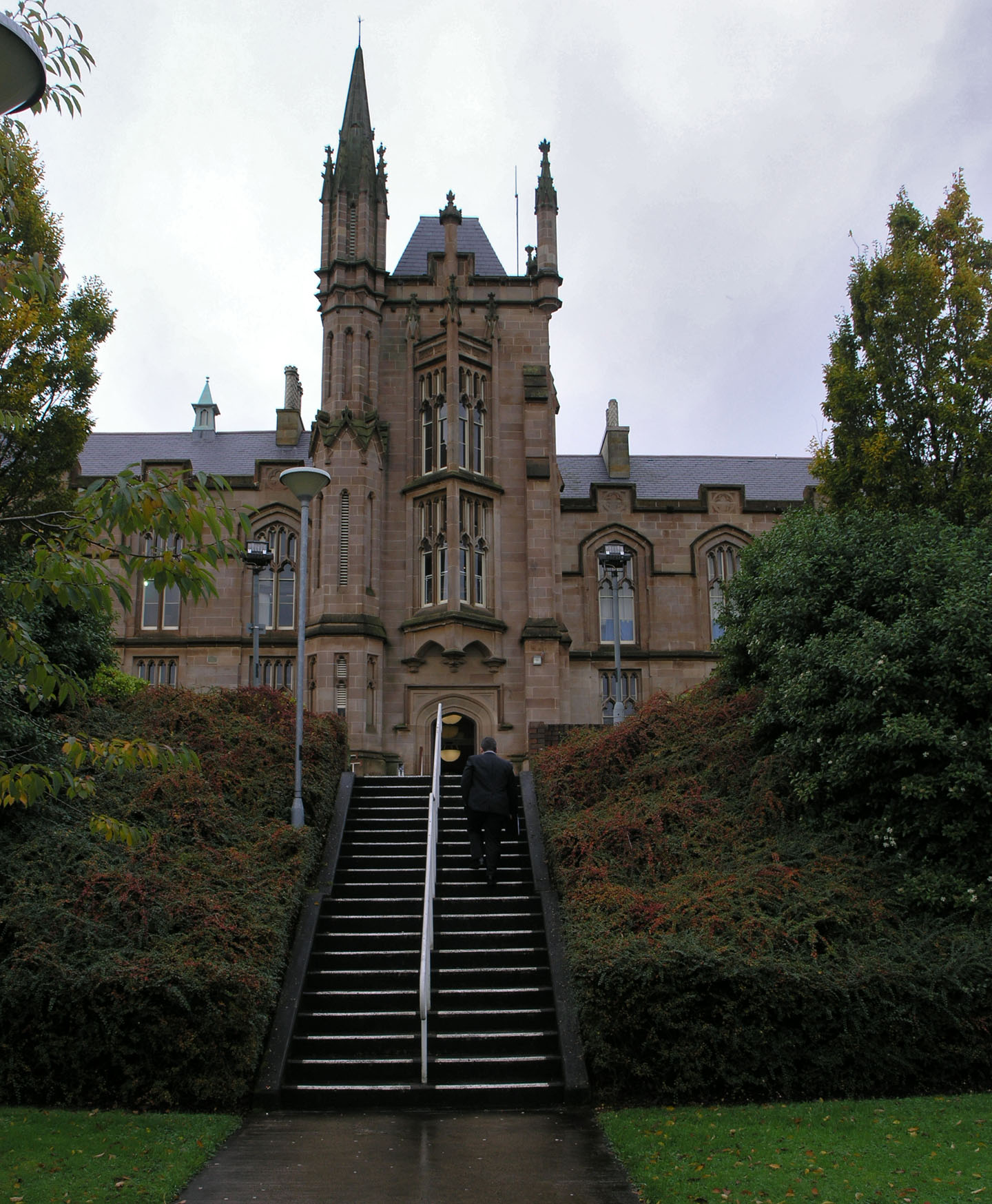
- The Magee main building
- Former names: University of Ulster at Magee, New University of Ulster at Magee; Magee University College; Magee College
- Type: Public research university
- Established: 1865 – Magee College; 1953 – Magee University College; 1968 – Coleraine Campus established; New University of Ulster established 1969 – Magee College merge 1982 – Ulster Polytechnic merge; University of Ulster established 2014 – Ulster University rebrand
- Affiliations: Ulster University
- Endowment: £6.483 million (2014)
- Budget: £185m
- Chancellor: Colin Davidson
- Vice-Chancellor: Professor Paul Bartholomew
- Students: 6,500 (2025/26)
- Location: Derry, County Londonderry, Northern Ireland, UK; 55.006°N 7.323°W
- Colours: Logo:Navy blue & Bronze Seal:Red & Gold Formerly:Navy blue, Blue & Green
- Website: www.ulster.ac.uk/ulster-life/campuses/magee

The Ulster University Derry~Londonderry campus, better known as Magee College, is one of the four campuses of Ulster University. It is located in Derry, Northern Ireland, and was opened in 1865 as a Presbyterian Christian arts and theological college. Since 1953, it has had no religious affiliation and provides a broad range of undergraduate and postgraduate academic degree programmes in disciplines ranging from business, law, social work, creative arts & technologies, cinematic arts, design, computer science and computer games to psychology and nursing.

== Academics ==
It offers a large number of undergraduate and postgraduate programmes through Ulster University's four faculties:

1. Arts, Humanities and Social Sciences
2. Computing, Engineering and the Built Environment
3. Life and Health Sciences
4. Ulster Business School

Within each faculty there are a number of schools offering programmes for their relative disciplines. The schools based on the Derry~Londonderry campus are:

1. Arts, Humanities and Social Sciences – School of Arts and Humanities, School of Education, School of Law, School of Applied Social and Policy Studies
2. Computing, Engineering & the Built Environment – School of Computing, Engineering and Intelligent Systems
3. Life and Health Sciences – School of Nursing and Paramedic Science, School of Psychology, School of Health Sciences, School of Medicine
4. Ulster Business School – Department of Global Business and Enterprise

Programmes taught include business studies, drama, law, social work, Irish, cinematic arts, education, cinematic arts, computer science, computer games, creative technologies, robotics, electronics, music, nursing, stratified medicine, youth work, history, politics, sociology, criminology, education, and medicine.

=== Research ===
Research activities include several research institutes and centres.

Derry~Londonderry Campus is a hub for research in the Faculty of Arts Humanities and Social Sciences especially in Social Work, Criminology and Applied Social Studies, Creative Arts and Technologies, Irish Language & Literature and history.

It is also the location for the Intelligent Systems Research Centre (ISRC) dedicated to the creation of intelligent computational systems through research in neural networks, fuzzy systems, artificial intelligence and cognitive robotics. Other research areas include ambient intelligence, wireless sensor networks, robot vision, brain computer interfacing and serious games.

The university also houses International Conflict Research (INCORE), a joint venture between the United Nations University and Ulster University. Established in 1993, it aims to address issues of the conflict in Northern Ireland and seek to promote conflict resolution internationally. The Transitional Justice Institute is based at both the Magee and Belfast campuses. Professor Élise Féron was appointed as INCORE Director in 2025.

=== Provost ===
The principal academic post at the campus is the provost. Professor Thomas G Fraser was provost from 2002 to 2006, succeeded by Professor Jim Allen. In 2011, Professor Deirdre Heenan was appointed to the post in 2011, following the retirement of Professor Allen. She was replaced by Professor Malachy O'Neil in 2016. In 2023, the university consolidated the role of Provost for the entire institution. This role is now held by Professor Cathy Gormley Heenan.

== History ==
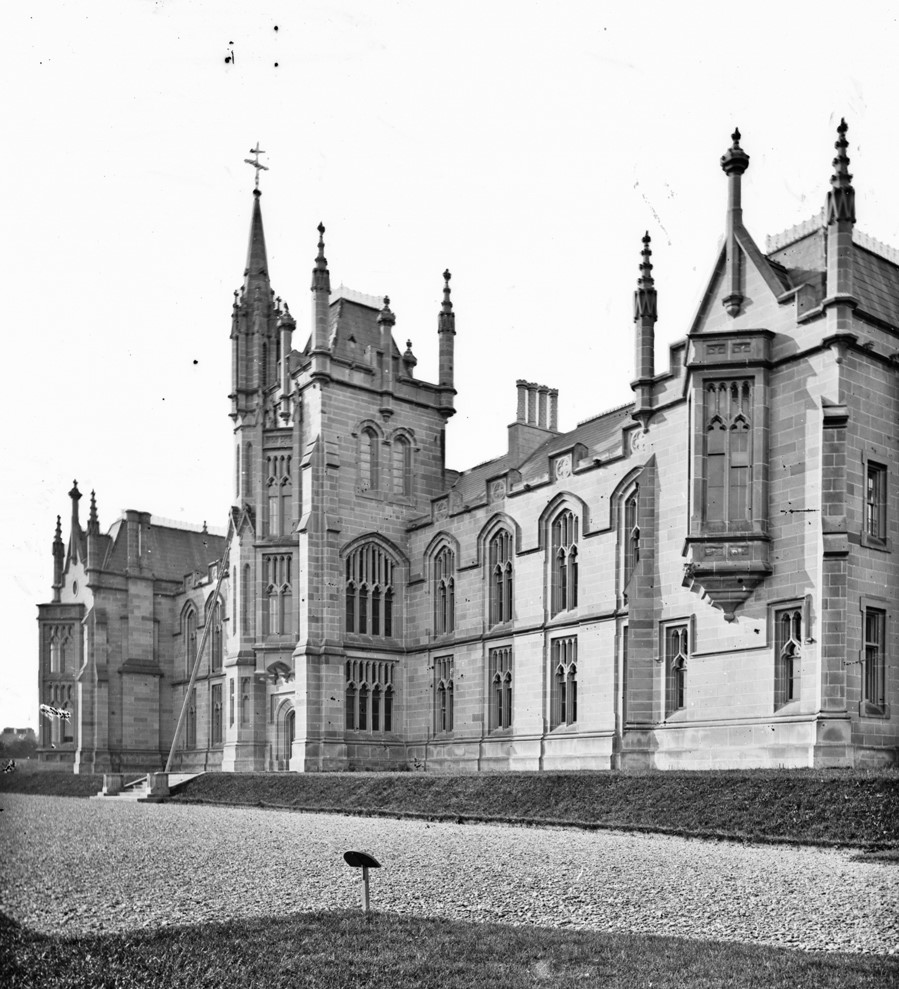
Magee College, c.1870

The initial name for the Campus (Magee Campus) originated from Martha Magee, the widow of a Presbyterian minister, who, in 1845, bequeathed £20,000 to the Presbyterian Church of Ireland to found a college for theology and the arts. It opened in 1865 primarily as a theological college, but accepted students from all denominations to study a variety of subjects. It was a college of the Royal University of Ireland from 1880 and later became associated with the Trinity College, Dublin when the Royal University was dissolved in 1909 and replaced by the National University of Ireland. The Irish Roman Catholic bishops had in 1871 implemented a general ban on Catholics entering Trinity College, with few exceptions. This ban remained in place until it was rescinded by the Catholic Bishops of Ireland in 1970. By that time, Magee College had severed its links with TCD, as set out below.

=== Second World War: Royal Navy ===
During the Second World War, the college was taken over by The Admiralty for Royal Navy operational use, becoming with Ebrington Barracks (HMS Ferret), a major facility in the Battle of the Atlantic. A 2013 BBC report describes a secret major control bunker, later buried beneath the lawns of the college. From 1941 this bunker, part of Base One Europe, together with similar bunkers in Derby House, Liverpool, and Whitehall was used to control one million Allied personnel and fight the Nazi U-boat threat.

On 14 September 2013 Magee hosted the 23rd International Loebner Prize Contest in Artificial Intelligence based on The Turing Test.

Lady Winifred Peck (née Knox), mother of Julian Peck (who resided at Prehen House in Derry), was a sister of Dilly Knox who directed the code breaking at Bletchley Park. Sir Harry Hinsley OBE was Director of Studies at Cambridge University to Professor Robert Gavin, a former Provost of Magee.

Dame Alice Rosemary Murray, the first female Vice-Chancellor of Cambridge University, who also sat on the Lockwood Committee (1963–65) which recommended the closure of Magee as well as the location of Northern Ireland's 2nd University being Coleraine (February 1965), from which she was later awarded a Doctor of Science (DSc) Honorary Degree (1972), was stationed at Base One Europe as WRNS Chief Officer and responsible for the welfare of 5,600 Wrens stationed at Londonderry.

=== Postwar ===
In 1953, Magee Theological College separated from the remainder of the college, eventually moving to Belfast in a 1978 merger that formed Union Theological College. Also in 1953, Magee College broke its links with Dublin and became Magee University College. It was hoped by groups led by the University for Derry Committee that this university college would become Northern Ireland's second university after Queen's University of Belfast. However, in the 1960s, following the recommendations in the Lockwood Report by Sir John Lockwood, Master of Birkbeck College, London, and former Vice-Chancellor of the University of London, the Stormont Parliament made a controversial decision to pass it over in favour of a new university in Coleraine. Instead it was incorporated into the two-campus New University of Ulster in 1969. The next fourteen years saw the college halve in size, while development focused on the main Coleraine campus.

In 1984, the New University merged with the Ulster Polytechnic, and Magee became the early focus of development of a new four-campus university, the University of Ulster. Student and faculty numbers recovered and grew rapidly over the next ten to fifteen years, accompanied by numerous construction projects. Magee grew from just 273 students in 1984 to over 4000 undergraduates in 2012. In 2012, the university continued to lobby the Northern Ireland Executive for an additional 1000 full-time undergraduate places, leading to 6000 students at Magee in 2017. (Note: 6000 students includes 4000 in 2012, 1000 additional without government permission, and 1000 lobbied for from the Northern Ireland Executive.) In October 2014 the University of Ulster was rebranded as Ulster University.

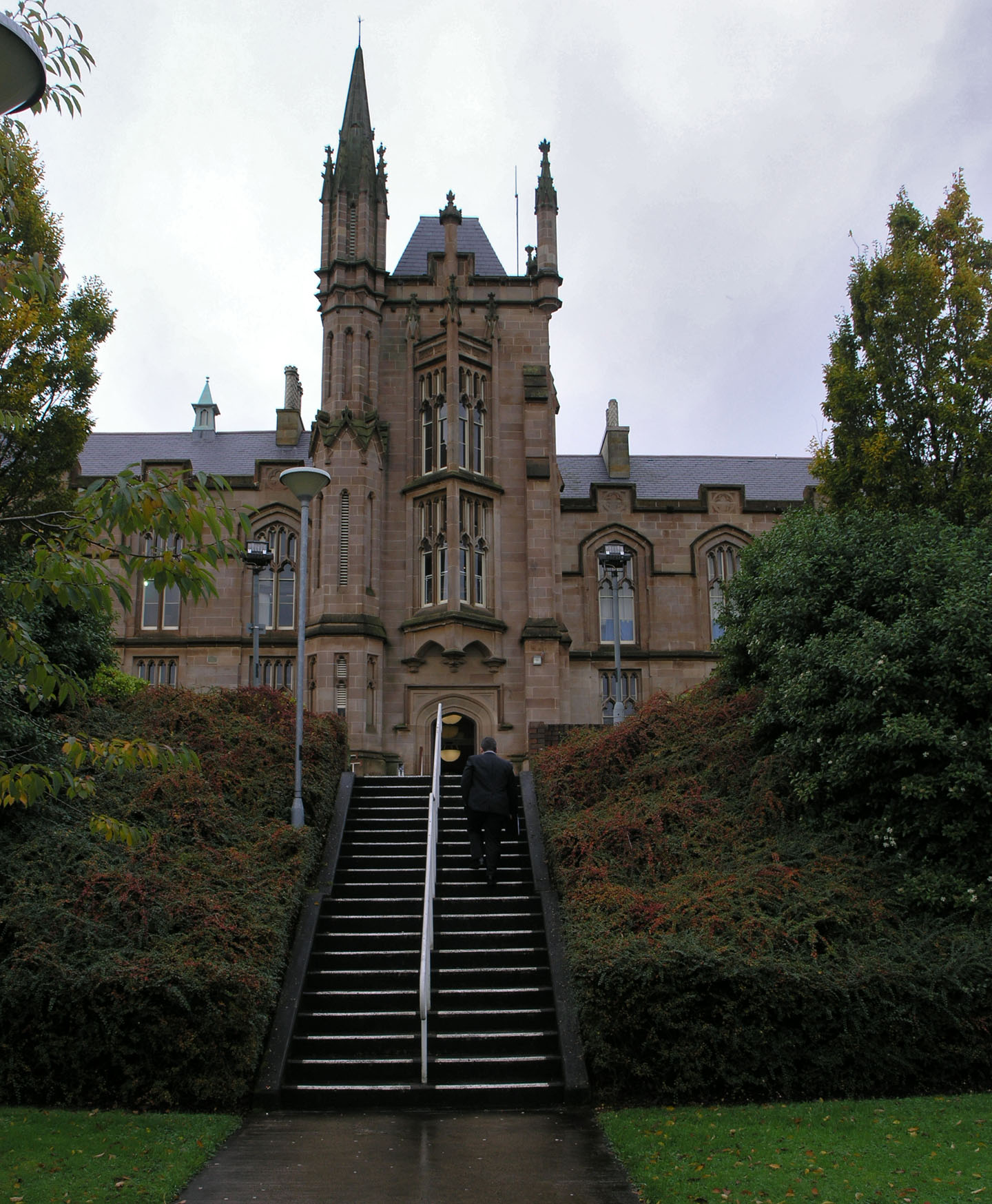
The main building was built with Scottish freestone, and opened in 1865.

=== Timeline ===
- 1845 – Foundation endowment from Martha Magee.
- 1865 – Magee College opened.
- 1880 – Magee College joined the new Royal University of Ireland.
- 1909 – Royal University dissolved. Government funding greatly reduced. Magee College became an autonomous university college, with students completing their degrees at Trinity College, Dublin.
- 1953 – Magee University College received major government grant funding for the first time.
- 1969 – Magee University College merged with the New University of Ulster.
- 1978 – Magee Theological College closed, merging with Assembly's College to form Union Theological College in Belfast.
- 1984 – New University merged with the Ulster Polytechnic, Jordanstown, to form the University of Ulster.
- 2014 – Rebranded name to Ulster University.
- 2021 - Graduate Entry Medical School (GEMS) opens.
- 2023 - Rebranded to Ulster University Derry~Londonderry Campus.

=== Historical notes ===
- Florence Nightingale visited Magee College on 31 May 1867.
- The Magee College bequest is mentioned on the founder's graveyard memorial in Lurgan, County Armagh, Ulster, where her husband was a minister.

== Campus ==
The central feature of the campus is the original 1865 building. This is surrounded by Victorian red brick houses, and several modern buildings in red brick and glass, constructed since the formation of the University of Ulster.

The campus is used for education, but also as a convention centre. For example, Magee hosted the 2006 Tomo-Dachi convention.

Timeline of recent construction

- 1988 – Phase I building
- 1989 – Carrickmore House, extension of main building
- 1990 – Phase II library building
- 1991 – Refurbished main building
- 1992 – Extension of 3/4 College Avenue
- 1993 – Strand Road student residence
- 1995 – Phase III buildings (sports complex and informatics), Duncreggan Road student residences, floodlit all-weather sports ground
- 2018 - New Teaching Block opened adjacent to the library
- 2023 - Plans announced for the new Shared Island teaching block to break ground in 2026 and to be completed in 2028.

== Tip O'Neill Chair ==
Based at Magee, the Tip O'Neill Chair in Peace Studies was established in commemoration of the former Speaker of the United States House of Representatives Thomas "Tip" O'Neill Jr. a well-known supporter of the Northern Ireland Peace Process. The chair was inaugurated by the former President of the United States, Bill Clinton in 1995. Currently funded by The Ireland Funds the chair was held by the Nobel Peace Laureate, John Hume from 2002 to 2009. Under the tenure of Professor Hume Magee hosted a series of guest lectures involving key national and international policy-makers. The Tip O'Neill Chair is currently held by Professor Brandon Hamber.

- Mitchell Reiss, United States Special Envoy to Northern Ireland, 2006
- John Kerry, United States Senator, 2006
- Garret Fitzgerald, former Taoiseach of the Republic of Ireland, 2005
- Hillary Rodham Clinton, United States Senator, 2004
- Kofi Annan, UN Secretary-General, 2004
- Romano Prodi, EU Commission President, 2004
- Pat Cox, MEP and President of the European Parliament, 2004
- Bertie Ahern, then Taoiseach of the Republic of Ireland and President of the European Council, 2003
- Bill Clinton, former President of the United States, 2003
- Michel Rocard, former Prime Minister of France, 2003

== Notable alumni ==
Year of matriculation is given, if known.

- Gregory Campbell, Democratic Unionist MP, 1982
- Mark Durkan, Deputy First Minister of the Northern Ireland Executive, c.1980s
- Dill Macky, founder of The Scots College school in Sydney, 1866
- Brooke Scullion, who repreesnted Ireland in the 2022 Eurovision Song Contest, 2020.

=== Honorary graduates ===
Notable figures have received honorary degrees in graduations hosted by Magee.

- Rt Hon Lord Ashdown (Paddy Ashdown), former Liberal Democrat Leader and former UN High Representative in Bosnia-Herzegovina, 2006
- Amanda Burton, actor, 2002
- Bill Clinton, then President of the United States, 1995
- Hillary Clinton, United States Senator, 2004
- Enya, Irish singer, instrumentalist, and songwriter, 2007
- Gary Lightbody, musician, 2012
- Sir Ian McKellen, actor, 2013
- Stephen Rea, actor, 2004
- Fiona Shaw, actor, 2004

== Gallery ==
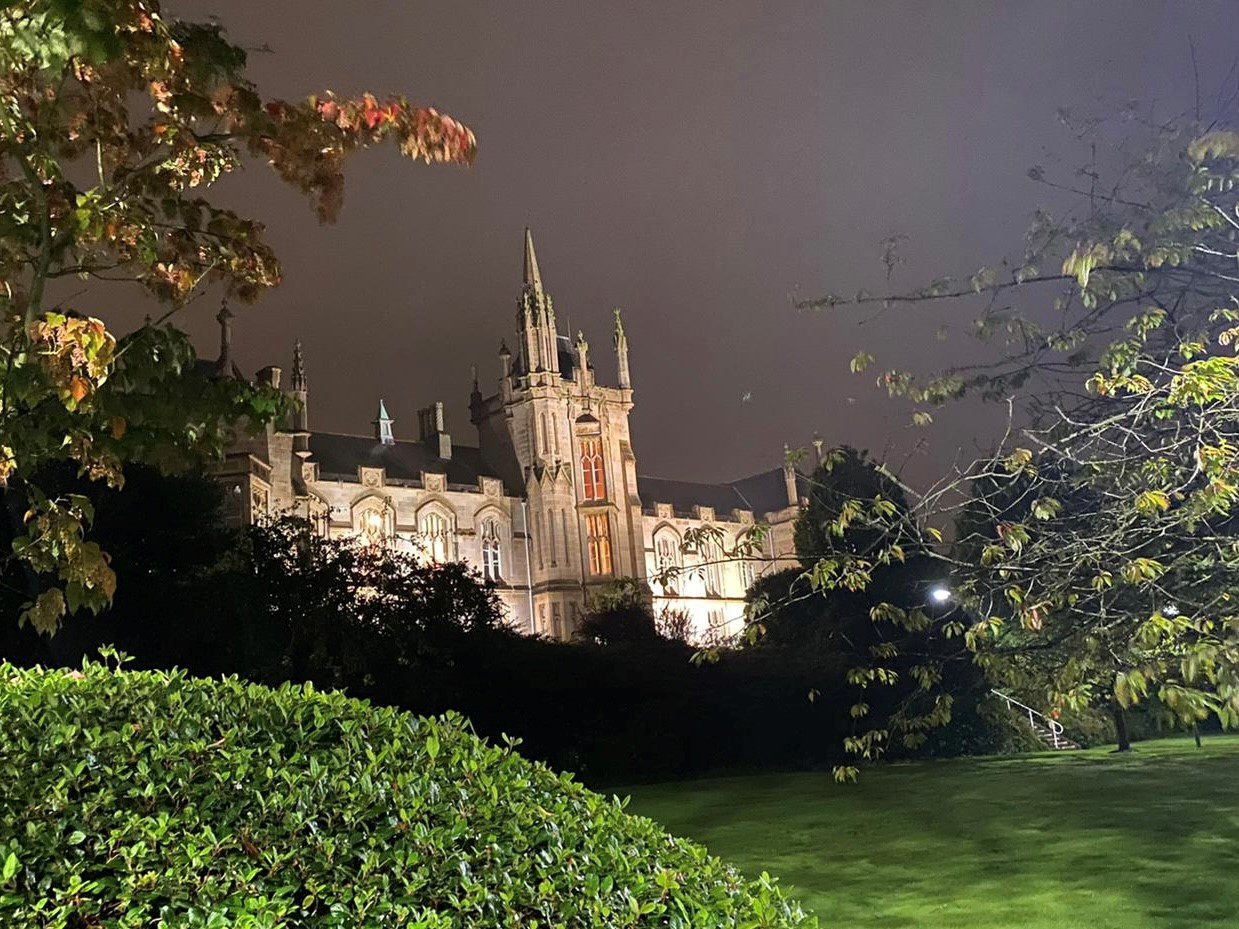
Magee at night

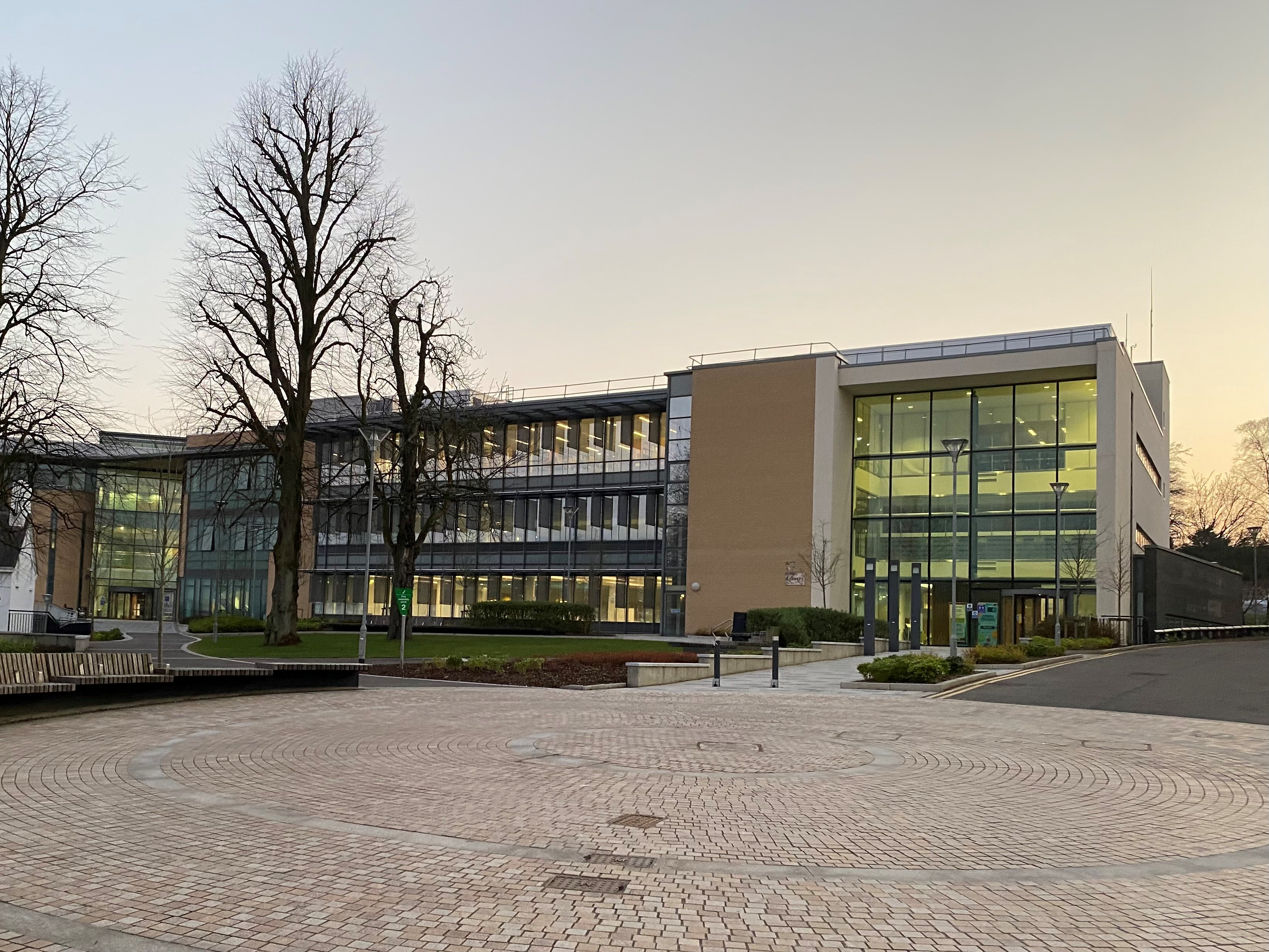
Library building

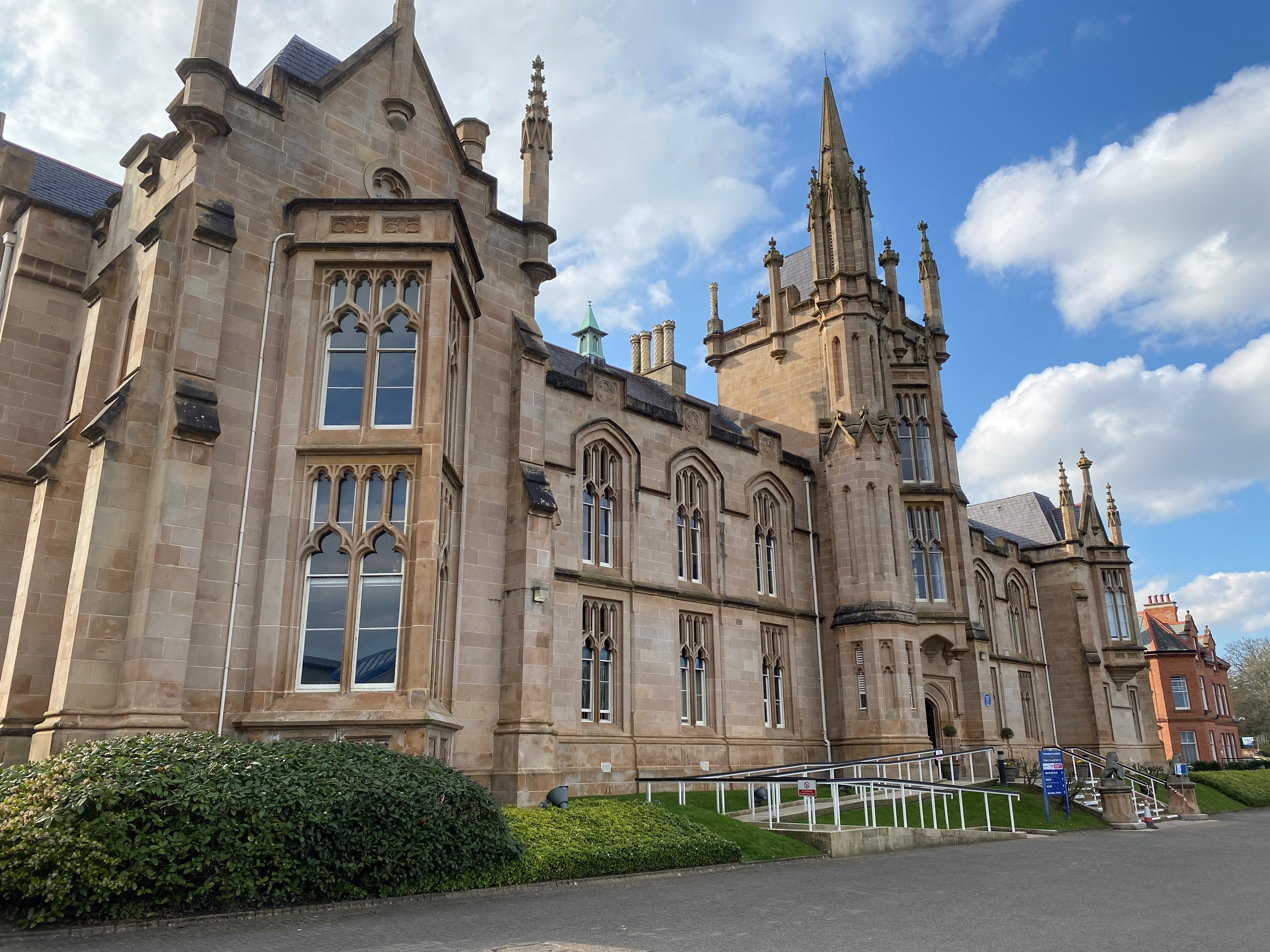
Main building
