= Martha Magee =

Irish philanthropist and co-founder of Magee College

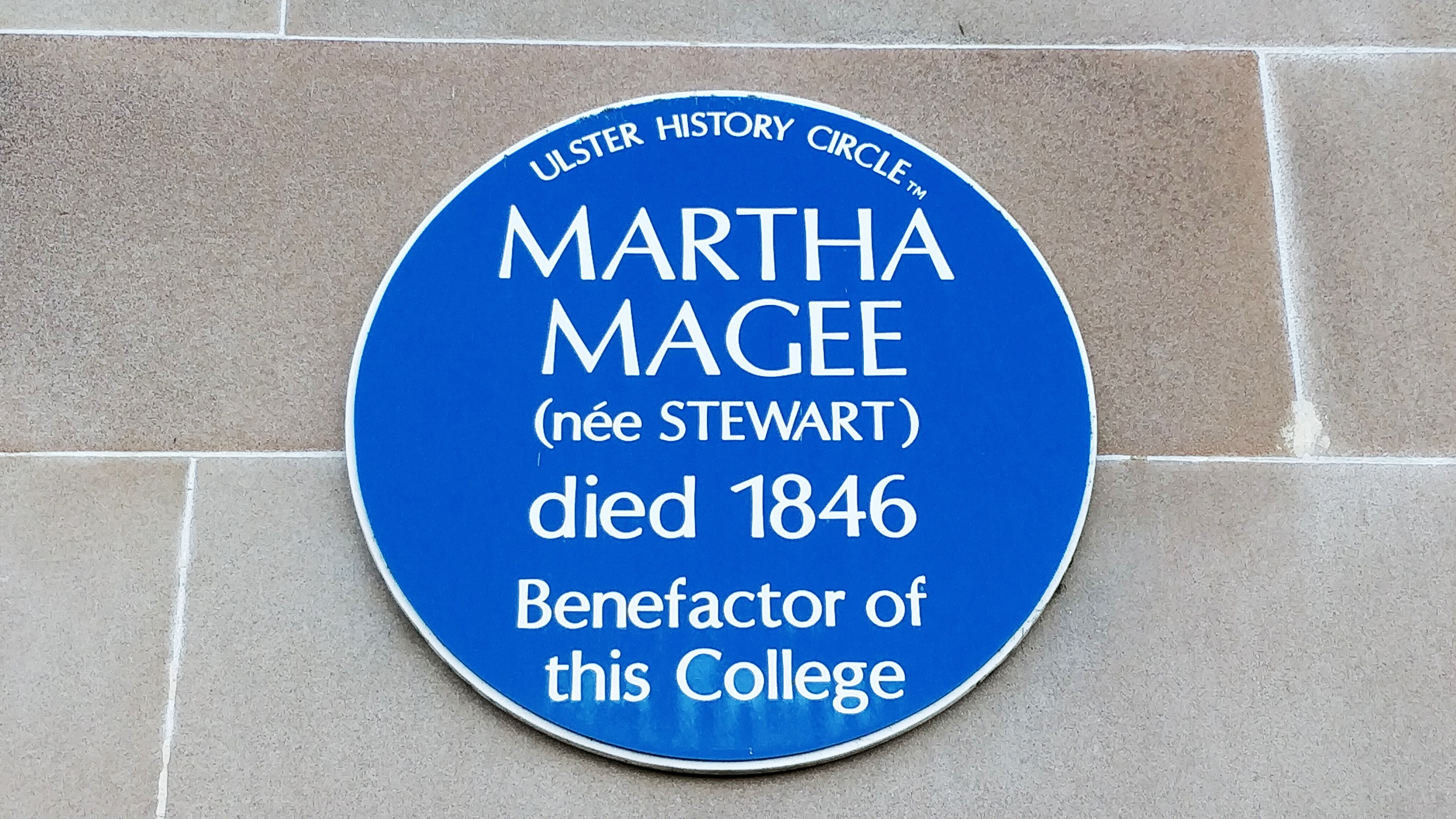
Blue plaque on the wall of the main building on Magee campus

Martha Magee (c. 1755–1846) was a philanthropist and a co-founder and the namesake of Magee College in Northern Ireland.

Martha Maria Magee was born in Lurgan around 1755, the daughter of Robert Stewart. She married Rev. William Magee, a Presbyterian minister, who was ordained in 1780 and died in 1800 leaving her dependent on the Presbyterian Widows' Fund. Magee raised two sons, both of whom entered the military and died as young men. Magee inherited substantial money from her two brothers who were in the military in India. After inheriting the fortune, she made numerous charitable donations throughout her life. In 1845, a year before her death, Magee bequeathed £20,000 in her will to the Presbyterian Church of Ireland to found a college for theology and the arts. Magee died in Dublin on 22 June 1846. Magee College opened in 1865 primarily as a theological college, but accepted students from all denominations to study a variety of subjects.
