= Troll Mill =

2005 novel by Katherine Langrish

- Author: Katherine Langrish
- Language: English
- Series: Troll Trilogy
- Genre: Children's, Fantasy novel
- Publisher: HarperCollins
- Publication date: July 4, 2005
- Publication place: England
- Media type: Print (hardback & paperback)
- ISBN: 0-00-717074-2 (first edition, hardback)
- OCLC: 62264198
- Preceded by: Troll Fell
- Followed by: Troll Blood

Troll Mill is a children's fantasy novel written by British author Katherine Langrish, the second in the Troll Trilogy. It follows the events of Troll Fell, but takes place three years later.

== Synopsis ==
The hero Peer Ulffson now lives with his friend Hilde and her family. One evening on the beach, having just returned from a fishing trip in stormy weather, he is horrified when a neighbour's young wife, Kersten, pushes her newborn child into his arms before throwing herself into the sea. As he carries the baby home through the windy night, he sees the old deserted mill mysteriously working away ‘all by itself’.

Rumours abound in the village that Kersten was a seal woman, and that her husband Bjørn the fisherman, Peer's friend and mentor, is now cursed, doomed to die at sea. As he struggles to understand these mysteries and protect the vulnerable ‘seal-baby’ from the predatory water spirit Granny Greenteeth, Peer must also learn to cope with his feelings for Hilde, and try to carve out a future for himself.

As in the first book of the trilogy, Troll Fell, Langrish uses a variety of folklore motifs such as the Orkney legends of seal people or selkies to create an unusual and believable fantasy.
