= RNLB Julia Park Barry of Glasgow =

History

British Civil Ensign
- Operator: Royal National Lifeboat Institution
- In service: 1939–1969
- Home port: Peterhead, Scotland, United Kingdom
- Official Number: ON 819

General characteristics
- Class & type: Watson-class lifeboat
- Displacement: 20.5 tons
- Length: 46 ft (14 m)
- Beam: 13 ft (4.0 m)
- Height: 22 ft (6.7 m)
- Propulsion: Twin diesel engines
- Speed: 8.5 knots (15.7 km/h)

RNLB Julia Park Barry of Glasgow (ON 819) is a former RNLI Watson-class lifeboat that was in active service in Peterhead, Scotland from 15 June 1939 to 14 January 1969.

The vessel's sea trials took place on the Holy Loch before making her way from the Clyde through the Forth and Clyde Canal to her new home in Peterhead. At the time, the 46' (14m) long by 12' 9" (3.9m) Julia Park Barry of Glasgow was one of the most modern and powerful of the many RNLI Lifeboats that had been built by Messr's Alexander Robertson and Son's, one of the foremost wooden boat-builders on Scotland's River Clyde. The vessel had 40 h.p. diesel engines which drove twin screws giving the Julia Park Barry a speed of 9 knots and had the capacity to travel 215 miles at full speed. The engine itself was water-tight meaning even if the engine room was flooded, it would continue to run.

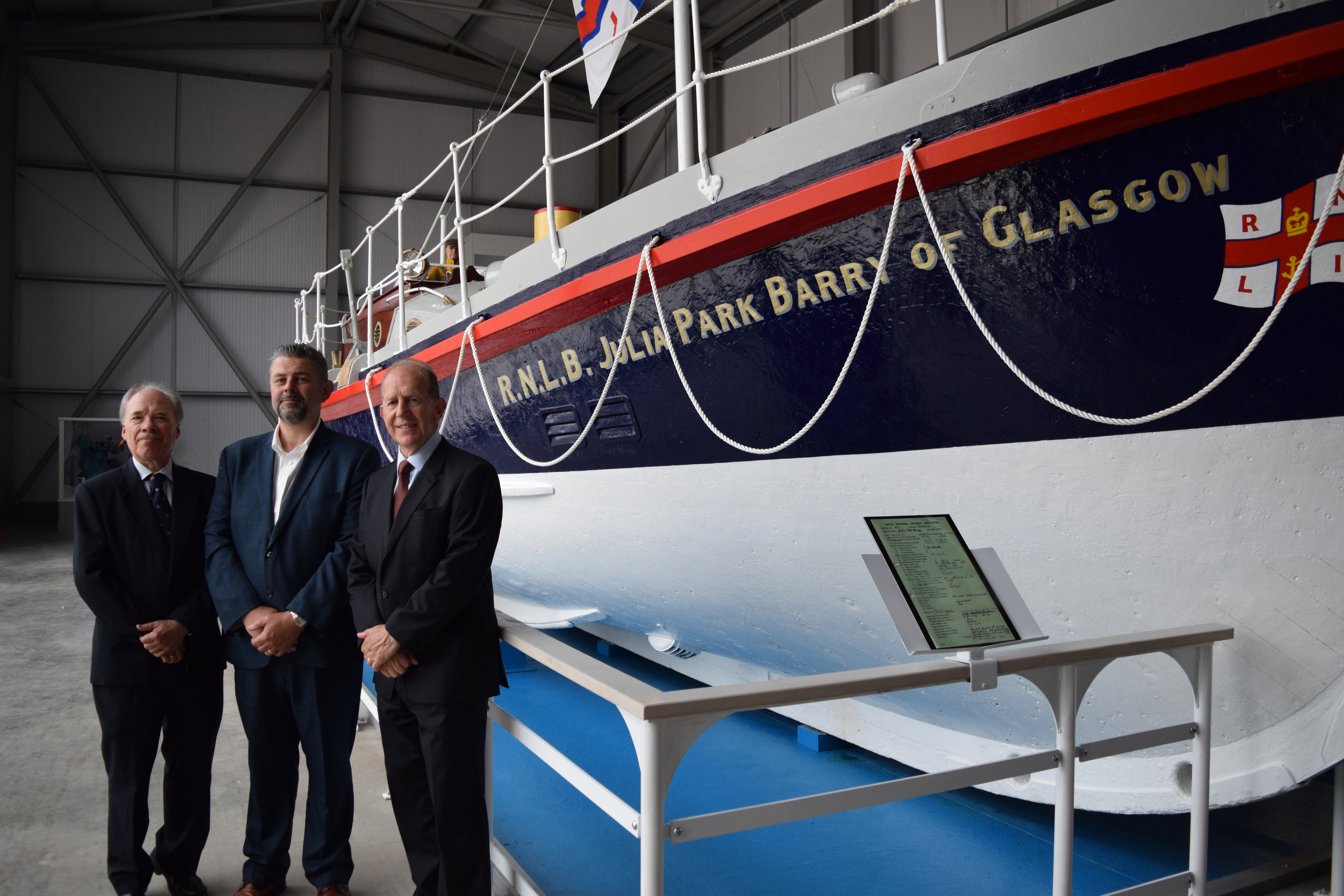
Julia Park Barry of Glasgow at the Opening Ceremony in Peterhead June 2019

The vessel was designed to hold a crew of eight but could in addition carry a further 95 persons even in the roughest of storms. This buoyancy was aided by the nine watertight compartments which also provided further strength to the vessel design. It was also installed with electric lighting and searchlight and was equipped with a line-throwing gun.

During its near 30 years of service, RNLB Julia Park Barry of Glasgow saved 496 lives. Notably, it facilitated the rescue of 106 lives in March 1942 over a 75-hour period, which earned Coxswain John B McLean the RNLI Gold Medal, the first to be awarded in Scotland in 104 years.

The 46 feet (14 m) vessel, most recently berthed in Northern Ireland after being used as a leisure craft, was then purchased by Professor Sir Lewis Ritchie OBE FRSE (General Practitioner Peterhead 1980-2017) with a view to returning it as an exhibition piece to the town. After being stored by Peterhead Port Authority for a few years, it was then relocated to Admiralty Gateway, site of Peterhead Prison Museum in May 2015. where it was fully restored during 2018

It became centrepiece of the Julia Park Barry Building, a museum retelling the story of the vessel, and history of lifeboats in Peterhead. The museum was officially opened by Professor Sir Lewis Ritchie on 28 June 2019.
