= Lewis Ritchie =

Scottish medical academic (born 1952)

- Born: Lewis Duthie Ritchie; 26 June 1952 (age 74); Fraserburgh, Aberdeenshire, Scotland
- Education: University of Aberdeen; University of Edinburgh
- Medical career
- Profession: Medical doctor
- Field: General Practitioner

Sir Lewis Duthie Ritchie (born 26 June 1952) is a Scottish medical doctor who worked as a general practitioner (GP) and medical researcher. He is the James Mackenzie Professor of General Practice at the University of Aberdeen and holds honorary professorships at the University of Edinburgh and the University of the Highlands and Islands.

== Early life and education ==
Ritchie was born in Fraserburgh to Sheila Gladys Noble and Lewis Duthie Ritchie. He attended Fraserburgh Academy before going on to study chemistry and medicine at the University of Aberdeen, graduating with BSc and MB ChB (with commendation) in 1978. He received his MD from the university in 1993. In 1982, he graduated from the University of Edinburgh with an MSc in community medicine.

== Career ==
Ritchie authored the book Computers in Primary Care: Practicalities and Prospects which was published in 1984.

He was appointed the James Mackenzie Professor of General Practice at the University of Aberdeen in 1992 and continues to serve in that capacity.

In 2012, he was appointed director of Public Health in NHS Grampian. In January 2015, the Scottish Government announced him as the chair of a review into out-of-hours services. Ritchie said that to inform the review he had talked to doctors, patients, ambulance staff and NHS 24 workers. Ten months later, his report made 28 recommendations.

Ritchie stepped down from his role as senior general practice partner at Peterhead Health Centre in 2012, where he worked for 37 years. To mark the occasion he bought the Julia Park Barry, a lifeboat that had been used to save hundreds of people before being taken out of service in 1969. He gifted it to the community. In 2019 it went on display, following restoration.

In 2014, he was appointed chair of Council of the Queen's Nursing Institute Scotland (QNIS). The following year he was appointed as an honorary professor in the University of Edinburgh College of Medicine and Veterinary Medicine.

In 2017, he was named as chair of a group of independent advisers, charged with looking at NHS Tayside's financial difficulties and to report to Scottish Government within a three month period.

In January 2018, he was named as the chair of a review of urgent care services in Skye, Lochalsh and Wester Ross. Interim findings were published a few months later.

In February 2026, he was announced as a co-chair of an oversight group intended to monitor safety and rebuild public confidence after a series of difficulties that had affected hospitals.

== Awards and honours ==
Ritchie gave the Royal College of General Practitioners James Mackenzie Lecture in 2010. He was made OBE in the 2001 Queen's Birthday Honours. He was elected as a fellow of the Royal Society of Edinburgh in 2016. He was awarded Associate Fellowship of QNIS in 2021 in recognition of his service to them in chairing their council. Ritchie's professional peer awards include: the John Perry Prize of the British Computer Society (1991); the James Mackenzie Lecture of the Royal College of General Practitioners (2010), the DARE Lecture of the Faculty of Public Health (2014) and the Mary Sommerville Medal of the Royal Society of Edinburgh (2023). He was awarded the Eric Elder Medal of the Royal New Zealand College of General Practitioners in 2007.

In the 2011 New Year Honours he was made Knight Bachelor for services to the NHS in Scotland. He was invested on 5 July 2011.
