= Friar Rush =

Medieval Low German legend

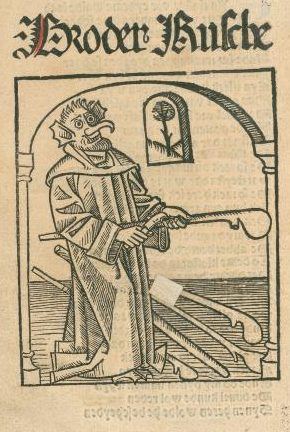
Broder Rusche ―Low German. Broder Rusche, Stendal: Joachim Westphal c. 1488. Frontispiece woodcut.

Friar Rush (Broder Rusche, Bruder Rausch, Broder Ruus) is the title of a medieval Low German legend, surviving in a 1488 edition in verse form. During the 16th and 17th centuries, numerous High German, Scandinavian (Danish and Swedish), Dutch and English translations and adaptations in Volksbuch or chap book form were printed. The first High German edition dates to 1515, printed in Strassburg.

The story along with those of Till Eulenspiegel, Faust and Marcolf was among the most successful popular literature in 16th-century Germany. The various adaptations vary in their style and focus, some intending to set a moral example or criticize excesses in monastic life, others simply intending to amuse the reader.

== Nomenclature ==
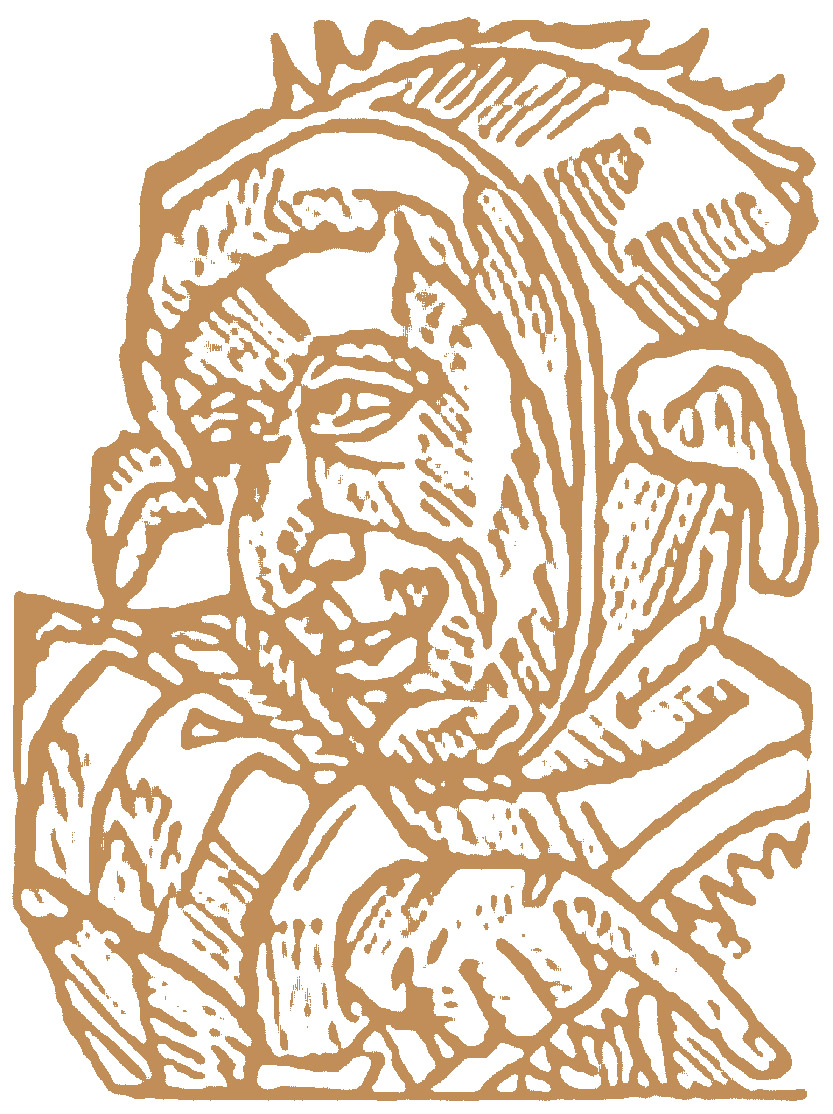
Broder Russ (Danish) ―Broder Russes Historie, Copenhagen: Hans Vingaard, 1555. Frontispiece woodcut

Bruder Rausch (Broder Ruus and variants, in the English version Frier Rush). Early Modern German Rusche, Rausch is the term for a loud swooshing noise.

== Narrative ==
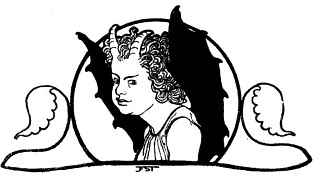
Bruder Rausch revealing devil form ―Franz Staffen (illustr.) in Hertz (1922)[1882] Bruder Rausch: ein Klostermärchen, 10te Abent.

In the narrative, the devil infiltrates a monastery full of young monks, posing as one Bruder Rausch and getting hired as a kitchen servant. Acting as a prankster, Friar Rausch causes various episodes of commotion among the monks. Rausch is assigned the task of procuring women for the abbot and the other monks every night. On one occasion, he is about to be chastised by the cook for being delayed. Rush throws the cook into a boiling cauldron and takes his place, working to the satisfaction of the monks for seven years, but constantly causing strife among them. Rausch's demonic identity is finally discovered by the abbot, who expels him from the monastery by means of the sacred mass. In the High German version, Rush then travels to England and possesses the king's daughter. He is again exorcized after the abbot is called in from Saxony for the purpose, who banishes the demon inside a hill near the monastery.

== Analysis ==
An analysis by Shakespearean scholar George Lyman Kittredge (1900) discusses various possibilities, perhaps inconclusively. He concedes that the tale may well have originated in Low German, But he has also seized on the possibility that the Icelandic Frá þvî er púkinn gjörðiz ábóti may represent an earlier simplistic version of Friar Rush that has survived, and this combined with elements of the German house-kobold tale about the "Hödeken" resulted in the familiar version. The episode of Friar Rush boiling the cook is paralleled in the story of another kobold, the Chimmeke of Loitz in Pomerania. And the service of Rush guarding a man's wife, which only occurs in the English version, is paralleled in the story of the Hödeken.

Kittredge criticized the then-common notion the helpful-and-satanic Friar Rush wasn't the only one adapted into English, but it had also forked into a good "friar", akin to Robin Goodfellow. Both were apparently helpful household spirits that accepted offerings of cream, according to a misreading of Samuel Harsnett (1603) A Declaration of Egregious Popish Impostures by past commentators. In fact, Kittredge argues, Harsnett was not speaking of any folkloric supernatural "friar" lurking in the kitchen, but polemically blaming actual flesh-and-blood clergymen (led inside homes at appointed hours) and dairy-maids as being the real-life culprits who made the cream offerings to home-sprites disappear. (Note: Harsnett's target in the historical backdrop were the Jesuits who "spiritually guided" collaborators into enacting fake demonic possession, so they could pretend to exorcise them and convert people to their sect.)

Kittredge however credited Reginald Scott's Discoverie of Witchcraft (1584) for recognizing a parallel between Rush and the kobold Hödeken (spelt Hudgin or Hutgin). (Note: Reginald Scott also commented that since Hudgin was named from wearing a cap or hood, "it was [the same as] Robin Hood". Note that Trithemius's chronicle had date to circa year 1132 the incident of the "spiritus Hütgin", as already stated in the foregoing note, would antedate legends about Robin Hood supposedly contemporary with King John of England (1166–1216).)

== Friar Rush in other works ==
Friar Rush appears in Elizabethan playwright Thomas Dekker's If This Be Not a Good Play the Devill is in It.

Nineteenth-century German writer Wilhelm Hertz published a novel Bruder Rausch in 1882 based on the story.

== Publication history ==
- 1488, Joachim Westfal, Stendal, Broder Rusche (Low German)
- 1515, Strasbourg (High German)
- 1519, Hans Dorn, Braunschweig (Low German)
- ca. 1520, Servais Kruffter, Cologne, Staatsbibliothek Berlin Yg 6037; facsimile edition by Priebsch (1919).
- 1555, Hans Vingaard, Copenhagen, Broder Ruuses Historie, Royal Library LN 937 8° (Danish)
- 1596 (Dutch)
- 1600, Laurentz Benedicht, Copenhagen, Royal Library LN 938 8° (Danish), directly derived from the Danish text of 1555.
- 1620, London, The Historie of Frier Rush: how he came to a house of Religion to seeke service, and being entertained by the Priour was first made under Cooke. Being full of pleasant mirth and delight for young people. (English); 1810 reprint
- 1645, Broder Ruus/ Thet aer/ Brodher Ruuses Historia Eller Chronica. Huruledes han vthi ett Cloester hafwer tient siw åhr foer en Kock/ och hwad han ther bedrifwit hafwer (Swedish)
- 1655, Stockholm, Broder Ruus/ Thet aer/ Brodher Ruuses | Historia | Eller | Chronica. Huruledes han vthi ett Cloe-ster hafwer tient siw åhr foer en | Kock/ och hwad han ther bedrif-wit hafwer: Foermerat medh een annan liten Hi-storia/ Lustigh at laesa, Royal Library F1700 1865.
- 1696, Copenhagen, Historie Om Broder Rus Hvorledis hand hafver tient for Kock oc Munck udi et Kloster oc hvad hand hafver bedrevet der udi, Royal Library, Hielmstierneske Samling 1862 8° (Danish). Several 18th- to 19th-century prints were based on this text.

== See also ==
- Lubber fiend
- Ship of Fools (satire)

== Bibliography ==
- Anz, Heinrich. Broder Rusche. In: Jahrbuch des Vereins für niederdeutsche Sprachforschung 24 (1899), 76–112.
- Anz, Heinrich. Die Dichtung vom Bruder Rausch. Euphorion. Zeitschrift für Litteraturgeschichte 4 (1897), 756–772.
- Bruun, Christian. Broder Russes Historie. Kjøbenhavn: Thieles Bogtrykkeri 1868.
- Frandsen, Søren. Historien om Broder Rus. In: Frandsen, Søren et al. Bogen om Esrum Kloster. Helsingør: Frederiksborg Amt 1997, 169–187.
- Frosell, Hampton. Hvem var Broder Rus? Meddelelser fra Rigsbibliotekaren. 35. årgang nr. 3 (1984), 3–12.
- Herford, Charles Harold (1966) Studies in the Literary Relations of England and Germany in the Sixteenth Century, chapter 5.iv, pp. 193–322), ISBN 0-7146-2062-9.
- Kittredge, George Lyman (1900). "The Friar's Lantern and Friar Rush". Publications of the Modern Language Association. 15: 415–441.
- Priebsch, Robert. Die Grundfabel und Entwicklungsgeschichte der Dichtung vom Bruder Rausch. Prager Deutsche Studien 8 (1908), 423–434.
- Wolf, Ferdinand and Stephan Endlicher. Von Bruoder Rauschen. In: Scheible, Johann. Das Kloster vol. 11. Stuttgart: J. Scheible 1849, 1070–1118.
