= Gabriele Annan =

German-born British author and literary and film critic

The Right Honourable The Lady Annan
- Born: Gabriele Ullstein; 25 November 1921; Berlin, Germany
- Died: 12 November 2013 (aged 91); Eaton Square, London, England
- Education: Newnham College, Cambridge
- Occupations: Author, and literary and film critic
- Spouse: Noel Annan, Baron Annan

Gabriele Annan, Baroness Annan (née Ullstein, 25 November 1921 – 12 November 2013), was a German-born British author and literary and film critic, and the wife of the military intelligence officer, author, and academic Noel Annan, Baron Annan.

== Early life ==
She was born Gabriele Ullstein, on 25 November 1921 in Berlin, the daughter of Louis-Ferdinand Ullstein (1863–1933), one of five Jewish brothers who owned a large newspaper, magazine, and book publishing business, and his wife Martha Ullstein, née Joel (1889–1974). She was the only child from her father's second marriage, and until the age of 11, lived in a mansion in the Grunewald, now the British Ambassador's Berlin residence.

She was educated at a progressive boarding school in England, and earned a degree in modern languages from Newnham College, Cambridge.

== Career ==
After the war, she was a member of the Cambridge Ladies ski team, shared a London flat with Mary Blewitt, and worked in advertising, coming up with the slogan, "All the Boy Scouts at their Jamborees/eat lashings of Batchelors wonderful peas."

Annan wrote literary criticism for The Spectator and The New York Review of Books. She was an early advocate for the work of Kazuo Ishiguro, Ian McEwan and Alan Hollinghurst.

She was a film critic for The Spectator and the Sunday Telegraph, until in 1987, they asked her for a review of the third Care Bears movie, The Care Bears Adventure in Wonderland.

== Personal life ==
She met her future husband, the British military intelligence officer, author, and academic Noel Annan, Baron Annan (1916–2000), when he returned to King's College, Cambridge, following the Second World War. They married on 30 June 1950, and had two daughters, Lucy, born in 1952, and Juliet, born in 1955.

== Later life ==
She died on 12 November 2013, of heart failure, at her flat in Eaton Square, London, and was survived by her two daughters.
