= George Bruce (poet) =

Scottish poet and radio journalist (1909–2002)

George Bruce OBE (10 March 1909 – 25 July 2002) was a Scottish poet and radio journalist.

He was educated at Fraserburgh Academy and Aberdeen University and later taught at the High School of Dundee, commuting across the Tay from Wormit in Fife.

He was a BBC producer at Aberdeen (1946-1956) and Edinburgh (1956-1970). He co-produced the radio programmes Scottish Art and Letters and Arts Review. Later he was fellow in creative writing at Glasgow University (1971–73) and visiting professor in US and Australia. In 1975-1976 he was the executive editor of The Scottish Review.

In 1984 he was awarded OBE. His book Pursuit won the Saltire Society award (1999) for Scottish Book of the Year. His portrait (oil on panel, by Colin Dunbar, 1969) is in the collection of the Scottish National Portrait Gallery.

== Books ==
- 1944: Sea Talk
- 1967: Landscapes and Figures
- 1967: Perspectives
- 1970: Collected Poems
- 1985: The red sky: poems
- 1986: A Scottish Postbag, co-edited with Paul Scott, an anthology of Scottish letters from the 13th century to the present
- 1999: Pursuit
- 2001: Woman of the North Sea, a book of art, co-produced with artist John Bellany
- 2007: The Singing of the Foxes
- To Foster and Enrich a history of the Saltire Society.

== Articles ==
- "The World of Robin Jenkins", in Saltire Review, Vol. 6, No. 20, Spring 1960, The Saltire Society, Edinburgh, pp. 73 - 77
- "The Scottish Tradition", a review of The Scottish Tradition in Literature by Kurt Wittig, in Reid, Alexander (ed.), Saltire Review, Vol. 5, No. 16, Autumn 1958, The Saltire Society, pp. 49 - 51
- "F.G. Scott 1880 - 1958", in Cencrastus No. 4, Winter 1980-81, pp. 25 & 26, ISSN 0264-0856
