= Peter Noble (academic) =

British academic

Sir Peter Noble
- Born: 17 October 1899
- Died: 12 May 1987 (aged 87)
- Spouse: Mary Stephen
- Children: 2 sons, 1 daughter

Academic background
- Education: Fraserburgh Academy
- Alma mater: University of Aberdeen; St John's College, Cambridge

Academic work
- Institutions: University of Liverpool; University of Leeds; University of Aberdeen; King's College London

Sir Peter Scott Noble (17 October 1899 – 12 May 1987) was a British academic who was principal of King's College London from 1952 to 1968 and later vice-chancellor of the University of London from 1961 to 1964.

== Education ==
Noble was educated at Fraserburgh Academy, Scotland, followed by the University of Aberdeen and then St John's College, Cambridge, where he graduated with a double first in classics and Oriental languages. He was made a fellow of St John's College in 1928.

== Career ==
Noble was a lecturer in Latin at Liverpool University from 1926 to 1930. He then became professor of Latin language and literature at the University of Leeds from 1930 to 1938 and then Regius Professor of Humanity at the University of Aberdeen from 1938 to 1952. He served as principal of King's College London from 1952 to 1968. He was joint editor of Kharosthi Inscriptions.

== Personal life ==
In 1928 he married Mary Stephen (died 1983) and they had two sons and one daughter. He was knighted on 1 January 1967.

== See also ==
- List of Vice-Chancellors of the University of London

Academic offices
Preceded by Sir William Reginald Halliday	Principal of King's College London; 1952–1968	Succeeded by General Sir John Hackett
Preceded by Sir Charles Felix Harris	Vice-Chancellor of the University of London; 1961–64	Succeeded by Sir Thomas Percival Creed
