= Marian Busk =

British botanist (1861-1941)

Lady Marian (née Balfour) Busk (1861 – 31 March 1941) was a British botanist and translator. She was known for her translation of Das Pflanzenleben der Donauländer by Anton Kerner von Marilaun.

Busk was the daughter of silk merchant Lewis Balfour. After private study in botany and chemistry she earned in 1883 one of the first bachelor's degrees given to women by Queen's College, London. In 1905 she became one of the earliest female fellows of the Linnean Society of London, which began admitting female fellows in 1904.

Beyond botany, her interests also included women's suffrage. She married legal scholar Edward Henry Busk in 1880; he was knighted in 1901.

== Works ==
- Kerner von Marilaun, Anton (1895–1896). The natural history of plants, their forms, growth, reproduction, and distribution. Translated by Busk, Lady Marian (Balfour); Macdonald, Mary Frances; Oliver, Francis Wall. New York: H. Holt and Company. doi:10.5962/bhl.title.54631.
