= Charles Felix Harris =

Vice-Chancellor University of London

Sir Charles Felix Harris FRCP FRCS (30 March 1900 in New York – 10 March 1974) was a medical doctor who was Vice Chancellor of London University from 1958 to 1961.

== Early years ==
He was born in New York and spent his early life there and in Australia where is father was involved in shipping. He came to England in 1914 and attended Epsom College. He then attended St Bartholomew's Hospital Medical school (Barts) qualifying as a doctor in 1923. He became MD and MRCP in 1925 working at Barts. In 1900, Barts Medical School became a constituent college of the University of London.

== Career ==
In 1929 he became the first doctor in England to be in charge of a separate children’s department at Barts. He remained at Barts during the Second World War and in 1945 became Dean of the medical school. He had close connections with the University of London and in 1950 became a member of its Senate, the governing body covering the various colleges, medical schools and other institutions in 1950, and of its Court in 1951. He was Dean of the Medical Faculty from 1952 to 1956, Vice-Chancellor from 1958 to 1961 and Chairman of the Convocation.

Sir Charles helped in the establishment of the Institute of Basic Medical Sciences at the Royal College of Surgeons. He served as President of the British Paediatric Association in 1962 and as a Fellow of the Royal College of Physicians in 1932.

== The Sir Charles Harris Prize ==
Each year the University of London awards in his honour the Sir Charles Harris Prize for the best results achieved in the final examinations by an external student of English. Previous winners of the award include the British author, Katherine Langrish.

== Personal details ==
In 1929 he married Edith Nadejda Goldsmith, known as Nadia. He was knighted in 1968, and his services to the University of London were recognized by the award of an honorary LL.D.

== See also ==
- List of Vice-Chancellors of the University of London

Academic offices
Preceded by Sir John Francis Lockwood	Vice-Chancellor of the University of London; 1958–1961	Succeeded by Peter Scott Noble
