= John O'Reilly (engineer) =

Former vice-chancellor of Cranfield University

Sir John (James) O'Reilly DSc PhD CEng FREng, FRAes FLSW (born 1 December 1946) was Vice-Chancellor of Cranfield University from 2006 to 2013. He is the son of Patrick William and Dorothy Ann O'Reilly. He has one son and one daughter.

== Career ==
He was a student apprentice at the Royal Radar Establishment in Malvern from 1963 to 1969. He later attended Brunel University gaining a BTech degree in 1969 and a DSc in 1991. He was a Lecturer and later Senior Lecturer at the University of Essex 1972–85 and Professor of Electronic Engineering from 1985 to 1994. He was Head of the School of Electronic Engineering and Computer Systems at the University college of North Wales, later the University of North Wales, Bangor 1985–93 where he gained a PhD in 1982. He was Principal Research Fellow at British Telecom Labs from 1993 to 1994. He was Professor of Telecommunications from 1994 to 2001 and head of the Department of Electronic and Electrical Engineering, 1997–2001 at University College London. He then became Chief Executive of EPSRC.

He later became Vice-Chancellor of Cranfield University from 2006 to 2013. He was knighted in 2007.

He was elected a Fellow of the Learned Society of Wales in 2011.

He left Cranfield and became Director General, Knowledge and Innovation, BIS, from 2013 – 2015.

Since 2015, he is Chairman of NICC Ltd., - a company which develops interoperability standards for public communications networks and services in the UK.

In 2019, he named an Honorary Citizen of Singapore for contributions to Singapore in engineering research and development.

== Publications ==
Telecommunication Principles, 1984 Optimisation Methods in Electronics and Communications, 1984 (edited with K. W. Cattermole) Problems of Randomness in Communication Engineering, 1984 Has also contributed numerous conference papers.

Academic offices
Preceded by Frank Robinson Hartley	Sir John O'Reilly; Vice Chancellor; Cranfield University; 2006-2013	Succeeded by Sir Peter Gregson
