= Troll Blood =

2004 novel by Katherine Langrish

- Author: Katherine Langrish
- Language: English
- Series: Troll Trilogy
- Genre: Children's, Fantasy novel
- Published: 5 Feb 2007 (HarperCollins)
- Publication place: United Kingdom
- Media type: Print (hardback & paperback)
- Pages: 400pp
- ISBN: 0-00-721486-3 (first edition, hardback)
- OCLC: 144767008
- Preceded by: Troll Mill

Troll Blood is a children's fantasy novel, the third volume of the Troll Trilogy written by Katherine Langrish. It follows the events of Troll Fell and Troll Mill.

== Synopsis ==
In contrast to the first two books in the trilogy, Troll Blood opens far from Viking Scandinavia, across the ocean in Vinland, where a young Native American boy, Kwimu, and his father Senumkwe, see two Viking ships in the bay and witness the massacre of one crew by the other. As the victors sail away, leaving the other longship scuttled and burning, Kwimu and his father find the sole survivor, a little boy called Ottar, whom they adopt.

Back in Norway, Peer's friend, Hilde, is impatient with life and longing for adventure, so when a Viking ship arrives at their village looking for crew, she and Peer set sail. They soon find plenty to occupy them. The sailors believe the ship is haunted by the ghost of a murdered man. The captain's handsome young son Harald Silkenhair is a dangerous psychopath who becomes Peer's deadly enemy. And the voyage is taking them far away to Vinland, where the dark forests are full of mysterious creatures, and where danger and treachery awaits.

== Background ==
Both the US and the UK editions of Troll Blood carry an explanatory note on the historical interaction of Vikings and Native American people in the 10th century. The US edition of Troll Blood also includes a bibliography listing primary and secondary sources for the Native American culture references in the book, most of which were based on the Mi’kmaq of New Brunswick and Nova Scotia.{{
