= Fraserburgh Academy =

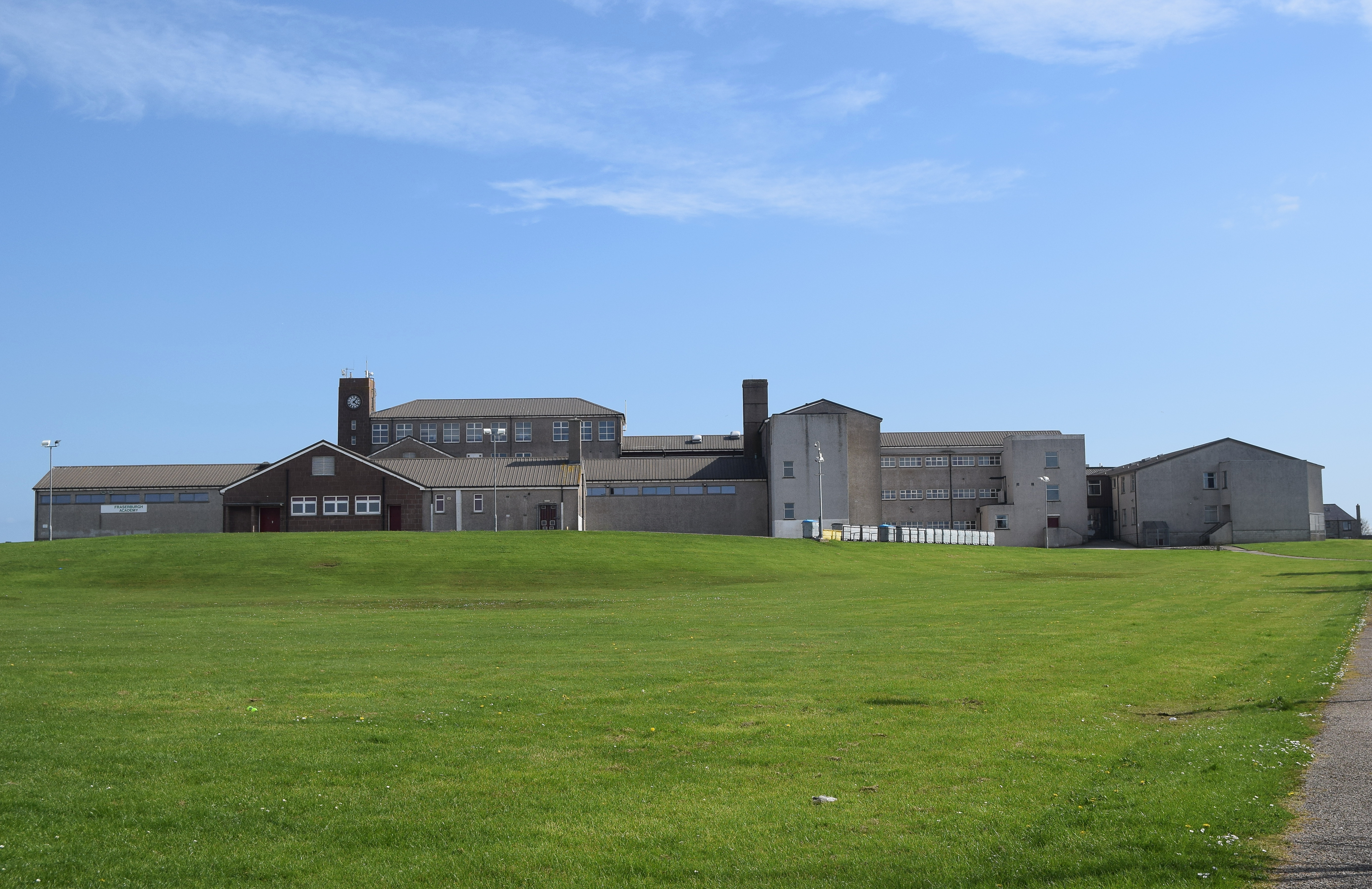
- The exterior of the school in May 2018.

Location
- Dennyduff Road; Fraserburgh, Aberdeenshire, AB43 9NA; Scotland; 57.6878°N 2.0159°W

Information
- Type: Secondary school
- Established: 1909
- Local authority: Aberdeenshire Council
- Rector: Edward Walton
- Gender: Co-educational
- Age: 11 to 18
- Enrollment: 1260 (2024)
- Houses: Corbie (Orange), Dundarg (Blue), Faithlie (Red), Kinnaird (Yellow), Mormond (Green), Philorth (Purple)
- School years: S1-S6
- Website: Fraserburgh Academy

Fraserburgh Academy is a secondary school in Fraserburgh, Aberdeenshire. It is one of seventeen schools run by Aberdeenshire Council. The current school building was opened in 1962 by Princess Margaret.

== History ==
Fraserburgh Academy was originally established in 1870, at a site on Mid Street, after local clothier James Park saw a gap in the town's education. The building cost £2500 at the time, and the first headmaster was William McGill. By 1903, Robert Lees was rector of the academy. It was during this time that the school building was no longer fit for purpose, due to the rising school roll. A new school building was built on Finlayson Street at a cost of £7500 and would provide accommodation for 400 pupils and was opened on 8 June 1909 by Dr Dunn H.M Chief inspector of Schools. 300-400 children followed a pipe band from the Mid Street Academy to the new school. By the 1950s the Academy was now full and a replacement was needed. Another building, the current Academy, was built on Dennyduff Road, to accommodate 1500 pupils and was officially opened on 20 September 1962 by Princess Margaret accompanied by Lord Snowdon.

From 2019 to November 2021, a £2 million project was undertaken that saw facilities upgraded and the construction of a new drama studio. The project has allowed the entire school to be contained within a single building.

In July 2025, headteacher Irene Sharp retired, and former drama teacher, Edward Walton became the head teacher

== Notable former pupils ==
- James Cowie (1886–1956), painter and teacher
- Sir Peter Scott Noble (1899–1987), academic
- George Bruce (1909–2002), poet
- Bill Gibb (1943–1988), fashion designer
- Sir Lewis Duthie Ritchie (1953–), CITP, general practitioner and professor
- Felicity Buchan (1970–), MP for Kensington (2019–2024)
- Holly Bruce (1993-), MSP for Glasgow Southside (2026-)
