= Cyril Philips =

British historian (1912–2005)

Sir Cyril Henry Philips, FRAS (27 December 1912, Worcester – 29 December 2005, Swanage, Dorset), knighted in the 1974 New Years Honours List, was a noted British historian and academic director.

== Early life ==
His father had worked as an engine driver on the Indian railways, and Philips in the 1920s spent some years in Bihar.

He was educated first at Rock Ferry High School, and in 1931 he attended the University of Liverpool, graduating in 1934 with a first-class degree in history.

He then attended the School of Oriental Studies in London where he wrote a history thesis on the East India Company, in 1940, published as The East India Company: 1784–1834, which The Times described in his obituary as "a rich Namier-like analysis of the various interests in the court of directors as well as a study of its operations".

== Career ==
During the Second World War, he served in the Army Education Corps, ending the war as a lieutenant colonel.

He joined the School of Oriental and African Studies (SOAS), and soon became professor and head of the history department.

In 1957, he became director of SOAS, succeeding Sir Ralph Turner, where he "...virtually remade the school..." in the following years.

From 1972 to 1976, he was appointed vice-chancellor of the University of London, where he was involved in controversial reforms which shortened his tenure.

=== Royal Commission on Criminal Procedure ===
Philips chaired a Royal Commission on Criminal Procedure into the police and criminal evidence system, the police complaints board, and review of the Prevention of Terrorism Act during the years 1978 to 1981. Its terms of reference were to examine, having regard both to the interests of the community in bringing offenders to justice and to the rights and liberties of persons suspected or accused of crime, and taking into account also the need for the efficient and economical use of resources, whether changes are needed in England and Wales in:

- the powers and duties of the police in respect of the investigation of criminal offences and the rights and duties of suspect and accused persons, including the means by which these are secured;
- the process of and responsibility for the prosecution of criminal offences;
- other features of criminal procedure and evidence as relate to the above;
- and to make recommendations.

The commission held 50 full meetings, the first on 15 February 1978, and in addition set up three sub-committees

- the Research Committee, which engaged in the preliminary formulation of a research programme,
- a Law and Procedure Committee which prepared the supplementary volume of the Report describing existing arrangements, and
- a Drafting Committee which prepared drafts of the final Report for the approval of the full Commission.

The commission drew on evidence from four main sources: written submissions, oral evidence, visits by the Commission, and research. Oral evidence was taken in late 1979 and early 1980 on the basis of a consultative paper in order to test opinion on key issues already identified and proposed changes. Commissioners visited every police force in England and Wales and also many police stations and criminal courts in the United Kingdom and abroad. In addition, they initiated twelve research studies, which were published, and some smaller research projects by Commission staff, the results of which were incorporated in the Report.

== Bibliography ==
- Beyond the Ivory Tower, 1995 autobiography
- The East India Company: 1784–1834, 1940
- The young Wellington in India, 1972 Creighton memorial lecture on history, London, Athlone Press, 1973.

== See also ==
- List of Vice-Chancellors of the University of London

Academic offices
Preceded by Sir Ralph Lilley Turner	Director of SOAS University of London; 1957–1977	Succeeded by Philip Cowen
Preceded by Professor Sir Brian Windeyer	Vice-Chancellor of the University of London; 1972–1976	Succeeded by Sir Frank Hartley CBE (pharmacist)
