= Philip Pye-Smith =

English physician (1839–1914)

Philip Henry Pye-Smith
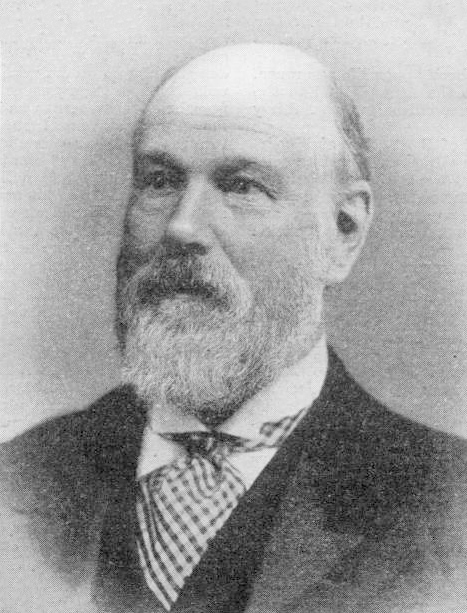
- Born: 30 August 1839; London, England
- Died: 23 May 1914 (aged 74); London, England
- Education: University of London
- Scientific career
- Fields: Medicine

Philip Henry Pye-Smith FRS FRCP (30 August 1839 – 23 May 1914) was an English physician, medical scientist and educator. His interest was physiology, specialising in skin diseases.

== Early life ==
Philip Pye-Smith was born in 1839 at Billiter Square, London EC3, England, the son of Ebenezer and Mary Anne Pye-Smith. He was educated at Mill Hill School and University College London before pursuing a medical career at Guy's Hospital and University of London.

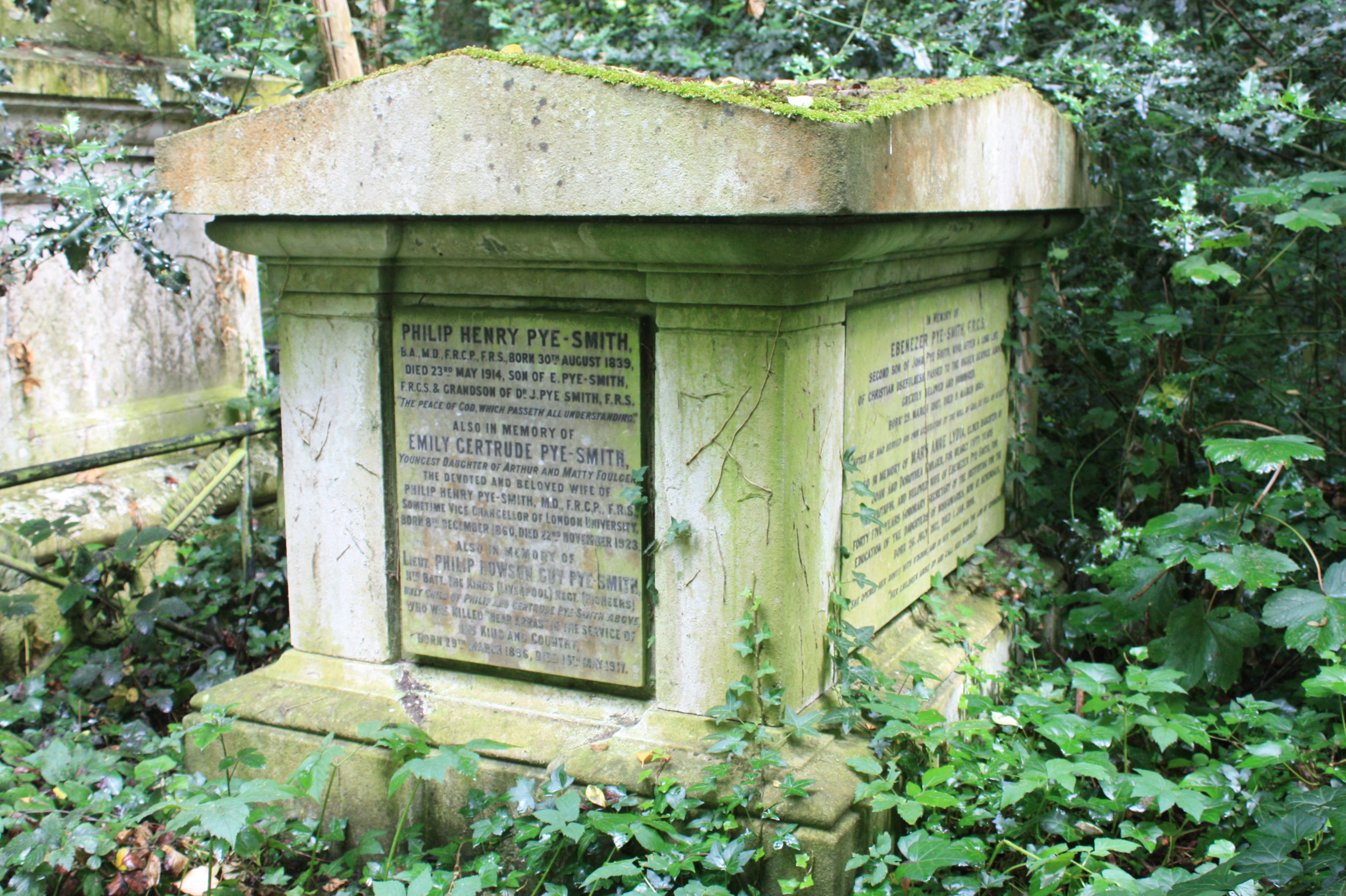
The Pye-Smith tomb in Abney Park Cemetery

== Career highlights ==
- Elected a Fellow of the Royal College of Physicians in 1870.
- Elected a Fellow of the Royal Society in 1886.
- Representative to Senate of the University of London from 1902 to 1908, and was vice-chancellor from 1903 to 1905.
- Representative to the General Medical Council from 1899 to 1909.
- Presentation of Lumleian lectures "The Ætiology of Disease" in 1892.
- Presentation of Harveian Oration "Pathology as the Basis of Rational Medicine" in 1893.
- Publication: An Introduction to the study of diseases of the skin in 1893.
- Publication: Revised Principles and practice of medicine by Charles Hilton Fagge in 1888.
- Vice-chancellor of University of London
- President of the Pathological Society of London, 1907

== Personal life ==
In 1894 he married Emily Gertrude Foulger (1860–1923), the daughter of Arthur Foulger and Martha Barclay.

Pye-Smith died in 1914 and was buried in the family tomb at Abney Park Cemetery, Stoke Newington in north-east London. The tomb lies on the east side of the main southern path known as Dr Watt's Walk. His wife, Emily Gertrude Pye-Smith lies with him. The grave also commemorates the loss of their only child, Lieutenant Phillip Howson Guy Pye-Smith of The King's (Liverpool Regiment), who was killed during the First World War's Battle of Arras on 15 May 1917.

In St. Mark, North Audley St, Westminster there are two stained-glass windows in the memory of Philip Henry Pye-Smith.

Academic offices
Preceded by Dr Archibald Robertson	Vice-Chancellor of University of London; 1903–1905	Succeeded by Sir Edward Henry Busk
