= Wendy Thomson =

Canadian-born public administrator and social policy researcher

Wendy Thomson CBE

Vice Chancellor of University of London
- In office 1 July 2019 – 29 April 2026
- Preceded by: Peter Kopelman (acting)
- Succeeded by: David Latchman (acting)

Personal details
- Born: 28 October 1953 (age 72) Montreal, Quebec, Canada
- Education: McGill University (BSW, MSW); University of Bristol (PhD)

Wendy Thomson CBE (born 28 October 1953) is a Canadian-born public administrator and social policy researcher in Canada and the UK.

Thomson was the managing director of Norfolk County Council from 2014 until the end of 2018. From July 2019 until April 2026, she served as vice-chancellor of the University of London, from which she was suspended between May 2025 and April 2026 because of allegations of her bullying and poor leadership.

== Life and career ==
Thomson was born in 1953 at Montreal, Canada. She studied at McGill University, graduating with Bachelor of Social Work (BSW) and Master of Social Work (MSW) degrees. In Canada, she worked for various charities and other organisations involved in social services, including Centraide.

Thomson moved to the United Kingdom in the 1980s, where she worked for the Greater London Authority before becoming assistant chief executive of Islington London Borough Council (1987–1993). During this time, she undertook studies for a Doctor of Philosophy (PhD) degree in social administration at the University of Bristol, which she completed in 1989. From 1993 to 1995, she was chief executive of the charity Turning Point. She then returned to local government as chief executive of Newham London Borough Council before becoming director of the Audit Commission. From 2001 to 2005, she served as the head of the Office of Public Service Reform in the Cabinet Office during Tony Blair's second government: she was appointed a Commander of the Order of the British Empire (CBE) in the 2005 New Year Honours in recognition of her work in this role.

She returned to Canada when she was appointed Professor of Social Policy and director of the School of Social Work at McGill University in Montreal in June 2005. Then, back in the UK, she was managing director of Norfolk County Council between August 2014 and December 2018.

From 1 July 2019 until April 2026, she was vice-chancellor of the University of London, and thereby its second woman head. In May 2025, she was suspended from the office of Vice Chancellor because of allegations of her bullying and poor leadership. She resigned from the office at the conclusion of the investigation, in April 2026, when she continued to dispute the allegations and launched a legal action against the University for "for constructive dismissal and alleged detrimental treatment after she made whistleblowing disclosures."

== See also ==
- List of Vice-Chancellors of the University of London

Academic offices
Preceded by Peter Kopelman	Vice-Chancellor, University of London; 2019 to 2026	Succeeded by Vacant
Business positions
Preceded by Derek Atha	CEO; Turning Point; 1993 to 1996	Succeeded by Andrew Blake
