= Charles Hilton Fagge =

English physician

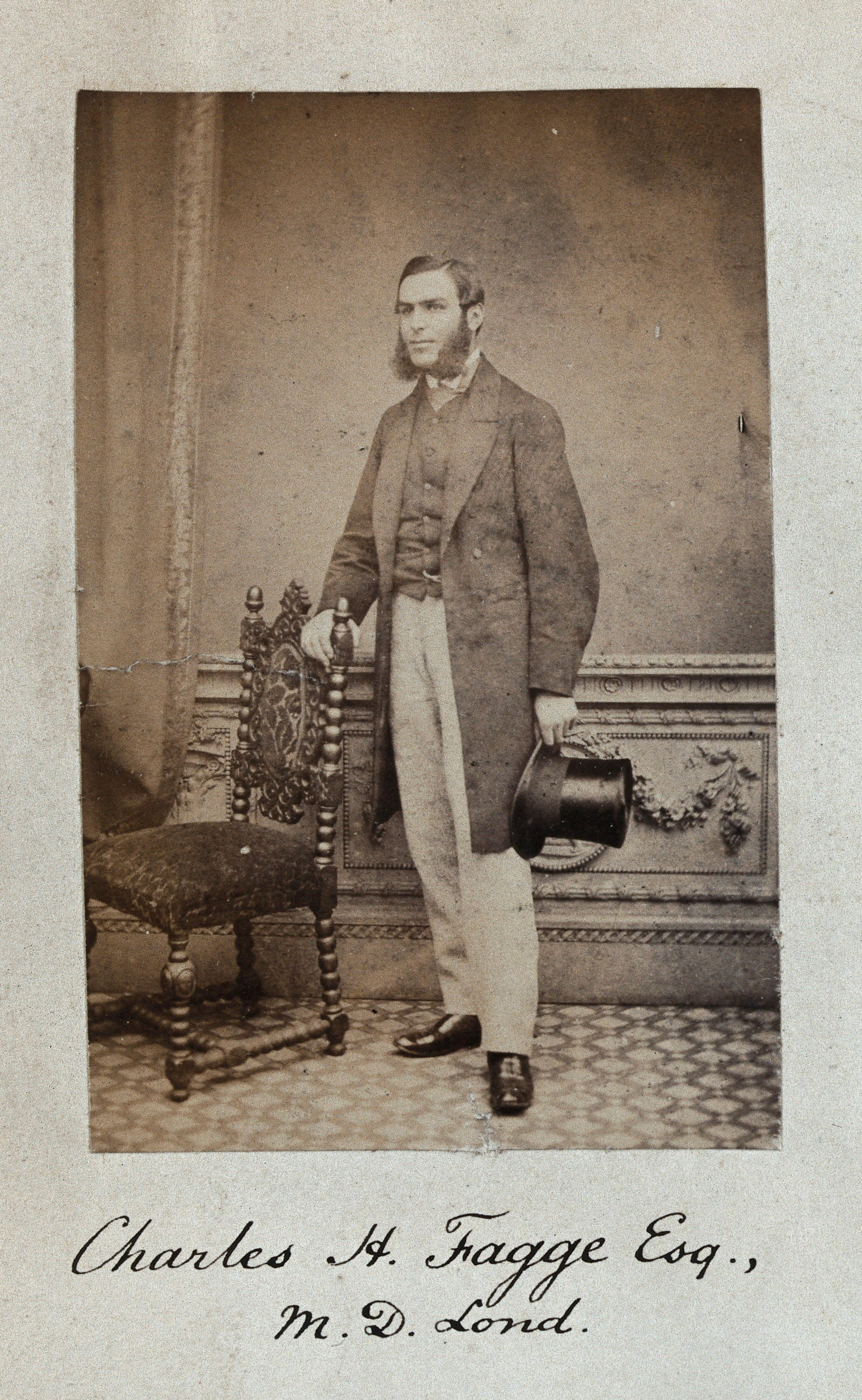
Credit: Wellcome Collection

Charles Hilton Fagge (1838–1883) was an English physician.

== Life ==
Fagge was the son of Charles Fagge, a medical practitioner, and nephew of John Hilton. He was born in Hythe, Kent on 30 June 1838. Fagge entered Guy's Hospital medical school in October 1856, and in 1859, at the first M.B. examination at the university of London, gained three scholarships and gold medals; in 1861, at the final M.B. examination, he gained scholarships and gold medals for medicine and for physiology, and a gold medal for surgery. In 1863 he graduated M.D., in 1864 became a member, and in 1870 a fellow of the Royal College of Physicians.

After being demonstrator of anatomy from 1862 to 1866, Fagge became medical registrar of Guy's in 1866, assistant physician in 1867, and physician in 1880. He was for some years demonstrator of morbid anatomy, lecturer on pathology, and curator of the museum at Guy's. He for some years edited the Guy's Hospital Reports, and at the time of his death was examiner in medicine to the university of London. For about a year and a half he had suffered from aneurysm of the aorta, but he continued to work on his treatise on medicine, which had occupied him for twelve years or more. He had been occupied on the last day of his life in reading examination papers, when he was seized with difficulty of breathing, and died in half an hour on 18 November 1883, at his house in Grosvenor Street, in his forty-sixth year. He left a widow and two daughters. He was buried at West Norwood Cemetery and a bronze memorial tablet erected in the museum of Guy's Hospital.

== Works ==
He wrote original papers and his Principles and Practice of Medicine, published in 1886, with additions by Samuel Wilks and Philip Henry Pye-Smith (editor). He translated the first volume of Ferdinand Ritter von Hebra's work on cutaneous diseases into English for the New Sydenham Society, and classified and catalogued the models of skin diseases in the museum of Guy's Hospital. He contributed papers on skin diseases to the 'Guy's Hospital Reports,’ the major one being 'On Scleriasis and Allied Affections,’ 1867. An article on 'Intestinal Obstruction' appeared in the same reports in 1868. He wrote the article on 'Valvular Disease of the Heart' in Sir John Russell Reynolds's 'System of Medicine' (vol. iv.); others in the area were on 'Mitral Contraction,’ 'Acute Dilatation of the Stomach,’ 'Abdominal Abscess,’ and on 'Fibroid Disease of the Heart' ('Transactions of the Pathological Society,’ xxv. 64–98).

With Dr. Thomas Stevenson, he made a series of researches on the application of physiological tests for digitaline and other poisons (Proc. Roy. Soc. 1865; Guy's Hospital Reports, 1866).
