= Edward Henry Busk =

Sir Edward Henry Busk (10 February 1844 – 4 November 1926) was Vice Chancellor of London University from 1905 to 1907.

== Early life ==
Busk was the son of barrister Henry William Busk (grandson of Wadsworth Busk) and Mary Ann Le Breton (daughter of the Rev Philip Le Breton of Jersey), and the brother of Henrietta Busk and Mary Jane Busk. The family lived at Great Ormond Street in Bloomsbury. Busk was educated at University College School in Hampstead, London. He then attended University College London (BA, first class, 1863; MA, 1864) and then at Manchester New College (now Harris Manchester College, Oxford) (LLB first class, 1866).

== Career ==
Busk practised as a solicitor from 1866 to 1899. He was vice-chancellor of the University of London from 1905 to 1907, chairman of convocation and a fellow of the university and also of University College, London. He was also a member of the governing body of the Imperial College of Science and Technology, chairman of council of the City and Guilds of London Institute (1925), chairman of the Central Foundation Schools of London, and chairman of the governing body of Gresham's School between 1900 and 1925, when he resigned on the grounds of ill health.

He was among the new knights announced in the 1901 New Year Honours list, and was knighted by King Edward VII at Marlborough House on 9 February 1901.

== Personal life ==
His wife Marian Busk was a notable botanist, one of the first female graduates of Queen's College, London, and one of the first female fellows of the Linnean Society of London.

He died on 4 November 1926 at the age of 82 and was buried in Checkendon Churchyard, Oxfordshire.

== See also ==
- List of Vice-Chancellors of the University of London

Academic offices
Preceded by Dr Philip Henry Pye-Smith	Vice-Chancellor of the University of London; 1905-1907	Succeeded by Sir William Job Collins
