= David Latchman =

British geneticist

David Latchman CBE

Vice-Chancellor of University of London
- Acting
- Assumed office 27 May 2025
- Preceded by: Wendy Thomson (Suspended)

Vice-Chancellor of Birkbeck, University of London
- In office 1 January 2003 – 31 December 2023
- Chancellor: Anne, Princess Royal
- Preceded by: Timothy O'Shea (Master)
- Succeeded by: Sally Wheeler

Personal details
- Born: David Seymour Latchman; 22 January 1956 (age 70) London, England
- Education: University of Cambridge (BA, MA, PhD); University of London (DSc)

David Seymour Latchman CBE (born 22 January 1956) is a British geneticist and university administrator. From 2003 to 2023 he has been Vice-Chancellor of Birkbeck, University of London, and since 1999 professor of genetics at University College London. Since 2025, he has served as Acting Vice-Chancellor of the University of London, following the suspension of incumbent Vice-Chancellor Wendy Thomson over allegations of bullying and poor leadership.

== Early life and education ==
Born into a Jewish family, he is nephew and heir to the childless wealthy property developer Maurice Wohl and is chair of the Maurice Wohl Charitable Foundation. As a child he attended Haberdashers' Boys' School. Subsequently, in 1978, he obtained Bachelor of Arts in Natural Sciences from Queens' College, Cambridge. In 1981 he was awarded by the University of Cambridge the degree of Doctor of Philosophy and in 1993 by University of London the higher doctorate, Doctor of Science.

== Career ==
Latchman worked in the medical molecular biology unit at University College London (UCL), and at Middlesex School of Medicine.

He has been professor of molecular pathology, and director of the Windeyer Institute of Medical Science, at UCL, and was dean of the Institute for Child Health (1999–2002).

He serves on several committees including London Development Agency (observer status); Universities UK Research Policy Network; National DNA Database Ethics Group; London First (board member).

As Master of Birkbeck, he voiced protest at UK government proposals to cut funding for second degrees. Latchman was also a vocal advocate for part time degrees and government support to improve access for adults to higher education.

Latchman was appointed Commander of the Order of the British Empire (CBE) in the 2010 Birthday Honours for services to higher education.

Beginning in 2014, Latchman’s laboratory at UCL Institute of Child Health came under scrutiny after an anonymous whistleblower alleged that dozens of papers from the lab were doctored. Two screening expert panels in 2014 and 2015 found evidence of research fraud in 14 papers from 1990 to 2013. Even though the two investigations found no evidence that he intended to commit fraud or was aware of the fraud, they found he had been reckless in his running of the lab and co-authoring on the research and upheld an allegation of research misconduct against him. A 2018 disciplinary hearing concluded that there were insufficient grounds for any formal action against him, noting that fraud was difficult to detect and urged senior research leaders to consider when to stop being named authors on papers. As of 2020, 6 papers have been retracted and 2 papers have been corrected. Colleagues called for his resignation, but Latchman remained a part-time professor of human genetics at UCL, and master of Birkbeck. He no longer has a lab and has stopped supervising research.

Following his twenty years vice-chancellorship at Birkbeck, in 2024, he assumed the position of the Deputy Vice-Chancellor at the University of London, which is federal university consisting of seventeen member universities. As a Deputy Vice-Chancellor of the University of London, he is responsible for supporting the Board of Trustees of the University of London.

On May 27, 2025, he assumed the role of Acting Vice-Chancellor of the University of London, following the suspension of the incumbent Vice-Chancellor, Wendy Thomson, over allegations of bullying and poor leadership. Since then, he has been serving in this capacity while the university addresses the concerns surrounding its leadership.
