= John Lockwood (classicist) =

Sir John Francis Lockwood (6 July 1903 – 11 July 1965) was Master of Birkbeck College, London, from 1951 to 1965, and Vice-Chancellor of the University of London from 1955 to 1958 In 1965 he produced a controversial report known as "The Lockwood Report" which concerned the foundation of what became the University of Ulster.

== Early life and education ==
He was born in Preston, Lancashire, an only son and elder child of John Lockwood, a stockbroker, and his wife, Elizabeth Speight. He attended Preston Grammar School and in 1922 he was awarded a classical scholarship at Corpus Christi College, Oxford gaining first class honours in Classics and second class honours in literae humaniores in 1926.

== Career ==
He was briefly a lecturer in Latin at the University of Manchester. In 1927, he joined University College, London as senior assistant lecturer in classics and then lecturer in Greek in 1940 when the classics department moved to Aberystwyth during the Second World War. He became a reader and in 1945 returned to London as professor of Latin.

In 1950, he became the Dean of London University's Faculty of Arts and later joined a committee administering relationship with African and West Indies colleges. He became Master of Birkbeck College in 1951, later deputy Vice-Chancellor and then Vice-Chancellor in 1955. He travelled widely forging links with colleges in the United States and former British colonies in East Africa.

== The Lockwood Report ==
In February 1965, as chairman of a government committee, he published what was known as "The Lockwood Report". The Government's terms of reference for this were: "To review the facilities for university...education in Northern Ireland...and to make recommendations".

The committee's remit did not include making recommendations about any sites for any new institutions. However, the committee did make a recommendation for the location of a new university: Coleraine, a Protestant-dominated area in the east, and this was accepted by the Government. It also recommended the closure of Magee College in Derry. Magee College had a largely Catholic student body and was easily accessible to the Catholic population of Derry. There was a strongly-held view in Derry, a predominantly Roman Catholic area with a much larger population, that the university should be established there and the sense of outrage was exacerbated by the fact that there had been no Roman Catholic member of the committee. The resulting protest was unprecedented: on 18 February the city of Derry virtually closed down and a motorised convoy of 1,500 vehicles drove the 90 miles to the seat of government at Stormont in Belfast to protest, but the institution was established in Coleraine as recommended in the report.

== Personal life ==
In 1929 Lockwood married Marjorie, daughter of William Basil Clitheroe, a headmaster, and they had a son and a daughter. He was knighted in 1962. He died at home in Winchmore Hill, in the London Borough of Enfield, then in Middlesex. His wife survived him.

== See also ==
- University of Ulster - History
- List of Vice-Chancellors of the University of London

Academic offices
| Preceded by Air Chief Marshal Sir Roderic Maxwell Hill MC | Vice-Chancellor of the University of London; 1955–1958 | Succeeded by Sir Charles Felix Harris |
