= Peter Kopelman =

British academic (1951–2021)

Peter Graham Kopelman (23 June 1951 – 9 July 2021) was a British medical researcher who served as interim Vice-Chancellor of the University of London from 8 June 2018 until 30 June 2019. A physician, educator and international research worker, Kopelman was principal of St George's, University of London (2008–15), having previously been vice-principal of Queen Mary, University of London, and deputy warden of Barts and The London School of Medicine and Dentistry (2001–06), and Dean of the Faculty of Health, University of East Anglia (2006–08).

== Background ==
The elder son of Harry Kopelman and Joan née Knowlman, he was educated at Felsted School before studying medicine at St George's Hospital Medical School.

Kopelman had a long-standing interest in diabetes care and initiated a district-wide scheme for integrated care in east London. Kopelman chaired the Clinical Examining Board of the Royal College of Physicians (UK) and the NHIR Academic Careers Panel. He was chairman of the Royal Pharmaceutical Society Faculty & Education Board and Health Education England’s Oversight Board for Medical Associate Professionals.

Kopelman’s major research interest was in the field of obesity, in particular endocrine aspects and possible genetic determinants. He was also interested in the pathophysiology of associated complications and their management. He was a Past Chairman of the Association for the Study of Obesity, President of the European Association for the Study of Obesity, a Trustee of the International Association for the Study of Obesity and a member of the Department of Health and Food Standards Agency Scientific Advisory Committee on Nutrition. He was a member of the Chief Medical Officer’s Working Group on physical activity. He was chairman of the Royal College of Physicians Committee on Nutrition and chaired the College’s Working Party on the management of obesity with particular reference to drug therapy. He also chaired the College’s Working Party on nutritional care of patients that resulted in the publication of a report entitled Nutrition and Patients – a Doctor’s Responsibility.

== Family ==
Kopelman married Susan Lewis in 1981, and they had two daughters and a son.

== See also ==
- Vice-Chancellors of the University of London

Academic offices
Preceded by Sir Adrian Smith	50th Vice-Chancellor of the University of London; 2018–2019	Succeeded by Professor Wendy Thomson
