= Stowe School =

Public school in Stowe, Buckinghamshire, England

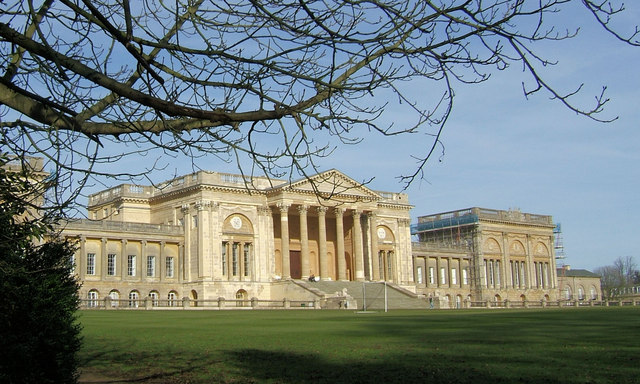
- Stowe House was completed by 1779.

Location
- Stowe, Buckinghamshire, MK18 5EH; England; 52.0326°N 1.0190°W

Information
- Type: Public school Private school, day & boarding
- Motto: Latin: Persto et Praesto (I stand firm and I stand first)
- Religious affiliation: Church of England
- Established: 11 May 1923
- Local authority: Buckinghamshire
- Department for Education URN: 110548 Tables
- Chairman of governors: Simon Creedy-Smith
- Headmaster: Anthony Wallersteiner
- Staff: 207
- Gender: Co-educational
- Age: 13 to 18
- Enrolment: 915
- Student to teacher ratio: 6:1
- Campus size: 750-acre (300 ha)
- Campus type: Semi-rural
- Publication: The Stoic
- Budget: £43,993,611 (2024)
- Revenue: £51,352,198 (2024)
- Affiliations: G30 Schools; HMC; The Rugby Group
- Alumni: Old Stoics
- School fees: £58,560.00 per year US$77,333.33 per year
- Website: stowe.co.uk/school

Stowe School is a public school (English private boarding school) for pupils aged 13–18 in the countryside of Stowe, Buckinghamshire, England. It was opened on 11 May 1923 at Stowe House, a Grade I Heritage Estate belonging to the British Crown. Formerly the country seat of the Dukes of Buckingham and Chandos, it was first constructed in 1677 and served as a consulate to monarchy and aristocracy throughout the 18th and 19th centuries. J. F. Roxburgh was the school's first headmaster.

The school is a member of the 18-member Rugby Group, the Headmasters' and Headmistresses' Conference, and the G30 Schools. Originally for boys only, the school is now coeducational, with 541 boys and 374 girls – 915 students enrolled in the school as of September 2023. Roughly 80% of the school's pupils are in boarding houses, while the other 20% are in day houses.

Pupils in the "Day in Boarding" programme are assigned to one of the school's boarding houses and have the option to board there for a maximum of three nights per week. Pupils in one of the school's three Day Houses—Winton, Cheshire, and Croft—are charged a reduced fee per academic year. Students in the Day houses are not given the option to board. The school provides bursaries and other means of financial assistance to admitted students who exhibit outstanding abilities in the Arts, Academics, Sports, and other areas. A typical scholarship at Stowe is worth 5% of the school fee.

The tuition fee includes the provision of meals (breakfast, lunch, and dinner), educational services, and "extracurricular activities". In some instances, it also covers boarding accommodation. Additional costs, such as school uniforms, equipment, trips, and transportation (such as airport transfers and bus services), are billed at the end of each term in addition to the tuition fee. These extra costs can range from a few hundred to a few thousand pounds per term.

== History ==
Stowe School opened in 1923. The main building is Stowe House, whose exterior was completed by 1779. Funding for the school came through the Rev. Percy Warrington and the Martyrs Memorial Trust. The school's first architect was Clough Williams-Ellis.

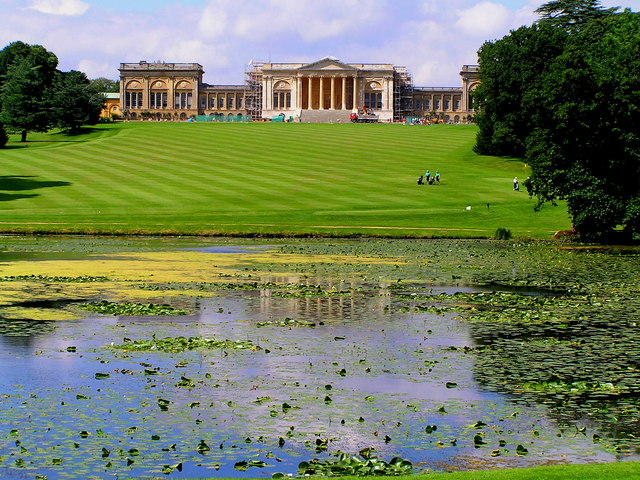
Stowe School

The first Headmaster was J. F. Roxburgh. He aimed to focus on the individual child and introduce them to beauty and learning; he wanted a civilised school founded on Christian values.

The Beatles played a concert at Stowe School on 4 April 1963. A recording of the concert was revealed in 2023, and leaked to the public later in the year.

=== Today ===
The school's cricket ground is used as a first class ground by Northamptonshire CCC.

The Stowe Corner of Silverstone Circuit is the closest corner to the school and is named after the school.

A Southern Railway "Schools Class" steam locomotive, No. 928, which was built in 1934 was named after the school, and is preserved at the Bluebell Railway in East Sussex.

In 2005, the school was investigated by the Office of Fair Trading for "price fixing", participating in a "fee-fixing cartel".

In 2016, a Daily Telegraph investigator posing as a parent of a Russian pupil was told by the then school registrar that while pupils would always be expected to pass the entrance exam, it would help secure a place if a borderline child's parents were able to donate "about £100,000 or something like that."

== Boarding houses ==
There are thirteen Boarding Houses: 7 boys' houses and 6 girls' houses. There are also three Day Houses - 2 boys' houses and 1 girls' house. The boarding houses are mostly named after members of the family of Duke of Buckingham and Chandos. Each house has a number or letter assigned to it, for use as the first character of each student's school number. For instance, a student in Bruce House would have their student number start with 1.

Name	Boys or Girls	Named after	Number/ Letter
Bruce	(Girls)	Lady Mary Bruce (1710–1738), the daughter of Charles Bruce, 4th Earl of Elgin. Formerly a boys house from 1923 to 2024, and was renovated and reopened as a girls house in September 2025	1
Temple	(Boys)	Richard Temple, 1st Viscount Cobham; Earl Temple	2
Grenville	(Boys)	George Grenville	3
Chandos	(Boys)	Richard Temple-Nugent-Brydges-Chandos-Grenville, 1st Duke of Buckingham and Chandos	4
Cobham	(Boys)	Viscount Cobham; Original building renovated after construction of a new building, opened in early 2019, with the old Cobham location being used as the site for Winton and Cheshire	5
Chatham	(Boys)	William Pitt, 1st Earl of Chatham	6
Grafton	(Boys)	Duke of Grafton and/or the local fox hunt, the Grafton Hunt, which takes its name from him. Grafton House has a history of supplying the Stowe Beagles with Masters and Hunt Staff	7
Walpole	(Boys)	Robert Walpole, Prime Minister, and/or his son Horace Walpole, who wrote letters about his visits to Stowe House in the 18th century.	8
Nugent	(Girls)	Lady Mary Nugent, daughter of Robert Nugent, 1st Earl Nugent	N
Lyttelton	(Girls)	Baron Lyttelton	0
Queen's	(Girls)	Officially opened by Queen Elizabeth II in November 2007.	A
Stanhope	(Girls)	Opened in May 2009 and officially opened by Sir Nicholas Winton.	B
West	(Girls)	Opened in September 2014 as a Sixth Form House. Named after Gilbert West.	W
Winton	(Boys)	Opened in September 2019 as a day house for boys. Named after Sir Nicholas Winton.	9
Cheshire	(Girls)	Opened in September 2019 as a day house for girls. Named after Leonard Cheshire.	C
Croft	(Boys)	Opened in September 2023 as a day house for Boys. Named after Colonel Andrew Croft.	T

== Cricket ground ==
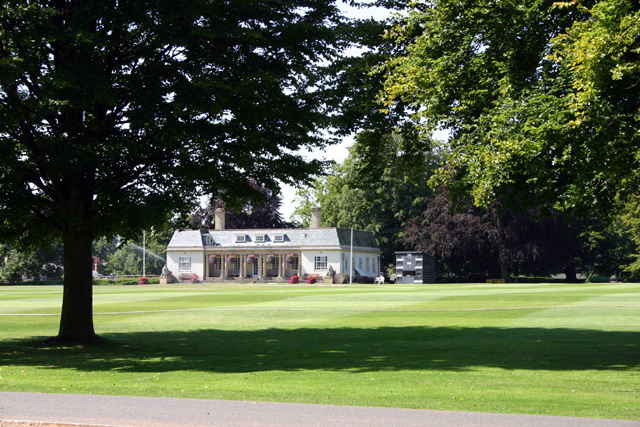
Cricket pavilion and pitch

The first recorded match on the school cricket ground came in 1928 when Stowe School played St Paul's School. Buckinghamshire played their first Minor Counties Championship match there in 1947, when the opponents were Berkshire. Between 1947 and 1982 the ground held five Minor Counties Championship matches, the last of which saw Buckinghamshire draw against Bedfordshire. The ground has also hosted a single MCCA Knockout Trophy match which saw Buckinghamshire play Bedfordshire.

The ground has also held a single List A match for Northamptonshire in the 2005 totesport League, against Gloucestershire. and has held fourteen Second XI fixtures for the Northamptonshire Second XI in the Second XI Championship and Second XI Trophy.

== Headmasters ==
- 1923–1949: J. F. Roxburgh
- 1949–1958: Eric Reynolds
- 1958–1964: Donald Crichton-Miller
- 1964–1979: Robert Drayson
- 1979–1989: Christopher Turner
- 1989–2003: Jeremy Nichols
- 2003–present: Anthony Wallersteiner

== Notable former pupils ==
Former pupils of Stowe School are known as Old Stoics. Toby Gauvain is currently the president of the Old Stoic Society.
Old Stoics include:

- Michael Alexander (1920–2004), British Army officer
- John Anderson (1918–1943), British Army officer and recipient of the Victoria Cross
- Noel Annan, Baron Annan (1916–2000), British intelligence officer and academic
- Adam Atkinson (born 1967), Bishop of Bradwell
- John Attlee, 3rd Earl Attlee (born 1956), Conservative politician and grandson of Prime Minister Clement Attlee
- George Barclay (1920–1942), Royal Air Force fighter pilot and World War II flying ace
- Alexander Bernstein, Baron Bernstein of Craigweil (1936–2010), British television executive and member of the Labour Party
- Oliver Bertram (1910–1975), English racing driver
- Richard Boston (1938–2006), English journalist and author
- John Boyd-Carpenter, Baron Boyd-Carpenter (1908–1998), Conservative politician
- Richard Branson (born 1950), British businessman
- Lyndon Brook (1926–2004), British actor
- Jack Brooksbank (born 1986), English businessman and husband of Princess Eugenie
- Simon Brown, Baron Brown of Eaton-under-Heywood (1937–2023), British barrister, judge and Justice of the Supreme Court
- Florence Brudenell-Bruce (born 1985), British actress and model
- Martin Buckmaster, 3rd Viscount Buckmaster (1921–2007), British diplomat
- James Burnell-Nugent (born 1949), Royal Navy officer and Commander-in-Chief Fleet
- Henry Cavill (born 1983), British actor
- Leonard Cheshire, Baron Cheshire (1917–1992), recipient of the Victoria Cross and founder of the Cheshire Foundation
- Oliver Churchill (1914–1997), SOE officer during World War II
- Simon Clegg (born 1959), British sports businessman, former CEO of the British Olympic Association and Ipswich Town Football Club
- Peter Coke (1913–2008), English actor, playwright and artist
- Oliver Colvile (1959–2025), Conservative politician and MP
- John C. Corlette (1911–1977), English architect, Gordonstoun teacher and founder of Aiglon College
- John Cornford (1915–1936), English poet and communist
- Andrew Croft (1906–1998), SOE officer during World War II and Arctic explorer
- Joanna "Jo" da Silva (born 1967), engineer and founder of Arup International Development Group
- Chelsy Davy (born 1985), Zimbabwean businesswoman and former girlfriend of Prince Harry
- Michael Deeley (born 1932), British film producer and Academy Award winner
- Robin Devereux, 19th Viscount Hereford (born 1975)
- Simon Digby (1932–2010), English oriental scholar
- Roland "Roly" Drower (1953–2008), English software engineer, journalist, activist, poet and composer
- Ben Duckett (born 1994), English cricketer
- Hugh Dundas (1920–1995), Royal Air Force fighter pilot and broadcasting executive
- John Dundas (1915–1945), Royal Air Force fighter pilot and World War II flying ace
- John David Eaton (1909–1973), Canadian businessman
- Alex Farquharson, British curator and art critic
- Thomas Firbank (1910–2000), Welsh-Canadian author, farmer and military officer
- Gareth Forwood (1945–2007), British actor
- David Foster (1920–2010), Royal Navy pilot and business executive
- Reginald "Reg" Gadney (1941–2018), English painter and thriller-writer
- Howard Goodall (born 1958), English composer
- Michael Grade, Baron Grade of Yarmouth (born 1943), English television executive and businessman
- Harry Gregson-Williams (born 1961), British composer, conductor, orchestrator and record producer
- George Haig, 2nd Earl Haig (1918–2009)
- Rose Hanbury (born 1984), peeress, model and political staffer
- Edward Hardwicke (1932–2011), English actor
- Peter Hayman (1914–1992), British diplomat
- Jack Hayward (1923–2015), English businessman, philanthropist and former owner of Wolverhampton Wanderers
- Robert Heber-Percy (1911–1987), English eccentric
- Nicholas Henderson (1919–2009), British diplomat and writer
- Nigel Henderson (1917–1985), English documentary artist and photographer; asked to leave after burning a Union Flag
- John Henniker-Major, 8th Baron Henniker (1916–2004), British diplomat
- Annabel Heseltine (born 1963), British journalist
- Roger Hodgson (born 1950), English singer-songwriter and founding member of British rock band Supertramp
- Oscar Humphries (born 1981), Australian art dealer and journalist
- Robert Kee (1919–2013), British journalist, historian and writer
- John Kempe (1917–2010), Headmaster of Gordonstoun School and mountaineer
- Danny Kinahan (born 1958), Ulster Unionist politician and MP
- Adam King (born 1999), English cricketer
- Marc Koska (born 1961), English inventor
- Percy "Laddie" Belgrave Lucas (1915–1998), Royal Air Force officer, golfer, author and MP
- Nicholas Lyell, Baron Lyell of Markyate (1938–2010), English Conservative politician, Solicitor-General for England and Wales and Attorney-General for England, Wales and Northern Ireland
- Gavin Maxwell (1914–1969), British naturalist and author
- Alistair McAlpine, Baron McAlpine of West Green (1942–2014), British businessman, politician and author
- George Melly (1926–2007), English jazz singer, critic, writer, and art history lecturer
- Crispian Mills (born 1973), English singer-songwriter and film director
- Christopher Robin Milne (1920–1996), English author, bookseller and son of A. A. Milne
- George Monbiot (born 1963), British writer, journalist and activist
- Iain Moncreiffe, 11th Baronet (1919–1985), British officer of arms and genealogist
- Chandos Morgan (1920–1993), British priest, military chaplain and Archdeacon of the Royal Navy
- David Niven (1910–1983), British actor, author and military officer
- Edward Donough "Toby" O'Brien (1909–1979), British journalist, propaganda expert and spy
- Marilyn Okoro (born 1984), British track and field athlete
- George Parker, 8th Earl of Macclesfield (1914–1992)
- Dalton Philips (born 1968), Irish businessman
- Henry Pollock (born 2005), English rugby player and British and Irish Lions representative
- Anthony Quinton, Baron Quinton (1925–2010), British philosopher
- Rainier III, Prince of Monaco (1923–2005)
- Miranda Raison (born 1977), British actress
- James Reeves (1909–1978), British writer
- Graham Riddick (born 1955), Conservative politician and MP
- James Rudkin (born 1994), British rower
- Geoffrey Russell, 4th Baron Ampthill (1921–2011)
- John Sainsbury, Baron Sainsbury of Preston Candover (1927–2022), British businessman and politician
- David Shepherd (1931–2017), British artist and conservationist
- Tilly Smith (born 1994), 2004 Indian Ocean tsunami rescuer
- Lady Araminta Spencer-Churchill (born 2007), British equestrian and socialite
- David Stevens, Baron Stevens of Ludgate (born 1936), member of the UK Independence Party
- Edmund "Ed" Stoppard (born 1974), British actor
- Richard Sutton (born 1937), businessman
- Henrik Takkenberg (1967–2006), musician
- Karan Thapar (born 1955), Indian journalist
- Richard "Ric" Thorpe (born 1965), Bishop of Islington
- Simon Towneley (1921–2022), Lord Lieutenant of Lancashire
- Bubby Upton (born 1999), British equestrian
- Matthew Vaughn (born 1971), British director and producer
- Michael Ventris (1922–1956), English architect, classicist and philologist who deciphered Linear B
- Jon Vickers (1916–2008), British trade union leader
- Rollo Weeks (born 1987), British former actor
- Lorne Welch (1916–1998) WW2 pilot, Colditz POW and later glider pilot winning World Championships
- Laurence Whistler (1912–2000), English artist and poet
- Graeme White (born 1987), English cricketer
- Nicholas Winton (1909–2015), British stockbroker and humanitarian
- Henry Worsley (1960–2016), British explorer
- Peregrine Worsthorne (1923–2020), British journalist and writer
- David Wynne (1926–2014), British sculptor
- George Zambellas (born 1958), Royal Navy officer, First Sea Lord and Chief of the Naval Staff

=== Notable masters and staff ===
- Theodore Acland (1890–1960), housemaster 1924–1930; later headmaster of Norwich School
- T. H. White (1906–1964), English teacher 1932–1936; author known for his sequence of Arthurian novels, The Once and Future King, first published together in 1958. His novel Mistress Masham's Repose is set in a mansion with gardens inspired by Stowe
- Harry Gregson-Williams (born 1961), composer in residence 2012–2013; Old Stoic and Hollywood composer
- Peter Farquhar (1946–2015), English teacher 1983–2004; author and murder victim

== Coat of arms ==
Coat of arms of Stowe School
Notes Granted in 1923. Escutcheon Quarterly indented Argent and Or, first a lion rampant Azure, second a pile Gules, third a pile Vert thereon a cross of the second bearing five torteaux, fourth three martlets of the third. Motto Persto et praesto

== See also ==
- List of the Beatles' live performances
- List of schools in the South East of England
- List of independent schools in the United Kingdom
- List of boarding schools
- Aitchison College
