= Katherine Langrish =

British author

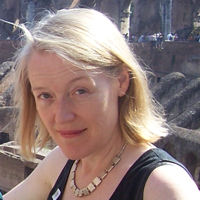
- Katherine Langrish in 2006
- Born: Newcastle upon Tyne, England
- Occupation: Author
- Writing career
- Genres: Children's literature, fantasy
- Website: www.katherinelangrish.co.uk

Katherine Langrish is a British author of fantasy for children and young adults. She was brought up in Yorkshire and Herefordshire, and wanted to be a writer from a young age. She was encouraged by her parents, and by the fact that her grandmother was a Yorkshire novelist and playwright of the 1930s, Leonora Thornber.

== Life ==
Langrish attended Ross on Wye Grammar School and Skipton Girls High School and gained a First Class Honours in English from the University of London as an external student. The university also awarded her the Sir Charles Harris Prize for the best results achieved. She went on to study medieval literature at University College and King's College, London, but did not take a further degree. She worked for six years in the Information Office at Lloyd's Register, London, before moving to France and then to the United States, where she became involved in oral storytelling to schoolchildren.

On returning to England in 1999, Langrish began writing Troll Fell, which was published to critical acclaim by HarperCollins in 2004. Her work is strongly influenced by British, Scandinavian and Celtic folklore and legends.

She is a member of the Society of Authors, the Scattered Authors Society, and the Society of Children's Writers and Illustrators Group. Her books have been published in Japan, Russia, the Czech Republic, Iceland, Spain, Italy, Brazil, the US, Australia and Canada. She is married with two daughters and lives in Oxfordshire.

== Selected works ==
=== Fiction ===
==== Troll Trilogy ====
- Troll Fell (2004) – - a New York Public Library 'One Hundred Titles for Reading and Sharing', winner of the London Academy & Wates Award 2005
- Troll Mill (2005) – a New York Public Library Book for the Teen Age
- Troll Blood (2007) – one of the School Library Association's Top 160 Books for Boys
- West of the Moon (HarperCollins 2011) (omnibus of the above)

==== Stand-alone ====
- Dark Angels (UK title), HarperCollins 2009, a.k.a.The Shadow Hunt (US title), 2010, a Junior Library Guild Selection Spring 2010, one of Kirkus Reviews' Best Books for Children 2010, nominated for the ALA's Best Fiction for Young Adults 2011

=== Nonfiction ===
- From Spare Oom to War Drobe: Travels in Narnia with my Nine-year-old Self (Darton, Longman and Todd Ltd, 2021)
