= Troll Fell =

2004 novel by Katherine Langrish

- Author: Katherine Langrish
- Language: English
- Series: Troll Trilogy
- Genre: Children's, Fantasy novel
- Published: June 7, 2004 (HarperCollins)
- Publication place: United Kingdom
- Media type: Print (hardback & paperback)
- Pages: 372pp
- ISBN: 0-00-717071-8 (first edition, hardback)
- OCLC: 56446423
- Followed by: Troll Mill

Troll Fell is a children's fantasy novel written by Katherine Langrish, the first in the Troll Trilogy which comprises Troll Fell, Troll Mill and Troll Blood. It is set in Viking Scandinavia and is centred about the eponymous mountain, which is infested with trolls.

== Synopsis ==
Troll Fell tells the story of young Peer Ulfsson, whose shipbuilder father has just died, and who is taken to live with his two wicked uncles, Balder and Grim, in a water mill under the shadow of Troll Fell, a mountain inhabited by trolls.

Peer's uncles make him do all the work around the mill, and at first he despairs, especially when he meets Granny Greenteeth, the sinister water-spirit who lives in the millpond. However, he is aided by the Nis (Norwegian Nisse), a mischievous though unpredictable house-spirit. His other friends are his dog, Loki, and Hilde, the pretty and confident daughter of Ralf Eiriksson, a nearby farmer.

Ralf has sailed away on the Viking ship which Peer's father built. In his absence, Peer and Hilde discover the plot which his two uncles are hatching: to sell children as slaves to the trolls, in exchange for gold. When Hilde's little brother and sister, Sigrid and Sigurd, are stolen away under cover of a blizzard, Peer and Hilde go together into the tunnels and under the mountain in an attempt to bring them back.

At the climax of the story, at a troll banquet when the troll king raises the top of the mountain on four red pillars, Peer is faced with the decision either to escape alone, or stay forever under the mountain with Hilde. Meanwhile, Ralf has returned from his voyage and, along with his crew and many of the neighbours, forces his way into the troll banqueting hall. There is a stand-off with the trolls. Finally Peer discovers a way to trick the king into making his uncles stay under the mountain in his and Hilde's place, and in gratitude Ralf invites him, with Loki and the Nis, to live with Hilde's family at the farm.

In the last pages, we learn that Ralf's voyage took him to Vinland in America, in a similar fashion to Leif Eriksson in the Saga of the Greenlanders.

== Background ==
The story is influenced by legends and folktales about trolls and nisses collected in Thomas Keightley’s ‘Fairy Mythology’, 1850, and William Craigie’s ‘Scandinavian Folklore’, 1896, as well as by Hans Christian Andersen’s story ‘The Elf Hill’, a satirical description of a troll wedding.
