= Frank Hartley (pharmacist) =

Sir Frank Hartley CBE
- Born: 5 January 1911; Nelson, Lancashire, England
- Died: 26 January 1997 (aged 86); Easenhall, Warwickshire, England
- Education: School of Pharmacy, London Birkbeck College, London
- Occupations: Pharmacist; Academic
- Spouse: Lydia May England (m. 1937; died 1996)
- Children: 2, including Frank

President of the Royal Institute of Chemistry
- In office 1965–1967
- Preceded by: Harry Julius Emeléus
- Succeeded by: Leslie Henry Williams

Vice Chancellor of University of London
- In office 1976–1978
- Preceded by: Sir Cyril Philips
- Succeeded by: Lord Annan

Sir Frank Hartley CBE (5 January 1911 – 26 January 1997) was a pharmacist who became Dean of the School of Pharmacy, University of London (1962–76) and later Vice-Chancellor of the university from 1976 to 1978.

== Early life and education ==
He was born in Nelson, Lancashire, England, the son of Robinson King Hartley, a plumber, and his wife, Mary, née Holt. His father died when he was five. He attended Nelson Municipal Secondary School until 1926 and then wanted to be a teacher. However, as he was deaf in one ear he was refused a bursary and instead did a three-year apprenticeship at a Nelson pharmacy. After completing his apprenticeship he competed for, and won, a Jacob Bell scholarship to study for the diploma of pharmaceutical chemistry at the School of Pharmacy in London (now part of University College London), qualifying in 1932, under Prof Wilfred Herbert Linnell. He then worked there as demonstrator and studied for a degree in chemistry at Birkbeck College, University of London, graduating in 1936 with first-class honours.

== Career ==
He initially taught at the School of Pharmacy whilst working for a PhD which he obtained in 1941. He then became chief chemist of the British laboratories of Organon, a company involved with steroids. From 1943 he was involved with maximizing penicillin production and also research. In 1946 he became director of research and scientific services at British Drug Houses (later merged with Merck KGaA) involving vitamin B12 and contraceptive steroids. In 1974 he became vice-chairman of the Medicines Commission and also served on various other committees.

In 1962 he became Dean of the School of Pharmacy, which had then become a school of the University of London. In 1965 he became President of the Royal Institute of Chemistry. He also took an active role in university affairs becoming Deputy Vice-Chancellor in 1973, and Vice-Chancellor in 1976. He was the first pharmacist to be an honorary member of the Royal Society of Physicians in 1979 and Royal College of Surgeons in 1980.

== Personal life ==
On 22 December 1937 he married Lydia May England (1909/10–1996), daughter of Mark England, a carpenter, of Hadleigh, Essex. They had two sons; Peter became a canon of the Church of England and his son Frank Robinson Hartley was Vice-Chancellor of Cranfield University from 1989 to 2006.

He was appointed CBE in 1970 and was knighted for services to pharmacy in 1977. He died at Easenhall, near Rugby, Warwickshire.

== See also ==
- List of Vice-Chancellors of the University of London

Academic offices
Preceded by Sir Cyril Philips	Vice-Chancellor of the University of London; 1976–78	Succeeded by Lord Annan
