= List of vice-chancellors of the University of London =

The office of Vice-Chancellor of the University of London was created by the Royal Charter of 1836, which founded the university. The role of the vice-chancellorship at the university has varied over the years in light of the successive changes to the constitution of the University of London, and has been greatly influenced by its federal nature. The following is a list of people who have been vice-chancellor of the University of London.

== Vice-chancellors ==
- 1836–1842 Sir John William Lubbock
- 1842–1862 Sir John Shaw-Lefevre
- 1862–1871 George Grote
- 1872–1880 Sir John Lubbock (Later Lord Avebury, son of the 1st Vice Chancellor)
- 1881–1883 Sir George Jessel
- 1883–1895 Sir James Paget
- 1895–1896 Sir Julian Goldsmid
- 1896–1902 Sir Henry Roscoe
- 1902–1903 Archibald Robertson
- 1903–1905 Philip Henry Pye-Smith
- 1905–1907 Sir Edward Henry Busk
- 1907–1909 Sir William Collins
- 1909–1911 Micaiah John Muller Hill
- 1911–1912 Sir William Collins
- 1912–1915 Sir Wilmot Herringham
- 1916–1917 Sir Alfred Pearce Gould
- 1917–1919 Sir (Edwin) Cooper Perry
- 1919–1922 Sir Sydney Russell-Wells
- 1922–1924 Sir Holburt Jacob Waring
- 1924–1926 Ernest Arthur Gardner
- 1926–1928 William Beveridge, Baron Beveridge
- 1928–1930 Sir Gregory Foster
- 1930–1932 J. Scott Lidgett
- 1932–1933 John Leigh Smeathman Hatton
- 1933–1935 Louis Napoleon George Filon
- 1935–1937 Sir Herbert Lightfoot Eason
- 1937–1939 Sir Robert Howson Pickard
- 1939–1945 Frank Horton
- 1945–1948 Sir David Hughes Parry
- 1948–1951 Dame Lillian Penson
- 1951–1953 Hugh Hale Bellot
- 1953–1954 Air Chief Marshal Sir Roderic Maxwell Hill
- 1955–1958 Sir John Francis Lockwood
- 1958–1961 Sir Charles Felix Harris
- 1961–1964 Sir Peter Scott Noble
- 1964–1967 Sir Thomas Percival Creed
- 1967–1969 Sir Owen Saunders
- 1969–1972 Sir Brian Windeyer
- 1972–1976 Sir Cyril Philips
- 1976–1978 Sir Frank Hartley
- 1978–1981 Noel Annan, Baron Annan
- 1981–1985 Sir Randolph Quirk
- 1985–1990 Brian Flowers, Baron Flowers
- 1990–1994 Stewart Sutherland, Baron Sutherland of Houndwood
- 1994–1997 Andrew Rutherford
- 1997–2003 Graham J Zellick
- 2003–2010 Sir Graeme Davies
- 2010–2012 Sir Geoffrey Crossick
- 2012–2018 Professor Sir Adrian Smith
- 2018–2019 Peter Kopelman (Acting)
- 2019–2026 Wendy Thomson (Suspended then resigned)
- 2025– David Latchman (Acting as deputy VC)
- 2026– vacant
