= J. F. Roxburgh =

Scottish schoolmaster and author (1888–1954)

John Fergusson Roxburgh (5 May 1888 – 6 May 1954) was a Scottish schoolmaster and author, first headmaster of Stowe School from 1923 to 1949.

== Early life ==
Roxburgh was a younger son of Archibald Roxburgh, an importer and merchant, by his marriage to Janet Briggs Cathcart, and was born in Edinburgh. He spent part of his childhood in Liverpool, and was educated in England, at Charterhouse School and Trinity College, Cambridge, where he took a first class degree in the Classical Tripos in 1910. He then spent a year at the Sorbonne and graduated L. ès L.

== Career ==
Roxburgh's first job was at Lancing College where he taught the young Evelyn Waugh. During the First World War he was turned down for service in the army, but in 1917 was finally accepted and joined the signal corps of the Royal Engineers. He saw action in 1918 and was mentioned in dispatches, while his younger brother Robert was killed at the Battle of Jutland.

In 1919 Roxburgh returned to Lancing as a housemaster. Early in 1923 he was appointed as the first headmaster of the emerging Stowe School, a project of E. H. Montauban, supported by the Martyrs' Memorial Trust. On 11 May 1923 the first boys arrived, and Roxburgh met each of them as he arrived. Stowe established high academic standards, with an especially strong reputation for music and art. Sports also flourished. Roxburgh was always a "teaching head" and made sure to teach every boy at some point in his time at the school, aiming to pass on his own enthusiasm for the best literature. He also believed that picturesque school grounds would ensure that every student would "know beauty when he sees it all his life."

Roxburgh's educational approach differed from most headmasters. Instead of corporal punishment, he addressed boys by their first names, let them ride bicycles, and encouraged their personal interests. David Niven, who was a student of his, wrote, "How he did this, I shall never know, but he made every single boy at that school feel that what he said and what he did were of real importance to the headmaster."

Roxburgh's goal was to develop students with good character and moral courage, young men that would be "acceptable at a dance and invaluable in a shipwreck."

The Second World War was a terrible shock to Roxburgh. He had never married and saw the extended school as his family. One eighth of his old boys were decorated during the war, but one in seven was killed.

He finally retired from the school in 1949, after twenty-six years as its head master. The school's old boys' association, the Old Stoics, presented him with him a clock, a car, and a cheque, which he whimsically interpreted as "a clock to tell him that his time was up, a motor-car to drive away, and journey-money enough to take him to the Antipodes." Appointing a Buckingham firm of auctioneers, he arranged a sale of numerous collectables surplus to his requirement on retirement. These included gifts he had accumulated over the years from grateful parents of boys at Stowe.

Roxburgh died at his cottage in Great Brickhill on 6 May 1954, accidentally drowned after a fall into the bath. His funeral took place at the school. His estate at death amounted to £44,671, a substantial sum at the time (Approximately £1,066,000 in 2017, when adjusted for inflation).

Noel Annan's biography of Roxburgh, Roxburgh of Stowe, was the last work reviewed by Evelyn Waugh, one of his old boys from Lancing, in The Observer on 17 October 1965.

== Personal life ==
His elder brother was Archibald Cathcart Roxburgh, a dermatologist and author of Common Skin Diseases.

== Major publications ==
- The Poetic Procession (1921)
- Eleutheros (1930)
