= Frank Robinson Hartley =

British academic

Frank Robinson Hartley FRSC FRAeS (born 29 January 1942) is a former vice-chancellor of Cranfield University (previously the Cranfield Institute of Technology) from 1989 to 2006.

== Early life and career ==
He was the son of Sir Frank Hartley CBE a former vice chancellor of London University. He was educated at King's College School, Wimbledon, London, and Magdalen College, Oxford.

== Career ==
He was post-doctoral fellow in protein chemistry at the Commonwealth Scientific and Industrial Research Organisation in Melbourne from 1966 to 1969. He was then Imperial Chemical Industries Research Fellow and tutor in physical chemistry at University College London from 1969 to 1970. From 1970 to 1975 he was lecturer in inorganic chemistry at the University of Southampton.

He then joined the Royal Military College of Science, Shrivenham (RMCS), as professor of chemistry and head of the department of chemistry and metallurgy from 1975 to 1982, acting dean from 1982 to 1984, principal and dean from 1984 to 1989. From 1989 to 1990 he was director of Cranfield Institute of Technology (CIT – later Cranfield University) which was incorporated by Royal Charter in 1969 – an academic partnership (RMCS) had been formed in 1984. He was vice-chancellor of Cranfield University from 1989 to 2006.

== Personal life ==
He married first, 1964, Valerie Peel (died 2005), and they had three daughters. He married second, 2009, Charmaine Harvey.

== Publications ==
- "The Chemistry of Platinum and Palladium", Applied Science, 1973
- "Elements of Organometallic Chemistry", Chemical Society, 1974, ISBN 0851869092 with C Burgess and R M Alcock
- "Solution Equilibria", 1985
- "The Chemistry of the Metal-Carbon Bond", Vol 1 1983, Vol 2 1984, Vol 3 1985, Vol 4 1987, Vol 5 1989 (with S Patel)
- "The Chemistry of Organophosphorus Coumpounds" Vol 2-4 1990-1996
- "Supported Metal Complexes" 1989
- "The chemistry of the Platinum Group Metals", 1991

Academic offices
Preceded by Henry Chilver, Baron Chilver; Founder	Frank Robinson Hartley; Vice Chancellor; Cranfield University; 1989-2006	Succeeded by Sir John (James) O'Reilly
