= Thomas Percival Creed =

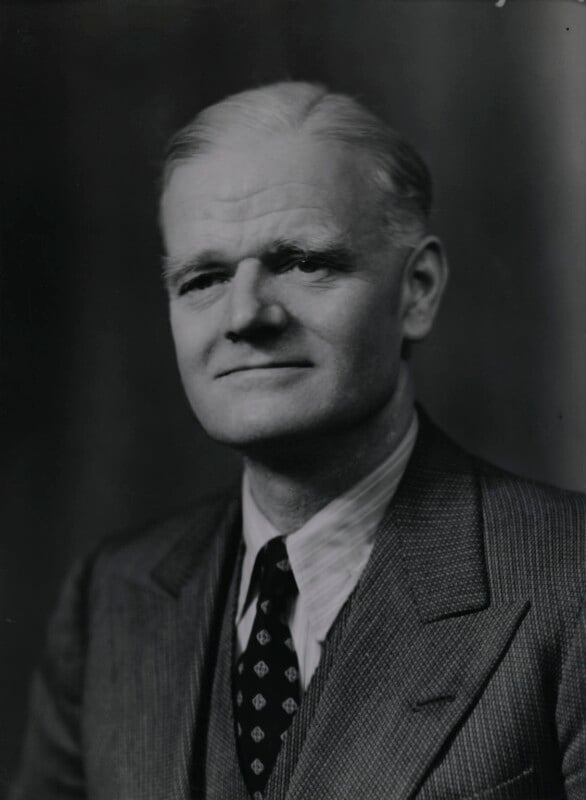
Creed in 1948

Sir Thomas Percival Creed, KBE, MC, QC (29 January 1897 – 11 May 1969) was a lawyer and educationist.

Principal of Queen Mary College London from 1952 to 1967, he served as vice-chancellor of the University of London from 1964 to 1967.

== Early life and education ==
The son of Rev. Colin Creed, curate of St Peter's Church, Braunstone, Leicester, later Rector of Farthinghoe, south Northamptonshire and Etheldreda Wright Spackman, daughter of a medical practitioner, from 1908 to 1915 he attended Wyggeston Grammar School for Boys, Leicester.

== War service and university ==
Commissioned into the Artists Rifles in 1915, he served during World War I in France, where he was wounded twice being awarded the MC in 1917.

In 1919 he went up to Pembroke College, Oxford, graduating as BA in 1922.

== Career ==
After Oxford Creed joined the Sudan political service, where he read for the Bar. In 1926 he became a District Judge and in 1928 was called to the Bar at Lincoln's Inn. In 1931 he was seconded to the Iraqi and became a Judge in Baghdad and held other positions in Kirkuk and Mosul. In 1935 he returned to Sudan as a High Court Judge in Khartoum, Chief Justice of Sudan (1935–1941) and Legal Secretary from 1941 to 1948. He was awarded the Order of the Nile in 1939, appointed CBE in 1943 and promoted KBE in 1946. In 1948 he retired from Sudan and took silk, before pursuing a career in education.

Creed became Secretary of King's College London in 1948 and Principal of Queen Mary College in 1952. From 1964 to 1967 he served as Vice-Chancellor of London University. His time there was a period of expansion but he managed to ensure the continued federal structure of the university.

== Personal life ==
In 1928 Creed married (Agnes) Margaret Brewis of St Helens (then Lancashire). They had one son and two daughters.

Sir Thomas died at his home in Allen Street, Kensington, London W8.

== See also ==
- List of Vice-Chancellors of the University of London
- List of British university chancellors and vice-chancellors

Academic offices
Preceded by Sir Peter Scott Noble	Vice-Chancellor of the University of London; 1964–1967	Succeeded by Sir Owen Saunders FRS
