= Paddy Nixon =

English computer scientist

6th Vice-Chancellor and President of the University of Canberra
- In office 6 April 2020 – 15 December 2023
- Chancellor: Tom Calma
- Preceded by: Deep Saini
- Succeeded by: Lucy Johnston (interim)

5th Vice-Chancellor and President of Ulster University
- In office July 2015 – February 2020
- Chancellor: James Nesbitt
- Preceded by: Richard Barnett
- Succeeded by: Paul Bartholomew

Personal details
- Born: Liverpool, England
- Education: University of Liverpool (BS); University of Sheffield (PhD); Trinity College Dublin (MA)
- Profession: Academic; Distributed Computing; Researcher

Paddy Nixon is a computer scientist and former Vice-Chancellor and President of the University of Canberra (2020–2023).

From July 2015 to February 2020, Nixon was Vice-Chancellor and President of Ulster University and on the board of Universities UK, chair of Universities Ireland and was on the Northern Ireland Council of the Confederation of British Industry. Prior to that he was Deputy Vice-Chancellor (Research) at the University of Tasmania.

== Background ==
Nixon is originally from Liverpool in England. He attended St. Anselm's College, obtained a B.Sc. (Hons) in computer science from University of Liverpool, a Ph.D. in computer engineering from University of Sheffield and M.A. from Trinity College Dublin. He is an elected Fellow of the British Computer Society, the Royal Society of Arts and the Royal Society of New South Wales.

== Career ==
=== Research and teaching ===
Nixon has held academic positions at Trinity College Dublin, University of Strathclyde, and University College Dublin. While at Trinity College he was Warden of Trinity Hall, Dublin.

His research specialism is large-scale distributed systems with a particular focus on software infrastructure including pervasive systems, sensor systems, middleware, web services, trust, and privacy. Nixon has published over 220 publications and edited 9 books.

Nixon was Science Foundation Ireland Research Professor in Distributed Systems at University College Dublin (2005–2010). He has extensive industry and commercial experience, collaborating with global high tech firms such as Microsoft, Oracle, IBM and Intel. He was an IBM faculty fellow at the Dublin Institute for Advanced Studies and from 2007 to 2010 he was Academic Director of Intel's Independent Living and Digital Health. He was also instrumental in the establishment UCD's Complex and Adaptive Systems Laboratory focusing on inter-disciplinary research at the intersection of mathematics, computation, and scientific discovery.

Nixon has been a visiting academic / professor at California Institute of Technology, University of Warsaw, and Kaunas University of Technology.

=== Technology transfer ===
Having been involved in three start-up companies, Nixon has a particular interest in the commercialisation of university research and the interface between universities and industry. In 2006 he led the consortium that bid for, and subsequently established, National Digital Research Centre; a national early stage investor in tech companies in Ireland.

=== Administration ===
Nixon was Deputy Vice-Chancellor (Research) at the University of Tasmania (2010–2015) and then Vice-Chancellor and President of Ulster University (2015–2020) and University of Canberra (2020–2023). Nixon's sudden departure from the University of Canberra attracted media attention when it was revealed that he received the highest remuneration of any vice-chancellor in Australia.
