= Brendan George McCormack =

Irish nursing academic (born 1962)

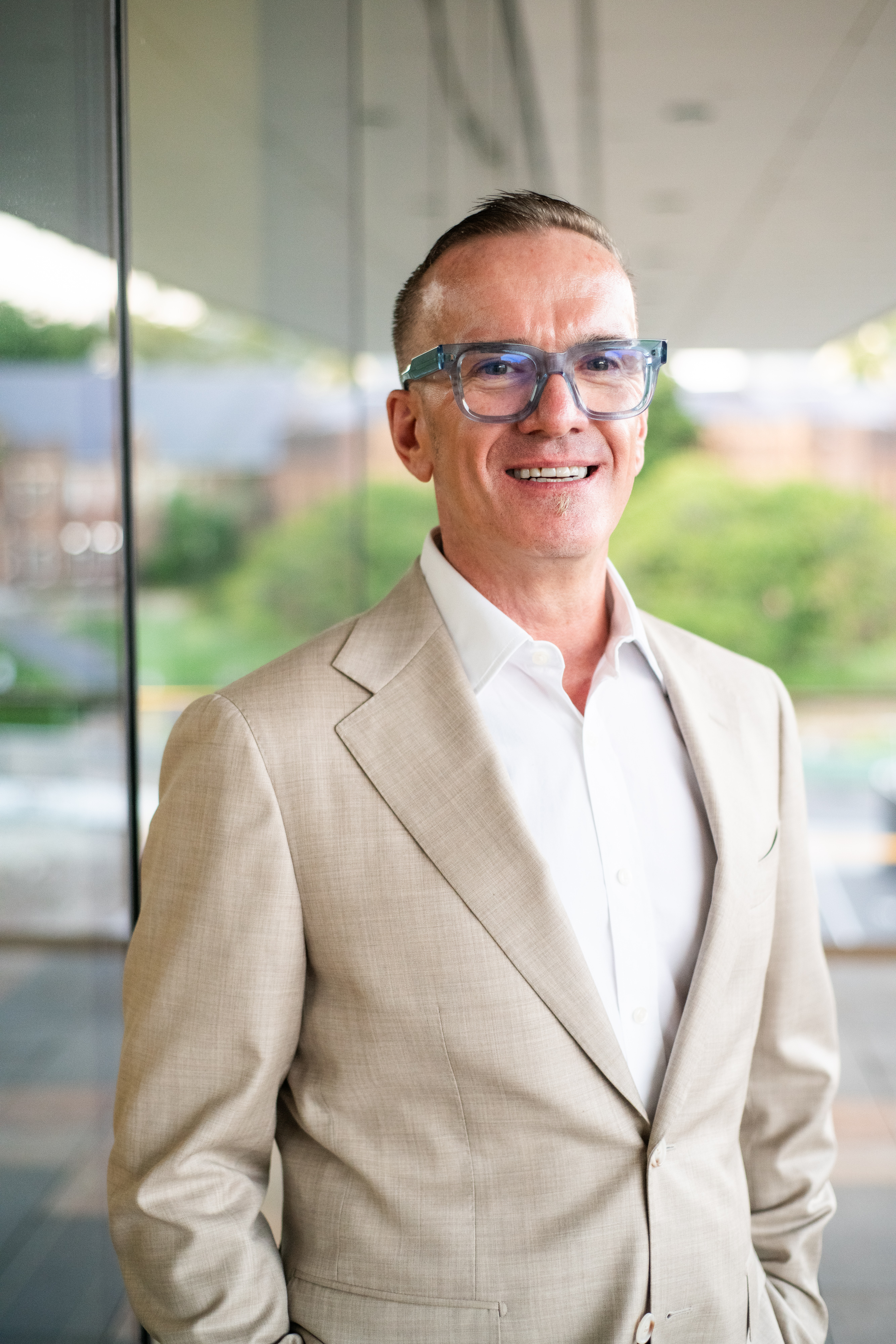
- Born: 11 August 1962 (age 64); Streamstown, County Westmeath
- Known for: Research in nursing and person-centred care

Academic background
- Education: Buckinghamshire New University; University of Surrey; University of Oxford

Academic work
- Discipline: Nursing
- Institutions: Susan Wakil School of Nursing and Midwifery, Faculty of Medicine and Health, University of Sydney

Brendan George McCormack (born 11 August 1962) is an Irish nursing academic. He is the head of the Susan Wakil School of Nursing and Midwifery and dean of the Faculty of Medicine and Health at the University of Sydney.

His research focuses on person-centredness with a particular focus on the development of person-centred cultures, practices and processes.

== Education ==
He holds a BSc in nursing from Buckinghamshire New University, a post graduate certificate in the education of adults from the University of Surrey and a DPhil in educational studies from the University of Oxford.

== Career ==
McCormack started out his career as a psychiatric staff nurse in St. Loman's Hospital, Mullingar, in Ireland. Following becoming a registered general nurse, McCormack moved to the Royal Berkshire Hospital in Reading, England, where he worked as a staff nurse in trauma orthopaedics and general medicine, before moving to Battle Hospital in Reading where he worked as a staff nurse in urology.

He then pursued a career in gerontology and dementia care in clinical practice, education, policy and research.

McCormack became the head of school and dean of the Susan Wakil School of Nursing and Midwifery and dean of the Faculty of Medicine and Health at the University of Sydney in May 2022.

Prior to this, McCormack was the professor of nursing and head of the divisions of nursing, paramedic science, occupational therapy and arts therapies of the School of Health Sciences at Queen Margaret University in Edinburgh from 2014 to 2022.

McCormack is currently head of the CARE Program (Championing Australia's Relational Economy) and participatory methods advisor at the Sydney Policy Lab, University of Sydney. The CARE program adopts a community-led and multidisciplinary approach to embedding person-centred principles, values, and practices in Australian public policy.

He serves as specialty chief editor of the Frontiers in Health Services section on patient-centred health systems, which advances research in implementation science, workforce development, and safety from a person-centred perspective.

Internationally, he holds or has held multiple honorary and visiting professorial appointments, including adjunct professor in nursing research at the Faculty of Health Sciences, Department of Regional Health Research, University of Southern Denmark (linked with Zealand University Hospital), professor of nursing at the University of Maribor (Slovenia), extraordinary professor in the Department of Nursing at the University of Pretoria (South Africa), professor II at Østfold University College (Norway), visiting professor at Ulster University (UK), and honorary professor of nursing at Queen Margaret University (Scotland). He was the founding editor of the International Journal of Older People Nursing and remains its editor emeritus.

McCormack's leadership roles have extended beyond academia into policy and sector advising: he was appointed as a commissioner on The Lancet Global Health Commission on People-Centred Care for Universal Health Coverage and has contributed to Lancet-affiliated initiatives and other international policy fora. His professional honours include fellowships of the Royal College of Nursing (UK), the European Academy of Nursing Science, the Royal College of Surgeons in Ireland, and the American Academy of Nursing; induction into the Sigma Theta Tau International Nurse Researcher Hall of Fame (2014); and recognition in major researcher listings for international impact.

== Research ==
McCormack's research programme is internationally recognised for advancing person-centred practice across theory, measurement, implementation and policy with a strong clinical focus on ageing, gerontological nursing and dementia care. Over more than two decades he has developed mid-range theory and practical conceptual frameworks (notably the Person-centred Practice Framework), along with instruments and evaluation tools that have been used to assess and embed person-centred cultures in hospitals, community services and residential aged care. He has led and co-led seventy-plus research and development projects worldwide, deploying participatory and action research methods and often integrating arts- and creativity-based approaches to engage staff, service users and communities.

His programmatic work at the University of Sydney includes leadership of the CARE program (Championing Australia's Relational Economy) within the Sydney Policy Lab, which pursues community-led policy and applied research to bring person-centred principles into public policy and care system redesign.

McCormack's frameworks and measures have been taken up in dozens of countries (commonly cited as 28+), and his scholarship has informed workforce development, aged-care reform, palliative care and broader people-centred health system debates including contributions to The Lancet Global Health Commission on People-Centred Care for Universal Health Coverage. He has authored more than 600–700 published outputs, including roughly 200–220 peer-reviewed journal articles and a dozen-plus books, and continues to publish, lead multi-disciplinary collaborations and advise health services and governments on translating person-centred evidence into practice and policy.

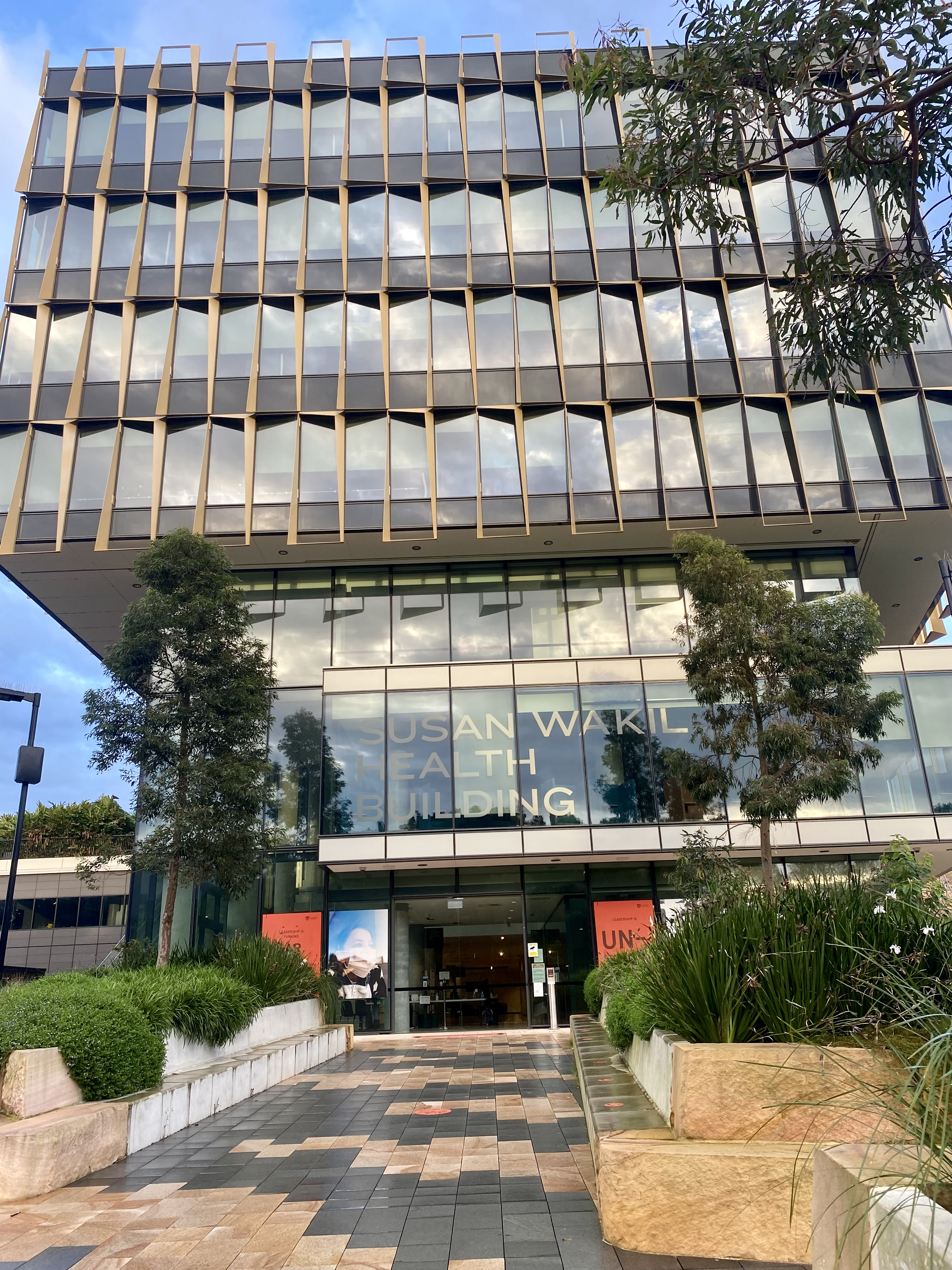
The Susan Wakil Health Building, The University of Sydney, Australia.

== Publications ==
McCormack has over 520 publications on Google Scholar which have been cited over 25,500 times giving him an h-index of 65. His top five highest cited articles are:

- Kitson, A.; Harvey, G.; McCormack, B. (1998). "Enabling the implementation of evidence based practice: a conceptual framework". BMJ Quality & Safety. 7 (3): 149–158. doi:10.1136/qshc.7.3.149. PMC 2483604. PMID 10185141.
- McCormack, B.; McCance, T. V. (2006). "Development of a framework for person-centred nursing". Journal of Advanced Nursing. 56: 472–479. doi:10.1111/j.1365-2648.2006.04042.x.
- Rycroft-Malone, J.; Seers, K.; Titchen, A.; Harvey, G.; Kitson, A.; Titchen, A. (2004). "What counts as evidence in evidence-based practice?". Journal of Advanced Nursing. 47 (1): 81–90. doi:10.1111/j.1365-2648.2004.03068.x. PMID 15186471.
- Kitson, A. L.; Rycroft-Malone, J.; Harvey, G.; McCormack, B.; Seers, K.; Titchen, A. (2008). "Evaluating the successful implementation of evidence into practice using the PARiHS framework: theoretical and practical challenges". Implementation Science. 3 (1) 1. doi:10.1186/1748-5908-3-1. PMC 2235887. PMID 18179688.
- McCormack, B.; Kitson, A.; Harvey, G.; Rycroft-Malone, J.; Titchen, A.; Seers, K. (April 2002). "Getting evidence into practice: the meaning of 'context'". Journal of Advanced Nursing. 38: 94–104. doi:10.1046/j.1365-2648.2002.02150.x.

=== Books ===
- Dewing, J.; McCormack, B.; McCance, T. (2021). Person-centred Nursing Research: Methodology, Methods and Outcomes, Springer Nature, Switzerland. doi:10.1007/978-3-030-27868-7
- McCormack, B.; McCance, T.; Martin, S.; McMillan, A.; Bulley, C. (2021) Fundamentals of Person-centred Healthcare Practice Wiley, Oxford.
- Titchen, A.; McCormack, B.; Tyagi, V. (2020). Dancing the Mandalas of Critical Creativity in Nursing and Healthcare. Centre for Person-centred Practice Research, Queen Margaret University Edinburgh.
- McCormack, B.; Eide, T.; Skovdal, K.; Eide, H; Kapstad, H.; and van Dulman, S. (2017). Person-centred Healthcare Research – 'The Person in Question': The Person-centred Research Handbook. Wiley Publishers, Oxford.
- McCormack, B. and McCance, T. (2017). Person-centred Nursing and Health Care – Theory and Practice. Wiley Publishing, Oxford.
- Dewing J, McCormack B and Titchen A (2014) Practice Development Workbook for Nursing, Health and Social Care Teams, Wiley-Blackwell Publishing, Oxford.
- McCormack B; Manley K and Titchen A (eds.) (2013) Practice Development in Nursing (Vol 2). Wiley-Blackwell Publishing, Oxford.
- McCormack B and McCance T (2010) Person-centred Nursing: Theory, models and methods. Blackwell Publishing, Oxford.
- Kent B and McCormack B (2010) An enabling context for evidence-based practice. Blackwell Publishing and Sigma Theta Tau International, Oxford.
- Hardy S, Manley K, Titchen A and McCormack B (eds.) (2009) Revealing Nursing Expertise through Practitioner Enquiry. Wiley-Blackwell Publishing, Oxford.
- Manley K, McCormack B and Wilson V (eds.) (2008) Practice Development in Nursing: International Perspectives. Blackwell Publishing, Oxford.
- McCormack B; Manley K and Garbett R (eds.) (2004) Practice Development in Nursing. Blackwell Publishing, Oxford.
- McCormack B (2001) Negotiating Partnerships with Older People - A Person-Centred Approach. Ashgate, Basingstoke
