= List of academic computer science departments =

School Name	Location	Country	Regional accreditation Board	Accreditation Level	Carnegie Basic Classification	BS Accreditation	Master's Program	Doctoral Program	Founding Date	Founders	Precursors
Aberystwyth University	Aberystwyth, Wales	United Kingdom				British Computer Society	MSc	PhD	1970		
Acadia University	Wolfville, Nova Scotia	Canada									
Electrical Engineering and Computer Science, Alabama A&M University	Normal, Alabama	USA	SACS-COC	Doctoral/3 or fewer		ABET	none	none			
University of Alabama	Tuscaloosa, Alabama	USA	SACS-COC	Doctoral/4 or more	RU/H	ABET	MS	PhD			
University of Alabama at Birmingham	Birmingham, Alabama	USA	SACS-COC	Doctoral/4 or more	RU/VH		MS	PhD			
University of Alabama in Huntsville	Huntsville, Alabama	USA	SACS-COC	Doctoral/3 or fewer	RU/H	ABET	MS	PhD			
University of Alaska	Fairbanks, Alaska	USA	NWCCU	A,B,M,D		ABET	MS	none			
American University in Cairo	Cairo	Egypt	MSACHE	Master's I		ABET	MS	none			
American University of Sharjah	Sharjah	UAE	MSACHE	Master's I		ABET	none	none			
Appalachian State University	Boone, North Carolina	USA	SACS-COC	Doctoral/3 or fewer		ABET	MS	none			
Arizona State University	Tempe, Arizona	USA	NCAHLC	B,M,D	RU/VH	ABET	MS	PhD			
University of Arizona	Tucson, Arizona	USA	NCAHLC	B,M,D	RU/VH		MS	PhD			
University of Arkansas	Fayetteville, Arkansas	USA	NCAHLC	B,M,D	RU/H	ABET	MS	PhD			
University of Arkansas at Little Rock	Little Rock, Arkansas	USA	NCAHLC	A,B,M,D		ABET	MS	none			
Armstrong Atlantic State University	Savannah, Georgia	USA	SACS-COC	Master's I		ABET					
Assam University	Silchar, Assam	India	UGC	Doctoral		UGC	M.S. (5 years Integrated) or MCS, Approved by UGC	Available			
Auburn University	Auburn, Alabama	USA	SACS-COC	Doctoral/4 or more	RU/H	ABET	MS	PhD			
Baylor University	Waco, Texas	USA	SACS-COC	Doctoral/4 or more		ABET	MS	none			
Berea College	Berea, Kentucky	USA	SACS	B		SACS					
Boise State University	Boise, Idaho	USA	NWCCU	A,B,M,D		ABET	MS	none			
Boston University	Boston, Massachusetts	USA	NEASC-CIHE	B,M,D	RU/VH		MA	PhD			
Bowie State University	Bowie, Maryland	USA	MSACHE	Master's I		ABET					
Brigham Young University	Provo, Utah	USA	NWCCU	A,B,M,D	RU/H	ABET	MS	PhD			
Brown University	Providence, Rhode Island	USA	NEASC-CIHE	B,M,D	RU/VH		ScM	PhD			
Bucknell University	Lewisburg, Pennsylvania	USA	MSACHE	Baccalaureate-Liberal Arts		ABET					
University of Calgary	Calgary, Alberta	Canada									
California Institute of Technology	Pasadena, California	USA	WASC-ACCJC	B,M,D(26)	RU/VH		none	PhD			
California Polytechnic State University	San Luis Obispo, California	USA	WASC-ACCJC	B,M		ABET					
California State Polytechnic University, Pomona	Pomona, California	USA	WASC-ACCJC	B,M		ABET	MS				
California State University, Chico	Chico, California	USA	WASC-ACCJC	B,M		ABET					
California State University, Dominguez Hills	Dominguez Hills, California	USA	WASC-ACCJC	B,M		ABET					
California State University, East Bay	Hayward, California	USA	WASC-ACCJC	B,M		none known	MS	none			
California State University, Fullerton	Fullerton, California	USA	WASC-ACCJC	B,M		ABET					
California State University, Long Beach	Long Beach, California	USA	WASC-ACCJC	B,M		ABET	MS				
California State University, Northridge	Northridge, California	USA	WASC-ACCJC	B,M		ABET					
California State University, Sacramento	Sacramento, California	USA	WASC-ACCJC	B,M		ABET					
California State University, San Bernardino	San Bernardino, California	USA	WASC-ACCJC	B,M		ABET					
California University of Pennsylvania	California, Pennsylvania	USA	MSACHE	Master's I		ABET					
University of California, Berkeley	Berkeley, California	USA	WASC-ACCJC	B,M,D(98)	RU/VH	ABET	MS	PhD	1968		
University of California, Davis	Davis, California	USA	WASC-ACCJC	B,M,D(60)	RU/VH	ABET	MS	PhD			
University of California, Irvine	Irvine, California	USA	WASC-ACCJC	B,M,D(39)	RU/VH		MS	PhD			
University of California, Los Angeles	Los Angeles, California	USA	WASC-ACCJC	B,M,D(78)	RU/VH	ABET	MS	PhD			
University of California, Merced	Merced, California	USA	WASC-ACCJC	Candidate	n/a		MS	PhD			
University of California, Riverside	Riverside, California	USA	WASC-ACCJC	B,M,D(98)	RU/VH	ABET	MS	PhD			
University of California, San Diego	San Diego, California	USA	WASC-ACCJC	B,M,D(87)	RU/VH		MS	PhD			
University of California, Santa Barbara	Santa Barbara, California	USA	WASC-ACCJC	B,M,D(40)	RU/VH	ABET	MS	PhD			
University of California, Santa Cruz	Santa Cruz, California	USA	WASC-ACCJC	B,M,D(25)	RU/VH		MS	PhD			
Calvin University	Grand Rapids, Michigan	USA	NCAHLC	B,M		ABET					
Carnegie Mellon University	Pittsburgh, Pennsylvania	USA	MSACHE	Doctoral/Research-Extensive	RU/VH		MS	PhD			
Case Western Reserve University	Cleveland, Ohio	USA	NCAHLC	B,M,D	RU/VH	ABET	MS	PhD			
Central Connecticut State University	New Britain, Connecticut	USA	NEASC-CIHE	A,B,M,D		ABET	none	none			
University of Central Florida	Orlando, Florida	USA	SACS-COC	Doctoral/4 or more	RU/H	ABET	MS	PhD			
College of Charleston	Charleston, South Carolina	USA	SACS-COC	Master's I		ABET					
University of Chicago	Chicago, Illinois	USA	NCAHLC	B,M,D	RU/VH		MS	PhD			
CIMAT	Guanajuato, Guanajuato	Mexico					MS	PhD			
University of Cincinnati	Cincinnati, Ohio	USA	NCAHLC	A,B,M,D	RU/VH	ABET	MS	PhD			
Clemson University	Clemson, South Carolina	USA	SACS-COC	Doctoral/4 or more	RU/H	ABET	MS	PhD			
Coastal Carolina University	Conway, South Carolina	USA	SACS-COC	Master's I		ABET					
Columbia University	New York, New York	USA	MSACHE	Doctoral/Research-Extensive	RU/VH		MS	PhD			
Colorado State University	Fort Collins, Colorado	USA	NCAHLC	B,M,D	RU/VH		MEng	PhD			
University of Colorado at Boulder	Boulder, Colorado	USA	NCAHLC	B,M,D	RU/VH		MEng	PhD			
University of Colorado at Colorado Springs	Colorado Springs, Colorado	USA	NCAHLC	B,M,D	Master's L	ABET	MS	PhD			
University of Colorado at Denver	Denver, Colorado	USA	NCAHLC	B,M,D	RU/VH	ABET	MS	PhD			
University of Connecticut	Storrs, Connecticut	USA	NEASC-CIHE	B,M,D	RU/VH	ABET	MS	PhD			
Concordia University	Montreal, Quebec	Canada					MS	PhD			
Cornell University	Ithaca, New York	USA	MSACHE	Doctoral/Research-Extensive	RU/VH		MEng	PhD			
Dalhousie University	Halifax, Nova Scotia	Canada					MSc	PhD			
Dallas Baptist University	Dallas, Texas	USA	SACS-COC	B,M,D	Master's L		None	None			
Dartmouth College	Hanover, New Hampshire	USA	NEASC-CIHE	B,M,D	RU/VH		MS	PhD			
Dakota State University	Madison, South Dakota	USA	NCAHLC	A,B,M,D			MS	none			
University of Delaware	Newark, Delaware	USA		B,M,D		ABET	MS	PhD			
Drexel University	Philadelphia, Pennsylvania	USA	MSACHE	Doctoral/Research-Extensive	RU/H	ABET	MS	PhD			
Duke University	Durham, North Carolina	USA	SACS-COC	Doctoral/4 or more	RU/VH		MS	PhD			
East Tennessee State University	Johnson City, Tennessee	USA	SACS-COC	Doctoral/4 or more		ABET	MS	none			
Eastern Kentucky University	Richmond, Kentucky	USA	SACS-COC	Master's II		ABET					
Eastern Washington University	Cheney, Washington	USA	NWCCU	B,M,D		ABET	MS	none			
Elon University	Elon, North Carolina	USA	SACS	Masters 1							
University of Evansville	Evansville, Indiana	USA	NCAHLC	A,B,M,D		ABET	MS	none			
Fairleigh Dickinson University	Teaneck, New Jersey	USA	MSACHE	Master's I		ABET					
Flinders University	Adelaide, South Australia	Australia				ACS	MSc	PhD			
Florida A&M University	Tallahassee, Florida	USA	SACS-COC	Doctoral/4 or more		ABET	MS	none			
Florida Atlantic University	Boca Raton, Florida	USA	SACS-COC	Doctoral/4 or more	RU/H	ABET	MS	PhD			
Florida Institute of Technology	Melbourne, Florida	USA	SACS-COC	Doctoral/4 or more	RU/H	ABET	MS	PhD			
Florida International University	Miami, Florida	USA	SACS-COC	Doctoral/4 or more	RU/H	ABET	MS	PhD			
Florida State University	Tallahassee, Florida	USA	SACS-COC	Doctoral/4 or more	RU/VH	ABET	MS	PhD			
University of Florida	Gainesville, Florida	USA	SACS-COC	Doctoral/4 or more	RU/VH		MS	PhD			
Gannon University	Erie, Pennsylvania	USA	MSACHE	n/a		ABET					
George Mason University	Fairfax, Virginia	USA	SACS-COC	Doctoral/4 or more	RU/H	ABET	MS	PhD			
George Washington University	Washington, D.C.	USA	MSACHE	Doctoral/Research-Extensive	RU/H	ABET	MS	DSc			
Georgia Institute of Technology	Atlanta, Georgia	USA	SACS-COC	Doctoral/4 or more	RU/VH	ABET	MS	PhD			
Georgia Southern University	Statesboro, Georgia	USA	SACS-COC	Doctoral/3 or fewer		ABET	none	none			
Governors State University	University Park, Illinois	USA	NCAHLC	B,M,D		none known	none	none			
Grambling State University	Grambling, Louisiana	USA	SACS-COC	Doctoral/3 or fewer		ABET	none	none			
Hampton University	Hampton, Virginia	USA	SACS-COC	Doctoral/3 or fewer		ABET	none	none			
Harvard University	Cambridge, Massachusetts	USA	NEASC-CIHE	A,B,M,D	RU/VH		MS	PhD		1978	Harvard Computation Center; Statistical Laboratory;
Harvey Mudd College	Claremont, California	USA	WASC-ACCJC	B		none known	none	none			
Henderson State University	Arkadelphia, Arkansas	USA	COPLAC	B	Master's M						
Hofstra University	Hempstead, New York	USA					MS	none			
University of Houston	Houston, Texas	USA	SACS-COC	Doctoral/4 or more	RU/H	ABET	MS	PhD			
University of Houston–Clear Lake	Houston, Texas	USA	SACS-COC	Doctoral/3 or fewer		ABET	MS	none			
Howard University	Washington, D.C.	USA	MSACHE	Doctoral/Research-Extensive		ABET	MS	none			
University of Hull	Hull, Yorkshire	United Kingdom				British Computer Society	MSc	PhD			
Idaho State University	Pocatello, Idaho	USA	NWCCU	A,B,M,D	DRU	ABET	MS	PhD			
University of Idaho	Moscow, Idaho	USA	NWCCU	B,M,D	RU/H	ABET	MS	PhD			
University of Illinois	Urbana, Illinois	USA	NCAHLC	B,M,D	RU/VH	ABET	MS	PhD			
University of Illinois at Chicago	Chicago, Illinois	USA	NCAHLC	B,M,D	RU/VH	ABET	MS	PhD			
Illinois Institute of Technology	Chicago, Illinois	USA	NCAHLC	B,M,D	RU/H	ABET	MS	PhD			
Illinois State University	Normal, Illinois	USA	NCAHLC	B,M,D		ABET	none	none			
Indiana University	Bloomington, Indiana	USA	NCAHLC	A,B,M,D	RU/VH		MS	PhD			
Indiana University – Purdue University Indianapolis	Indianapolis, Indiana	USA	NCAHLC	A,B,M		ABET					
Iona University	New Rochelle, New York	USA	MSACHE	Master's I		ABET					
Iowa State University	Ames, Iowa	USA	NCAHLC	B,M,D	RU/VH	ABET	MS	PhD			
University of Iowa	Iowa City, Iowa	USA	NCAHLC	B,M,D	RU/VH		MS	PhD			
İstanbul Bilgi University	Istanbul	Turkey									
Jackson State University	Jackson, Mississippi	USA	SACS-COC	Doctoral/4 or more		ABET	MS	none			
Jacksonville State University	Jacksonville, Alabama	USA	SACS-COC	Master's II		ABET					
James Madison University	Harrisonburg, Virginia	USA	SACS-COC	B,M			MS				
Johns Hopkins University	Baltimore, Maryland	USA	MSACHE	Doctoral/Research-Extensive	RU/VH	ABET	MS	PhD			
Kansas State University	Manhattan, Kansas	USA	NCAHLC	A,B,M,D	RU/VH	ABET	MS	PhD			
University of Kansas	Lawrence, Kansas	USA	NCAHLC	B,M,D	RU/VH	ABET	MS	PhD			
Kennesaw State University	Kennesaw, Georgia	USA	SACS-COC	Doctoral/3 or fewer		ABET	MS	none			
Kent State University	Kent, Ohio	USA	NCAHLC	A,B,M,D	RU/H		MS	PhD			
University of Kentucky	Lexington, Kentucky	USA	SACS-COC	Doctoral/4 or more	RU/VH	ABET	MS	PhD			
Lafayette College	Easton, Pennsylvania	USA	MSACHE	Baccalaureate-Liberal Arts		ABET					
Lamar University	Beaumont, Texas	USA	SACS-COC	Doctoral/4 or more	Master's L	ABET	MS	PhD			
Lehigh University	Bethlehem, Pennsylvania	USA	MSACHE	Doctoral/Research-Extensive	RU/H	ABET	MS	PhD			
University of Louisiana at Lafayette	Lafayette, Louisiana	USA	SACS-COC	Doctoral/4 or more	RU/H	ABET	MS	PhD			
University of Louisiana at Monroe	Monroe, Louisiana	USA	SACS-COC	Doctoral/4 or more		ABET	none	none			
Louisiana State University	Baton Rouge, Louisiana	USA	SACS-COC	Doctoral/4 or more	RU/VH		MS	PhD			
Louisiana State University, Shreveport	Shreveport, Louisiana	USA	SACS-COC	Master's II		ABET					
Louisiana Tech University	Ruston, Louisiana	USA	SACS-COC	Doctoral/4 or more		ABET	MS	none			
University of Louisville	Louisville, Kentucky	USA	SACS-COC	Doctoral/4 or more	RU/H	ABET	MS/MEng	PhD			
Loyola University Maryland	Baltimore, Maryland	USA	MSACHE	Master's I		ABET					
LSU New Orleans	New Orleans, Louisiana	USA	SACS-COC	Doctoral/4 or more	RU/H	ABET	MS	PhD			
University of Maine	Orono, Maine	USA	NEASC-CIHE	A,B,M,D	RU/H	ABET	MS	PhD			
University of Maryland	College Park, Maryland	USA	MSACHE	Doctoral/Research-Extensive	RU/VH		MS	PhD			
University of Maryland, Baltimore County	Baltimore, Maryland	USA	MSACHE	Doctoral/Research-Extensive	RU/H	ABET	MS	PhD			
University of Massachusetts Amherst	Amherst, Massachusetts	USA	NEASC-CIHE	A,B,M,D	RU/VH		MS	PhD			
University of Massachusetts Boston	Boston, Massachusetts	USA	NEASC-CIHE	B,M,D	DRU	ABET	MS	PhD			
University of Massachusetts Dartmouth	North Dartmouth, Massachusetts	USA	NEASC-CIHE	B,M,D		ABET	MS	none			
University of Massachusetts Lowell	Lowell, Massachusetts	USA	NEASC-CIHE	A,B,M,D	DRU	ABET	MS	ScD			
Massachusetts Institute of Technology	Cambridge, Massachusetts	USA	NEASC-CIHE	B,M,D	RU/VH	ABET	MS/MEng	PhD/ScD	1975		
Maynooth University	Maynooth	Ireland	CPD	Bsc,PHD			MS	PHD			
McGill University	Montreal, Quebec	Canada		B,M,D	RU/VH		MSc	PhD			
McMaster University	Hamilton, Ontario	Canada		B,M,D							
McNeese State University	Lake Charles, Louisiana	USA	SACS-COC	Master's II		ABET					
Mercer University	Macon, Georgia	USA	SACS-COC	Doctoral/4 or more		ABET	none	none			
Metropolitan State University of Denver	Denver, Colorado	USA	NCAHLC	B		ABET					
Miami University	Oxford, Ohio	USA	NCAHLC	A,B,M,D		ABET	MS	none			
Michigan State University	East Lansing, Michigan	USA	NCAHLC	B,M,D	RU/VH		MS	PhD			
University of Michigan	Ann Arbor, Michigan	USA	NCAHLC	B,M,D	RU/VH	ABET	MS	PhD			
University of Michigan–Dearborn	Dearborn, Michigan	USA	NCAHLC	B,M		ABET					
Michigan Technological University	Houghton, Michigan	USA					MS	PhD			
Middle Tennessee State University	Murfreesboro, Tennessee	USA	SACS-COC	Doctoral/4 or more		ABET	MS	none			
Millersville University of Pennsylvania	Millersville, Pennsylvania	USA	MSACHE	n/a		ABET					
University of Minnesota	Minneapolis and Saint Paul, Minnesota	USA	NCAHLC	B,M,D	RU/VH		MS	PhD			
University of Minnesota Duluth	Duluth, Minnesota	USA	NCAHLC	B,M,D		ABET	MS	none			
University of Mississippi	University, Mississippi	USA	SACS-COC	Doctoral/4 or more	RU/H	ABET	MS	PhD			
Mississippi State University	Mississippi State, Mississippi	USA	SACS-COC	Doctoral/4 or more	RU/H	ABET	MS	PhD			
Mississippi Valley State University	Itta Bena, Mississippi	USA	SACS-COC	Master's I		ABET					
University of Missouri	Columbia, Missouri	USA	NCAHLC	B,M,D	RU/H	ABET	MS	PhD			
Missouri State University	Springfield, Missouri	USA	NCAHLC	B,M,D		ABET	none	none			
Missouri University of Science and Technology	Rolla, Missouri	USA	NCAHLC	B,M,D	RU/H	ABET	MS	PhD			
Modern Academy In Maadi	Cairo	Egypt	MSACHE	Master's I		ABET	MS	none			
University of Montana	Missoula, Montana	USA	NWCCU	A,B,M,D		ABET	MS	none			
Montana State University	Bozeman, Montana	USA	NWCCU	B,M,D	RU/VH	ABET	MS	PhD			
Montana Tech of The University of Montana	Butte, Montana	USA	NWCCU	A,B,M		ABET					
Montclair State University	Upper Montclair, New Jersey	USA	MSACHE	Master's I		ABET					
Monterrey Institute of Technology	Monterrey, Nuevo León	Mexico					MS	PhD			
National Autonomous University of Mexico	Mexico City	Mexico					MS	PhD			
National Dong Hwa University	Hualien	Taiwan		B,M,D		IET	MS	PhD			
National Polytechnic Institute	Mexico City	Mexico					MS	PhD			
Naval Postgraduate School	Monterey, California	USA	WASC-ACCJC	M,D(14)	Master's L		MS	PhD			
University of Nebraska	Lincoln, Nebraska	USA	NCAHLC	A,B,M,D	RU/VH	ABET	MS	PhD			
University of Nebraska Omaha	Omaha, Nebraska	USA	NCAHLC	B,M,D		ABET	MS	none			
University of Nevada	Reno, Nevada	USA	NWCCU	A,B,M,D	RU/H	ABET	MS	PhD			
University of Nevada, Las Vegas	Las Vegas, Nevada	USA	NWCCU	A,B,M,D	RU/H	ABET	MS	PhD			
University of New Hampshire	Durham, New Hampshire	USA	NEASC-CIHE	A,B,M,D	RU/H	ABET	MS	PhD			
University of New Haven	West Haven, Connecticut	USA	NEASC-CIHE	A,B,M,D		ABET	MS	none			
The College of New Jersey	Ewing, New Jersey	USA	MSACHE	Master's I		ABET					
New Jersey Institute of Technology	Newark, New Jersey	USA	MSACHE	Doctoral/Research-Extensive	RU/H	ABET	MS	PhD			
University of New Mexico	Albuquerque, New Mexico	USA	NCAHLC	A,B,M,D	RU/VH	ABET	MS	PhD			
New Mexico Institute of Mining and Technology	Socorro, New Mexico	USA	NCAHLC	A,B,M,D	Master's M		MS	PhD			
New Mexico State University	Las Cruces, New Mexico	USA	NCAHLC	A,B,M,D	RU/H		MS	PhD			
University of New South Wales	Sydney, New South Wales	Australia	Minister for School Education, Early Childhood and Youth	Bachelor, Masters, PhD		Australian Computer Society, Engineers Australia	MIT	PhD			
State University of New York at Binghamton	Binghamton, New York	USA	MSACHE	Doctoral/Research-Extensive	RU/H	ABET	MS	PhD			
State University of New York at Brockport	Brockport, New York	USA	MSACHE	Master's II		ABET					
State University of New York at Buffalo	Buffalo, New York	USA	MSACHE	Master's I			MS	PhD			
State University of New York at New Paltz	New Paltz, New York	USA	MSACHE	Master's I		ABET					
State University of New York at Stony Brook	Stony Brook, New York	USA	MSACHE	Doctoral/Research-Extensive	RU/VH	ABET	MS	PhD			
City College of New York	New York, New York	USA	MSACHE	Master's I		ABET					
City University of New York	Staten Island, New York	USA	MSACHE	Master's I		ABET					
New York University	New York	USA	MSACHE	Doctoral/Research-Extensive	RU/VH		MS	PhD			
Nicholls State University	Thibodaux, Louisiana	USA	SACS-COC	Master's II		ABET					
Norfolk State University	Norfolk, Virginia	USA	SACS-COC	Doctoral/3 or fewer	Master's L	ABET	MS	PhD			
North Carolina Agricultural and Technical State University	Greensboro, North Carolina	USA	SACS-COC	Doctoral/3 or fewer		ABET	MS	none			
University of North Carolina	Chapel Hill, North Carolina	USA	SACS-COC	Doctoral/4 or more	RU/VH		MS	PhD			
University of North Carolina at Greensboro	Greensboro, North Carolina	USA	SACS-COC	Doctoral/4 or more		ABET	MS	none			
North Carolina State University	Raleigh, North Carolina	USA	SACS-COC	Doctoral/4 or more	RU/VH	ABET	MS	PhD			
University of North Dakota	Grand Forks, North Dakota	USA	NCAHLC	B,M,D		ABET	MS	none			
North Dakota State University	Fargo, North Dakota	USA	NCAHLC	B,M,D	RU/H	ABET	MS	PhD			
University of North Florida	Jacksonville, Florida	USA	SACS-COC	Doctoral/3 or fewer		ABET	MS	none			
University of North Texas	Denton, Texas	USA	SACS-COC	Doctoral/4 or more		ABET	none	none			
Northeastern University	Boston, Massachusetts	USA	NEASC-CIHE	A,B,M,D	RU/H	ABET	MS	PhD			
Northeastern Illinois University	Chicago, Illinois	USA	NCAHLC	B,M		none known	MS	none			
Northern Arizona University	Flagstaff, Arizona	USA	NCAHLC	B,M,D		ABET	MS	none			
Northern Illinois University	DeKalb, Illinois	USA	NCAHLC	B,M,D		none known	MS	none			
Northern Kentucky University	Highland Heights, Kentucky	USA	SACS-COC	B,M	Master's L		MS				
Northwestern University	Evanston, Illinois	USA	NCAHLC	B,M,D	RU/VH		MS	PhD			
University of Notre Dame	Notre Dame, Indiana	USA	NCAHLC	B,M,D	RU/VH	ABET	MS	PhD			
Oakland University	Rochester, Michigan	USA	NCAHLC	B,M,D	DRU	ABET	MS	PhD			
Ohio State University	Columbus, Ohio	USA	NCAHLC	A,B,M,D	RU/VH	ABET	MS	PhD			
Ohio University	Athens, Ohio	USA	NCAHLC	A,B,M,D		ABET	MS	none			
Oklahoma State University	Stillwater, Oklahoma	USA	NCAHLC	B,M,D	RU/H		MS	PhD			
University of Oklahoma	Norman, Oklahoma	USA	NCAHLC	B,M,D	RU/H	ABET	MS	PhD			
Old Dominion University	Norfolk, Virginia	USA	SACS-COC	Doctoral/4 or more	RU/H		MS	PhD			
Oregon Health & Science University	Hillsboro, Oregon	USA	NWCCU	A,B,M,D	Spec/Med	n/a	MS	PhD			
Oregon State University	Corvallis, Oregon	USA	NWCCU	B,M,D	RU/VH	ABET	MS	PhD			
University of Oregon	Eugene, Oregon	USA	NWCCU	B,M,D	RU/H		MS	PhD			
Pace University	New York	USA	MSACHE	Doctoral/Research-Extensive	DRU	ABET	MS	DPS			
Pacific Lutheran University	Tacoma, Washington	USA	NWCCU	B,M		ABET					
University of the Pacific	Stockton, California	USA	WASC-ACCJC	B,M,D(5)		ABET	none	none			
Pennsylvania State University	University Park, Pennsylvania	USA	MSACHE	Doctoral/Research-Extensive	RU/VH		MS/Meng	PhD			
University of Pennsylvania	Philadelphia, Pennsylvania	USA	MSACHE	Doctoral/Research-Extensive	RU/VH	ABET	MS	PhD			
University of Pittsburgh	Pittsburgh, Pennsylvania	USA	MSACHE	Doctoral/Research-Extensive	RU/VH		MS	PhD			
Plymouth State University	Plymouth, New Hampshire	USA	NEASC-CIHE	A,B,M		ABET					
Polytechnic Institute of New York University	Brooklyn, New York	USA	MSACHE	Doctoral/Research-Extensive	RU/H	ABET	MS	PhD			
Portland State University	Portland, Oregon	USA	NWCCU	B,M,D	DRU	ABET	MS	PhD			
University of Portland	Portland, Oregon	USA	NWCCU	B,M		ABET					
Prairie View A&M University	Prairie View, Texas	USA	SACS-COC	Doctoral/3 or fewer		ABET	MS	none			
Princeton University	Princeton, New Jersey	USA	MSACHE	Doctoral/Research-Extensive	RU/VH		none	PhD			
Purdue University	West Lafayette, Indiana	USA	NCAHLC	A,B,M,D	RU/VH		MS	PhD	1962		
Radboud University	Nijmegen	The Netherlands	NVAO	B,M,D		NVAO	MSc	PhD			
Radford University	Radford, Virginia	USA	SACS-COC	Master's II		ABET					
Randolph-Macon College	Ashland, Virginia	USA		BA/BS							
University of Reading	Reading, Berkshire	United Kingdom				British Computer Society	MSc	PhD			
Regis University	Denver, Colorado	USA	NCAHLC	B,M	Master's L	ABET	MS				
Rensselaer Polytechnic Institute	Troy, New York	USA	MSACHE	Doctoral/Research-Extensive	RU/VH		MS	PhD			
Rice University	Houston, Texas	USA	SACS-COC	Doctoral/4 or more	RU/VH		MS	PhD			
University of Rijeka	Rijeka	Croatia					MSc				
RMIT University	Melbourne, Victoria	Australia				Australian Computer Society	MCompSc	PhD			
Robert Morris University	Moon Township, Pennsylvania	USA	MSACHE	Master's I		ABET					
Rochester Institute of Technology	Rochester, New York	USA	MSACHE	Master's I		ABET					
University of Rochester	Rochester, New York	USA	MSACHE	Doctoral/Research-Extensive	RU/VH		none	PhD			
Rowan University	Glassboro, New Jersey	USA	MSACHE	n/a		ABET					
Rutgers University	New Brunswick, New Jersey	USA	MSACHE	Doctoral/Research-Extensive	RU/VH		MS	PhD			
Salem State University	Salem, Massachusetts	USA	NEASC-CIHE	B,M		ABET					
San Diego State University	San Diego, California	USA	WASC-ACCJC	B,M		ABET					
San Francisco State University	San Francisco, California	USA	WASC-ACCJC	B,M		ABET					
San Jose State University	San Jose, California	USA	WASC-ACCJC	B,M		ABET					
Santa Clara University	Santa Clara, California	USA	WASC-ACCJC	B,M,D(3)			none	none			
University of Scranton	Scranton, Pennsylvania	USA	MSACHE	n/a		ABET					
Shippensburg University	Shippensburg, Pennsylvania	USA	MSACHE	Master's I		ABET					
Slippery Rock University	Slippery Rock, Pennsylvania	USA	MSACHE	Doctoral/Research-Extensive		ABET	none	none			
University of South Alabama	Mobile, Alabama	USA	SACS-COC	Doctoral/4 or more		ABET	MS	PhD			
South Carolina State University	Orangeburg, South Carolina	USA	SACS-COC	Doctoral/3 or fewer		ABET	none	none			
University of South Carolina	Columbia, South Carolina	USA	SACS-COC	Doctoral/4 or more	RU/VH	ABET	MS	PhD			
University of South Carolina Upstate	Spartanburg, South Carolina	USA	SACS-COC	Master's I		ABET					
South Dakota School of Mines and Technology	Rapid City, South Dakota	USA	NCAHLC	A,B,M,D		ABET	MS	none			
South Dakota State University	Brookings, South Dakota	USA	NCAHLC	A,B,M,D		none known	MS	none			
University of South Dakota	Vermillion, South Dakota	USA	NCAHLC	A,B,M,D	DRU	none known	MA	PhD			
University of South Florida	Tampa, Florida	USA	SACS-COC	Doctoral/4 or more	RU/VH	ABET	MS	PhD			
Southeastern Louisiana University	Hammond, Louisiana	USA	SACS-COC	Doctoral/3 or fewer		ABET	none	none			
University of Southern California	Los Angeles, California	USA	WASC-ACCJC	B,M,D(115)	RU/VH	ABET	MS	PhD			
Southern Connecticut State University	New Haven, Connecticut	USA	NEASC-CIHE	A,B,M,D		ABET	none	none			
Southern Illinois University	Carbondale, Illinois	USA	NCAHLC	B,M,D	RU/H	none known	MS	PhD			
Southern Illinois University Edwardsville	Edwardsville, Illinois	USA	NCAHLC	B,M		ABET	MS	none			
University of Southern Maine	Portland, Maine	USA	NEASC-CIHE	A,B,M,D		ABET	MS	none			
Southern Methodist University	Dallas, Texas	USA	SACS-COC	Doctoral/4 or more	DRU	ABET	MS	PhD			
University of Southern Mississippi	Hattiesburg, Mississippi	USA	SACS-COC	Doctoral/4 or more	RU/H	ABET	MS	PhD			
Southern New Hampshire University	Manchester, New Hampshire	USA	NECHE	Doctoral							
Southern Polytechnic State University	Marietta, Georgia	USA	SACS-COC	Master's I		ABET	MS				
Southern University	Baton Rouge, Louisiana	USA	SACS-COC	Doctoral/3 or fewer		ABET	MS	none			
St. Cloud State University	St. Cloud, Minnesota	USA	NCAHLC	A,B,M		ABET					
Stanford University	Palo Alto, California	USA	WASC-ACCJC	B,M,D(76)	RU/VH		MS	PhD	1965	George Forsythe	
Stephen F. Austin State University	Nacogdoches, Texas	USA	SACS-COC	Doctoral/3 or fewer	Master's L	ABET	MS	PhD			
Stevens Institute of Technology	Hoboken, New Jersey	USA	MSACHE	Doctoral/Research-Extensive	RU/H	ABET	MS	PhD			
Sunway University	Selangor	Malaysia	MQA	B,M		MQA	MSc				
Swansea University	Swansea, Wales	United Kingdom				British Computer Society	MSc/MRes/MPhil	PhD			
Syracuse University	Syracuse, New York	USA	MSACHE	Doctoral/Research-Extensive	RU/H	ABET	MS	PhD			
Taylor University	Upland, Indiana	USA	MSACHE	B,M		ABET					
Temple University	Philadelphia, Pennsylvania	USA	MSACHE	Doctoral/Research-Extensive	RU/H	ABET	MS	PhD			
Tennessee Technological University	Cookeville, Tennessee	USA		B,M		ABET	MS	none			
University of Tennessee	Chattanooga, Tennessee	USA	SACS-COC	Doctoral/4 or more		ABET	MS	none			
Texas A&M University	College Station, Texas	USA	SACS-COC	Doctoral/4 or more	RU/VH	ABET	MS	PhD			
University of Texas at Arlington	Arlington, Texas	USA	SACS-COC	Doctoral/4 or more	RU/H	ABET	MS	PhD			
University of Texas at Austin	Austin, Texas	USA	SACS-COC	Doctoral/4 or more	RU/VH	ABET	MA/MS	PhD			
University of Texas at Dallas	Dallas, Texas	USA	SACS-COC	Doctoral/4 or more	RU/H	ABET	MS	PhD			
University of Texas at El Paso	El Paso, Texas	USA	SACS-COC	Doctoral/4 or more	RU/H	ABET	MS	PhD			
University of Texas Rio Grande Valley	Edinburg, Texas	USA	SACS-COC	Doctoral/3 or fewer		ABET	MS	none			
University of Texas at San Antonio	San Antonio, Texas	USA	SACS-COC	Doctoral/4 or more	RU/H	ABET	MS	PhD			
Texas Christian University	Fort Worth, Texas	USA	SACS-COC	Doctoral/4 or more		ABET	none	none			
Texas State University	San Marcos, Texas	USA	SACS-COC	Doctoral/4 or more		ABET	MS	none			
Texila American University	Georgetown	Guyana	ADL				Msc	PhD			
University of Toledo	Toledo, Ohio	USA	NCAHLC	A,B,M,D	RU/H	ABET	MS	PhD			
Towson University	Towson, Maryland	USA	MSACHE	n/a		ABET					
Tufts University	Medford, Massachusetts	USA	NEASC-CIHE	B,M,D	RU/VH	ABET	MS	PhD			
The University of Tulsa	Tulsa, Oklahoma	USA	NCAHLC	B,M,D	RU/H	ABET	MS	PhD			
Universiti Tunku Abdul Rahman	Perak	Malaysia	MQA	B,M,D		MQA	MSc	PhD			
Tunku Abdul Rahman University College	Kuala Lumpur	Malaysia	MQA	B		MQA					
United States Air Force Academy	Colorado	USA	NCAHLC	B		ABET					
United States Military Academy	West Point, New York	USA	MSACHE	Specialized		ABET					
United States Naval Academy	Annapolis, Maryland	USA	MSACHE	Baccalaureate-General		ABET					
University of Utah	Salt Lake City, Utah	USA	NWCCU	A,B,M,D	RU/VH	ABET	MS	PhD			
Utah State University	Logan, Utah	USA	NWCCU	A,B,M,D	RU/H	ABET	MS	PhD			
Utah Valley University	Orem, Utah	USA	NWCCU	A,B		ABET					
Vanderbilt University	Nashville, Tennessee	USA	SACS-COC	Doctoral/4 or more	RU/VH	ABET	MS	PhD			
Villanova University	Villanova, Pennsylvania	USA	MSACHE	Master's I		ABET					
Virginia Commonwealth University	Richmond, Virginia	USA	SACS-COC	Doctoral/4 or more	RU/H	ABET	MS	PhD			
Virginia Military Institute	Lexington, Virginia	USA	SACS-COC	Baccalaureate		ABET					
Virginia Polytechnic Institute and State University	Blacksburg, Virginia	USA	SACS-COC	Doctoral/4 or more	RU/VH	ABET	MS	PhD			
University of Virginia	Charlottesville, Virginia	USA	SACS-COC	Doctoral/4 or more	RU/VH	ABET	MS	PhD			
Wake Forest University	Winston-Salem, North Carolina	USA	SACS-COC	Doctoral/4 or more		none known	MS	none			
Washington State University	Pullman, Washington	USA	NWCCU	B,M,D	RU/VH	ABET	MS	PhD			
University of Washington	Seattle, Washington	USA	NWCCU	B,M,D	RU/VH	ABET	MS	PhD			
Washington University in St. Louis	St. Louis, Missouri	USA	NCAHLC	A,B,M,D	RU/VH	ABET	MS	PhD			
University of Waterloo	Waterloo, Ontario	Canada					MMath MHI	PhD			
Wayne State University	Detroit, Michigan	USA	NCAHLC	B,M,D	RU/VH		MA/MS	PhD			
University of West Georgia	Carrollton, Georgia	USA	SACS-COC	Doctoral/3 or fewer		ABET	MS	none			
Western Kentucky University	Bowling Green, Kentucky	USA	SACS-COC	Doctoral/3 or fewer		ABET	MS	none			
Western Michigan University	Kalamazoo, Michigan	USA	NCAHLC	B,M,D	RU/H	ABET	MS	PhD			
Western Washington University	Bellingham, Washington	USA	NWCCU	B,M		ABET					
University of Windsor	Windsor, Ontario	Canada					MS	PhD			
Winston-Salem State University	Winston-Salem, North Carolina	USA	SACS-COC	Master's I		ABET					
Winthrop University	Rock Hill, South Carolina	USA	SACS-COC	Master's II		ABET					
University of Wisconsin–Eau Claire	Eau Claire, Wisconsin	USA	NCAHLC	A,B,M		ABET					
University of Wisconsin–Madison	Madison, Wisconsin	USA	NCAHLC	B,M,D	RU/VH		MS	PhD			
University of Wisconsin–Oshkosh	Oshkosh, Wisconsin	USA	NCAHLC	A,B,M		ABET					
Worcester Polytechnic Institute	Worcester, Massachusetts	USA	NEASC-CIHE	B,M,D	DRU	ABET	MS	PhD			
Wright State University	Dayton, Ohio	USA	NCAHLC	A,B,M,D	RU/H	ABET	MS	PhD			
University of Wyoming	Laramie, Wyoming	USA	NCAHLC	B,M,D	RU/H	ABET	MS	PhD			
Yale University	New Haven, Connecticut	USA	NEASC-CIHE	B,M,D	RU/VH		MS	PhD			
Department of Computer Science, University of Manchester	Manchester	United Kingdom							1964	Tom Kilburn	Computing Machine Laboratory, 1946. Computer Group, Department of Electrical Engineering.
Department of Computer Science and Technology, University of Cambridge	Cambridge	United Kingdom							1937	John Lennard-Jones	Mathematical Laboratory, 1937. Renamed to Computer Laboratory, 1970. Current name 2017
Ulster University Faculty of Computing and Engineering	Newtownabbey, Northern Ireland	United Kingdom							2001		School of Computing and Mathematics
School of Computer Science and Electronic Engineering, Essex University	Colchester, Essex	United Kingdom							1966		Electronic Systems Engineering (1966-2007), Department of Computer Science (1966-2007)
Department of Computer Science, University of Bristol	Bristol	United Kingdom							1984		Computer Science group, Mathematics Department, 1968.
School of Informatics, University of Edinburgh	Edinburgh	United Kingdom							1966	Sidney Michaelson	1960s: Computer Unit. 1966 - 1998 as Department of Computer Science.
Department of Computing, Imperial College London	Queen's Gate, London	United Kingdom							1964	Stanley Gill	1964-1966: Computer Unit. 1966-1970: Computing and Automation. 1970-1979: Computing and Control.
Department of Computer Science, University of Oxford	Oxford	United Kingdom							1957	Leslie Fox	1957-2011: Oxford University Computing Laboratory
