= CASL =

CASL may refer to:

- Canadian Association for School Libraries
- Canada's Anti-Spam Legislation
- Capital Area Soccer League
- Center for Advanced Study of Language
- China Aircraft Services Limited
- Club Atletico San Lorenzo
- Commercial Aircraft Sales and Leasing
- Committee of American Steamship Lines
- Common Algebraic Specification Language
- Compact Application Solution Language
- Complex and Adaptive Systems Laboratory
- Consortium for the Advanced Simulation of Light Water Reactors
