= Joanne Rycroft-Malone =

British researcher and academic

Joanne Rycroft-Malone OBE
- Born: 1965 (age 60–61); Normanton on Trent, England, UK
- Education: University of Southampton
- Scientific career
- Workplaces: Bangor University; Lancaster University
- Thesis: Patient participation in nurse-patient interactions about medication (2002)

Joanne Rycroft-Malone OBE is a British researcher who is a Distinguished Professor and the Executive Dean of the Faculty of Health and Medicine at Lancaster University. She is Programme Director and Chair of the Health and Social Care Delivery Research programme.

== Early life and education ==
Rycroft-Malone was born in Normanton on Trent. Her parents are from Yorkshire. She has said that as a child she wanted to be a nurse, a pilot and a historian. She trained as a nurse in London, and worked briefly in the pharmaceutical industry. She eventually graduated with degrees in nursing, psychology and occupational psychology. She earned her doctorate at the University of Southampton, where she researched the involvement of patients in discussions about medication.

== Research and career ==
Rycroft-Malone is an expert in mixed methods applied health research. She has studied evidenced-based medicine and nursing. She was appointed to Bangor University in 2006, where she was made a Professor of Health Services. In 2014, she was appointed to the Betsi Cadwaladr University Health Board.

In 2019, Rycroft-Malone joined Lancaster University as Executive Dean. At Lancaster, she oversaw the development of the Health Innovation Campus. She serves on the Medical Schools Council and Chairs the National Institute for Health and Care Excellence (NICE) Implementation Strategy Group.

== Selected publications ==
- Jo Rycroft-Malone; Kate Seers; Angie Titchen; Gillian Harvey; Alison Kitson; Brendan McCormack (1 July 2004). "What counts as evidence in evidence-based practice?". Journal of Advanced Nursing. 47 (1): 81–90. doi:10.1111/j.1365-2648.2004.03068.x. ISSN 1365-2648. PMID 15186471. Wikidata Q80178094.
- Alison L Kitson; Jo Rycroft-Malone; Gill Harvey; Brendan McCormack; Kate Seers; Angie Titchen (7 January 2008). "Evaluating the successful implementation of evidence into practice using the PARiHS framework: theoretical and practical challenges". Implementation Science. 3: 1. doi:10.1186/1748-5908-3-1. ISSN 1748-5908. PMC 2235887. PMID 18179688. Wikidata Q38514627.
- Jo Rycroft-Malone (1 October 2004). "The PARIHS framework--a framework for guiding the implementation of evidence-based practice". Journal of Nursing Care Quality. 19 (4): 297–304. doi:10.1097/00001786-200410000-00002. ISSN 1057-3631. PMID 15535533. Wikidata Q35944585.
