= City University Qatar =

Coordinates: 25.42833°N 51.4890°E

- جامعة سيتي يونيفرسيتي قطر
- Motto: We Build Careers
- Type: Private
- Established: 2018; 8 years ago
- Parent institution: Artan Consulting and Educational Services (ACES)
- Accreditation: Ministry of Education and Higher Education
- President: Faris Gorashi Faris
- Location: Building No. 39, Street 255, Zone 69, Erkiyah, 200197, Lusail, Qatar
- Campus: 11,500 m^{2} (124,000 sq ft); Urban
- Language: English, Arabic
- Website: https://cuq-ulster.edu.qa

City University Qatar (CUQ), also known as CUQ Ulster University, is a private university based in Lusail, Qatar. Established in 2018 as City University College (CUC), its undergraduate and postgraduate degrees are awarded by Ulster University. CUQ is licensed by Qatar's Ministry of Education and Higher Education.

== History ==
City University Qatar was established in Doha in 2018 as City College. During its early years, the institution operated from leased premises in Doha's West Bay district, initially at the Excellence Tower and later using the Palm Towers as a postgraduate centre.

On 30 August 2019, the college was formally designated an Affiliate College of Ulster University. Franchised programmes began the following month. Initially it offered a BSc (Hons) in Business Studies awarded by Ulster University and a Diploma in International Foundation Studies. Postgraduate programmes were added later. Following the agreement, bachelor's and master's degrees delivered at the college became Ulster University awards. The institution subsequently adopted the names CUC Ulster University and later CUQ Ulster University.

In October 2022, a groundbreaking ceremony for the university's purpose-built campus in Erkiyah, Lusail was held, which was hosted by then-Executive Dean Faris Gorashi Faris and attended by Ulster University Vice-Chancellor Paul Bartholomew.

In October 2025, the new campus was formally inaugurated by Noura Mohamed Al-Ansari of the Ministry of Education and Higher Education, Nasser Al-Naimi, CEO of Artan Holding & CUQ Board of Trustees member, and Paul Bartholomew of Ulster University.

== Campus ==
City University Qatar's main campus is at Building No. 39, Street 255, Zone 69, Erkiyah, Lusail, approximately 21 kilometres north of central Doha.

The main academic building has a gross floor area of 11,500 square metres and can accommodate up to 5,000 students. Facilities include specialist laboratories for biomedical engineering, architecture, and artificial intelligence; smart lecture theatres; a multi-floor library; a social courtyard; a sports hall; a gymnasium; a rooftop swimming pool; a padel court; and student lounges. The campus received a four-star rating under the Global Sustainability Assessment System.

City University Qatar Campus

== Organisation ==
=== Governance ===
City University Qatar is owned and operated by Artan Consulting and Educational Services (ACES), the higher and further education subsidiary of Artan Holding.

Faris Gorashi Faris has led the university since its founding, initially serving as Executive Dean before becoming president following the rename. Nasser Al-Naimi, CEO of Artan Holding & CUQ Board of Trustees member, chairs the university's governing council.

Through the academic partnership, Ulster University's Faculty of Arts, Humanities and Social Sciences and Ulster University Business School oversee curriculum, external examining, and validation for relevant degree programmes. Higher National Diploma programmes are awarded by Pearson under the BTEC framework.

=== Schools ===
The university organises its programmes into four schools:

- School of Business
- School of Engineering
- School of Arts and Humanities
- School of Foundation Studies

An International Foundation Programme provides a route into Business, Engineering, and Arts and Humanities programmes for students who require additional academic or language preparation. CUQ also offers an English Language Pathway through its British Council-accredited IELTS test centre.

The School of Business offers a BSc (Hons) in Business Studies and postgraduate programmes including full-time and part-time MBAs, an MBA in women in leadership, an MSc in marketing, and a master's degree in educational management.

The School of Engineering offers programmes in computer science, architecture, game design, and artificial intelligence.

The School of Arts and Humanities offers undergraduate programmes in law and psychology, as well as a Master of Laws in international commercial law.

== Research ==
In December 2025, CUQ established a Research and Innovation Centre at its Lusail campus to coordinate applied and interdisciplinary research and support collaboration with industry.

The centre includes laboratories for biomedical engineering, architecture, and artificial intelligence and supports research aligned with Qatar National Vision 2030.

== Accreditations ==
CUQ is licensed by Qatar's Ministry of Education and Higher Education. Its undergraduate and postgraduate degrees are awarded by Ulster University, while Higher National Diplomas are validated by Pearson under the BTEC framework.

The university hosts the Future Tech Innovation Challenge. Its campus includes an official IELTS test centre operated in partnership with the British Council.
