= Benburb =

Village in County Tyrone, Northern Ireland

Coordinates: 54.4119°N 6.7459°W

Benburb: Irish: Beann Bhorb
- Location within Northern Ireland
- Irish grid reference: H815522
  - Belfast: 43 miles
- District: Dungannon & South Tyrone
- County: County Tyrone
- Country: Northern Ireland
- Sovereign state: United Kingdom
- Post town: DUNGANNON
- Postcode district: BT71
- Dialling code: 028
- UK Parliament: Fermanagh & South Tyrone

Benburb (from Irish Beann Borb, meaning 'proud/prominent cliff')) is a village and townland in County Tyrone, Northern Ireland. It lies 7.5 miles from Armagh and 8 miles from Dungannon. The River Blackwater runs alongside the village as does the Ulster Canal.

== History ==
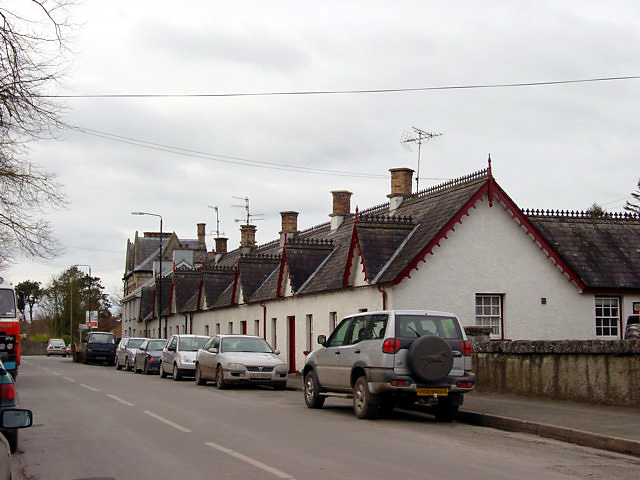
Benburb's Main Street

It is best known, in historical terms, for the Battle of Benburb that took place there in 1646. This was fought between the armies of Confederate Ireland led by Owen Roe O'Neill and the Scottish Covenanters led by Munro. The battle resulted in a crushing victory for O'Neill's men at the townland of Drumflugh around a mile outside the village. It was commemorated in the ballad "The Battle of Benburb".

Since the Battle of Benburb was a rare 17th-century Irish military victory, in 1890 new Irish nationalist dominated Corporation in Dublin city renamed Barrack Street in Dublin's north inner city after the battle. Benburb Street runs between Queen Street and Blackhall Place. There is also a Benburb Street in south Belfast just off the Donegall Road.

In later years Benburb became known for its linen production, as did many areas in Northern Ireland and later still for agriculture, most notably apple farming, and mushroom production.

Benburb was the home of the 17th century poet Maurice O'Dugan (fl.1660), who was reputed to have written the poems Gluas do chabhlach, Bhi Eoghan air buile, Faraoir chaill Eire a céile fircheart and the famous air The Coolin.

== Places of interest ==
The village is also home to the impressive Benburb Castle built in 1611 by Sir Richard Wingfield on the ruins of a military fortification constructed by Prince Shane O'Neill, circa 1558, at the base of a limestone cliff overlooking the River Blackwater, the border between County Tyrone and County Armagh. The castle is in excellent condition having been recently restored and stands in the grounds of the imposing Servite Priory, a religious order based in the village.

=== Benburb Priory ===
Wingfield was made Viscount Powerscourt in 1618 and the estate remained in the Wingfield family until sold in 1877 to Belfast distiller James Bruce, who died in 1917. It then went to his brother who sold it. The manor house passed through a number of owners before being requisitioned by the War Office as military hospital during World War II. From 1943 – 1944 the members of the British Army Medical Corp were stationed there, and from October 1943 to April 1944 it was the home to personnel of the American 7th Field Hospital. The hospital had 135 beds. The Servite Order acquired the property in 1947, initially for a seminary. In more recent years the Priory has been a cross-community centre supporting over 30 groups spanning culture and heritage, older people, St Peregrine cancer support, education and rehabilitation.

The Priory is also home to Benburb Priory Library and Museum which holds extensive collections of Servite and Marian books and artefacts, the Servite archives for Britain and Ireland, the Priory (formerly Wingfield/Powerscourt) estate and local history. The Library and Museum was established in 2016 (Professor Gerry McKenna MRIA; founding chair) and includes the extensive and valuable private collection of Hugo Ricciardi O'Neill, Chief of the Clans of O'Neill, who resides in Setubal, Portugal.

== Education ==
- Benburb Primary School
- Benburb Community Playgroup

== Demography ==
=== 19th century population ===
The population of the village decreased during the 19th century:

Year	1841	1851	1861	1871	1881	1891
Population	330	253	275	192	222	241
Houses	63	63	60	45	49	58

=== 21st century population ===
Benburb in the Northern Ireland UK Census in 2011 was classified as a Hamlet, with a population of 598 people.

- 8.9% were 18 or younger
- 11.7% were aged 60 and over
- 40.0% were male
- 60.0% were female
- 55.6% were from a Catholic background
- 25.4% were from a Protestant background
- 19.0% stated another Religion or had no religion

== Townland ==
The townland is situated in the historic barony of Dungannon Middle and the civil parish of Clonfeacle and covers an area of 185 acres.

The population of the townland declined during the 19th century:

Year	1841	1851	1861	1871	1881	1891
Population	64	58	-	56	121	35
Houses	12	12	-	13	24	10

The increase seen in the 1881 Census was ascribed mainly to the building of houses for millworkers.

== Notable people ==
- Conor McKenna (born 1996), Gaelic football and Australian rules football player
- Gerry McKenna (born 1953) – MRIA, biologist, Senior Vice President of the Royal Irish Academy, Vice Chancellor and President of University of Ulster
- John Orr (1858–1932), founder of the South African department store John Orr's

== See also ==
- Abbeys and priories in Northern Ireland (County Tyrone)
- List of villages in Northern Ireland
- List of townlands of County Tyrone
- Ulster Canal
