= Benburb Castle =

Castle in Northern Ireland

Coordinates: 54°24′30″N 6°44′42″W

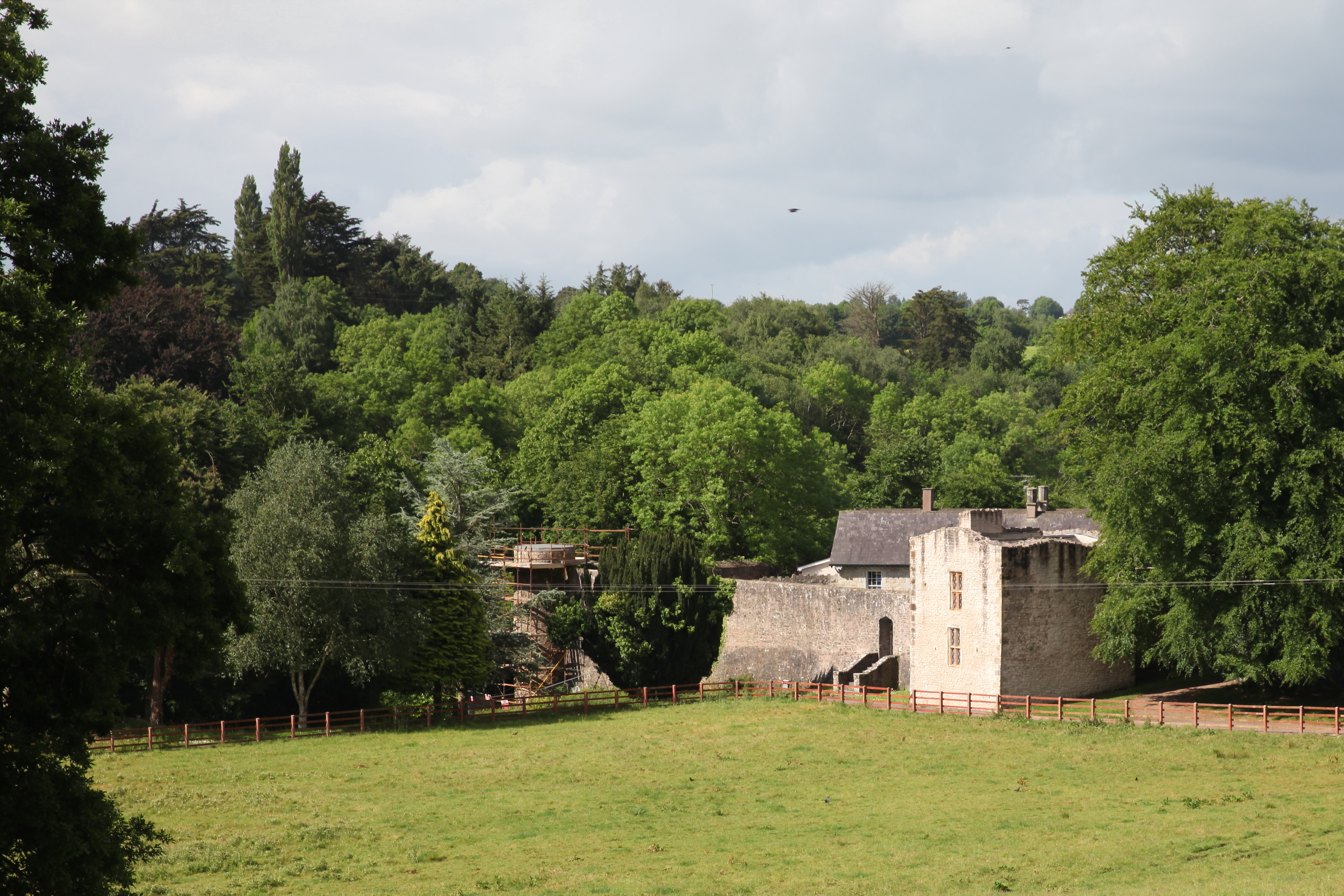
The Benburb Castle

Benburb Castle is a castle situated in Benburb, County Tyrone, Northern Ireland. It is built on a limestone cliff overlooking the River Blackwater, the border between County Tyrone and County Armagh. A 19th-century tower house occupies the south west area of the bawn. The castle has been restored and stands in the grounds of the imposing Servite Priory, the local base of that religious order.

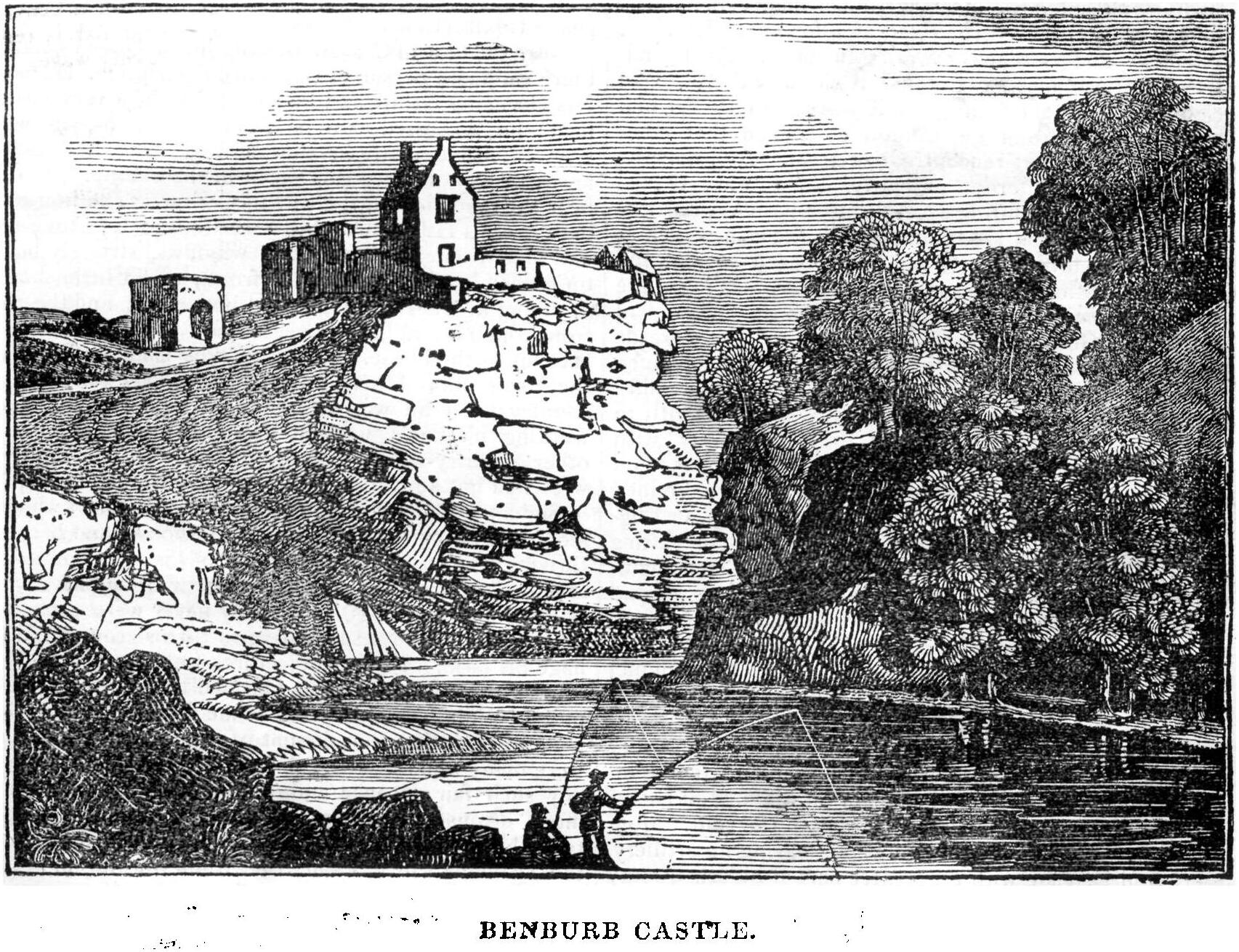
Benburb Castle, Dublin Penny Journal, 1834

Benburb or Wingfield's Castle is a State Care Historic Monument, in Dungannon and South Tyrone Borough Council area, at grid ref: H8146 5199.

== See also ==
- Castles in Northern Ireland
