= Colin Davidson (artist) =

Northern Irish visual artist (born 1968)

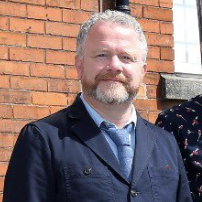

Chancellor of Ulster University
- Incumbent
- Assumed office June 2021
- Preceded by: James Nesbitt

Personal details
- Born: 1968 (age 57–58) Belfast, Northern Ireland
- Education: Ulster University (BA)

Colin Davidson (born 1968) is a Northern Irish visual artist, living and working near Belfast, Northern Ireland. An artist who works in themes, his recent large-scale head paintings have been exhibited worldwide. Since 2021, he has been Chancellor of Ulster University.

== Education ==
Davidson was born in Belfast in 1968 and attended Methodist College Belfast between 1980 and 1987. He graduated from the University of Ulster in 1991 with a first class honours degree in design. He worked in the field of design for print until 1999 when he started to paint full-time. Davidson is an academician of the Royal Ulster Academy and served as president of the Royal Ulster Academy between 2012 and 2015.

== Early work ==
Davidson started to paint Belfast in his teens, and this theme came to the fore in 2004 when his exhibition No Continuing City was mounted at the Tom Caldwell Gallery. The exhibition included large paintings of Belfast as seen from high view-points. The urban theme continued between 2006 and 2010 when Davidson made paintings based on the illusionary world seen in city window reflections.

== Portraits ==
Since 2010 Davidson's work has been concerned with the human face and the resulting large scale head paintings are now recognised internationally. His portraits of Brad Pitt, Seamus Heaney and Michael Longley are held in the collection of the Smithsonian National Portrait Gallery in Washington DC, the Ulster Museum in Belfast and the National Gallery of Ireland in Dublin respectively.

A permanent exhibition of Davidson's work is on display at Lyric Theatre, Belfast, where he personally presented his work to Queen Elizabeth II and the President of Ireland during the Royal visit to Northern Ireland in 2012.

Davidson's work has been exhibited in the BP Portrait Award at the National Portrait Gallery in London in 2011, 2012 and 2013.In 2012 he won the Visitors' Choice Award.

In December 2015 Davidson was commissioned by Time magazine to paint German Chancellor Angela Merkel, for the cover for its "Person of the Year" issue.

In 2016, Davidson was commissioned to paint a portrait of Queen Elizabeth II for Co-operation Ireland. This painting was unveiled at Crosby Hall in London by the Queen in November 2016. In the same year, he portrayed Jamie Dornan which he unveiled in his studio that year.

In 2017, the National Portrait Gallery unveiled Davidson's portrait of Ed Sheeran, a painting which has been acquired for its collection.

In 2019, Bill Clinton unveiled an official portrait painted by Davidson. The painting now hangs in the Clinton Foundation, Little Rock, Arkansas.

== Jerusalem ==
In 2014, and continuing the theme of large scale portraits, Davidson turned his attention to the city of Jerusalem. He made paintings of twelve individuals who lived or worked in the city. They came from different backgrounds, cultures and traditions. Among these dozen Jerusalemites were Jews, Muslims, Christians, a politician, a monk, a doctor, a peace activist, a hotel worker and a Holocaust survivor. In 2017, the exhibition went on tour to London and New York, where it was shown at 92nd Street Y.

== Silent Testimony ==
Davidson's 2015 exhibition of portrait paintings entitled 'Silent Testimony' tells the stories of eighteen people who are connected by their individual experiences of loss through Northern Ireland's 30 years of violence known as the Troubles. This exhibition was on show at the Ulster Museum Belfast during 2015, before embarking on a tour which included the Centre Culturel Irlandais in Paris and Dublin Castle. The Exhibition was on display in Derry at the Nerve Visual Gallery in Ebrington Square in 2018 and at The National Memorial Arboretum in Staffordshire in 2019. In 2018, the Irish and British Missions to The United Nations invited Davidson to show the exhibition and speak at the UN Headquarters in New York.

== Awards and honours ==
- 2021 – Davidson was named as Chancellor of Ulster University.
- 2016 – Davidson was awarded an honorary doctorate from Queen's University, Belfast for distinction in art.
- 2015 – US/Ireland Alliance Honor, Los Angeles
- 2012 – University of Ulster Distinguished Graduate of the Year Award, Belfast
- 2012 – BP Portrait Visitors' Choice Award, National Portrait Gallery, London
