= Institute of Nursing and Health Research =

UK research institute

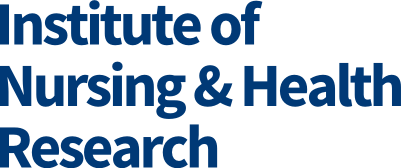
- Logo of Ulster University Institute of Nursing and Health Research.
- Focus: Allied Healthcare, Biomedical Science, Health and Pharmacological research
- Director: Prof. Tanya McCance
- Faculty: Faculty of Life and Health Sciences
- Staff: 30 Researchers and 10 professors
- Key people: All full members
- Endowment: £5.7 million in awards (2011-2013) + others.
- Members: 39 Full members, 23 associate members
- Subsidiaries: 5 research centres
- Owner: Ulster University
- Formerly called: Institute of Nursing Research
- Location: Belfast, Jordanstown, and Magee College, Northern Ireland, United Kingdom
- Website: science.ulster.ac.uk/inhr/

The Ulster University's Institute of Nursing and Health Research (INHR), previously known as the University of Ulster's Institute of Nursing Research, is a research institute of Ulster University which is physically located at the Jordanstown, Coleraine and Magee campus'. Within the institute, there are over 30 researchers and 10 professors based on the Jordanstown, Coleraine and Magee campuses of the university. In addition, the INHR has approximately 90 doctoral students researching and studying towards their chosen topics. Members of the Institute can either be full members or associate members, however visiting professors are often closely involved in research.

== Centres ==
The institute has five main centres:

- Centre for Health and Rehabilitation Technologies
- Centre for Intellectual and Developmental Disabilities - which initiates research and evaluation studies to inform the development and organisation of policy and services for people with disabilities.
- Managing Chronic Illness - which conducts rigorous research into holistic care, responsive to the needs of those living with a chronic condition.
- Maternal, Fetal and Infant Research Centre, which encompasses two main research clusters: perinatal epidemiology and midwifery research
- Person-Centred Practice - which focuses on the enhancement of knowledge and expertise in person centred practice.

== Governance ==
Led by a director, their role is to shape the institute and ensure research is maintained at a high level; in addition to producing research themselves. Currently the director is Professor Kader Parhoo. Professor pArhoo is responsible to the Dean of the Faculty of Life and Health Sciences as the institute is one of several research intensive departments attached to this faculty. The institute is a collaboration between two schools in this faculty, the School of Nursing and the School of Health Science.

The institute is split into centres:

- Centre for Intellectual and Developmental Disabilities (Head of Centre, Dr Laurence Taggart)
- Centre for Health and Rehabilitation Technologies (Head of Centre, Dr Brenda O'Neil)
- Managing Chronic Illness Research Centre (Head of Centre, Professor Vivien Coates)
- Centre for Maternal, Foetal and Infant Research (Head of Centre, Professor Helen Dolk)
- Person-centred Practice Research Centre (Head of Centre, Professor Tanya McCance)

== Research Ranking ==
=== 2014 ===
The 2014 Research Excellence Framework (REF) received 38 staff submissions for consideration. As a result, 94.6% of all work was deemed to be 94.6% being "internationally excellent or world leading". In addition, 100% of research submitted was given an impact and environment rating of 3* or 4*. Overall the institute achieved 86% 3* or 4* with 23 submissions being world leading (4*), 63 being internationally excellent, 10 being 2*, 3 being 1* and 1 submission not being considered.
