= Gerry McKenna =

Northern Irish politician (born 1953)

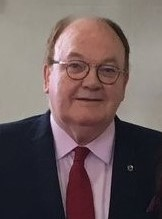

Patrick Gerald McKenna, DL, FIBMS, FRSB, MRIA (born 10 December 1953), known informally and widely as Gerry McKenna, is a Chartered Biologist (CBiol, 1982) and Chartered Scientist (CSci, 2006) from Northern Ireland.

Professor McKenna, grew up in the townland of Lisbanlemneigh situated between Benburb and The Moy, County Tyrone and attended St Patrick's Academy, Dungannon, the New University of Ulster and the Queen's University Belfast. He is most well known for his long affiliation with the University of Ulster in Coleraine, where he was honoured with the Freedom of the Borough of Coleraine and as Coleraine Business Person of the Year, as well as being appointed Deputy Lieutenant and later Vice Lord Lieutenant for County Londonderry.

== University of Ulster leadership ==
During McKenna's successive tenures as founding Director of the Biomedical Sciences Research Centre, Head of Biological & Biomedical Sciences, Dean of Science, Pro Vice Chancellor (Research), and finally Vice Chancellor/President of the University of Ulster, the university became the foremost provider of healthcare programs (both undergraduate and postgraduate), and was top-ranked for research (5*) in Biomedical Sciences and Celtic Studies in the UK, one of only 20 universities to have two 5* ratings. It also became the largest university on the island of Ireland. The university rose to 27th in Quality Research Funding (research power) in the UK and was shortlisted for Sunday Times University of the Year.

McKenna has strongly promoted social inclusion, most notably via the acclaimed 'Step Up' program for school pupils from disadvantaged backgrounds. He also established a range of e-learning programs via Campus One. McKenna's views on the challenges facing higher education in the 21st century and his approach to university management are described in his 2004 publication on the topic.

== Benburb Priory ==
McKenna has led a substantial restructuring of the governance and management of Benburb Servite Priory including the establishment of its Library and Museum, and the development of the Priory as a major spiritual, cultural and community centre.

== Royal Irish Academy ==
McKenna has played a leading role, as Vice President and later Senior Vice President, in the Royal Irish Academy, Ireland’s leading academic body. He was elected to the Council of the Academy, in 2017, also becoming an Academy Vice President. He chaired the Academy’s North-South Committee and was a co-founder and co-chair of the Celtic Academies Alliance involving the Royal Society of Edinburgh and the Learned Society of Wales. He chaired a major all-island review during 2019-2021 on Higher Education Futures resulting in reports on higher education values, the future landscape of HE, equality diversity and inclusion in HE, the role of HE in regions and place, and re-imagining the future of research across the island of Ireland. McKenna was also principal author in 2024 of a major RIA report 'Finding Common Ground: Building Community' focussed on the North-West of the island of Ireland. The report recommended inter alia independent oversight of higher education in Northern Ireland and outlined the potential for a North-West cross border university.

== Founder or co-founder ==
- Heads of University Centres of Biomedical Sciences (HUCBMS)
- Universities Ireland
- University of Ulster Foundation with support from Atlantic Philanthropies
- US-Ireland R&D Partnership.
- Irish Universities Nutrition Alliance (IUNA)
- Catalyst Inc (formerly Northern Ireland Science Park)
- Benburb Priory Library & Museum
- Benburb Priory Ltd
- Order of Mary Servite Trust
- Celtic Academies Alliance

== Affiliations and honours ==
- Chair, Health Technology and Informatics Advisory Committee; Biomedical Sciences Advisor; Hong Kong Polytechnic University
- Chair, Management Board of the Benburb Servite Priory Library and Museum
- Chair, Benburb Priory Ltd
- Chair, Board of Order of Mary Servite Trust and Chair of Finance Committee
- Member, Quality Assurance Agency for Higher Education Benchmarking Working Groups for Biosciences and Biomedical Sciences
- Member, Advisory Committee, Faculty of Health and Social Sciences, Hong Kong Polytechnic University
- Member, International Advisory Board, University of Kufa
- Chair, Universities Ireland
- Freedom of the Borough of Coleraine.
- Keys to the City of Portland, Maine
- Honoree, Harvard Friends of Celtic Studies and the Flax Trust America, New York City
- Coleraine Businessperson of the Year
- Honorary Doctorates, National University of Ireland (NUI) and Queen's University Belfast
- Eponymous Gerry McKenna Award for Excellence in Medical Science, Western Health and Social Services Trust
- Chair, Northern Ireland Foresight, Life and Health Technologies Panel
- Chair, Independent Advisory Group, Doctoral Training Alliance
- Co-chair, Royal Irish Academy Brexit Taskforce
- Chair, Royal Irish Academy, North-South Standing Committee
- Chair, Royal Irish Academy, Higher Education Futures Taskforce
- Senior Vice President, Vice President, Member, Member of Council, Royal Irish Academy
- President, President Emeritus, Hon Executive Secretary, Heads of University Centres of Biomedical Sciences (HUCBMS)
- Vice Lord Lieutenant for County Londonderry
- Chair, Coleraine Future Town Fund Board
- Member, Hong Kong Research Grants Council; Science, Medicine, Engineering, and Technology Selection Panel

Academic offices
Preceded by Trevor Smith, Lord Smith of Clifton	Vice-Chancellor of the University of Ulster; 1999–2006	Succeeded by Richard Barnett
