= Richard Barnett (economist) =

British academic

Sir Richard Robert Barnett (born 17 October 1952) is a British academic in economics and management and former Vice-Chancellor of Ulster University. He was knighted in the 2015 New Year Honours for services to higher education and business in Northern Ireland.

== Footnotes ==
Academic offices
Preceded by Gerry McKenna	Vice Chancellor, Ulster University; 2006–2015	Succeeded by Paddy Nixon
