= Ulster University =

Multi-campus university in Northern Ireland

- Irish: Ollscoil Uladh; Scots: Ulstèr Universitie
- Former names: Magee College/ Magee University College; New University of Ulster
- Type: Public research university
- Established: 1865 as Magee College; 1968 as New University of Ulster
- Affiliations: European University Association; Association of Commonwealth Universities; Universities UK; Universities Ireland
- Endowment: £17.2 million (2025)
- Budget: £304.4 million (2024/25)
- Chancellor: Colin Davidson
- Vice-Chancellor: Paul Bartholomew
- Faculty: 1,665
- Students: 32,915 (2024/25)
- Undergraduates: 21,005 (2024/25)
- Postgraduates: 11,910 (2024/25)
- Location: Belfast, Coleraine, Jordanstown, Derry, London, Birmingham, Lusail: Belfast, County Antrim; 54°36′13″N 5°55′43″W; Coleraine, County Londonderry; 55°8′52″N 6°40′20″W; Jordanstown, County Antrim; 54°41′10″N 5°52′55″W; Derry, County Londonderry; 55°0′23″N 7°19′27″W
- Campus: Varied (urban/ rural)
- Colours: Logo: Navy blue & bronze Seal: Red & gold
- Website: www.ulster.ac.uk

Ulster University (Irish: Ollscoil Uladh; Ulster Scots: Ulstèr Universitie or Ulstèr Varsitie), legally the University of Ulster, is a multi-campus public research university located in Northern Ireland. It is often referred to informally and unofficially as Ulster, or by the abbreviation UU. It is the largest university in Northern Ireland and the second-largest university on the island of Ireland, after the federal National University of Ireland.

Established in 1865 as Magee College, the college took its modern form in 1984 after the merger of the New University of Ulster established in 1968, and Ulster Polytechnic, incorporating its four Northern Irish campuses under the University of Ulster banner. The university incorporated its four campuses in 1984; located in Belfast, Coleraine, Derry (Magee College), and Jordanstown. The university has branch campuses in both London and Birmingham, and an extensive distance learning provision. The university rebranded as Ulster University in October 2014, including a revised visual identity, though its legal name remained unchanged.

The university is a member of the Association of Commonwealth Universities, the European University Association, Universities Ireland and Universities UK.

== History ==
In 1963, the Government of Northern Ireland appointed a committee to review facilities for university and higher technical education in Northern Ireland, modeled on the committee on higher education in Great Britain chaired by Lionel Robbins which had reported that year. The Northern Ireland committee was chaired by Sir John Lockwood, Master of Birkbeck College, London. The Robbins Report had recommended a substantial expansion of higher education in Great Britain, partly triggered by the Anderson Report of 1960, which increased demand by instigating a student grants scheme. The Lockwood committee was expected to recommend a second university in Northern Ireland, after Queen's University Belfast.

In Derry, groups led by the University for Derry Committee hoped that Magee University College would become the new university. Founded as a Presbyterian training college in 1865, Magee was associated with the Royal University of Ireland which existed between 1880 and 1908, and then with the University of Dublin and Queen's Belfast. However, the Lockwood Report criticised Magee's cramped site, complacent culture, and "eccentric" and "barely workable" administration; it found its claim to be based on historical entitlement rather than planning for future. Instead, the report recommended a greenfield university in Coleraine and closing Magee. This was controversial, with many nationalists suggesting the unionist O'Neill ministry favoured a unionist-majority area rather than nationalist-majority Derry. Disgruntlement fed the Northern Ireland civil rights movement which helped spark the Troubles. The "New University of Ulster" (NUU) enrolled its first students at Coleraine in 1968. Magee was not closed but incorporated in the NUU, which obtained a charter in 1970.

Following a review of higher education in Northern Ireland under the chairmanship of Sir Henry Chilver in 1982, the Northern Ireland Office (NIO) decided to merge NUU with another Lockwood Report foundation, the Ulster Polytechnic in Jordanstown. The NUU charter was surrendered and the merged University of Ulster (dropping "New" from the name) got its charter on 1 October 1984. Later the Belfast School of Art and Design (founded in 1849) became part of the university.

Campus One, the Virtual Campus of the university, was launched on 8 October 2001 which successfully facilitated the provision of undergraduate and postgraduate level courses via distance learning. The university now simply refers to this as distance learning.

The university formerly had a laboratory named 'The University of Ulster Freshwater Laboratory' at Traad Point on the shore of Lough Neagh in Ballymaguigan. The Freshwater Laboratory, although not a campus, was a site of the university and consisted of on-campus accommodation, classrooms and testing labs. Courses offered were in agriculture, the wildlife of Lough Neagh, water testing and other aquatic courses. The site is now owned by Magherafelt District Council. By 2010, the area had become popular with the locals for camping, fishing and sailing.

=== Financial restructuring ===
In autumn 2011 Vice-Chancellor Barnett announced a programme of financial restructuring with the aim of reducing the number of staff employed by the university from 3,150 to 3,000. Staff at the university expressed concern about the proposed means and impact of the restructuring, citing "the use of the threat of compulsory redundancy to bully and intimidate staff" and the belief that the university was "abdicating its responsibilities to the wider community that funds it".

In April 2012, the Ulster University branch of the University and College Union (UCU) declared a formal dispute with university management over its implementation of the restructuring, stating that the recourse to "premature deadlines and unwarranted threats of compulsory redundancy" was "unreasonable as well as contrary to University policy and corporate goals".

The reasons for cuts are not, however, unique to Ulster University. First of all, there was the Great Recession that began in 2008 and engendered a change in government and a sharp reduction in public spending. Secondly, there were issues pertaining to tuition fees. As a result of political devolution in the United Kingdom (mandated from 1998 onwards), fees differ in the four countries that make up the union. For undergraduate tuition, they are currently £9,250 in England but only £4,030 in Northern Ireland. For a while, the low fees in Northern Ireland were hailed as a triumph for devolution and seemed a tool to facilitate access for less advantaged students. Universities in Northern Ireland fared reasonably well financially. However, as Pritchard and Slowey point out, if the government does not make up the shortfall, low fees left Northern Ireland universities at a disadvantage compared to their English counterparts.

In 2015, the UK Government reduced the funding allocation for Higher Education Institutions by 8.2%. Both Northern Ireland universities had to make cuts. Queen's University announced immediate job cuts of 236 and student number reductions of ca. 290 (1,010 over the next three years). Ulster also announced its intention of cutting over 200 jobs and 250 student places in 2015–16 (1,200 over the following three years).

On 20 June 2023, the Government of Ireland announced that it was providing approximately €45 million in funding to Ulster University.

== Campuses ==
An online distance learning provision offers Ulster University courses globally. The university was among the first Universities to offer degree level programs through its previous "Campus One" program and was a pioneer in the introduction of online degree level courses in Biomedical Sciences. The university was subsequently selected by the European Commission to deliver the world's first Higher Educational Programme in Hydrogen Safety Engineering.

=== Belfast ===
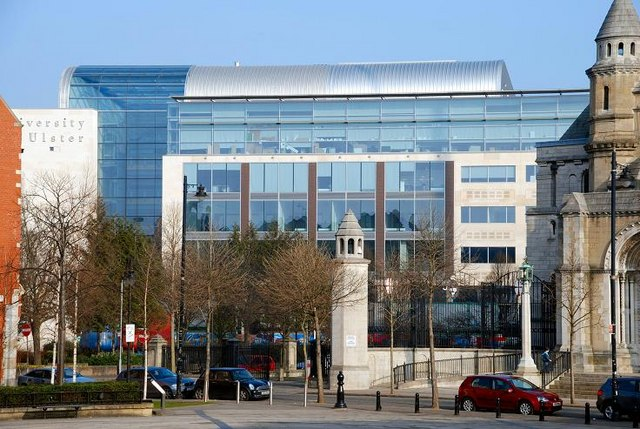
School of Art and Design from Writers Square

Ulster University's Belfast campus is in the city's Cathedral Quarter, which is the city's artistic and cultural centre. Although traditionally associated with art and home to the university's School of Art, originally inaugurated as the Belfast School of Art and Design in 1849, the campus has a range of subjects including accounting, architecture, business, computing, engineering, hospitality, politics, games design, photography and digital animation. The award-winning Law Clinic is based at the Belfast campus, offering free legal advice on social security and employment law.

Ulster University has been expanding and developing the Belfast campus since 2009 as part of one of Northern Ireland's largest-ever urban developments. The first phase of this development opened in 2015 and completion of the project was due in 2019. In September 2021 the first students were welcomed to the new campus. The fully completed campus began accepting students starting in the 2022/23 academic year. In 2024, 15,000 students and staff are based in the city centre.

=== Coleraine ===
Ulster University's Coleraine campus is on the banks of the River Bann with views to the North Coast and County Donegal hills. Subjects taught at Coleraine include biomedical sciences, environmental science and geography, pharmacy, psychology, the humanities, film and journalism, travel and tourism as well as teacher training.

A major development at Coleraine was the introduction of the degree programme in biomedical sciences in 1980. This subject area grew and was ranked first in the UK in three successive Research Assessment Exercises (1996, 2001 and 2008). It also spawned the development of related subject areas including human nutrition, radiography, clinical science, optometry, podiatry, pharmacy, pharmacology and stratified medicine.

In 2002, £14.5 million was awarded under the Support Programme for University Research (SPUR) to establish the Centre for Molecular Biosciences at Coleraine.

The Coleraine campus now hosts a number of courses which were previously held at the School of Hotel, Leisure and Tourism in Portrush. This Portrush site closed in 2008, with courses relocated to the Coleraine and the newly developed Belfast campuses.

In 2009, the university launched a new Master of Pharmacy (MPharm) course at Coleraine.

In July 2011, in cooperation with Zhejiang University of Media and Communications, The Confucius Institute at Ulster University was developed. The Confucius Institute is part of a network of 322 institutes in over 50 countries which promote and teach Chinese language and culture and facilitate cultural exchanges aimed at fostering trade links with China.

In spring 2015, a new £5.1 million teaching block was completed at the Coleraine Campus. Later in 2015, a new Faculty of Arts building was opened following a £6.75 million investment. It is now home to a digital media archive, updated media facilities, including radio and television studios, and a postgraduate research centre as well as office and administration accommodation.

=== Jordanstown ===
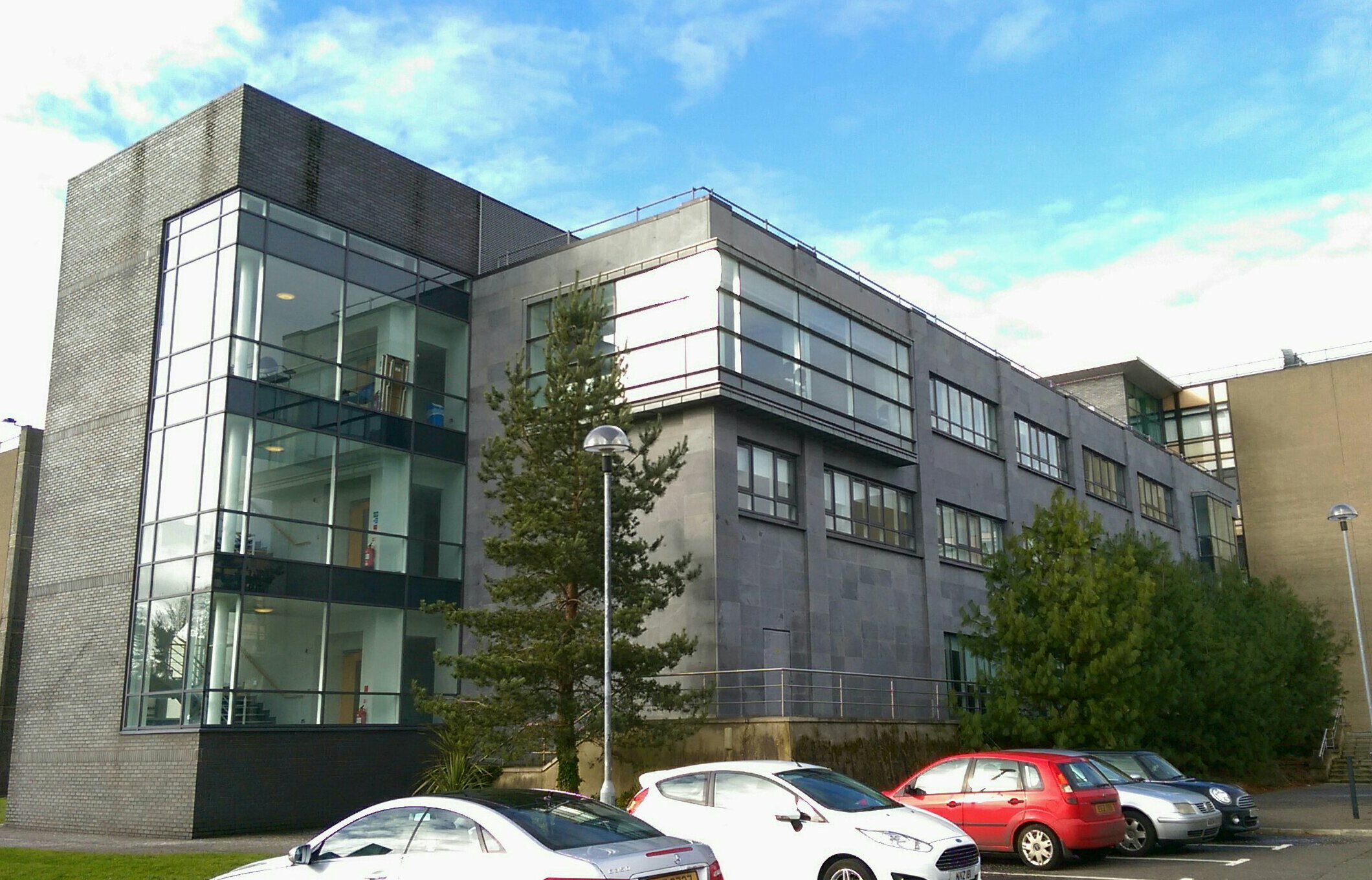
Jordanstown School of Health Sciences

Ulster University's Jordanstown campus, often informally referred to as UUJ, was formerly the site of the Ulster College of Physical Education, one of several Colleges which came together in the formation of the Ulster Polytechnic, and is the largest university campus. The 114-acre (0.46 km^{2}) site is located seven miles north of Belfast city centre situated at the foot of the Antrim Hills overlooking Belfast Lough. The buildings are mostly situated around a central mall with on-site stores and services.

The campus has a strong profile in business, engineering, construction, social sciences (including law), communication and academic disciplines relating to the science and coaching of sport. Sport plays a significant part in the life of the campus. It is home to the Sports Institute of Northern Ireland, a partnership between the university and Sport Northern Ireland, and most of Northern Ireland's elite athletes train in the facilities.

The campus is also the only university in Northern Ireland to offer undergraduate and postgraduate courses in various Allied Health Professions, such as Cardiac and Respiratory Clinical Physiology, Diagnostic and Therapeutic Radiography, Occupational Therapy, Physiotherapy, Podiatry and Speech and Language Therapy. The campus is also the only campus delivering courses in Biomedical Engineering within Northern Ireland.

=== Magee ===
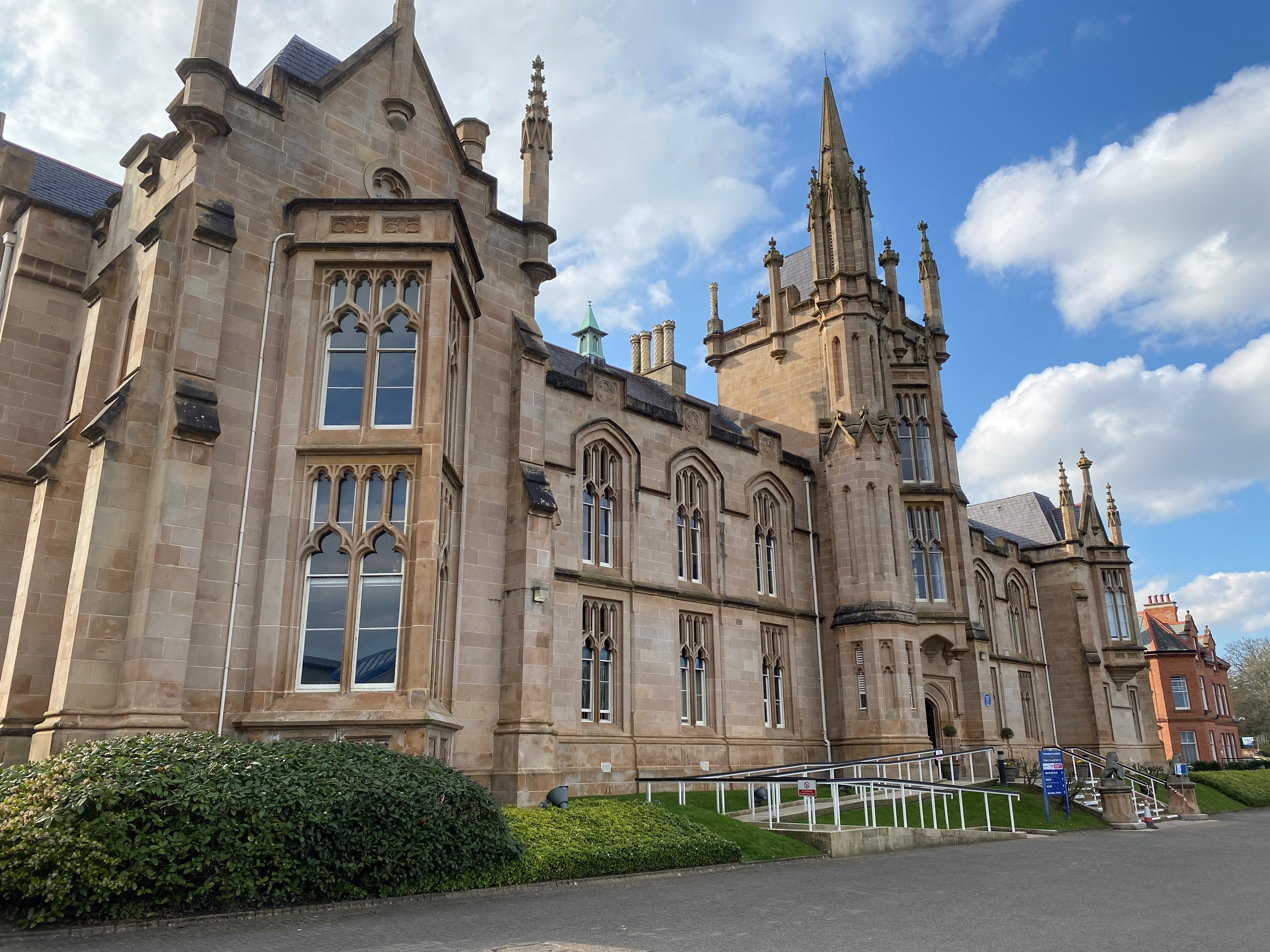
Magee main building

The Magee campus in the city of Derry comprises a mixture of historic and new buildings in a Victorian residential area. It was named after Martha Magee and opened in 1865 as a Presbyterian Christian arts and theological college. Since 1953, it has had no religious affiliation, and was one of the founding campuses of the university in 1968. Ongoing investment in the Magee campus provides teaching, research and support facilities for students and staff. This comprises a student residential village offering en-suite accommodation, a library, the Intelligent Systems Research Centre, the Foyle Arts Building and a Centre for Engineering and Renewable Energy offering a wide range of Engineering courses.

In addition to the university's teaching and learning facilities, the campus has on-site residential, catering and sports facilities. Sports facilities include a multi-purpose sports hall, fitness suite and studio as well as a grass and floodlit synthetic 3G pitch with a pavilion and changing facilities.

=== Branch campuses ===
The university has a partnership with QA Higher Education, which operates two branch campuses in England: London and Birmingham. The London campus is in Holborn, and the Birmingham campus is in the Centre City Tower. The campuses offer courses in business, finance and computing.

=== City University Qatar (CUQ) in partnership with Ulster University ===
City University Qatar was established in 2018 as City University College (CUC). In 2019, the institution entered into an affiliation agreement with Ulster University, enabling it to deliver Ulster-validated degree programmes in Qatar.

City University Qatar Campus

The partnership agreement was officially signed in June 2019 and formally launched in February 2020. Under this collaboration, the college introduced undergraduate programmes including the BSc (Hons) in Business Studies, with the first cohort enrolling in top-up degrees in September 2020.

In October 2020, the Ministry of Education and Higher Education directed that the institution be known as City University College in partnership with Ulster University.

In 2024, the Ministry officially recognised the institution as a university, renaming it City University Qatar (CUQ Ulster) and relocating its campus from Doha to Lusail. The transition marked its expansion into engineering, science and advanced technology disciplines.

City University Qatar's main campus is located in the Smart City district of Lusail. The purpose-built campus spans approximately 11,500 square metres and includes lecture theatres, laboratories, computer facilities, study spaces, a library, student lounges, and recreational facilities.

== Organisation and governance ==
=== Governance ===
Vice-Chancellors

- Sir Derek Birley (1983–1991)
- Trevor Arthur Smith, Baron Smith of Clifton (1991–1999)
- Gerry McKenna (1999–2006)
- Sir Richard Barnett (2006–2015)
- Paddy Nixon (2015–2020)
- Paul Bartholomew (2020–)

Chancellors

- Ralph Grey, Baron Grey of Naunton (1984–1993)
- Baroness Neuberger (1994–2000)
- Sir Richard Nichols (2002–2010)
- James Nesbitt (2010–2021)
- Colin Davidson (2021 -)

=== Faculties ===
There are four faculties of Ulster University, which are associated with a number of schools:

- Arts, Humanities and Social Sciences
  - Applied Social and Policy Sciences
  - Arts and Humanities
  - Belfast School of Art
  - Communication and Media
  - Education
  - Law
- Computing, Engineering and the Built Environment
  - Belfast School of Architecture and the Built Environment
  - Computing
  - School of Computing, Engineering and Intelligent Systems
  - Engineering
- Life and Health Sciences
  - Biomedical Sciences
  - Geography and Environmental Sciences
  - Health Sciences
  - Medicine
  - Nursing and Paramedic Science
  - Pharmacy and Pharmaceutical Sciences
  - Psychology
  - Sport and Exercise Science
- Ulster University Business School

== Academic profile ==
The university's course provision is the largest in Northern Ireland, covering arts, business, engineering, information technology, life and health sciences, management, and social sciences. Courses have a strong vocational element and the majority include a period of industrial or professional placement.

The university has expanded its offerings in media, film, and emerging technologies, aligning with Northern Ireland's growing creative sector.

=== Rankings ===
Rankings
National rankings
- Complete (2027): 47
- Guardian (2027): 58
- Times / Sunday Times (2027): 34

Global rankings
- ARWU (2026): 801–900
- QS (2027): 595=
- THE (2026): 601–800

Ulster University was shortlisted for Sunday Times University of the Year in 2001 and was awarded UK and Ireland University of the Year at the Times Higher Education Awards in 2024.The university is ranked annually by the Complete University Guide, The Guardian, and jointly by The Times and The Sunday Times; this makes up the UK University League Table rankings.

Ulster University is highly rated by students. It was ranked first in the UK in 2024 and second in 2025 in the Student Crowd awards. It ranks first in the UK for Teaching Quality, first for Course Content, and best for job prospects. Students enjoy excellent facilities, teaching and industry links. With 97% of graduates in work or further study according to the Graduate Outcomes survey, Ulster University is the top Northern Ireland university.

The institution is a leading modern university ranked in the top 150 global institutions under 50 years of age in The Times Higher Education 150 Under 50 World University rankings.

Ulster is in the top 20% in international outlook in 2016, registering as 401–500 in the THE World University Rankings.

Ulster scores highly for student satisfaction with the 2018 National Student Survey unveiling 87% satisfaction rates—ranking 23rd out of 154 UK universities.

In 2019 Ulster ranked 2nd in the UK for the UK University Acceptance rates on a university review platform StudentCrowd.

=== Research ===
The university embarked upon a policy of research selectivity in 1993 funded partially by Northern Ireland Development Funds (NIDevR) administered via the Northern Ireland Higher Education Council. The policy resulted in greatly improved performance by the university in subsequent Research Assessment Exercises (1996, 2001 and 2008; 3 subject areas, biomedical sciences, nursing and Celtic studies were ranked in the top 5 in the UK in the latter exercise) and in improving its publication output, external research funding and knowledge transfer activities. The establishment in 2002–2003 of a number of research institutes in areas of established strength and the receipt of over £40 million through the Support Programme for University Research (SPUR), funded jointly by Atlantic Philanthropies and the Northern Ireland Department for Employment and Learning (DEL), yielded a further significant enhancement in the university's research performance.

The Research Excellence Framework 2014 exercise identified the institution as one of the top five universities in the UK for research in law, biomedical sciences, nursing and art and design. Under some metrics, it ranked the university top in Northern Ireland for research into biomedical sciences, law, business and management, architecture and built environment, art and design, social policy, sport, media studies and nursing.

The Research Excellence Framework 2014 identified that 72% of the university's research activity was world-leading or internationally excellent. Additionally the REF evaluation identified the university as ranked:

==== Research Institutes ====
There are 15 Research Institutes at the university. These are:

- Arts & Humanities Research Institute (AHRI)
- Biomedical Sciences Research Institute
- Built Environment Research Institute
- Business and Management Research Institute
- Centre for Media Research
- Computer Science Research Institute
- Engineering Research Institute (ERI)
- Environmental Sciences Research Institute
- Institute of Nursing and Health Research
- Institute for Research in Social Sciences
- Irish and Celtic Studies Research Institute
- Psychology Research Institute
- Research Institute for Art and Design (RIAD)
- Sport and Exercise Sciences Research Institute
- Transitional Justice Institute

== Student life ==
=== Students' union ===
Formed in 1984, the students' union of Ulster University operates as a "not for profit, charitable membership organisation". As of 2025, it reportedly had approximately 25,000 student members.

=== Sport ===
Ulster participates in British Universities and Colleges Sport (BUCS) competitions and events, as well as those of Student Sport Ireland.

Ulster University F.C. compete in the Northern Amateur Football League.

Ulster University's men's basketball team participated in the Super League in the 2023–24 season.

== Notable alumni ==
Ulster has a large body of notable alumni, including MPs Kate Hoey, Gregory Campbell, Michelle Gildernew, Roberta Blackman-Woods and former deputy First Minister of Northern Ireland Mark Durkan, MLAs Alban Maginness, Basil McCrea and Seán Neeson, writers and authors including Anne Devlin, Dinah Jefferies, Colin Duriez, Calum Neill and Aodán Mac Póilin, poets including Gerald Dawe, Brendan Hamill, and Vivimarie Vanderpoorten and artists including Jack Coulter, Colin Davidson, Oliver Jeffers, Freddie Freeburn, Victor Sloan, Andre Stitt, John Luke and John Kindness. Other alumni include film editor Brian Philip Davis, composer Brian Irvine, musician David Lyttle, comedians including Omid Djalili and Cormac Hardy, former hostage and writer Brian Keenan, historian Simon Kitson, biomedical scientist and former Vice-Chancellor Gerry McKenna, visual artist Willie Doherty, photographer Mary Fitzpatrick, film producer Michael Riley, rugby player Brian Robinson, radio and television personality Gerry Anderson, nursing academic Alison Kitson, former CEO of Cognizant Brian Humphries and senior police officer Barbara Gray.

Notable current and former academics who have worked at Ulster include historian Antony Alcock, political scientist Monica McWilliams, poets Andrew Waterman and James Simmons, literary critic Walter Allen, physicist and subsequently Vice-Chancellor of the University of Sheffield, Gareth Roberts, mathematician Ralph Henstock, head of the School of Electrical and Mechanical Engineering John Anderson (inventor), Irish film historian Martin McLoone, solar energy technologist and President of Dublin Institute of Technology, Brian Norton, law professors Brice Dickson and Denis Moloney, Professor of Nursing Research Brendan George McCormack. Turner Prize-nominated video artist Willie Doherty, Official War Artist Paul Seawright and live artist Anne Seagrave, and professor of ophthalmology Jennifer Craig.

Academics who were elected to membership of the Royal Irish Academy while based at Ulster include Bertie Ussher (Classics), Norman Gibson (Economics), Amyan Macfadyen (Biology), Bill Watts (Chemistry), Gerry McKenna (Biomedical Sciences, Genetics), Sean Strain (Biomedical Sciences, Nutrition), Marshall McCabe (Geology), Peter Flatt (Biomedical Sciences, Diabetes), Séamus MacMathúna (Celtic Studies), Robert Anthony Welch (Literature), Vani Borooah (Economics), Máréaid Nic Craith (Celtic Studies), Graham Gargett (French), Helene McNulty (Biomedical Sciences, Nutrition), Pól Ó Dochartaigh (German), Robert McBride (French), Ullrich Kockel (ethnography), John McCloskey (Geosciences), Rosalind Pritchard (Education), Derek Jackson (Environmental Sciences), Raffaella Folli (Linguistics), Andrew Cooper (Geosciences), Pilar Fernandez-Ibanez (Environmental Engineering).

Recipients of honorary degrees include the former President of the United States Bill Clinton, former President of Ireland Mary McAleese, US Secretary of State Hillary Clinton, former Speaker of the United States House of Representatives Nancy Pelosi, football managers Sir Alex Ferguson and Brendan Rodgers, poet Seamus Heaney, writers Seamus Deane, Brian Friel, Frank McGuinness and Colm Tóibín, activists May Blood and Aung San Suu Kyi, actors Arnold Schwarzenegger, Amanda Burton and Ewan McGregor, racehorse trainer Vincent O'Brien, bishops Seán Brady, Robin Eames, James Mehaffey, Edward Daly and Desmond Tutu, singers Enya, Van Morrison and Tommy Makem, politicians John Hume and Garret FitzGerald, politician, writer and historian Conor Cruise O'Brien, US lawyer John Connorton, US diplomat Jim Lyons, Gaelic footballer Peter Canavan, rugby player David Humphreys, golfers Darren Clarke and Graeme McDowell, former governor of Hong Kong Chris Patten and triple jumper Jonathan Edwards.

== See also ==
- Armorial of UK universities
- Education in Northern Ireland
- List of universities in Northern Ireland
