= School of Computing, Engineering and Intelligent Systems, Ulster University =

UK academic institution

Ulster University School of Computing, Engineering and Intelligent Systems
- Focus: Computer Science, Game Development, Robotics, Research
- Head of School: Jim Harkin
- Staff: 36 (27 academic, 5 clerical, 4 technical)
- Location: Magee College, Derry, County Londonderry, Northern Ireland
- Website: cis.ulster.ac.uk/

The School of Computing, Engineering and Intelligent Systems is a school in the Faculty of Computing, Engineering and the Built Environment of Ulster University. The school focuses on teaching and research in the main areas of computer science, games, electronics, robotics and multimedia. It currently offers five main undergraduate bachelor's degree programmes in the above areas and three one-year taught postgraduate master's degrees in the areas of creative technologies, intelligent systems and financial services. PhD research opportunities are also available through the research graduate school.

== History ==
The School of Computing and Intelligent Systems (SCIS) was formed in 2001 through a merger of the School of Computing and Mathematics and School of Engineering on the Magee campus. Martin McGinnity was the first Head of School (HOS) (2001-2005) and he has since moved on to become Director of the Intelligent Systems Research Centre. Liam Maguire was the HOS (2005 to date). His inaugural professorial lecture took place in March 2009 to an invited audience.

== Notable activities ==
Students past and present have been taking part in competitions and events organised by leading software companies and industry. In 2009, students on the games course were participants in an international video games competition, taking part in the 'Dare to be Digital' competition in Edinburgh. Microsoft Corporation has also collaborated with SCIS in the hosting of the Games Summit, entitled XNAFEST 2009. In 2008, top computing students were rewarded for their academic achievements in an awards ceremony which saw students receiving prizes from some of the top IT companies in Northern Ireland.

== Research Institutes ==
Research in the School of Computing and Intelligent Systems (SCIS) is carried out by the Intelligent Systems Research Centre (ISRC) undertaken by academic staff. ISRC was officially launched in May 2007 by the then Economy Minister Nigel Dodds This research is in the areas of computational intelligence, neural networks, fuzzy systems, artificial intelligence, cognitive robotics, ambient intelligence, wireless sensor networks and brain computer interfacing ISRC was opened in 2006 with £20 million invested by Invest Northern Ireland, ILEX and Ulster University. This is the largest single research investment in the 150-year history of the Magee campus.
