= Consortium for the Advanced Simulation of Light Water Reactors =

Energy Innovation Hub

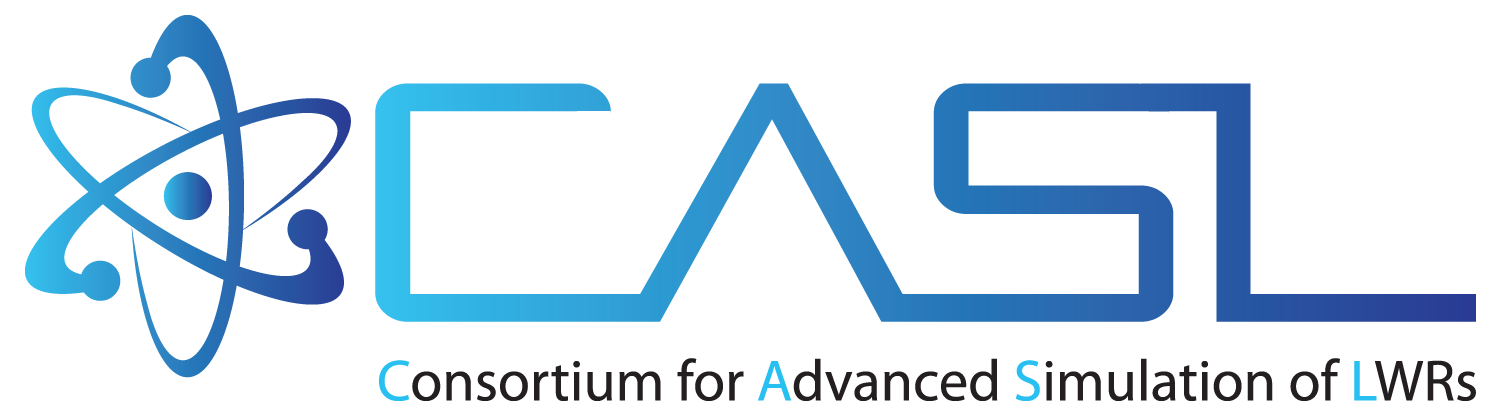
- Purpose: To provide advanced modeling and simulation solutions for commercial light water nuclear reactors.
- Location: Oak Ridge National Laboratory, Oak Ridge, Tennessee, USA
- Parent organization: ORNL Nuclear Science and Engineering Directorate
- Website: casl.gov

Consortium for the Advanced Simulation of Light Water Reactors (CASL) is an Energy Innovation Hub sponsored by United States Department of Energy (DOE) and based at Oak Ridge National Laboratory (ORNL). CASL combines fundamental research and technology development through an integrated partnership of government, academia, and industry that extends across the nuclear energy enterprise. The goal of CASL is to develop advanced computational models of light water reactors (LWRs) that can be used by utilities, fuel vendors, universities, and national laboratories to help improve the performance of existing and future nuclear reactors. CASL was created in May 2010, and was the first energy innovation hub to be awarded.

== Mission ==
The CASL mission is to develop advanced modeling and simulation (M&S) tools to improve tools available to nuclear industry in power plant design/operation/assessment; but, also designed to leverage industry and leadership-class supercomputers, such as ORNL's Titan, that will help drive increase the compute capability of industrial cluster computers used in nuclear industry. CASL combines existing M&S capabilities and with new advanced capabilities to create a usable environment that advances the industry user's opportunities towards predictive simulation of light water reactors (LWRs). This environment, designated the Virtual Environment for Reactor Applications (VERA), integrates components based on science-based models, state-of-the-art numerical methods, modern computational science and engineering practices, and rigorous verification and validation against data from operating pressurized water reactors (PWRs), single-effect experiments, and integral tests. The CASL M&S technology is configured for efficient execution on today’s leadership-class computers, advanced architecture platforms now under development, and workhorse engineering workstation clusters.

Using supercomputers to create “virtual” reactor models can further advance the safety and performance of existing and future nuclear reactors. The consortium's research and development (R&D) supports continuing improvement of reactor safety by giving engineers and scientists (M&S) tools that can be used to investigate the causes of operational issues that affect nuclear reactors. Use M&S tools can lead to reduced capital and operating costs per unit of energy produced by nuclear reactors and reductions in the amount of nuclear waste created by reactor operations. Improved understanding of the physical processes that can cause operational issues can also allow reactors to be built and operated more efficiently and at lower cost. Eventually the virtual models could also help nuclear engineers develop improved designs for next-generation reactors.

== Vision ==
The CASL vision is to predict, with confidence, the performance of nuclear reactors through comprehensive, science-based modeling and simulation technology that is deployed and applied broadly throughout the nuclear energy industry to enhance safety, reliability, and economics.

== Partners ==
CASL is a consortium funded by the US Department of Energy that consists of ten core partners and numerous contributing members. The core partners staff all positions of technical leadership and management within the consortium. They are responsible for technical execution of the CASL Capability Development Plan and provide the personnel needed to execute the plan. The CASL core partners include four DOE national laboratories (Oak Ridge National Laboratory, Idaho, Los Alamos National Laboratory, and Sandia National Laboratory); three universities (Massachusetts Institute of Technology, North Carolina State University, and University of Michigan); and three industry partners (Westinghouse, Tennessee Valley Authority, and Electric Power Research Institute).

In addition to the ten core partners, CASL utilizes the expertise of other institutions all over the world. These organizations, designated "contributing partners," participate and contribute to the technical program on a regular basis. Contributing partners are selected for their expertise in a nuclear engineering field relevant to CASL, and bring technical insight to CASL's industry challenge problems.

== Publications ==
CASL scientists, engineers, and mathematicians disseminate their R&D strategies, approach, and results in the form of journal and conference papers, technical reports, and invited presentations, though not all can be shared publicly.

=== Documents ===
Contributing CASL scientists, engineers, and mathematicians consist of R&D staff, program managers, student interns, and postdoctoral associates at DOE National Laboratories. Technical staff from industry and faculty, research associates, students, and postdoctoral associates at universities are also major contributors. Contributors document their R&D strategies, methods, and results in the form of journal and conference papers, technical reports, and invited presentations, many of which CASL can share publicly.

=== Software ===
Computer/computational science and applied mathematics infrastructure

- Public release of CASL infrastructure software

The Virtual Environment for Reactor Applications (VERA) comprises a suite of tools for scalable simulation of nuclear reactor core behavior. Three key components of the VERA infrastructure have been released and made publicly available.

- Controlled release of CASL software

Currently, CASL software is not yet ready for public release. The CASL News page has updated information.
