= BTEC =

BTEC may refer to:

- Begumgonj Textile Engineering College, a college in Bangladesh
- Biomass Thermal Energy Council, a US advocacy organization
- Business and Technology Education Council, a British body, now part of Edexcel, which awards vocational qualifications (which are themselves still known as BTECs)
  - BTEC Level 2
  - BTEC Level 3
- Golden LEAF Biomanufacturing Training and Education Center, a training center at North Carolina State University
