= Modern Academy For Engineering & Technology =

Private university in Cairo

Modern Academy
- الأكاديمية الحديثة
- Type: Private
- Established: 2000
- Founders: Waleed Debes
- President: Dr.Saeed Ibrahim Al Rifai
- Undergraduates: 4,000
- Location: Cairo, Egypt
- Campus: Maadi, Cairo
- Website: www.modern-academy.edu.eg

The Modern Academy is a private university in Cairo, Egypt.

The Academy is divided into two separate department with two separate administration and locations:

- Modern Academy Maadi
- Modern Academy for Engineering & Technology

== Departments ==
There are five education departments in Modern Academy Maadi

- Computer Science
- Accounting and Auditing
- Business information systems
- Management
- Economics
- Basic Science

There are five education departments in Modern Academy for Engineering & Technology:

- Computer Engineering & Information Technology
- Electronic Engineering & Communication Technology
- Manufacturing Engineering & Production Technology
- Architectural Engineering & Building Technology
- Civil Engineering

== History ==
Modern academy was established on 09/12/1993 in accordance with the ministerial decree no. 1570

The academy graduate is awarded a bachelor's degree in the due major approved from His honor the higher education minister.

Bachelor of Science in computer science in accordance with the ministerial decree no. 1570 dated 09/12/1993

Bachelor of Science in management technology science in accordance with the ministerial decree no. 18 dated 2/01/1996 in the different divisions listed below

Bachelor of Science in management information systems in accordance with the ministerial decree no. 239 dated 26/02/2001

In the academic year 2000/2001, only 80 students were enrolled. In the following year, 2001/2002, this number jumped to 1,080 students.

== Academic regulations ==
=== School year ===
The school years fall in two semesters; fall and spring. Each semester lasts for 15 weeks excluding official holidays and planned vacations. Tutorial sessions are organized periodically to upgrade the student’s scientific level in the theoretical and practical directions. These sessions, in addition to allocated office hours, help effectively, in improving the results of the examinations.

Generally, students are promoted to the next year if passing all courses examined in or maximum failing in two courses from the previous year(s).

=== Academic load ===
Students do not register for their courses but study a predetermined plan of courses set by the administration. The maximum load per semester is seven courses excluding the humanities (e.g., English language).

Courses are classified into theoretical and practical courses; practical courses include laboratory (workshop) teaching hours. In contrast, there exist predetermined and selective courses.

Selective courses allow the students to select one course among several ones. Students have the chance to realize annual projects which are accompanied by practical realization. Those projects are essential to increase the students' creative capabilities.

=== Class attendance ===
Students are expected to attend classes regularly. A full-time students should attend at least 75% of classes to be allowed to sit for the final exam. If a student fails to meet this percentage, he/she will not be allowed to sit for the final exam for this course.

=== Grading system ===
Courses fall into two main categories: theoretical and practical. The grading system for all courses is predetermined by the administration and is obligatory for all teaching staff.

Grading system for theoretical courses: 20% Year work Includes mid-term, quizzes, research paper, assignments, and attendance; 80% Final Exam

Grading system for practical courses: 20% Year work: includes mid-term, quizzes, research paper, assignments, and attendance; 20% Practical exam: includes laboratory and oral exams; 60% Final exam.

The following grades will be used to designate levels of achievement and will appear on official transcripts:

- Excellent (EX) 85%-100% (A)
- Very good (V.G.) 75%-84% (B)
- Good (G) 65%-74% (C)
- Sufficient (S) 50%-64% (D)
- Weak (W) 40%-49% (E)
- Very Weak (V.W.) 30%-39% (F)

A passing grade is at least Sufficient in all courses.

=== Declaration of major ===
All students declare their major initially on admission. All students must confirm their major before the second year begins.

=== Change of major ===
Change of major is allowed only in the following case: Students joining the electrical spec. can change the major from computer Engineering & Inf. Tech. To Electronic Engineering & Communications Tech. and vice versa before the third year start.

Change of major is allowed during the first two weeks of the beginning of the second academic year for all specializations except the electrical specialization (computer and communications) where it is postponed to the third year.

=== Tutorial sessions ===
The administration provides students with an opportunity to attend free tutorial sessions parallel to regular classes in order to improve their academic standard.

Intensive tutorial programs are offered for free, during the actual study specially in the free days to improve the student’s scientific and educational standard before the mid-term and the final exams.

Tutorial sessions on lab. experiments are also allowed for students who feel that they are in need to upgrade their practical level.

=== Summer training ===
The Training Office at the Academy organizes off–campus training programs for excellent and very good students. Students are placed in a descending order according to available training opportunities. The training office officials conduct periodic assessment to ensure maximum benefit gained from the summer training programs offered. Students passing first year carry out on-campus training where they have concentrated training courses in:

- Computers
- Workshop
- Engineering drawing
- English language

Students passing the second year and the following ones have their training off-campus in factories, research centers, and industrial associations.

=== Graduation requirements ===
A student who is admitted to be graduated from the Academy is expected to fulfill the following minimum academic requirements:

- Complete all the requirements of the selected undergraduate programs with at least a "Sufficient Grade" in all courses.
- Complete the senior Graduation Project with at least a sufficient grade.

== Academic follow-up ==
One of the original services provided by the Academy is the Academic Follow-up Unit service. The unit staff is responsible for:

- Keeping detailed records for students' attendance for each course.
- Providing the teaching staff with all required teaching aids and facilities.
- Managing class schedules and solving any problems with students or professors on the spot.
- Registering results of mid-term exams. and communicating these results with the office of the Vice-Dean for Academic Affairs.
- Notifying both students and their parents with cumulative class attendance percentage every four weeks.
- Helping the Examination Department in final exams arrangements and activities

== Library ==
The library contains over 10,000 references in scientific and engineering branches. More than 300 international periodicals are available.

== Administrative facilities ==
In the Academy the Dept. of Student Affairs carries out the following services for the academy students' welfare:

- Contacting the Ministry of Higher Education to get the legal authentication for transferring students from other colleges and institutes to the academy.
- Communicating the other colleges and institutes to obtain students documents after transferring to academy.
- Communicating the Military Authorities all over Egypt to postpone the student military service during the time period of his residence in the academy.
- Preparing all documents required for students to get reduced fees for transportation by the subway (metro), governmental railway, and the transportation association.
- Issuing the required certificates for foreign students to obtain the residence visa for staying in Egypt.

== Sports ==
The Office of Youth Affairs carries out all sportive, social, scouting, etc. activities in cooperation with the academy management staff:

There exist several sport teams like football, basketball, and handball. Distinguished students are allowed to do the training in different national clubs in their spare time and are supported by the academy. A monthly sports festival is carried out by the academy in the vacation days (Saturday and Thursday) where the majority of students share in different teams and finally winning teams are gaining prizes. The teaching staff, dean, and vise dean share students in these sportive days such that students and their professors get the feeling of a cooperative family. Modern Academy is now in the initiative stage for preparation of all playgrounds required for building up its own sportive stadium.

== International programs ==
A cooperative scientific agreement between Modern Academy in Maadi and the University of the District of Columbia (UDC) in Washington, D.C. in the United States was established several years ago.

The Modern Academy for Engineering & Technology shared this agreement after several months of its establishment. This rapid approval from the USA's side was due to trust in the Engineering Academy's scientific altitude.

According to this agreement students of the Modern Academy for Engineering & Technology have the right to join the cooperative program after payment of an additional small registration fee.

A similar agreement is in its final stages for execution with the University of North London (UNL) in England. This will hand over advantages similar to those handed over by the UDC agreement.

29.9931°N 31.3125°E
