= Universities Ireland =

Higher education organisation in Ireland

- Formation: July 2003
- Headquarters: Centre for Cross Border Studies
- Location: Armagh, Northern Ireland
- President: Professor Ciarán Ó hÓgartaigh
- Website: https://universitiesireland.ie/

Universities Ireland is an organisation that promotes collaboration and co-operation between universities in both the Republic of Ireland and Northern Ireland. It was launched in July 2003 by the nine university presidents on the island of Ireland, with Professor Gerry McKenna, Vice Chancellor and President of the University of Ulster, as founding chair. It is funded by the member universities themselves; the Department of Education in the Republic of Ireland; the Department for Employment and Learning in Northern Ireland; and InterTradeIreland, an all-island body under the North/South Ministerial Council.

== Members of Universities Ireland ==
- Dublin City University
- Maynooth University
- Open University
- Queen's University Belfast
- Technological University Dublin
- Ulster University
- University College Cork
- University College Dublin
- University of Dublin
- University of Limerick
- University of Galway

== See also ==
- Irish Universities Association
- Universities UK
- List of higher education institutions in the Republic of Ireland
