= Streamstown, County Westmeath =

Streamstown Baile an tSrutháin
- Village
- Location in Ireland
- Coordinates: 53°26′29″N 7°34′33″W
- Country: Ireland
- Province: Leinster
- County: County Westmeath
- Elevation: 128 m (420 ft)

Population (2022)
  - Total: 519
- Time zone: UTC+0 (WET)
  - Summer (DST): UTC-1 (IST (WEST))
- Eircode routing key: N91
- Telephone area code: +353(0)90
- Irish Grid Reference: N282435

Streamstown (Irish: Baile an tSrutháin) is a village in County Westmeath, Ireland. It sits roughly 20 km from the county town of Mullingar. Streamstown was historically called Ballintruhan, which is an anglicisation of its Irish name.

The village is now in decline but once housed a thriving shop and post office, as well as a handball alley and pub. A motor garage was housed in a former blacksmith shop.

A horse named Streamstown competed in the 2002 Grand National Steeplechase, finishing in ninth place.

Streamstown railway station opened on 1 August 1851 and finally closed on 17 June 1963. Midland Great Western Railway from Athlone to Mullingar formed part of the main route between Dublin, County Galway and County Mayo until 1987, when Córas Iompair Éireann (CIÉ) closed the line and severing the rail link between Athlone and Mullingar. This section of rail line has since been developed into the Athlone to Mullingar Cycleway, which opened in October 2015.

Streamstown has a fox hunting club called the Streamstown Harriers, affiliated with the Irish Masters of Harriers Association.

== See also ==
- List of towns and villages in Ireland
