= Complex and Adaptive Systems Laboratory =

Irish research institute

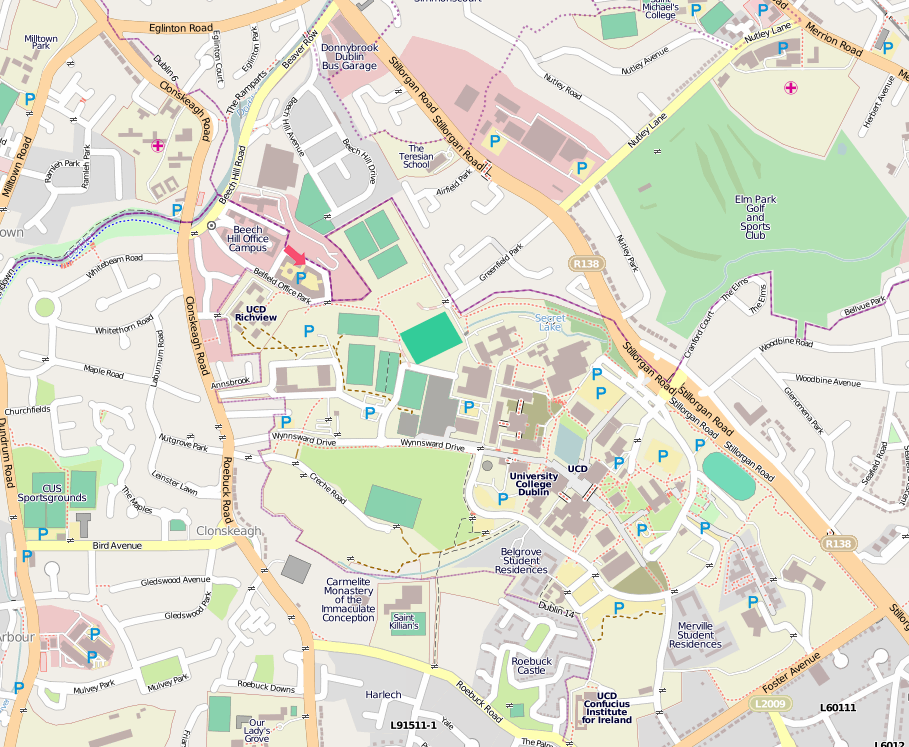
- Location of CASL (Marked by Red Arrow) from OSM
- Established: 2006
- Director: Mike O'Neill
- Faculty: ~30
- Staff: ~100
- Address: Belfield Business Park. Dublin 4.
- Location: Dublin, Ireland
- Coordinates: 53°18′30″N 6°13′25″W
- Interactive map of Complex and Adaptive Systems Laboratory
- Website: www.ucd.ie/casl

Complex and Adaptive Systems Laboratory (CASL) is an interdisciplinary research institute in University College Dublin. It is formed around four research clusters. The institute houses research groups from a number of Schools within UCD, notably computer science. It is located in the Belfield Business Park at the northern end of the main UCD campus. The institute is involved in all aspects of research into complex systems from atomistic models, through to societal modelling.

== Natural Computing and Optimisation ==
Led by Dr. Mike O'Neill this cluster studies computational systems inspired by the Natural World, including complex, physical, social and biological systems, and optimisation and model induction methods in their broader sense. The main facets of the cluster are: nature-inspired problem solving, understanding natural systems, exploiting natural processes as computational machines, and developing the next generation of optimisation and model induction methods. Groups in this cluster develop and apply methods to a broad range of problem domains including Finance, Computer Science, Design, Architecture, Music, Sound Synthesis, Bioinformatics, Engineering and Telecommunications.

== Networks and Data Analysis ==
The Networks and Data Analysis cluster is concerned with the analysis of complex data from and about networks. These networks may be social networks (in the broadest sense), biological networks, sensor networks or communications networks. The defining characteristic of the research in this cluster is the significance of the network structure in the data. The research concerns the discovery of interesting structure in the data and the fusion of data from different sources.

== Security and Trust ==
The Security and Trust cluster seeks to combine fundamental mathematics, computer science and engineering, with practical software engineering expertise and knowledge of human behaviour, to study problems in the areas of security and trust. Research topics include cryptography, security, privacy, trust, voting issues, information security, network coding and network information theory, watermarking, steganography, error correction, modulation, signal processing.

== Simulation Science and Extreme Events ==
This cluster aims to study and link the broad common underpinning causes of extreme weather, market crashes, social fads, and global epidemics using simulation science as the tool of discovery.

== Research Training ==
A number of structured PhD Programmes provide post-graduate education throughout the Institute:

- Simulation Science
- Bioinformatics and Systems Biology
- Complex Systems and Computational Social Sciences
- Mathematics, Coding, Cryptography and Information Security
- Innovation Policy for the Smart Economy
- Computational Infection Biology.
