= Alison Kitson =

British nurse

- Born: Northern Ireland
- Occupations: Chairperson, ILC Inc.
- Known for: Research on Nursing

Academic work
- Discipline: Nursing
- Sub-discipline: Implementation Science

Alison Kitson is a nurse and research scientist who co-founded the International Learning Collaborative (ILC) in 2009 to address foundational gaps in person-centered health care. She has served as the chair of the ILC since 2023.

== Professional life ==
Alison has worked as a senior executive and academic in nursing and health care in the UK and Australia. She has worked as a consultant for WHO Europe, and Middle East Regions during her time as Executive Professional Lead for Nursing at the Royal College of Nursing in the UK between 1990 - 2008. In Australia she was Dean of Nursing, Adelaide Nursing School University of Adelaide, South Australia from 2009–2017. She served as Vice President and Executive Dean of the College of Nursing and Health Sciences at Flinders University, South Australia from 2017–2024 and Foundation Director of the Caring Futures Institute at Flinders University from 2019-2024.

Alison is known for her work on developing, testing and refining the integrated Promoting Action on Research Implementation in Health Services Framework (or i-PARIHS Framework doi:10.1186/1748-5908-3-1). This implementation framework has been widely and successfully used globally to enable research evidence to be put into everyday practice in acute, sub-acute aged care and community care settings. She has published over 300 peer reviewed articles and book chapters in top nursing and translational science journals and is ranked in the top 2% of most cited researchers in her field in the world.

== Awards and honours ==
Alison Kitson holds honorary professorial appointments at the School of Clinical Nursing, Aalborg University, Denmark; School of Nursing and Health at University College Dublin, Ireland; the Australian Health Research Institute (AusHsi) Queensland University of Technology; and Sydney University School of Nursing. She is an associate research fellow at Green Templeton College, University of Oxford, England.

She has been awarded two honorary doctorates, one in 2013 from the University of Malmo, Sweden for her work on standards of nursing care and the other in 2023 from Aalborg University Denmark in recognition of her leadership around fundamentals of care. She is a fellow of the Royal College of Nursing (UK) (1991), the American Academy of Nursing (2011), and the Australian Academy of Health and Medical Sciences (2015). In 2022 she was awarded a Distinguished Matthew Flinders Professorship from Flinders University.

In 2025 she was inducted into the Sigma Theta Tau International (STTI) Research Hall of Fame for her research in care delivery. In 2025 she was invited to serve on the International Advisory Board of the Brain Heart Interconnectome led by the University of Ottawa as an implementation and research expert.

== Publications ==
As of October 2026, Kitson has over 350 academic and professional articles listed on Google Scholar which have been cited over 30,000 times giving her an h-index of 70.
