= List of Ulster University people =

This is a list of notable alumni and staff of Ulster University, and its predecessors, including the University of Ulster, New University of Ulster, Ulster Polytechnic, Belfast School of Art and Design and Magee College (asterisk * indicates deceased).

== Academics ==
Notable academics who have had positions at the university include:

- Antony Alcock, historian and Ulster Unionist politician
- Walter Allen (1911–1995), Professor of English, novelist and literary critic
- John Anderson, head of the School of Electrical and Mechanical Engineering and co-founder of HeartSine® Technologies Inc.
- Stephen William Boyd, Professor of Tourism
- Paul Carmichael, Professor of Public Policy and Government
- Brice Dickson, former Professor of Law; first Chief Commissioner of the Northern Ireland Human Rights Commission
- Deirdre Heenan, Professor of Social Policy
- John Loughlin, Emeritus Fellow, St Edmund's College, University of Cambridge
- Richard Lynn, former professor emeritus of psychology (title withdrawn)
- Declan McGonagle, Professor of Art; the only curator, to date, to be nominated for the Turner Prize (1987)
- Gerry McKenna, Dean of Science, Pro Vice Chancellor (Research), Vice Chancellor and President, University of Ulster; Senior Vice President, Royal Irish Academy
- Monica McWilliams, academic, peace activist, human rights defender and former politician
- Denis Moloney, lawyer
- Fabian Monds, BBC Governor with responsibility for Northern Ireland
- Brian Norton, president of Dublin Institute of Technology; solar energy technologist
- Kim L. O'Neill, professor of microbiology at Brigham Young University
- Neil Shawcross, artist and portrait painter
- James Simmons, poet
- Andrew Waterman, poet
- Robert Anthony Welch (1947–2014), literature, former dean of the faculty of arts

== Notable alumni ==
=== Academics ===
- Alison Kitson, nurse and academic
- Simon Kitson, historian
- Pat Loughrey, warden of Goldsmiths, University of London
- Gerry McKenna; Dean of Science, Pro Vice Chancellor (Research), Vice Chancellor and President, University of Ulster; Senior Vice President, Royal Irish Academy
- Calum Neill, psychoanalyst
- Steve Nimmons, information technologist and industry commentator
- Terri Scott, first female president of Institute of Technology, Sligo (ITS)
- Ailsa A. Welch, nutritional epidemiologist

=== Artists and photographers ===
- Arthur Armstrong (1924–1996), painter who worked in a Cubist style*
- Basil Blackshaw, artist, Royal Ulster Academy
- Doris Blair, artist
- Christine Borland, artist
- Muriel Brandt (1909–1981), painter of mural decorations, portraits and landscapes*
- John Byrne, performance and multimedia artist
- Duncan Campbell, nominated for the 2014 Turner Prize; 2008 winner of the Bâloise Prize
- William Conor (1881–1968), Belfast-born artist*
- Jack Coulter, artist
- Colin Davidson, artist, Royal Ulster Academy
- Willie Doherty, visual artist, twice nominated for the Turner Prize
- Micky Donnelly, painter
- Rita Duffy, artist

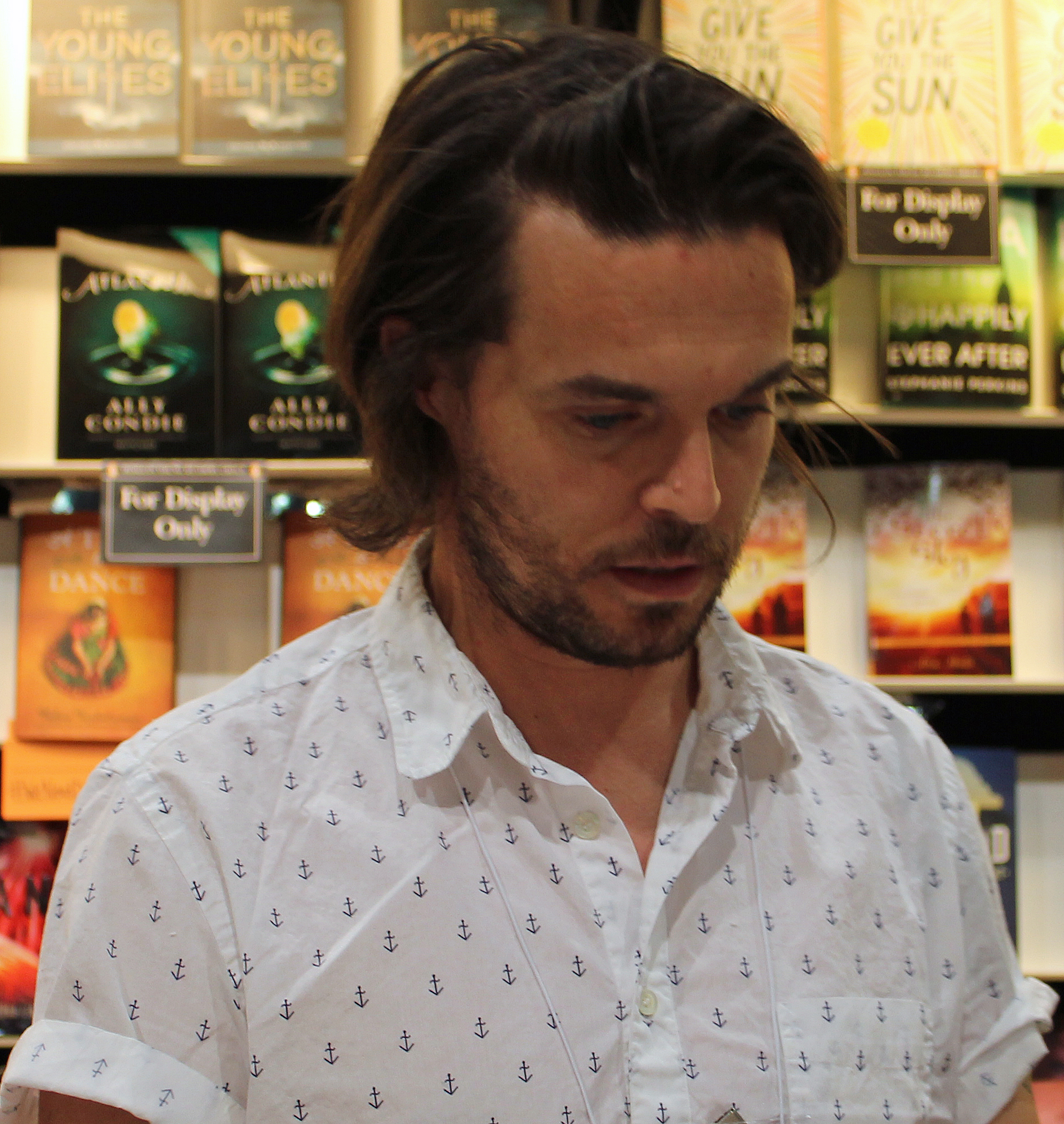
Oliver Jeffers

- Mary Fitzpatrick, photographer
- Rowel Friers (1920–1998), cartoonist, illustrator, painter and lithographer*
- Maurice Harron, sculptor
- Seán Hillen, artist whose work includes collages and the creative use of photographs
- Oliver Jeffers, artist, designer, illustrator and writer
- John Kindness, artist
- John Long, artist, painter, lecturer, member of the Royal Hibernian Academy
- John Luke, artist
- Gladys Maccabe, artist
- Mary McIntyre, artist and academic
- Eva McKee, craftswomen and designer
- Frank McKelvey (1895–1974), painter from Belfast*
- Colin Middleton (1910–1983), artist and surrealist*
- Claire Morgan, sculptor and artist
- Albert Morrow (1863–1927), illustrator, poster designer and cartoonist*
- Conor Murphy, Sinn Féin MLA
- Martin Parr, British photographer and former President of Magnum Photo Agency*
- Susan Philipsz, Scottish artist, winner of the 2010 Turner Prize
- Peter Richards, artist, curator and director of the Golden Thread Gallery in Belfast since 2002
- Markey Robinson (1918–1999), painter and sculptor*
- William Scott (1913–1989), artist*

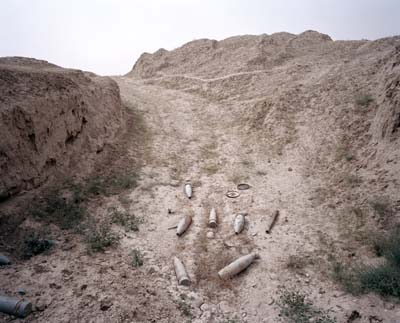
Paul Seawright's Valley, taken in Afghanistan in 2002. Courtesy Imperial War Museum, London.

- Paul Seawright, official war artist
- Dermot Seymour, artist; member of Aosdána
- David Sherry, artist
- Victor Sloan, artist
- Stephen Snoddy, gallery director
- Andre Stitt, artist, academic
- Cathy Wilkes, artist, 2008 Turner Prize nominee
- Ross Wilson, sculptor

=== Film and media ===
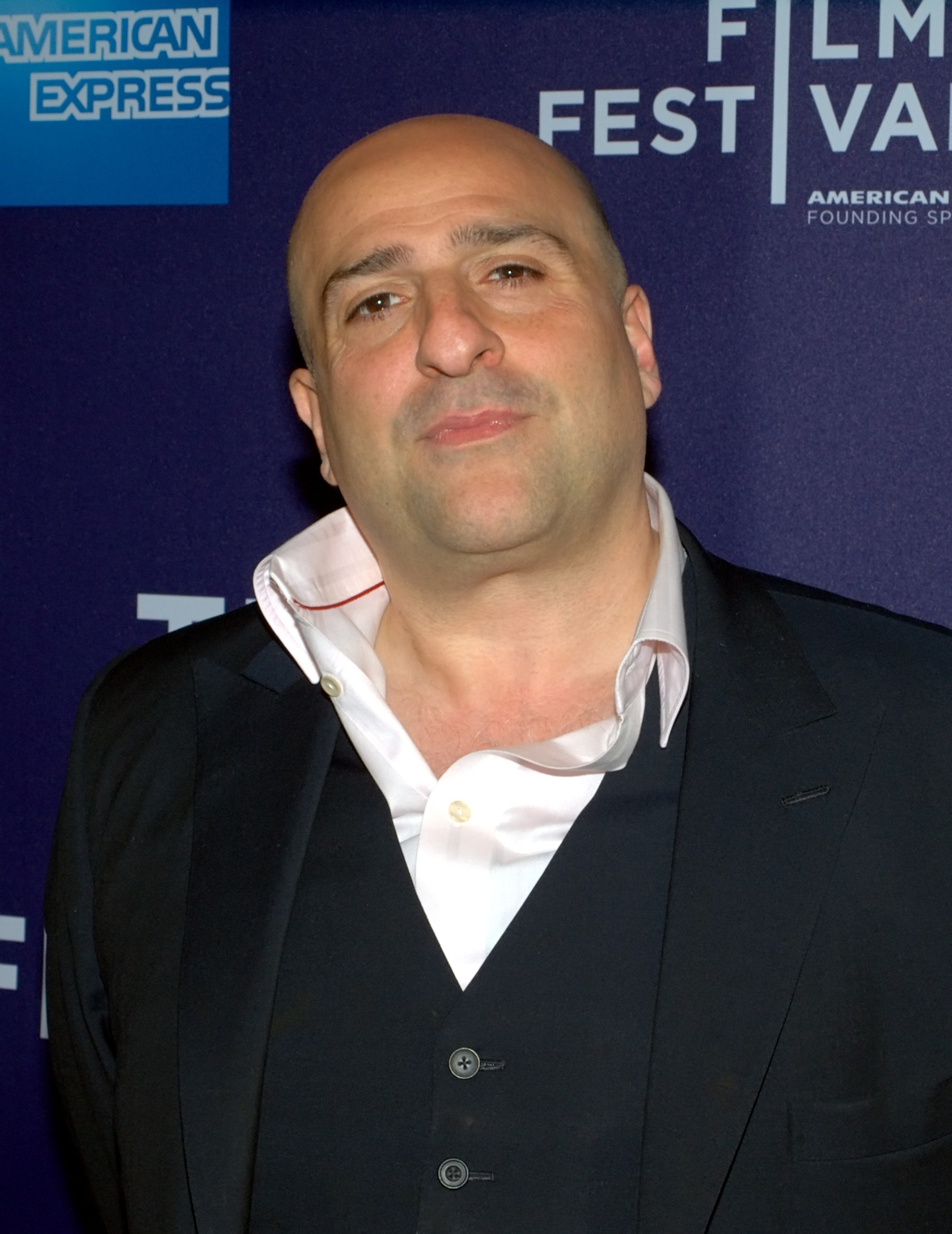
Omid Djalili, 2010 Tribeca TFF Shankbone

- Gerry Anderson, radio and television personality*
- Neil Brittain, television presenter and journalist, UTV
- Aidan Browne, television presenter; actor; senior lecturer in Performing Arts at the Belfast Metropolitan College
- Omid Djalili, comedian
- Stuart Graham, actor
- Martin O'Hagan (1950–2001), investigative journalist*
- Michael Riley, film producer and CEO of London-based production company Sterling Pictures
- Lalor Roddy, actor
- Caroline St John-Brooks (1947–2003), journalist and academic*
- Arshad Sharif, investigative journalist and anchor person

=== Music ===
- Michael Alcorn, composer and current Director of the School of Music and Sonic Arts at Queen's University Belfast
- David Holmes, DJ, musician and composer
- Brian Irvine, composer
- Gary Lightbody, singer, songwriter and frontman of Snow Patrol
- David Lyttle, musician, producer, songwriter, composer and record label owner
- Pádraigín Ní Uallacháin, Traditional Irish singer-songwriter
- Ian Wilson, composer

=== Politicians ===
- Eileen Bell, former MLA for North Down;Former Deputy Leader of the Alliance Party of Northern Ireland
- Roberta Carol Blackman-Woods, Labour Party, MP for City of Durham since 2005
- Dominic Bradley, Social Democratic and Labour Party (SDLP) MLA for Newry and Armagh
- Gregory Campbell, Democratic Unionist Party (DUP) MP for East Londonderry
- Gerry Carroll, People Before Profit (PBP) MLA for West Belfast
- John Dallat, SDLP, MLA and former Deputy Speaker of the Northern Ireland Assembly
- Mark Durkan, Former leader of the Social Democratic and Labour Party; Former Deputy First Minister of Northern Ireland
- Sean Farren, former SDLP MLA for North Antrim
- Michelle Gildernew, Sinn Féin, MP for Fermanagh and South Tyrone; former MLA and Minister of Agriculture Rural Development 2007-11 in the Northern Ireland Executive
- Paul Givan, DUP MLA for Lagan Valley since 2010; Former First Minister of Northern Ireland
- Kate Hoey, Labour Party, MP for Vauxhall
- Cecilia Keaveney, former Fianna Fáil politician; Teachta Dála (TD) for Donegal North-East, 1996–2007; Senator, 2007–2011
- Dolores Kelly, SDLP, MLA for Upper Bann since 2003; Deputy Leader of the SDLP since 2011
- Alban Maginness, SDLP, MP
- David McClarty, MLA, Independent Unionist; Former Deputy Speaker of the Northern Ireland Assembly
- Basil McCrea, leader of the Unionist Party NI21; member of the Northern Ireland Assembly
- Rebecca Ndjoze-Ojo, Namibian politician; SWAPO member of the National Assembly; Deputy Minister of Education since 2005
- Seán Neeson, former leader of the Alliance Party of Northern Ireland;Former member of the Northern Ireland Assembly
- Brian Ó Domhnaill, Fianna Fáil politician and member of Seanad Éireann since 2007
- Sandra Overend, Ulster Unionist Party MLA since 2011 for Mid. Ulster
- Jennifer Whitmore, Social Democrats TD since 2020 for Wicklow
- Sinéad Gibney, Social Democrats TD since 2024 for Dublin Rathdown

=== Religion ===
- Reverend James Alexander Hamilton Irwin
- Reverend Roy Magee (1930–2009), Presbyterian minister

=== Sport ===
- Fionnuala Carr, camogie player
- Jonathan Magee, academic and former footballer
- Brian Robinson, former Irish rugby union international player

=== Writers and poets ===
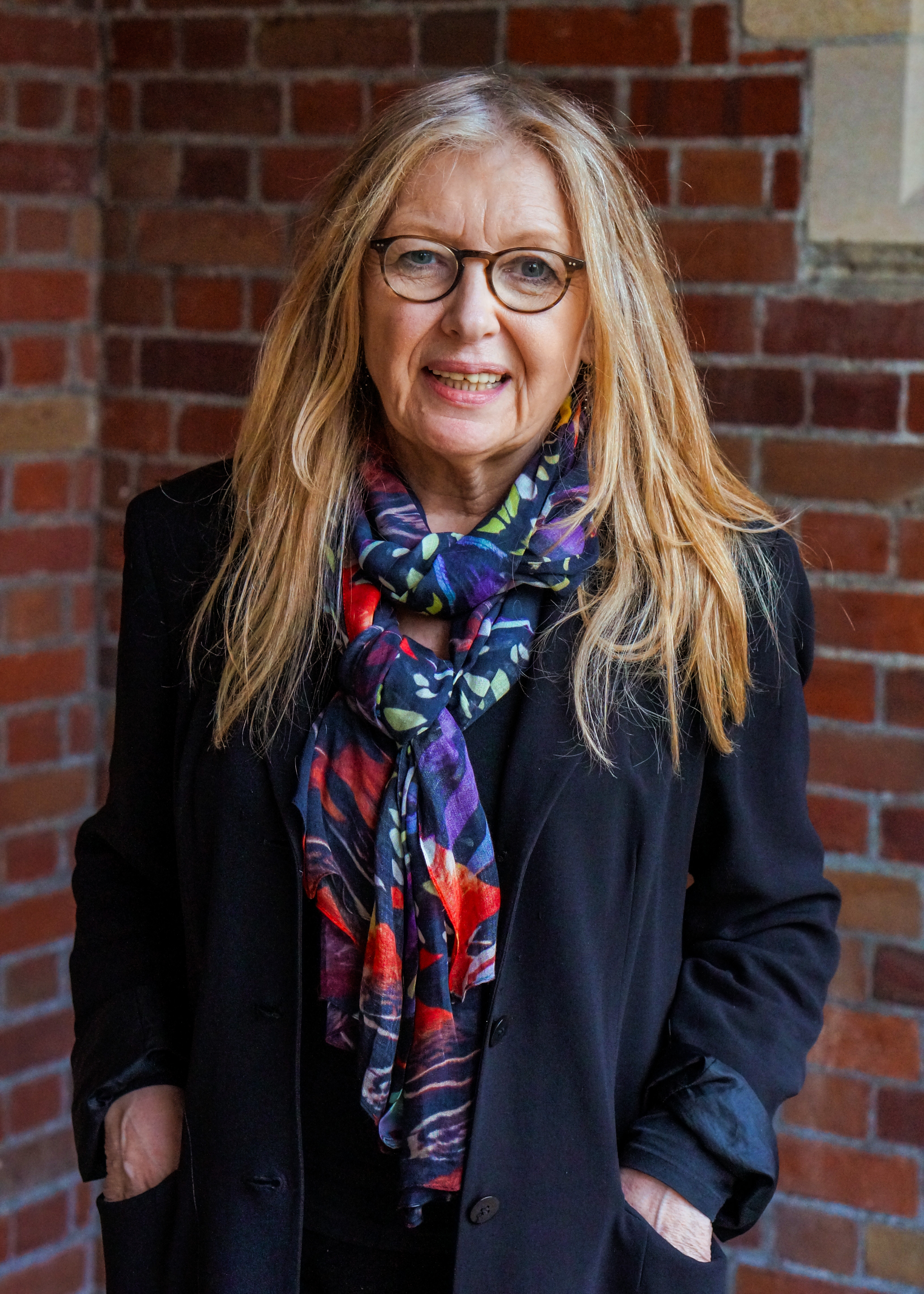
Anne Devlin

- Gerald Dawe, poet
- Anne Devlin, writer
- Colin Duriez, writer
- Brendan Hamill, poet and writer
- Brian Keenan, former hostage; writer
- Aodán Mac Póilin, writer
- Alastair McIntosh, Scottish writer, academic and activist
- Christina McKenna, author and painter
- Nigel McLoughlin, poet, editor and Professor of Creativity & Poetics at the University of Gloucestershire
- William Riches, political author and lecturer*

=== Other ===
- Seán Gallagher, entrepreneur, businessman
- Barbara Gray, senior police officer
- Seán O'Connor, businessman and political activist
- Stephen Martin (BSc 1988), former CEO of the Clugston Group, director general of the Institute of Directors
- Eileen O'Donnell, fashion model and pageant titleholder

== Honorary alumni ==
- Wendy Austin, broadcaster
- May Blood, Baroness Blood, community activist
- Paul Brady, musician, singer, songwriter
- Amanda Burton, actor
- Peter Canavan, Gaelic footballer
- Bill Clinton, former President of the United States
- Hillary Clinton, former US First Lady, former Secretary of State 2009–2013
- Evelyn Collins, Chief Executive, Equality Commission of Northern Ireland
- Seamus Deane, writer
- Adrian Dunbar, actor
- Joey Dunlop, motorcyclist* (awarded posthumously)
- Robert Dunlop, motorcyclist*
- Jonathan Edwards, Olympic gold medal winning and world record holding triple jumper
- Enya, born Eithne Ní Bhraonáin, singer
- Brian Friel, playwright*
- Harry Gregg, footballer
- Orla Guerin, journalist
- Seamus Heaney, poet and Nobel Laureate*
- John Hume, Nobel Peace prize co-recipient; former MP, MEP, MLA
- David Humphreys, Ulster and Ireland rugby union international
- Dame Geraldine Keegan, educationalist
- Brian Kerr, Baron Kerr of Tonaghmore, UK Supreme Court judge
- Tommy Makem, folk musician, artist, poet and storyteller*
- Inez McCormack, trade unionist and human rights activist*
- Graeme McDowell, professional golfer
- Ewan McGregor, actor
- Frank McGuinness, playwright
- Ian McKellen, actor
- Van Morrison, singer-songwriter
- Vincent O'Brien, racehorse trainer*
- Chris Patten, last Governor of Hong Kong and former MP
- Stephen Rea, actor
- Clare Short, MP
- Aung San Suu Kyi, Nobel Peace laureate and Burmese pro-democracy leader (awarded in absentia)
- Desmond Tutu, Nobel Laureate and Anglican Archbishop of Cape Town
- Margaret Ward, activist for female equality
