= Coleraine Cluster =

The Coleraine Cluster of poets and writers (a name coined later) was an informal collection of writers associated with the New University of Ulster in the early 1970s.

== Origins ==
The New University of Ulster had been established near the town of Coleraine about 60 miles from Belfast in 1968. The university had difficulty recruiting students and only reached an enrolment of about 1600 by 1975. However, it made some innovative appointments. The Department of English recruited the English literary critic Walter Allen who was appointed Professor of English Literature. He had already published several novels including All in a Lifetime (1959) and critical works including the renown The English Novel: A Short Critical History (1955) and Tradition and Dream: The English and American Novel from the Twenties to Our Time (1964). He joined Alan Warner, Professor of Anglo-Irish Literature, who moved from Magee College in Derry. They were joined by the poets James Simmons (editor of The Honest Ulsterman), Andrew Waterman, Bill McCormack and other writers and critics including Tony Bareham, Simon Gatrell, Mary Jones, Bridget O'Toole and the Russian scholar Michael Pursglove. Others who developed work in media and drama included Des Cranston, John Izod and Ken Ward.

This grouping drew several mature students from Belfast who had delayed their entry to university for various reasons. This included Gerald Dawe, Brian Keenan, Brendan Hamill, Anne Devlin, and Aodán Mac Póilin, the Irish language activist. To this group was added Michael Stephens (son of Robert Stephens and nephew of James Simmons) and, for a short period, Robert Johnstone. They were joined by writers from England including Colin Duriez, Peter Pegnall and Paul Wilkins.

All of these staff and students would go on to careers in writing.

== Activities ==
This cluster initiated a lively literary scene including regular poetry nights in local bars and more formal readings by such poets as Seamus Heaney and Derek Mahon. During this period, they also began to produce a range of publications including volumes of poetry. The cluster dissolved as the academic staff moved to other positions and the students graduated although its members continued to publish.

Various magazines were associated with members of the cluster. Acorn, the magazine of the English Society at Magee University College in Derry, was transferred to Coleraine in 1972 and then evolved into other magazines such as Quarto. During its lifetime Acorn published material by Walter Allen, Alan Warner, and Bill McCormack. Quarto published work by O'Toole, Waterman, Stephens, Pegnall and Wilkins.Caret was edited by Johnstone and others and published work by Simmons. The more established The Honest Ulsterman also published poetry by Simmons, Waterman, Dawe and Keenan about this time. Stephens guest edited an issue of The Honest Ulsterman in 1969 and had a poetry pamphlet published by it.

== Publications ==
During this period, staff associated with the cluster published several volumes of critical work: Warner published Clay is the word: Patrick Kavanagh, 1904-1967 in 1973 and Wareham and Gatrell published a bibliography of the poet George Crabbe in 1977. Several staff published books of poetry: Simmons published three volumes (Energy to Burn in 1971; The Long Summer Still to Come in 1973 and West Strand Visions in 1974), Waterman published Living Room in 1974, and McCormack (writing as Hugh Maxton) published The Noise of the Field in 1976. Pursglove published translations of the work of Andrei Platonov in 1975.

== Legacy ==
In the following decade all of these writers went on to greater success. Although not as formalised as the Belfast Group the people associated with the cluster supported each other during the early years of The Troubles in Northern Ireland. Living away from the centre of the Troubles in Belfast and without the constraints of a more established institution this group was able to build its own momentum.

Among staff, there was sustained literary output. Allen left in 1973 to take up various positions and continued to publish novels including Get out Early (Robert Hale, 1986) and Accosting Profiles (Robert Hale, 1989) as well as the autobiographical As I walked down New Grub Street. Memories of a Writing Life (Heinemann, 1981). Simmons published Judy Garland and the Cold War (Blackstaff, 1976), winner of the Cholmondeley Award, and Constantly Singing (Blackstaff, 1980) and several more volumes of poetry before retiring in 1984 and going on to establish an independent poetry school. Waterman, who retired to Norfolk in 1998, published From the Other Country (Carcanet Press, 1977), for which he received the Cholmondeley Award, and Over the Wall (Carcanet, 1980) and even more collections of poetry. McCormack published several volumes of poetry including At the Protestant Museum (Colin Smythe, 1986) and Jubilee for Renegades (Colin Smythe, 1982). He was later appointed Professor of Literary History at Goldsmiths, University of London and was elected to Aosdána. Jones published a novel titled Resistance (Blackstaff, 1980) which won the Welsh Arts Council Fiction Prize. O'Toole published a collection of short stories titled Miss Mulligan and Other Stories (Drumkeen, 2007). Gatrell went on to become Professor of English Literature at the University of Georgia and published a series of books on Thomas Hardy. Izod became Professor of Screen Analysis at the University of Stirling and published a series of books on the cinema.

Among the students, Dawe published the collection Sheltering Places in 1978 and other work subsequently. He then went on to establish and co-edit with Aodán Mac Póilin the literary journal Krino. They also co-edited a selection of the work of Padraic Fiacc. Dawe became Professor of English at Trinity College Dublin while Mac Póilin became Director of the ULTACH Trust and published several books on various aspects of the Irish language, literature and culture. Keenan worked for several years as a teacher and then went to Lebanon to work at the university in Beirut. He was captured and held hostage for four years. After his release he produced an award-winning account of his time being held hostage. Hamill published poems and reviews in several journals and had a poetry pamphlet published by Lagan Press which had been established by Dawe. Stephens became a Professor of English at Johnson & Wales University, Charlotte, North Carolina. Johnstone went on to co-establish Caret, a poetry magazine, and to co-edit several issues of The Honest Ulsterman and Fortnight (magazine). Duriez published extensively on C.S. Lewis and J.R. Tolkien. Pegnall published several books of poetry with Lapwing Publications and established a poetry festival in Portugal. Wilkins published poetry with Carcanet Press and won the Eric Gregory Award in 1978.
