= Padraic Fiacc =

Irish poet (1924–2019)

Padraic Fiacc (born Patrick Joseph O'Connor; 15 April 1924 – 21 January 2019) was an Irish poet. He was a member of Aosdána.

== Early life and education ==
Patrick Joseph O'Connor was born in Belfast to Bernard and Annie (née McGarry) O'Connor. He was the eldest of five children. His father was a bartender who left for the United States when Fiacc was very young. Fiacc resided with his maternal grandparents, who had recently moved to the Markets area of South Belfast after their home in Lisburn was burned by anti-Catholic rioters.

His family emigrated to the United States in 1929 and he grew up in Hell's Kitchen, New York City.

He attended Commerce High School and later transferred to Haaren High School to learn Latin. In 1937, he joined St. Joseph's Seraphic Seminary to train to become a priest and studied there until 1946; during this time he produced several original plays and his first collection of poetry titled Innisfail Lost. The poems were reviewed by Padraic Colum, who became a mentor to Fiacc. Colum directed him away from themes of immigration to America and encouraging him to write about Irish history. Fiacc had developed a distaste for America as well as a longing for Ireland as he dug deeper into its history and literary styles.

== Belfast and writing ==
Upon leaving the seminary, to avoid signing up for military service, he returned to Belfast in 1946. He lived there for four years. The multicultural influences as well as the poverty and violence of the neighbourhood impacted Fiacc's outlook and writing, especially his early work.

During this time his poetry was published in several magazines and the 1948 volume of New Irish Poets. Fiacc was the youngest poet in that edition. Publications of Fiacc's work from this time were found in Irish Bookman, The Irish Times, Poetry Ireland, and Rann.

In 1952, upon the death of his mother, Fiacc returned to New York to look after his father and his younger sister Mary. It was during this time that he met his soon-to-be wife Nancy, who had read and enjoyed some of his early writings in New Irish Poets (Devin-Adair, 1948). Fiacc returned to Belfast, marrying Nancy in Holy Cross church, Ardoyne, in 1956. They settled in Glengormley, a suburb six miles north of Belfast, where they had a baby girl in 1962. While there, Fiacc published his second collection of poetry By The Black Stream (Dolmen Press, 1969).

Odour of Blood, published by Goldsmith Press, followed in 1973. This was the first of many anti-war poems by Padraic Fiacc.

The Wearing of the Black (1974) was his edited collection of poetry by himself and his contemporaries, exploring issues of the conflict in Northern Ireland. The collection included poets from Ireland, the US, and the UK, of various ages, political backgrounds, and experiences: a bishop, teachers, academics, students, senior civil servant Norman Dugdale, established poets such as Seamus Heaney and Michael Longley; and young aspiring poets like Brendan Hamill and Gerard McLaughlin. Some felt threatened by The Wearing of the Black and tried to discredit Fiacc.

In the early 1970s, Fiacc met poet Gerald Dawe, with whom he then started correspondence. Dawe extolled Fiacc's work and introduced him to wider audiences, including his students at Trinity College Dublin. Many poets and writers visited Fiacc in his Glengormley home.

In 1981, Fiacc was elected to membership of Aosdána, the Irish arts academy. Also in the 1980s, Fiacc collaborated with artist Seamus Carmichael, who produced a series of colour prints based on Fiacc's anthologies. These images were widely exhibited in Ireland in 1985 and 1986.

Many artists and photographers have depicted Fiacc and his work, including Neil Shawcross, Dan Dowling, and John Minihan.

== Death ==
Padraic Fiacc died on 21 January 2019 in Belfast, Northern Ireland, aged 94.

A historical plaque in his memory was unveiled in Belfast in 2025.

== Books ==
- Woe to the Boy (1957)
- By the Black Stream (Dublin: Dolmen Press, 1969)
- Odour of Blood (Kildare: Goldsmith Press, 1973)
- Nights in the Bad Place (Belfast: Blackstaff Press, 1977)
- The Selected Padraic Fiacc ( Blackstaff Press, 1979)
- Missa Terriblis (Blackstaff Press, 1986)
- Ruined Pages: Selected Poems (edited by Gerald Dawe and Aodán Mac Póilin) (Belfast: Blackstaff Press, 1994)
- Semper Vacare (Belfast: Lagan Press, 1999)
- Red Earth (Lagan Press)
- The Wearing of the Black (as editor) (Blackstaff Press, 1974)
- Sea: Sixty Years of Poetry (edited and illustrated by Michael McKernon) (MH Press, 2006)
- In My Own Hand (edited and illustrated by Michael McKernon) (MH Press, 2012)
- A Review and Critical Analysis of SEA, Sixty Years of Poetry by Pádraic Fiacc (by Margaret C. Wright) (MH Press, 2020)
- tear the dead day back alive: Unpublished Poems of Pádraic Fiacc (edited by Michael McKernon and Fiona Gault) (MH Press, 2024)
- Turas Filiochta: Bilingual Poems of Padraic Fiacc (compiled and edited by Michael McKernon) (MH Press, 2024)

== Film and theatre ==
- Der Bomben Poet (film by Georg Stephan Troller, 1980)
- A Tribute To Poet Pádraic Fiacc (short film by Michael McKernon, 2006)
- STORMBIRD: Pádraic Fiacc in His Own Words, Poems and Images (cinematic theatre production by Michael McKernon, 2015)
- PADRAIC FIACC (short film by Michael McKernon, 2024)

== Honours ==
- AE Memorial Award (1957)
- Poetry Ireland Award (1981)
- Aosdána membership (1981)
- Blue plaque by the Ulster History Circle at Falls Road Library (2025)

== Reviews ==
- Murphy, Hayden (Spring 1980). Bold, Christine (ed.). "Review of The Selected Padraic Fiacc and The Wearing of the Black". Cencrastus (2): 47–49.
