= Brendan Hamill (writer) =

- Born: 1945 (age 80–81); Belfast, Northern Ireland
- Education: Ulster University
- Occupation: Teacher
- Writing career
- Genre: Irish literature

Brendan Hamill (born 1945, Belfast, Northern Ireland) is a poet and writer.

== Biography ==
Hamill was born and raised in the Falls Road area of Belfast, with his home on the Whiterock Road opposite Belfast City Cemetery. He attended St. Kevin's Primary School and then St. Thomas's Secondary School near Ballymurphy. At the latter school the headteacher was the writer Michael McLaverty. Many years later Hamill recalled his teaching: "Over and over again he explained the precise word, the need for feeling in the poetry. There would be no Sons And Lovers without feeling – the reading public would know it was fraudulent. The preachments were gentle but firm, reasonableness in all things." Another one of his teachers at the school was Seamus Heaney.

After finishing school, he worked for several years in England. He recalled: "A lot of my time was spent between the bookshops at Tottenham Court Road and Charing Cross at lunchtimes."

He then returned to Northern Ireland to study for a degree in English at the New University of Ulster. One of his lecturers was the critic Walter Allen. His fellow students included the poet Gerald Dawe and the writer Brian Keenan who were collectively known subsequently as the Coleraine Cluster. He was a cousin of the American journalist Pete Hamill.

After he graduated he subsequently worked for several years as a teacher in Kilcullen, County Kildare and later in Belfast.

== Work ==
He has published two poetry chapbooks - the first Emigrant Brother and the second Alameda Park.

His poetry has been published in a wide range of newspapers and magazines including Phoenix, Belfast Telegraph, Irish Times and the Irish Press, included in anthologies and read on both the BBC and RTÉ.

His critical work has been published in various magazines including Fortnight and Krino.

He was very enthusiastic about promoting the work of the poet Padraic Fiacc. He read at the Belfast literary festival celebrating poet Padraic Fiacc.

He spoke at the launch of ‘The Literature of the Troubles Project’.

== Works ==
=== Poetry ===
- Emigrant Brother, Lagan Press, Belfast, 1976
- Alameda Park, Glandore, Belfast, 2000
- Letter to America: poems on the 30 year war in N. Ireland, Glandore, 1998

=== Criticism ===
- "Brendan Hamill on Fiacc", Krino (Summer 1995).

=== Anthologies ===
- Laurel Holliday, ed. (1998). "Emigrant Brother". Children of the Troubles: Our Lives in the Crossfire of Northern Ireland. Simon and Schuster. ISBN 978-0-671-53738-8.
