= Verbal Arts Centre =

Educational charity based in Derry, Northern Ireland

Coordinates: 54°59′38″N 7°19′31″W

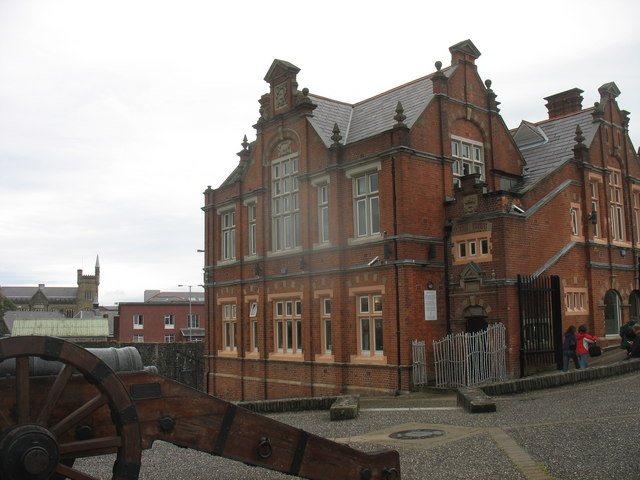
Verbal Arts Centre building

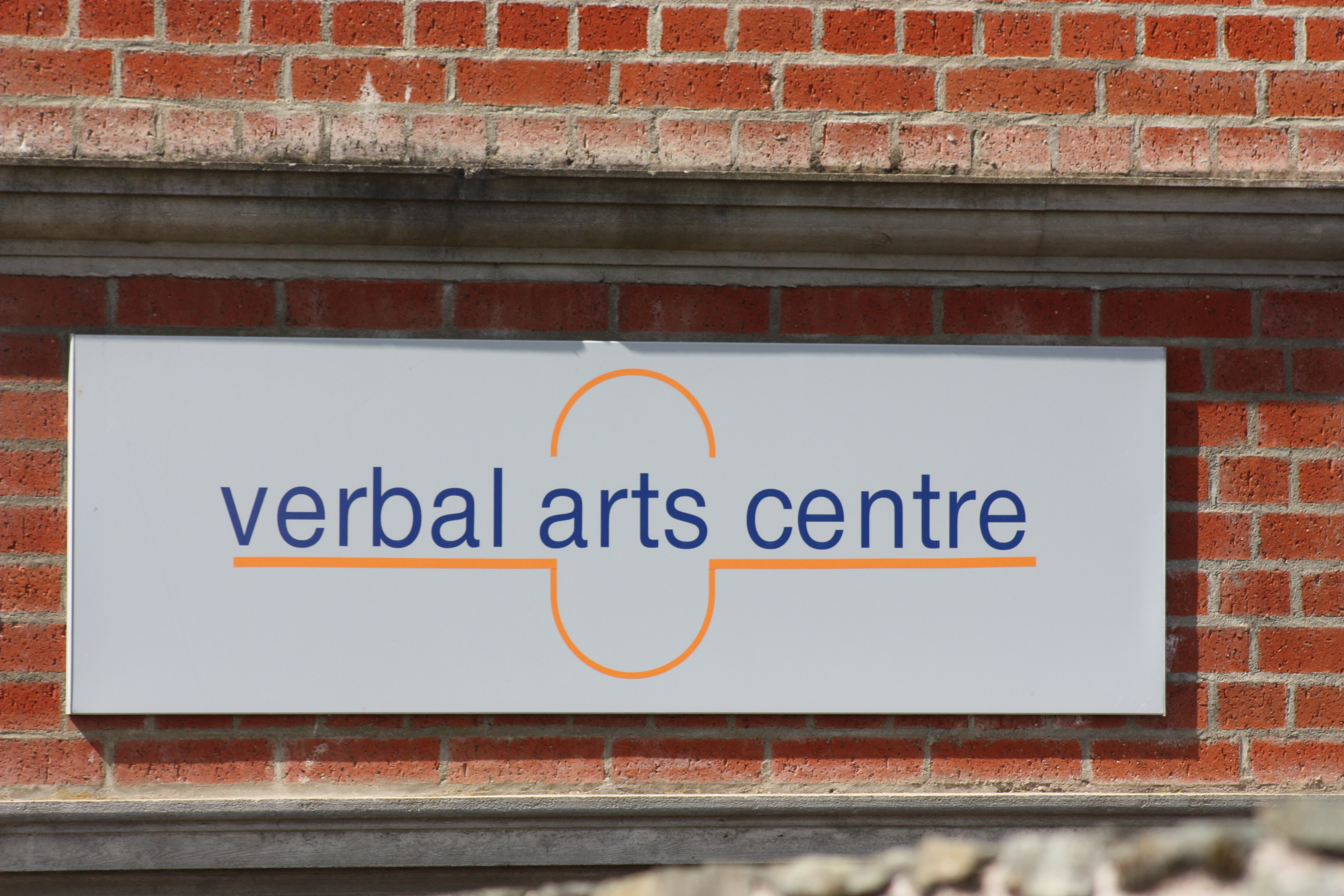
Verbal Arts Centre signage, August 2009

The Verbal Arts Centre is based in Derry, Northern Ireland, and is a centre for the development of the verbal arts and literacy (i.e. the ability to read, write, communicate and comprehend). It was established in 1992 as an educational charity. In 2000 it moved to the First Derry School, a listed building.

The project's goal is to promote the written and spoken word and is also involved in research and the publication and provision of information, including material for schools. It has also developed literacy building programmes for schools, works on literary heritage, storytelling and works also with youth and community groups throughout the north-west. The centre coordinates an annual comic book festival, the "2D Festival". It also promotes verbal arts events.

The centre hosts a readers circle and children's book club. The centre houses a number of arts and crafts pieces, including works by Louis le Brocquy and John Behan.

In 2013, VAC absorbed Lagan Press, an independent arts publisher founded c. 1990 by poet Gerald Dawe and Fortnight magazine manager Patrick Ramsey.
