= Paul Carmichael (academic) =

Political and social scientist

Paul Carmichael FAcSS SFHEA PGCHE
- Born: Kingston upon Hull, England
- Occupations: Professor of Public Policy and Government

Academic background
- Education: University of Strathclyde (PhD); Leeds Beckett University (BA)

Academic work
- Discipline: Political Scientist
- Institutions: Ulster University

Paul Carmichael is a British political scientist and professor of public policy and government at Ulster University, Carmichael has been teaching at the university since 1992. In 2004 Carmichael was appointed as a professor at the university teaching Public Policy & Government.

== Education ==
Carmichael attended the polytechnic Leeds Beckett University in Leeds, UK from 1986 to 1989, where he obtained an undergraduate degree in Economics and Public Policy. He later attended the University of Glasgow from 1989 to 1991 where he was awarded a PhD in Public Policy.

== Career and research ==
Carmichael was initially made a lecturer at Ulster in 1992. Later he was appointed as a senior lecturer, then reader, and finally professor in 2004. He has held various administrative roles within the university throughout his tenure including Head of the School of Criminology, Politics and Social Policy and Dean of the Faculty of Social Sciences.

=== Publications ===
Carmichael has authored and co-authored ten books. The first Introduction (2003) where he penned a chapter "Regulating Local Authorities". The second Decentralizing the Civil Service (2003). The third, Central Grants and Local Spending in Britain (2003). The fourth The Review of Public Administration (2007), within which he wrote a chapter on "Devolution and Constitutional Change in Northern Ireland". The fifth Introduction to Devolution (2007). The sixth Devolution and Constitutional Change in Northern Ireland (2007). The seventh Contested Britain (2020). The eighth Regulating Local Authorities (2021) which focuses on the relationships between government and local authorities and the role each of them play in governance and the powers they exercise. The ninth a chapter in Unions, Break-ups and Special Relationships (2022). Most recently, the tenth Devolution in the UK (2023), which he co-authored with Deirdre Heenan who is also a lecturer at Ulster University.

=== Honours ===
- 2000: Visiting Fellow at the Centre for British Studies at the Humboldt University of Berlin
- 2007: Fellow of the Academy of Social Sciences
- 2016: Senior Fellow of the Higher Education Academy
- 2021: Fellow of the Joint University Council of the United Kingdom
- Fellow of the UK Association of Public Administration
