= Loth Loriën =

Three-masted schooner built in 1907

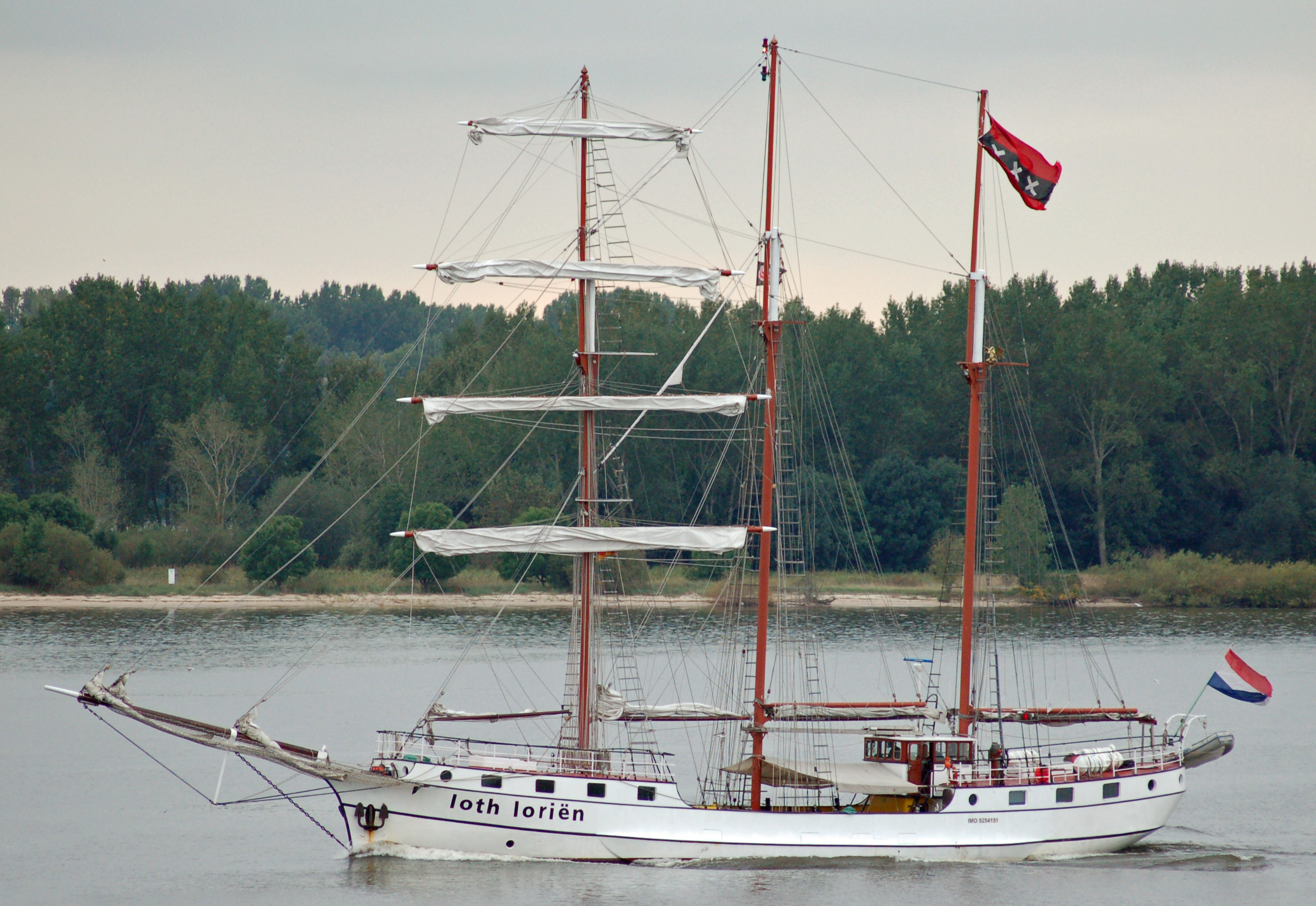
- Loth Loriën on the river Elbe near Wedel, Germany

History

Norway
- Name: Njord or Njørd
- Port of registry: Ålesund
- Builder: Mjellem & Karlsen shipyard, Bergen, Norway
- Yard number: 33
- Launched: 1907
- Fate: Converted to a staysail ketch in 1989, converted to a barquentine in 2008

Netherlands
- Name: Loth Loriën
- Namesake: Fictional forest
- Owner: Jaap van der Rest
- Operator: Van der Rest Sail Charter
- Port of registry: Amsterdam
- Acquired: 1989
- Identification: IMO number: 5254151; MMSI number: 245994000; Callsign: PFPF
- Status: Active As of 2023

General characteristics
- Type: barquentine
- Tonnage: 158 GT
- Length: 48.0 m (157 ft 6 in) (overall)
- Beam: 7.6 m (24 ft 11 in)
- Height: 31 m (101 ft 8 in) (main mast)
- Draught: 3.7 m (12 ft 2 in)
- Propulsion: Deutz diesel engine; 360 hp (270 kW)
- Sail plan: Sail Area: 500 m^{2} (5,400 sq ft)
- Speed: 15 kn (27 km/h)
- Capacity: 90 day guests, 36 persons long trips; 9 cabins
- Crew: 10

Loth Loriën is a three-masted barquentine active as a sailing charter ship mostly in the Baltic Sea around Germany and Denmark in Northern Europe.

== History as a fishing vessel ==
The ship was built in 1907 by the Norwegian shipyard Mjellem & Karlsen in Bergen and was named Njørd. It was delivered as a lugger for herring fishing in July 1907, commissioned by P. Th. Sandborg A/S from Ålesund. Originally Njørd was 28.83 metres (94 ft 7 in) long, 5.79 metres (19 ft 0 in) wide and had a side height of 2.80 metres (9 ft 2 in). The fishing vessel measured at 109 gross register tons (GRT), had a compound steam engine manufactured by the shipyard with an output of 14 horsepower (10 kW) and schooner sailplan.

In 1930 the ship was lengthened to 32.58 meters, with the measurements increasing to 130 GRT. From 1931 B. Runde's company A/S Njørd in Ålesund operated the ship. In the early 1950s the steam engine was replaced by an eight-cylinder four-stroke diesel engine manufactured in 1946 from Blackstone with an output of 288 hp (215 kW). The following decade the ship changed owner a couple of times and in 1962 the ship was foreclosed by Statens Fiskarbank and in August 1963 it was sold again. Two years later, Njørd received a five-cylinder Alpha Diesel creating 425 hp (317 kW) as the main engine. In 1974 it was sold to Vedavågen and was used as a trawler. Later in the 1970s the ship was laid up, and in 1982 the ship was sold to Teunis R. Danker of Puttershoek in the Netherlands.

== Conversion to a classic sailing ship ==
Around 1989 the current owner took over the ship and had it converted to a staysail ketch and renamed her to Loth Loriën. Since then the ship has been rebuilt several times. In 1992 another conversion took place, with more modern rigging and new interior fittings, and has since then been used as a sail charter ship. In 2001/2002 the hull was lengthened again and the ship was converted into a three-masted gaff schooner. In 2008/2009 it was converted to a barquentine.

The ship is operated by Van der Rest Sail Charter which also have the ship J.R. Tolkien. For day trips Loth Loriën can accommodate up to 90 passengers. Cabins for up to 36 persons are available for weekend or longer sailing trips. The saloon seats 50 people. The crew lets interested fellow passengers actively participate in sailing tasks if they wish.

== See also ==
- Lothlórien
- J.R.R. Tolkien

== Gallery ==
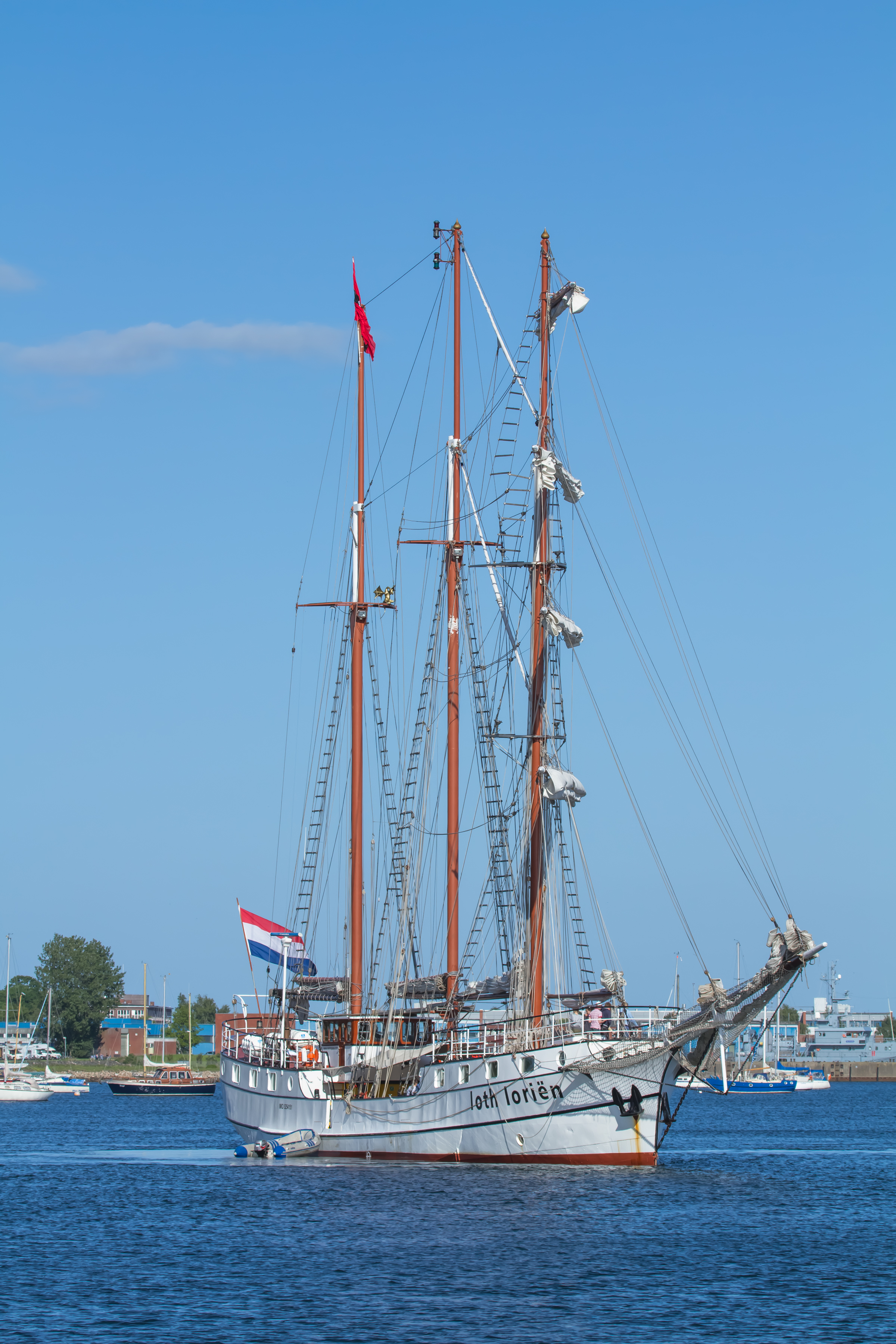

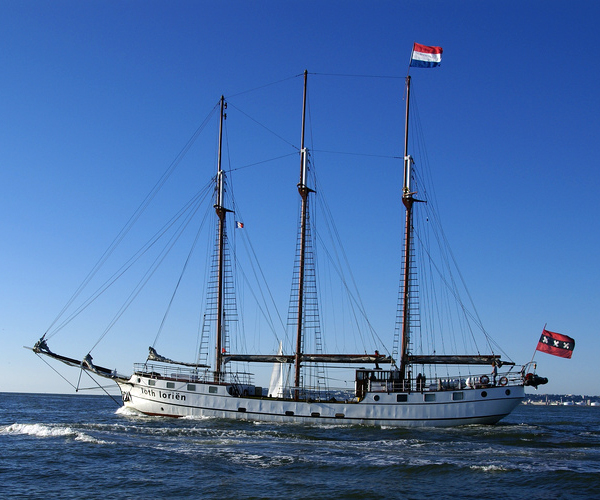

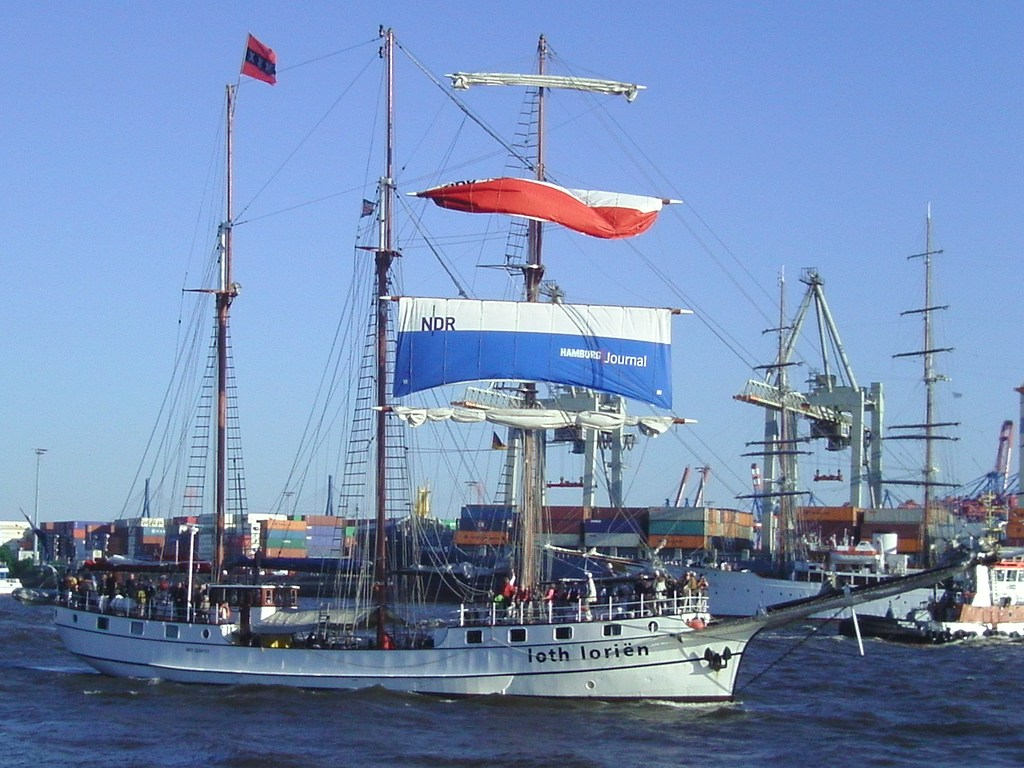

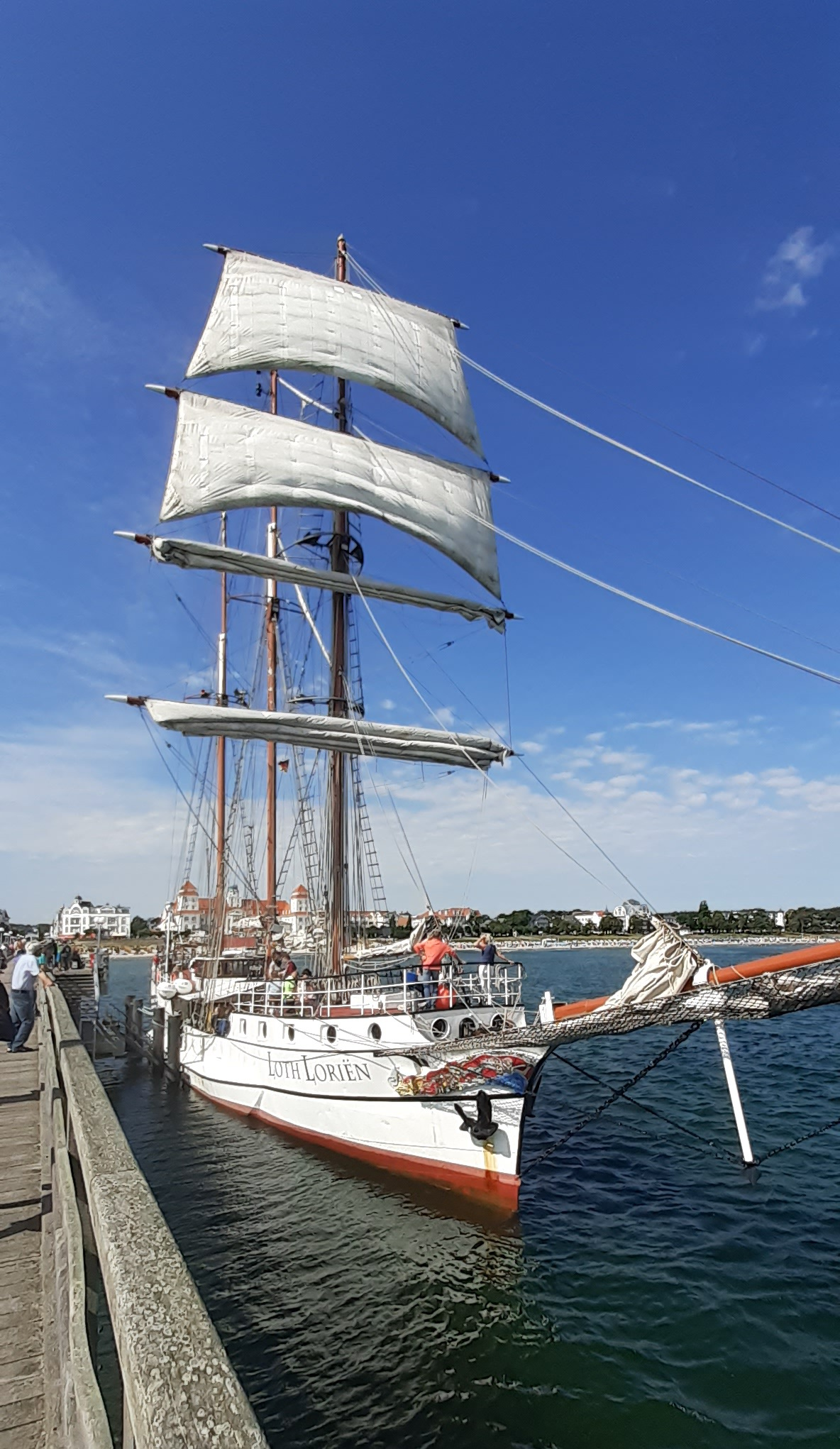
Loth Lorien at the Binz pier, on Rügen, Germany
