= Orangefield High School =

Secondary school in Belfast, Northern Ireland

Orangefield High School was a secondary school in east Belfast, Northern Ireland. Formerly Orangefield Boys' Secondary School and Orangefield Girls' Secondary School, it became coeducational before it closed in 2014.

Notable alumni of the Boys' School include Van Morrison, Brian Keenan, David Ervine, Gerald Dawe, Walter Ellis, Eric Bell and Ronnie Bunting.

Prior to closure, Orangefield High School had a student population of approximately 240 pupils from age 11 to 18. The school offered a wide range of compulsory subjects such as English, Mathematics, Science that were required through years 8–12. The school also offered other subjects such as technology and design, home economics, information computer technology, media, music, geography, history, business studies, physical education and religious education.

In October 2012, it was announced that the school might close, due to student numbers falling and failure to meet academic targets. The school's closure was confirmed in January 2014. The school closed in June 2014 and was demolished by February 2017. Plans for the school's site are still unknown.

Prior to the school's demolition it was used as a film set for BBC drama The Fall in 2016.

== History ==
Orangefield has had a long history within the east Belfast community, with many local celebrities and international icons having been educated at the school. The most famous former student is Van Morrison. Morrison wrote a song entitled "Orangefield" and included it on his 1989 album Avalon Sunset. He also referred to his school days in Orangefield in the songs "Got To Go Back" (on his 1986 album No Guru, No Method, No Teacher) and "On Hyndford Street" (on his 1991 album Hymns to the Silence).

John Malone was the headmaster of Orangefield Boys Secondary School from when it opened in 1957 to the early 1970s.

== Location ==
Some of the older school buildings were still in use until its closure, although the original boys' school building was used only for physical education lessons. The new buildings added throughout the years have brought together the girls' and boys' schools with additional add-ons such as a dedicated science wing (built in 1991) and a reception area. The school shares the area with other local schools Grosvenor Grammar School and Orangefield Primary School.

== Principals & vice-principals ==
- John (Boots) Malone / Brian Weston
- Brian Weston / Ken Stanley
- William Hyndman / Jennifer Mussen
- Karen Burrell / Maurice Johnston

== School houses (boys) ==
There were four school houses during the period to 1974 (linked to local businesses with respective colours):

- Davidson (red) – Davidson Sirocco Work
- Hughes (blue) – Hughes Tool Company
- Musgrave (green) – replaced by McNeill House after the Musgrave company went bankrupt, and became Stewart House in the early 1980s
- Bryson (yellow) – Spence Bryson (Carpet makers)

== Gender integration ==
From 1972 onwards, girls from 6th and Upper 6th girls' school shared classes with the boys' school and vice versa. Lessons in the boys' school were undertaken in what was known as the 'new' block.

== See also ==
- Orangefield Old Boys F.C.

== Sources ==
- Turner, Steve (1993). Too Late to Stop Now, Viking Penguin, ISBN 0-670-85147-7
