= Calum Neill =

Calum Neill is Professor of Psychoanalysis and Continental Philosophy at Edinburgh Napier University in Edinburgh, Scotland. He is editor of the Palgrave Lacan Series and the author of Without Ground: Lacanian Ethics and the Assumption of Subjectivity, Ethics and Psychology: Beyond Codes of Practice and Jacques Lacan: The Basics. Along with Derek Hook and Stijn Vanhuele, he edited the four volumes of Reading Lacan's Ecrits.
