= Aidan Browne =

Northern Irish television presenter

Aidan Browne (b. Belfast) is a Northern Irish television presenter and actor.

== Broadcasting career ==
Browne has been a freelance continuity announcer and newsreader at UTV since 1993. He also contributes regularly to Ivan Martin's Sunday Brunch programme on U105 discussing television programmes for the week ahead.

== Personal life ==
As well as his announcing role, Browne is a senior lecturer in Performing Arts at the Belfast Metropolitan College (formerly the Belfast Institute of Further and Higher Education). He is also involved with Youth Lyric; as a tutor since 1986 and as Director of the group since 1993.

Browne previously studied at Lancaster University, the University of Ulster, the Guildhall School of Music and Drama and the London Academy of Music and Dramatic Art. He is married and has two children.
