= Belfast Metropolitan College =

Education institution in Belfast, Northern Ireland

Coordinates: 54.594°N 5.933°W

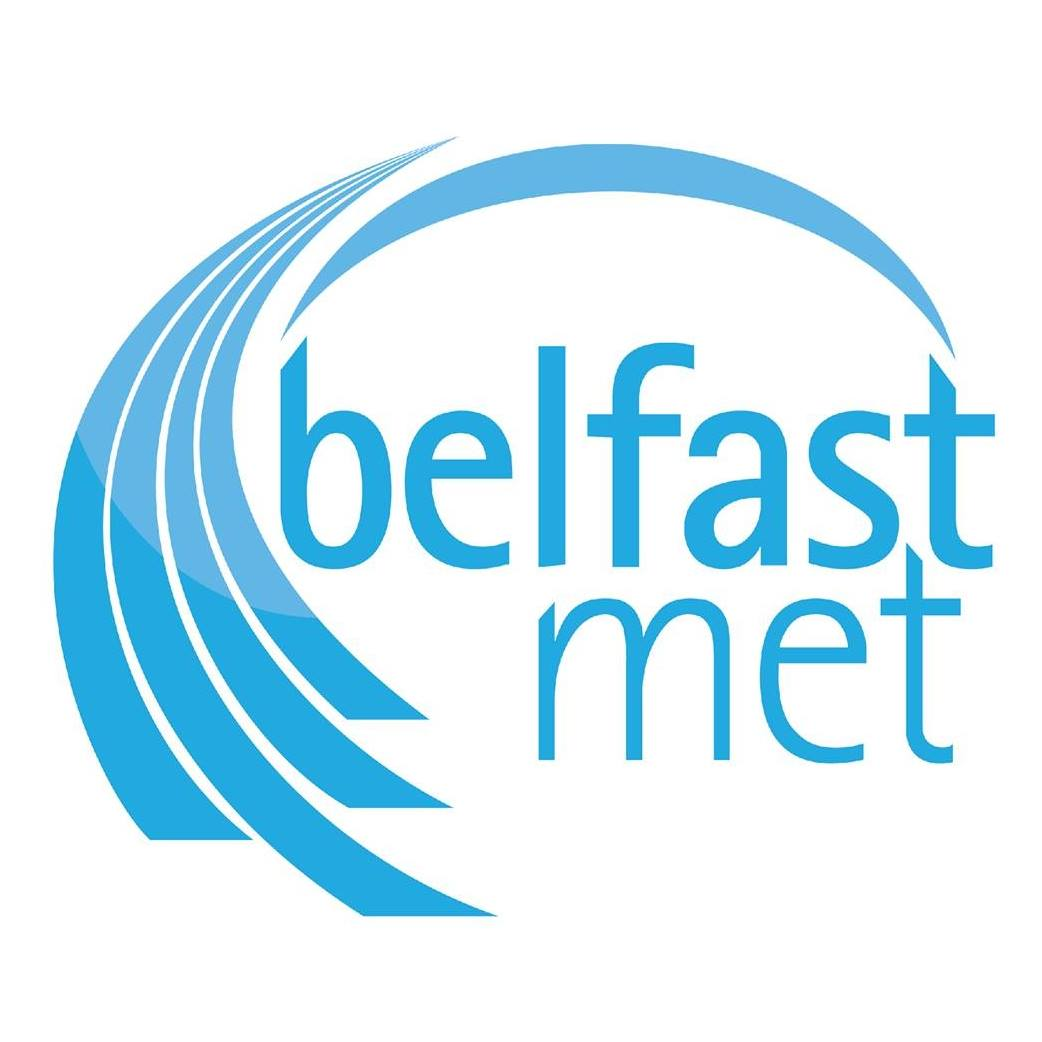

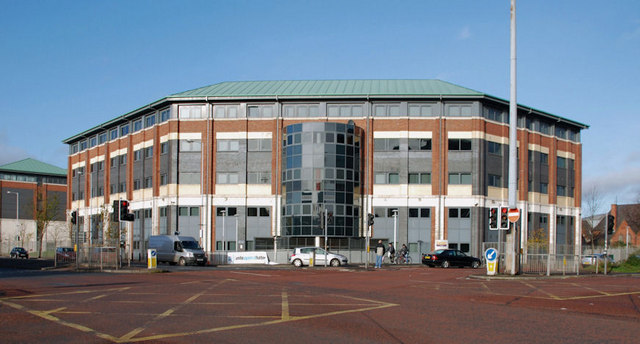
- Belfast Metropolitan College, Millfield

Location
- 125–153 Millfield; Belfast, County Antrim, BT1 1HS; Northern Ireland

Information
- Other name: Belfast Met
- Former name: Belfast Institute of Further and Higher Education
- Type: Further Education & Higher Education
- Motto: Outstanding learning for successful futures
- Established: 2007 (roots from 1884/1906)
- Principal & CEO: Louise Warde Hunter
- Staff: 1,114
- Age range: 16+
- Enrolment: 37,000
- Campus size: 3 main campuses
- Colours: Blue and white
- Website: www.belfastmet.ac.uk

Belfast Metropolitan College, also known as Belfast Met, is a further and higher education institution in Belfast, Northern Ireland. The college offers both vocational education and academic qualifications. With over 37,000 enrolments and an annual budget in the region of £60 million, it is the largest FE college in the UK and the fourth largest post-secondary institution in the UK.

== History ==
Belfast Technical School opened its doors on 11 February 1884 by the Belfast Corporation on Hastings Street (now the site of Millfield Campus). It was chiefly funded by the Worshipful Company of Drapers. The Technical Instruction Act 1889 empowered the corporation to aid technical instruction out of the rates. However, there was still a shortfall and with the creation of the City Council of Belfast in 1898 and the Agriculture and Technical Instruction (Ireland) Act 1899, the Belfast Technical School Committee was dissolved in November 1900 and responsibility was devolved upon the city council and the Department of Agricultural and Technical Instruction, thus plans began for a new technical college beside RBAI.

Construction for Belfast Municipal Technical Institute began in 1902 and was officially opened in 1906. It was in a grand building in College Square East.

College Square East survived the Belfast blitz with students often having to hide in its air-raid shelters during the Second World War.

College Square East was known colloquially as the 'Black Man Tech'. The official name of the college was the Municipal Technical College however it was also known as 'The Tech' and the 'Black Man Tech'. It is often incorrectly perceived that the title ‘Black Man’ comes from the statue of Dr Henry Cooke which currently stands outside the building. However, interestingly, the name 'Black Man' dates back further than Dr Cooke (leader of Belfast's Evangelical Presbyterians). The original statue on the site and the first public statue in Belfast, was erected in 1855 to commemorate Fredrick Richard, Earl of Belfast (his courtesy title as heir to the 3rd Marquis of Donegall). The statue was dark bronze and some say that it was later painted black due to weathering making it look rather mottled. Soon it was known as ‘THE BLACK MAN’ and became one of Belfast's best loved rendezvous spots and noted landmarks in the City. Twenty years later the statue was removed and replaced by that of Dr Henry Cooke. It was taken to the Town Hall Victoria Street and in 1906 removed to the City Hall where it still stands inside the building. It is very common to acquire an affectionate name and in Belfast the 'Black Man' would have been perceived as a place, not a person, where people met and not after the ‘green statue’ of Dr Cooke.

Other specialist colleges were subsequently established in the city including Stanhope Street, Rupert Stanley, and the College of Business Studies in Brunswick Street. In the early 1990s, these colleges amalgamated as the Belfast Institute of Further and Higher Education which in turn merged with Castlereagh College to form the current Belfast Metropolitan College in 2007.

In September 2011, Belfast Met opened a new £211 million campus in Titanic Quarter. It was officially opened by Princess Anne on 10 November 2011. Michael D Higgins visited several months later.

== Campuses ==
Belfast Met has four campuses; Titanic Quarter, Millfied, Castlereagh and Springvale e3 - with Titanic Quarter campus serving as the main campus of the college.

The city centre campuses at Brunswick Street and College Square East were sold when the Titanic Quarter campus opened in 2011. College Square East was made into student accommodation in 2016 at a cost of £16 million, but it retains its exterior appearance due to being a listed building.

== Academic courses ==
Belfast Met offers both leisure courses and courses leading to qualifications. Courses leading to a qualification are offered at ISCED Level 1 - Level 6 (Only one Level 7 course is offered).

Below is a list of subject areas courses are offered in: (Note: Courses may have different names and several courses may exist within each subject area - some categories may be missing or redundant, due to new and old courses. Course list correct as of January 2026.)

Millfield

Courses	Notes
Access to University	
A-Levels	
Art and Graphic Design	
Building trades	
Child Care	
Counselling	
Engineering	
GCSEs	
Health & Social Care	
Media	
Music	
Sport	
Support Learning	

Castlereagh

Courses	Notes
Biology	
Child Care	
Computing	
Electronic Security	
Fashion	
Health & Social Care	
Motor Vehicle	
Tourism	

Titanic Quarter

Courses	Notes
Access to University	
A-Levels	
Animal Care	
Beauty	
Business & Administration	
Computing	
Dental Nursing	
ESOL	
Esports	
Fashion	
GCSEs	
Science	

Springvale e3

Courses	Notes
Business & Administration	
Hospitality	
Journalism	
Retail and Sales	

== Leadership ==
Louise Warde Hunter, the former Deputy Secretary of the Northern Ireland Civil Service, became Principal and CEO of Belfast Met in April 2020. She replaced Marie-Thérèse McGivern who had been the Principal and Chief Executive of Belfast Met since 2009.

== Awards ==
In April 2020, Belfast Met received the Queen's Anniversary Prize – a UK-wide award recognising excellence, innovation and public benefit in work carried out by UK colleges and universities.

== Alumni ==
- Danny Blanchflower, footballer
- William Blease, Baron Blease
- Aidan Browne, television presenter and actor
- Lynda Bryans, television presenter
- Eamonn Holmes, TV personality
- John Irvine, newsreader
- Brian Keenan, writer
- Colin Morgan, actor
- Kerri Quinn, actress and singer
- Joseph Tomelty, actor and playwright
- Aidan Walsh, Olympic Boxer – Tokyo 2020 bronze medallist
- Mark Gray Film & TV Drone Pilot & Videographer
