= Kim L. O'Neill =

Irish biologist

Kim L. O'Neill is the developer of a monoclonal antibody that allows for the accurate, cheap and easy detection of cancer.

O'Neill has a B.Sc. degree from New University of Ulster and a Ph.D. from the University of Ulster. He is a full professor of microbiology at Brigham Young University. In 1998 research by O'Neill suggested a link between caffeine and the formation of some cancers.
