= ULTACH Trust =

Voluntary Irish language promotion body, Northern Ireland

ULTACH Trust Iontaobhas ULTACH
- Formation: 1989
- Founder: Aodán Mac Póilin
- Type: Gaelic in Ulster; Gaelic culture
- Headquarters: Belfast
- Website: ultach.org

The ULTACH Trust (Irish: Iontaobhas ULTACH) is a charitable trust established in 1989 aimed at promoting the Irish language in Northern Ireland. Its former director was Aodán Mac Póilin and is now Róise Ní Bhaoill.

== Name ==
The word Ultach means 'person from Ulster' but in the case of the organisation it is also a backronym for 'Ulster Language, Traditions And Cultural Heritage', therefore the organisation's title appears in capital letters.

== History ==
The principal aim of the organisation is to promote the Irish language throughout the entire community of Northern Ireland. A core objective is to encourage cross-community involvement in the language, and the membership of the Board of Trustees reflects both major religious traditions. The offices of ULTACH are also located in 'neutral' Belfast city centre to facilitate visits by members of all sections of the community.

Originally supported by both the Central Community Relations Unit, a branch of the Department of Finance and Personnel in Northern Ireland, and by the Department of Community, Rural and Gaeltacht Affairs in the Republic of Ireland, the Trust is currently core-funded by Foras na Gaeilge, the Irish-language agency of The North/South Language Body.

The Trust was for some time the only dedicated Irish language funding body in Northern Ireland. Since 1990, the organisation has distributed approximately £1.5 million in grant-aid to hundreds of Irish language projects. Approximately 50% of this funding was allocated to the Irish-medium education sector, and most of the rest was used to support the voluntary sector.

As a consequence of the Good Friday Agreement of 1998, structural changes were implemented to support the Irish language in Northern Ireland. The Trust now tends to concentrate its resources on in-house projects and partnerships with other organisations rather than grants. The following list summarises the Trust's current key areas of activity: engaging in cross-community work; developing learning resources; forming strategic partnerships with relevant community, research, educational and statutory agencies; advising government and statutory agencies on language planning and policy issues; campaigning for the establishment of an Irish-language broadcasting sector in Northern Ireland; publishing material on the Irish language and related issues; working towards an effective Irish language arts policy for Northern Ireland; initiating innovative language projects; and funding Irish language projects.

== Irish in Northern Ireland ==
The Irish language can be a controversial and contentious issue in Northern Ireland. Through its cross-community work, the Trust seeks to stimulate interest in Irish across the political and religious divide, and to provide opportunities to learn and use the language in areas and among communities which are not normally associated with it.

The experiences of contemporary Protestant learners of the language are recorded on the website. Some of the results of this research are available on-line at the trust's website. Other board and staff members have explored the hidden tradition of Protestant involvement with Irish in the past. The Trust seeks to identify obstacles to Protestant and unionist engagement with the language and to raise awareness within the Catholic and nationalist community to the difficulties experienced by learners from other traditions.

== Projects ==
In its work in developing learning resources, the Trust was involved in the development of Now You’re Talking, the first multi-media Irish language teaching pack to use the Ulster dialect. The 30 half-hour television programmes have been shown on BBC, RTÉ, TG4 and Channel 4. The Trust is now attempting to secure copyright for the course to ensure its continued publication. The Trust commissioned and published, in conjunction with the Gaeltacht authority, Údarás na Gaeltachta, two volumes of Abair Leat!, a guide for teachers of adult learners of Irish. ULTACH staff also produce Taisce Focal, a learners' supplement for the on-line Irish language magazine BEO! . This series aims to expose intermediate and advanced learners to the natural colloquial Irish of the Gaeltacht. In response to numerous requests, the Trust has published a selection of these articles in book form, with two accompanying CDs.

Through lectures, conferences, articles, reports, submissions to statutory bodies and occasional publications, the Trust has sought to stimulate debate on a number of topics. These have included themes such as education, cross-community access, cultural politics, history, Irish language arts, and cultural links with Gaelic Scotland.

The Trust is particularly active in the area of Irish-medium broadcasting and has been campaigning to persuade the arts establishment to provide adequate funding, support and evaluative structures for Irish language arts in Northern Ireland.

== See also ==
- Columba Project
