= Brian Keenan (writer) =

Irish writer

Brian Keenan CBE
- Born: 28 September 1950 (age 75); Belfast, Northern Ireland
- Education: Orangefield School
- Alma mater: University of Ulster
- Spouse: Audrey Doyle
- Relatives: Elaine Spence and Brenda Gillham
- Writing career
- Subject: His time as a hostage
- Notable work: An Evil Cradling

Brian Keenan CBE (born 28 September 1950) is an Irish writer whose work includes the book An Evil Cradling, an account of the four and a half years he spent as a hostage in Beirut, Lebanon from 11 April 1986 to 24 August 1990.

== Life ==
Keenan was born into a working-class family in East Belfast, Northern Ireland, in 1950. He left Orangefield School early and began work as a heating engineer. However, he continued an interest in literature by attending night classes and in 1970 gained a place at the University of Ulster in Coleraine. Other writers there at that time included Gerald Dawe and Brendan Hamill who were collectively known subsequently as the Coleraine Cluster. In the mid 1980s Keenan returned to the Magee College campus of the university for postgraduate study. Afterwards he accepted a teaching position at the American University of Beirut, where he worked for about four months.

== Hostage ==
On the morning of 11 April 1986, Keenan was kidnapped by Islamic Jihad. After spending two months in isolation, he was moved to a cell shared with the British journalist John McCarthy. He was kept blindfolded throughout most of his ordeal and was chained hand and foot when he was taken out of solitary.

The British and American governments at the time had a policy that they would not negotiate with terrorists, and Keenan was considered by some to have been ignored by them. Because he was travelling on both Irish and British passports, the Irish government made numerous diplomatic representations for his release, working closely with the Iranian government. Throughout the kidnap they also provided support to his two sisters, Elaine Spence and Brenda Gillham, who were spearheading the campaign for Brian's release. He was released from captivity to Syrian military forces on 24 August 1990 and was driven to Damascus. There he was handed over by the Syrian Foreign Ministry to the care of Irish Ambassador, Declan Connolly. His sisters were flown by Irish military executive jet to Damascus to meet him and bring him home to Northern Ireland.

In 1993, he married Audrey Doyle, a physiotherapist. They have two children and live in Dublin.

He returned to Beirut in 2007 for the first time since being released 17 years earlier. He wrote of the trip, "I couldn’t say I was happy and excited to be back – it was far more than that. I was falling in love."

== Works ==
An Evil Cradling is an autobiographical book by Keenan about his four years as a hostage in Beirut. The book revolves heavily around the great friendship he experienced with fellow hostage John McCarthy, and the brutality that was inflicted upon them by their captors. It was the 1991 winner of the Irish Times Literature Prize for Non-fiction and the Christopher Ewart-Biggs Memorial Prize.

It was also enthusiastically reviewed. Sebastian Faulks in the Independent on Sunday said "The scope and grandeur of his reflections is supported by the concrete detail of his narrative. It is a moving and remarkable triumph." In the Irish Times, Frank McGuinness claimed that "From the horror has come something wonderful. An Evil Cradling is a great book... With the publication of An Evil Cradling, Brian Keenan is not letting the world forget. This is a mighty achievement by a magnificent writer". The Observer called it "Scriptural in its resonances and its broad artistry, while being as gripping as an airport thriller" and John Simpson stated that it was "Unforgettable... a remarkable achievement"

An Evil Cradling was adapted into a 2003 film, Blind Flight.

== Bibliography ==
- An Evil Cradling, 1991
- Turlough, 1996
- Between Extremes: A Journey beyond Imagination (With J. McCarthy) 2000
- Four Quarters of Light: A Journey through Alaska, 2004
- I'll Tell Me Ma, 2010

== See also ==
- List of kidnappings
- List of Northern Irish writers
- List of solved missing person cases: 1950–1999
