= Aodán Mac Póilin =

Irish language activist

- Born: 11 October 1948; Belfast
- Died: 29 December 2016 (aged 68); Belfast
- Education: Ulster University
- Occupations: Writer, teacher
- Known for: Irish-language activist

Aodán Mac Póilin (11 October 1948 – 29 December 2016) was an Irish language activist in Northern Ireland.

== Background ==
Aodán Mac Póilin was born in Belfast and grew up in Norfolk Road in the Andersonstown area. His father worked as a civil servant and his mother was an Irish language speaker and grew up speaking the language at home. He had two sisters.

He was one of the early students at the New University of Ulster (1970-1974) which had recently opened at Coleraine. There he was associated with the Coleraine Cluster of poets and writers. He graduated with a BA(Hons) in Irish studies. He later obtained an MPhil on modern literature in Irish.

On returning to Belfast he helped to establish the Shaw's Road Irish-speaking community where he and his wife Áine lived.

== Career ==
After graduation, Mac Póilin was a teacher for a period and then became Director of the ULTACH Trust in 1990.

He was active in the European Bureau for Lesser-Used Languages and the Community Relations Council for Northern Ireland, and was chairman of the first Irish-medium school in Northern Ireland.

Mac Póilin served on the board of Northern Ireland Screen for 5 years from 2012, with particular responsibility for the Irish Language Broadcast Fund. He also served on the boards of the Columba Initiative, Comhairle na Gaelscolaíochta (the Council for Irish-medium Education), the Education Broadcasting Council of BBC Northern Ireland, Foras na Gaeilge (the cross-border Irish language implementation body), and the Seamus Heaney Centre for Poetry, Queen's University Belfast.

Mac Póilin wrote and lectured extensively on various aspects of the Irish language, literature and culture. He made a major contribution to the revitalisation of the Irish language in Northern Ireland.

Mac Póilin died on 29 December 2016. He is survived by his wife Áine, daughter Aoife, and two grandchildren.

== Legacy ==
A film entitled Rian na gCos celebrating his life was released on BBC Two NI in 2020 and on TG4 in 2021.

In 2017, the Irish Language Broadcast Fund established a bursary fund in his name entitled Ciste Cuimhneacháin Aodáin Mhic Phóilin.

== Books ==
- Styles of Belonging: the cultural identities of Ulster (co-editor with Jean Lundy); 1992
- Ruined Pages, New Selected Poems of Padraic Fiacc (co-editor with Gerald Dawe); Blackstaff Press 1994 (ISBN 978-0-85640-529-7)
- Irish Language in Northern Ireland (editor); Iontaobhas Ultach, 1997 (ISBN 978-0-9516466-3-2)
- The Great Book of Gaelic (2002) (member of the editorial panel)
- Our Tangled Speech, Essays on Language and Culture; Ulster Historical Foundation, 2018 (ISBN 978-1-909556-67-6)
