= Anne Devlin (writer) =

British writer

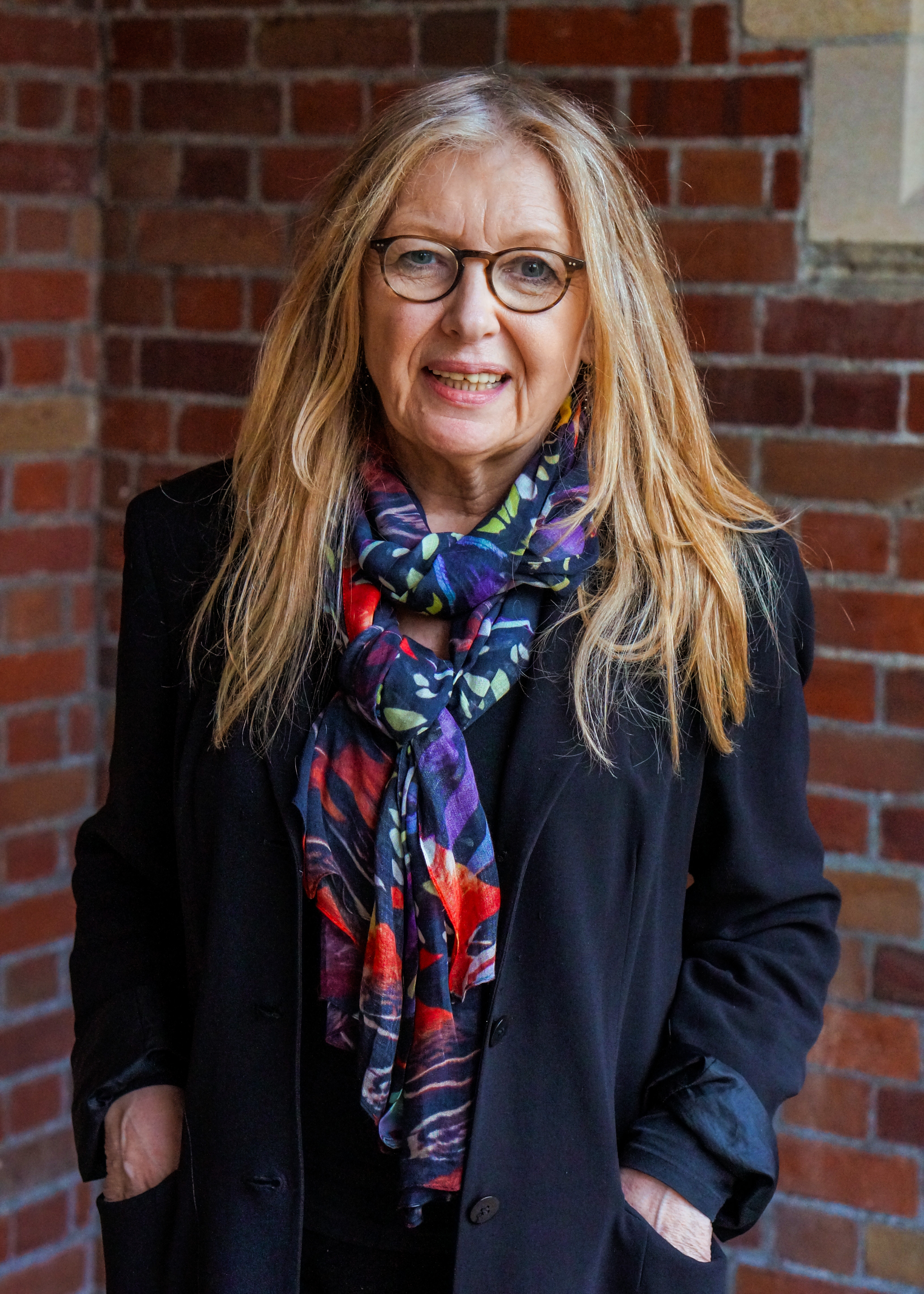
Anne Devlin

Anne Devlin (born 13 September 1951) is a short story writer, playwright and screenwriter born in Belfast, Northern Ireland. She was a teacher from 1974 to 1978, and started writing fiction in 1976 in Germany. Having lived in London for a decade, she returned to Belfast in 2007.

She is the daughter of Paddy Devlin, a Northern Ireland Labour Party (NILP) Member of the Parliament of Northern Ireland and later a founding member of the Social Democratic and Labour Party (SDLP). She was raised in Belfast. In January 1969, while a student at the New University of Ulster, Devlin joined a civil rights march from Belfast to Derry, organised by the People's Democracy. At Burntollet Bridge, a few miles from Derry, the march was attacked by loyalists. Devlin was struck on the head, knocked unconscious, fell into the river, and was brought to hospital suffering from concussion. The march was echoed in her 1994 play After Easter. At university, Devlin was briefly associated with the Coleraine Cluster of poets and writers before leaving Northern Ireland to work as a teacher in Germany.

She then moved to England where she established a career in television and radio. She was visiting lecturer in playwriting at the University of Birmingham in 1987, and a writer in residence at Lund University, Sweden, in 1990.

== Publications ==
- 1988 - The Rainbow
- 1992 - Wuthering Heights
- 1999 - Titanic Town (Faber & Faber)

== Awards ==
- 1992 - Hennessy Literary Award for short stories
- 1985 - Samuel Beckett Award for TV Drama
