= J.R. Tolkien (schooner) =

Schooner built in 1963

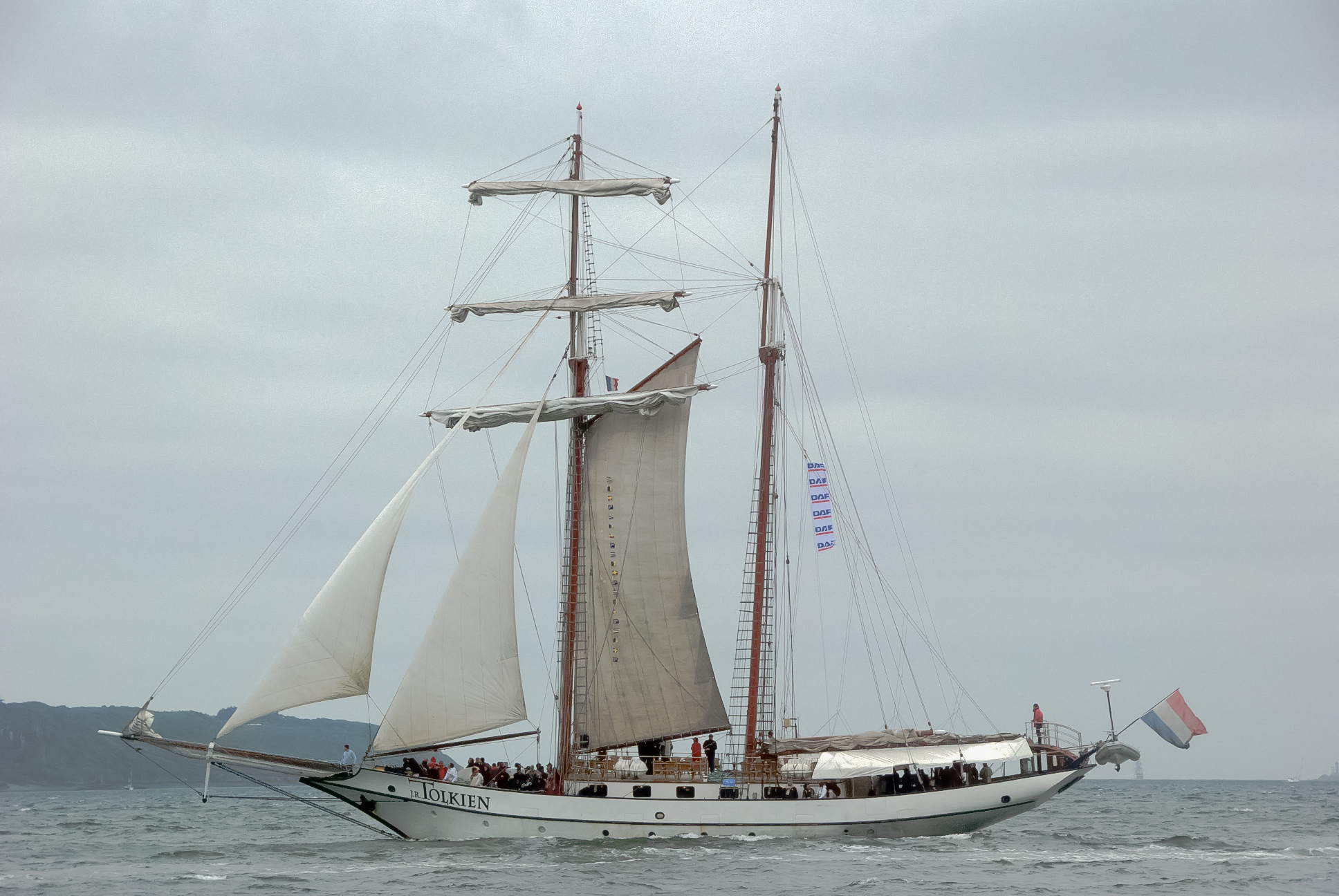
- J.R. Tolkien off Brest, France, in 2013

History

East Germany
- Name: Dierkow
- Port of registry: Rostock
- Builder: Edgar-André-Werft, Magdeburg
- Launched: 1963
- Notes: Converted to a topsail schooner, 1994

Netherlands
- Name: J.R. Tolkien
- Namesake: J. R. R. Tolkien
- Operator: Van der Rest Sail Charter
- Port of registry: Amsterdam
- Acquired: 1994
- Identification: IMO number: 7017064; MMSI number: 244496000; Callsign: PFRB
- Status: Active

General characteristics
- Type: Topsail schooner
- Tonnage: 139 GRT
- Length: 41.7 m (137 ft) (overall); 36 m (118 ft) (deck); 31 m (102 ft) (waterline)
- Beam: 7.8 m (26 ft)
- Height: 32 m (105 ft) (main mast)
- Draught: 3.2 m (10 ft)
- Propulsion: Caterpillar diesel engine; 365 hp (272 kW)
- Sail plan: Sail Area: 628 m^{2} (6,760 sq ft)
- Speed: 11.5 kn (21.3 km/h)
- Capacity: 90 guests; 10 three berth & 1 two berth cabins
- Crew: 10

J.R. Tolkien is a gaff-topsail schooner of Netherlands registry used for passenger cruises on the Baltic Sea and elsewhere in European waters.

Originally named Dierkow, the vessel was built in 1964 as a seagoing diesel-electric tug at the Edgar-André-Werft in Magdeburg, East Germany. As a tug Dierkow was employed in freight transportation under East German registry from the Baltic port of Rostock.

In 1994 Dierkow was acquired by the Van der Rest family for conversion to a topsail schooner with auxiliary propulsion for passenger cruising. Undergoing conversion at Rotterdam between 1995 and 1998, the craft was placed in Netherlands registry at Amsterdam and was renamed J.R. Tolkien in honor of the British author J.R.R. Tolkien.

As a schooner J.R. Tolkien is a topsail-rigged vessel of 139 tons and measures 36m in hull length (41.7m overall) with a beam of 7.8m and draft of 3.2m. Two 32m masts carry a sail area of 628 square meters. Auxiliary propulsion is supplied by a Caterpillar engine of 365 horsepower.

J.R. Tolkien carries a crew of 10 with 20 to 90 passengers on a day sail or up to 32 passengers on weekends or longer cruises. Accommodations include 11 cabins (ten with three berths, one with two berths) with separate shower and WC. The main salon can seat 50 persons for dinner. J.R. Tolkien is operated by Van der Rest Sail Charter, who also operate the barquentine Loth Loriën.

== See also ==
- List of schooners
- J.R.R. Tolkien
- Loth Loriën (barquentine)

== Gallery ==
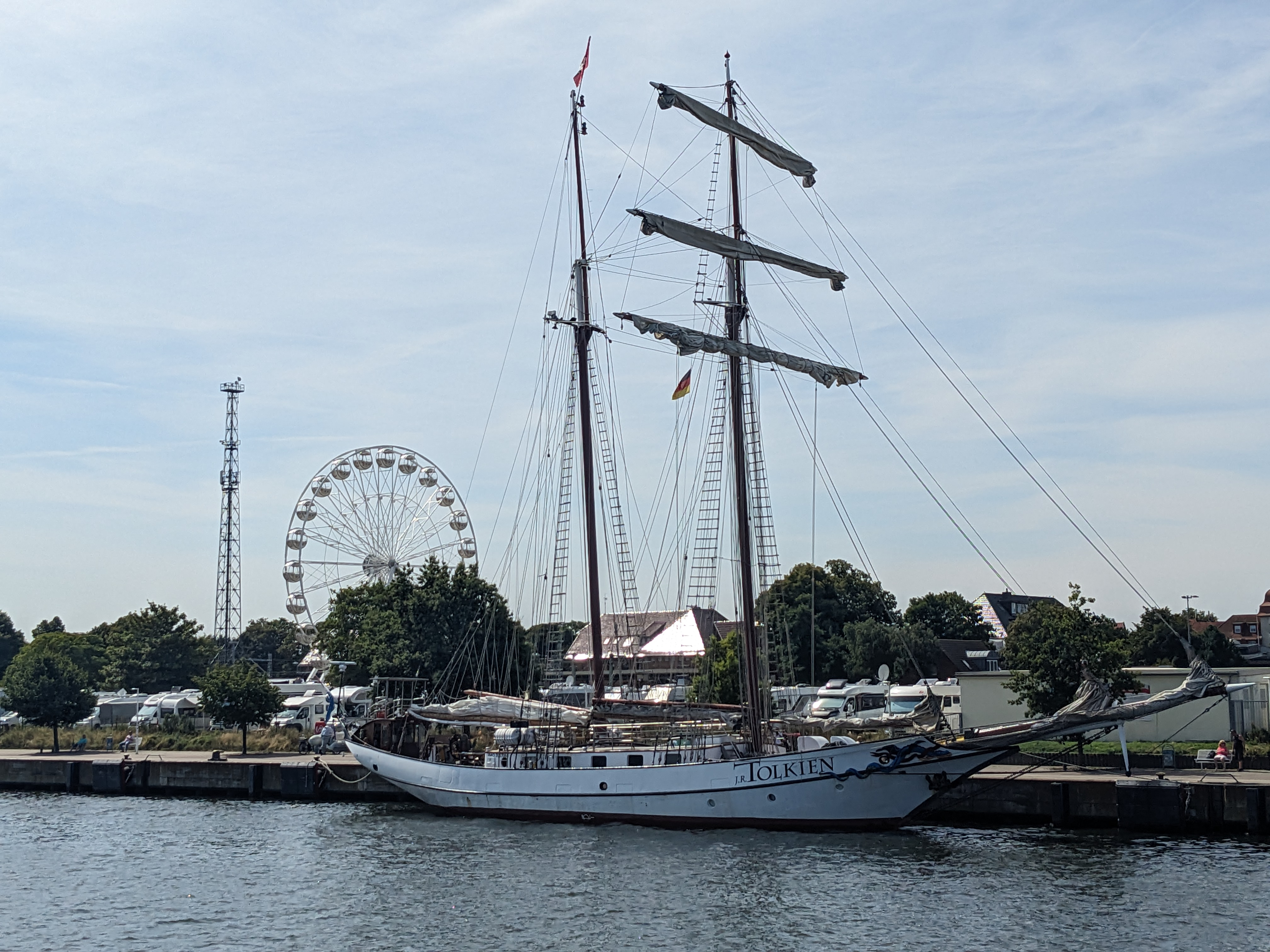
Warnemünde 2024

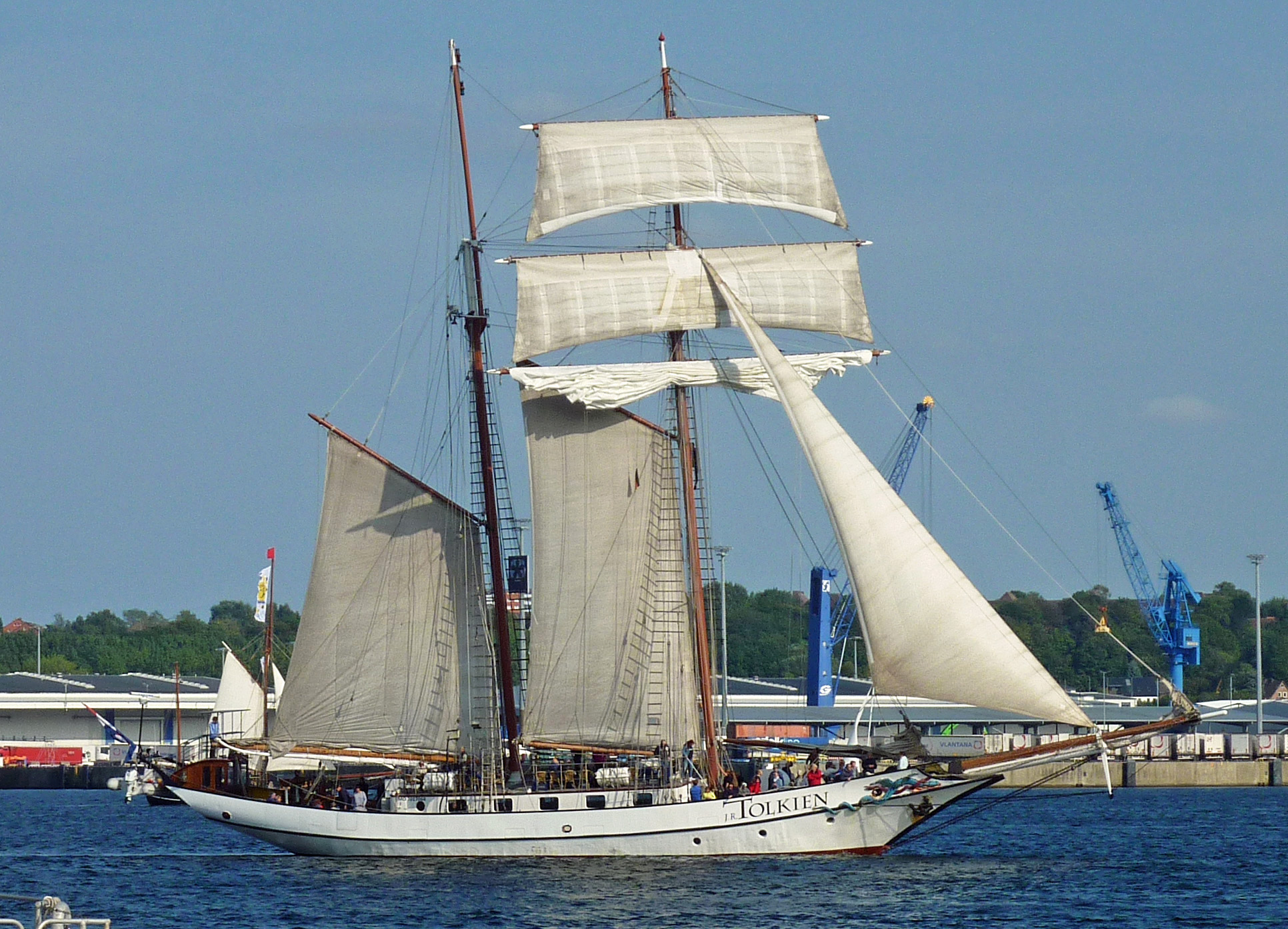
Kiel 2021

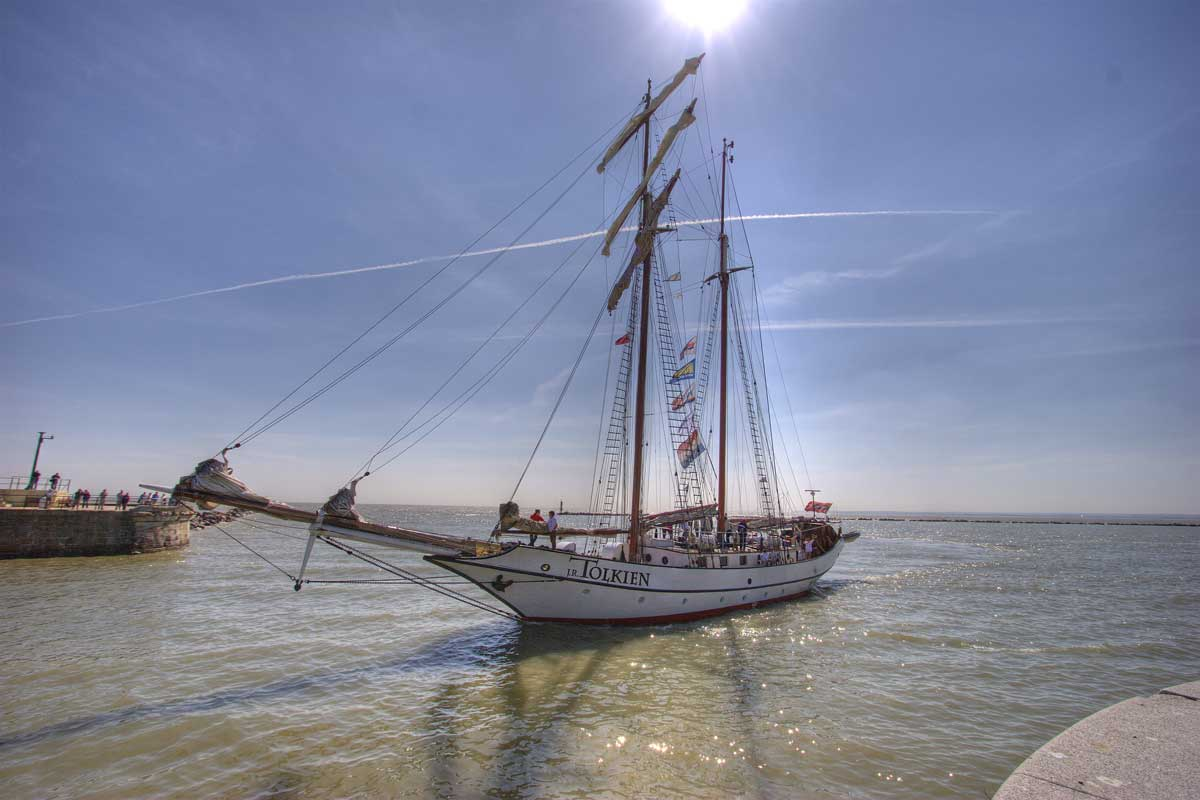
Ramsgate 2007

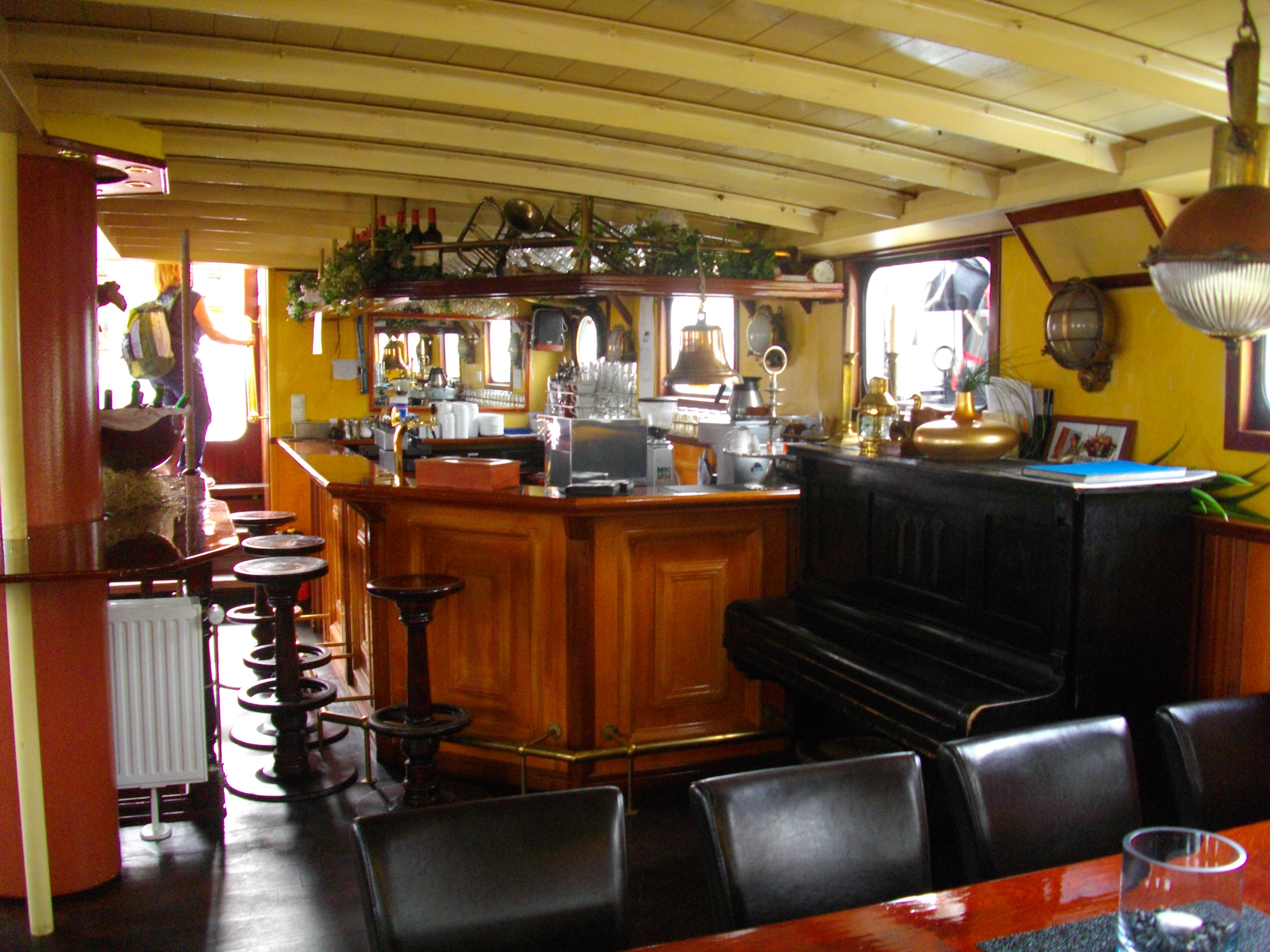
Saloon interior 2013

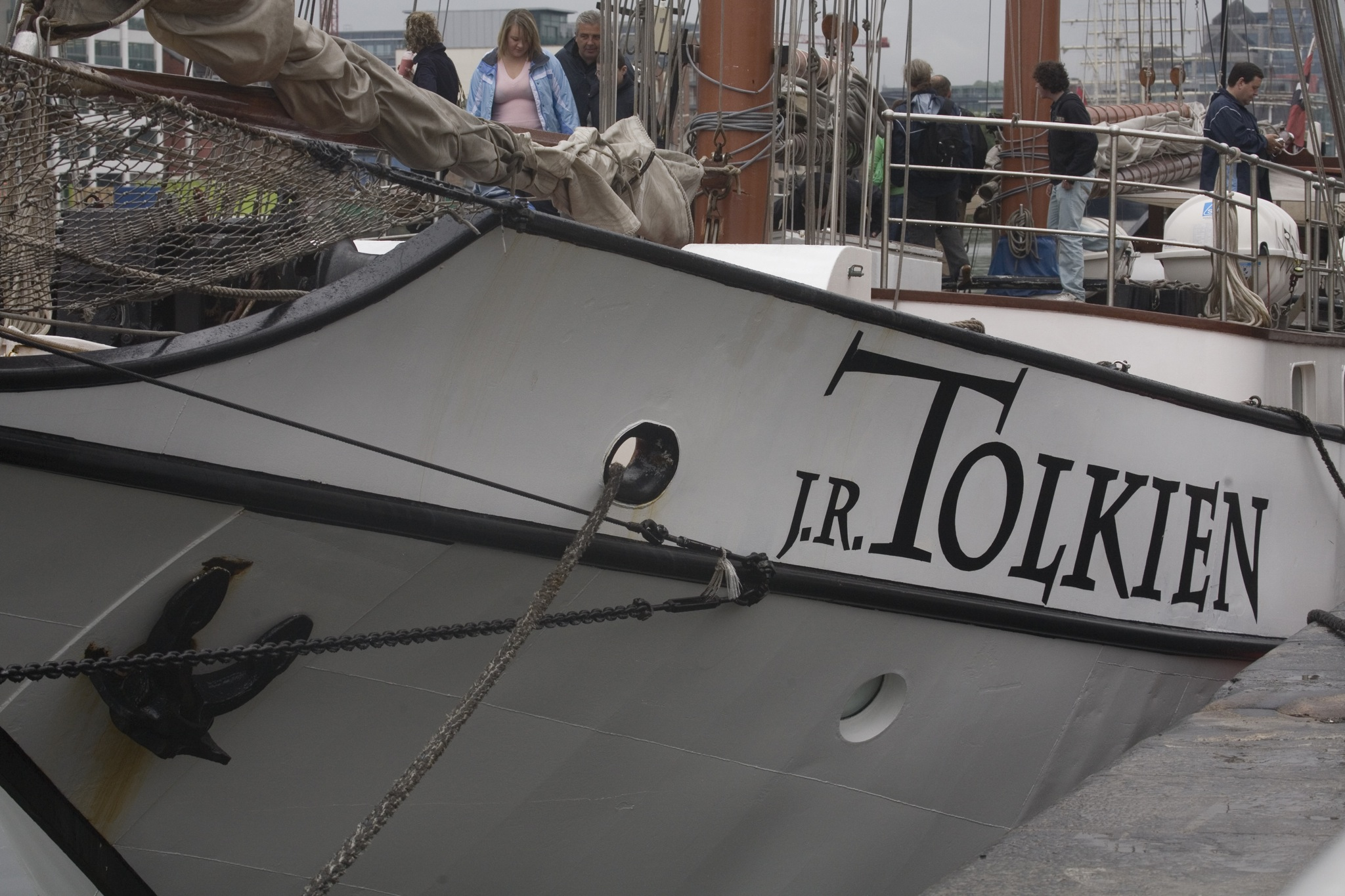
Dublin 2007

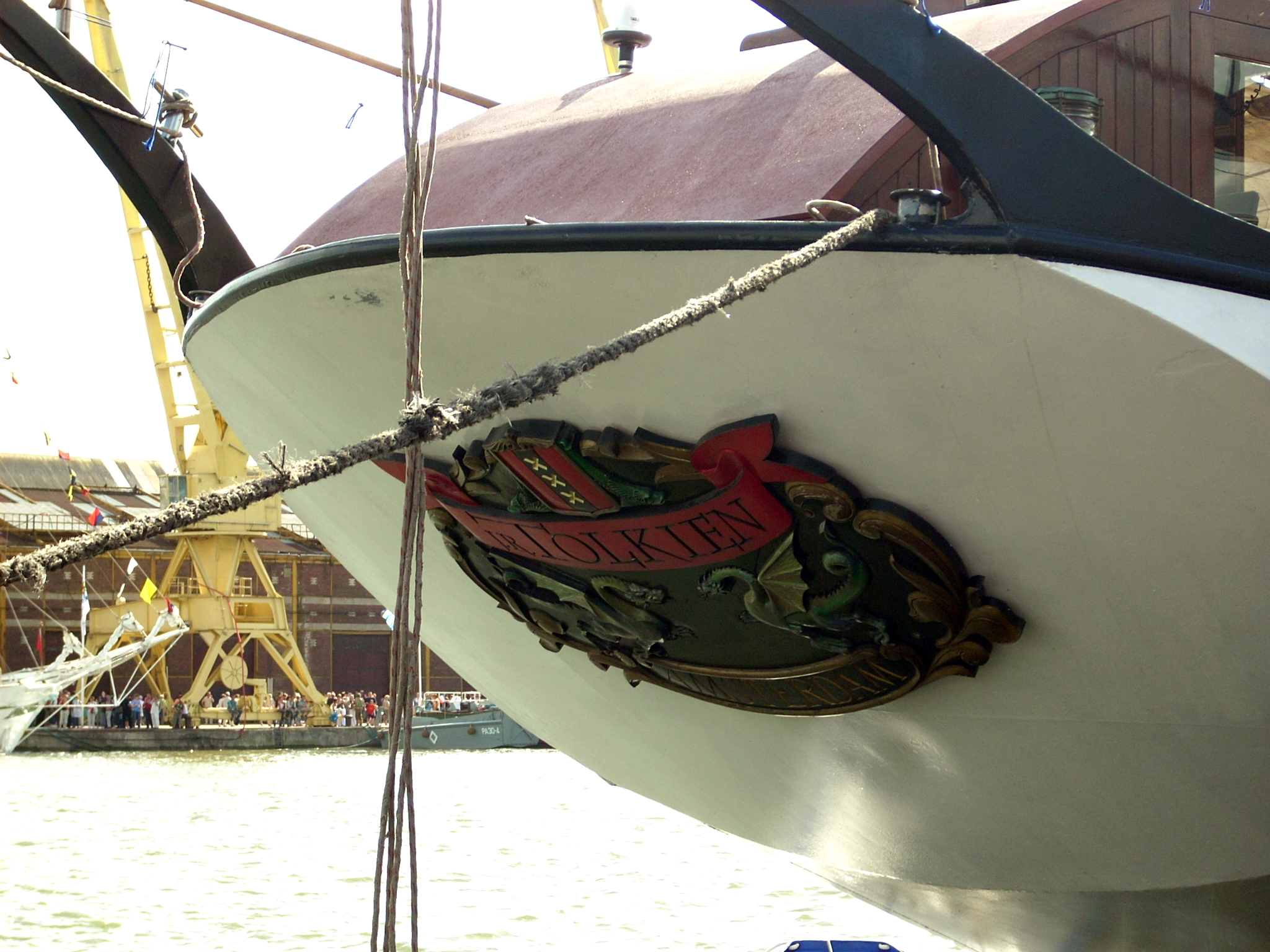
Rear taffrail 2008

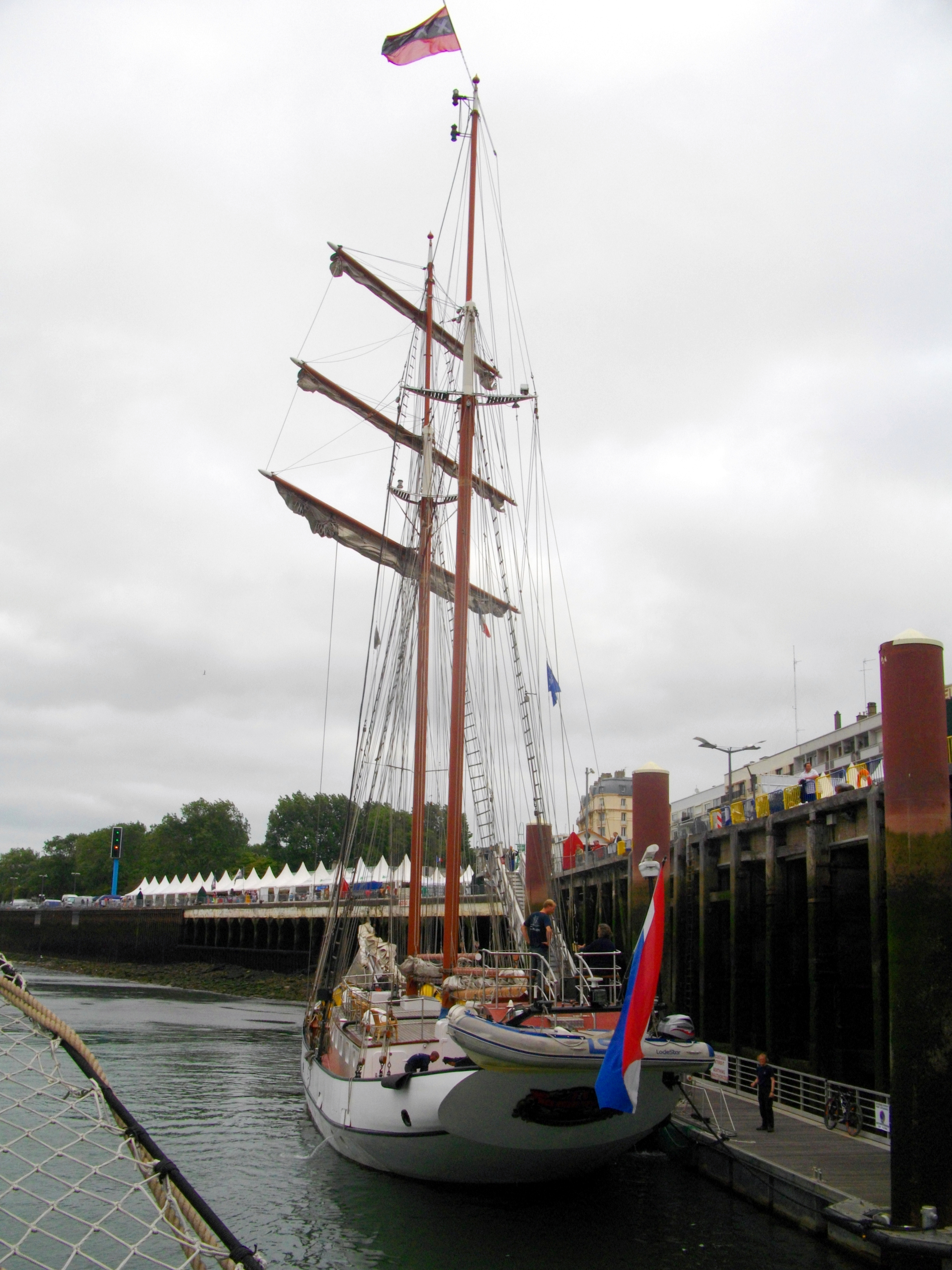
Boulogne 2013

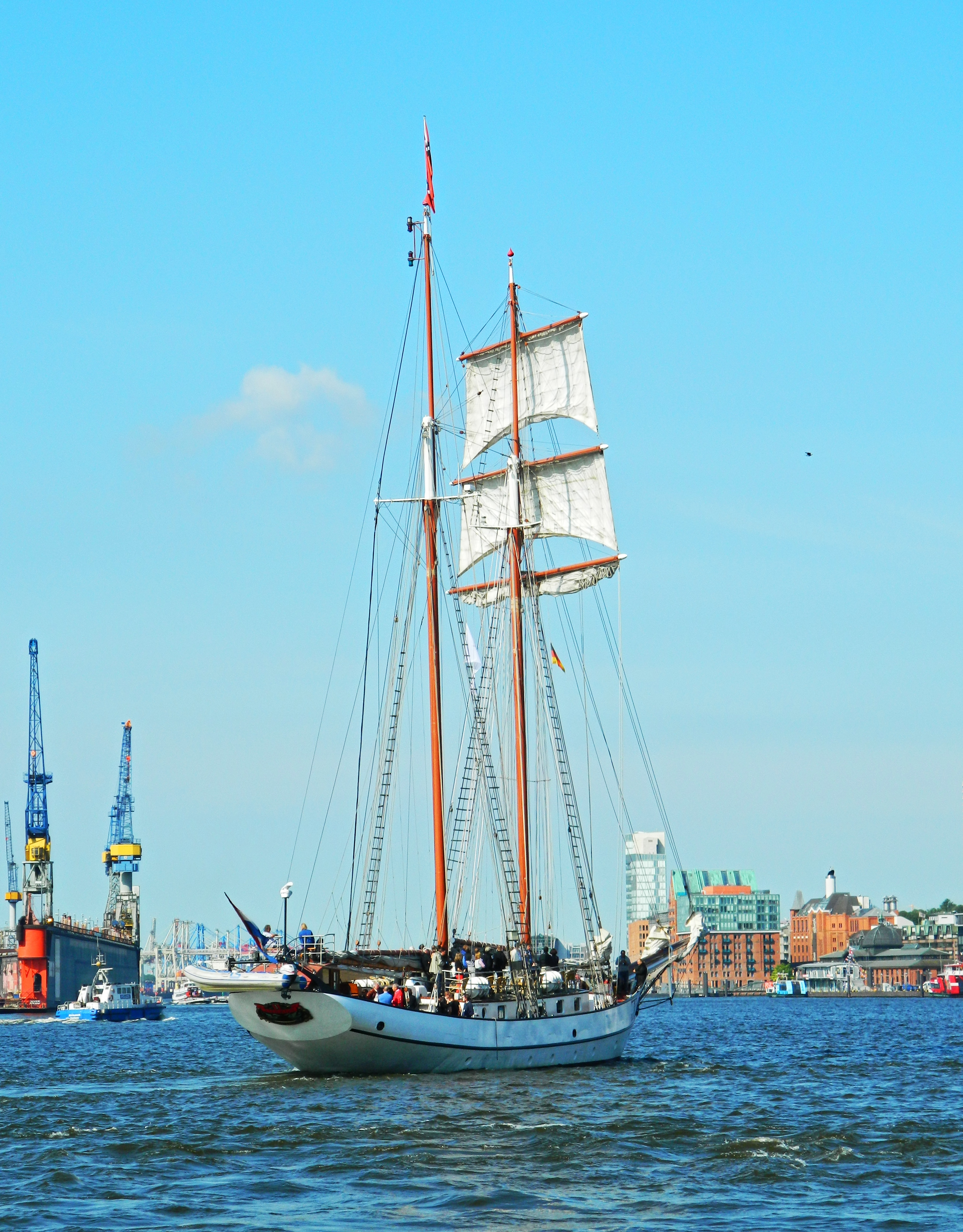
Hamburg 2013

Seebrücke Binz 2023
