= Deirdre Heenan =

Irish professor and political commentator

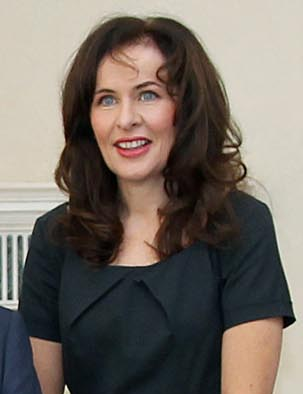
- Heenan in 2012
- Born: February 1968 (age 58); Annaclone, Northern Ireland
- Spouse: Rory Heenan
- Children: 3

Academic background
- Education: Ulster University

Deirdre Heenan is an Irish professor of social policy who was a former Pro-Vice-Chancellor of Ulster University and a former Provost of the University's Coleraine and Magee campuses. Prof Heenan was also appointed to the Council of State by the President of Ireland, Michael D. Higgins in 2012. She was appointed Lecturer in Policy Studies at the University of Ulster in 1995, becoming a Professor in 2007. She is a prominent political commentator in Northern Ireland.

== Early life ==
Heenan is from Annaclone in County Down and was educated at Banbridge Academy and Ulster University. She started as an undergraduate student and then went on to be a part-time lecturer at the university.

She worked as a Saturday record girl at Woolworths in Banbridge for two years.

== Career ==
Heenan started her career at Ulster University as a lecturer in 1995, before becoming a professor by 2007. In 2001, she received a Distinguished Teaching Award, and by 2006, the Higher Education Academy awarded her with a National Teaching Fellowship. She co-founded the Northern Ireland Life and Times Survey in 1998.

She previously served as Provost and Dean of Academic Development at Ulster University’s Magee campus. Heenan was the first female provost of the Magee campus. In 2008, she served as a policy adviser in the Office of the First Minister and Deputy First Minister in Northern Ireland for a nine-month term. In 2011, Heenan was appointed to a five-member panel by the Northern Ireland health minister to lead a major review of health and social care services. The following year, she was named to the Irish President’s Council of State as one of seven personal nominees selected by President Michael D. Higgins.

In addition to her academic and advisory roles, Heenan was a director of ILEX, the Derry urban regeneration company, until its dissolution in 2016, and served as a school governor at two Derry schools, Foyle College and St. Patrick’s Pennyburn.

She is the Northern Ireland Honorary Consul to Austria.

=== 2025 Irish presidential election speculation ===
In July 2025, Heenan said she could “neither confirm nor deny” that she had been approached by Fianna Fáil to be the party's candidate for the 2025 Irish presidential election. The party's backbenchers reportedly believed that she "ticks a lot of Mary McAleese boxes." McAleese is a Belfast lawyer and academic who won the 1997 presidential election with the backing of Fianna Fáil. Heenan was considered the preferred choice of Taoiseach and Fianna Fáil leader Micheál Martin. In a social media post on 30 August 2025, Heenan announced she had decided not to seek the presidency.

== Personal life ==
Heenan is married with three sons and used to live in Derry.
