= Gerald Dawe =

Irish poet and academic (1952–2024)

- Born: 22 April 1952; Belfast, Northern Ireland
- Died: 29 May 2024 (aged 72); Dún Laoghaire, County Dublin, Ireland
- Occupations: Professor; poet

Academic background
- Education: Orangefield High School
- Alma mater: Ulster University; University of Galway
- Thesis: A critical study of the major works of William Carleton (1794-1869) (1977)

Academic work
- Discipline: Literature
- Sub-discipline: Poetry
- Institutions: Trinity College Dublin

Gerald Dawe (22 April 1952 – 29 May 2024) was an Irish poet, academic and literary critic.

== Life and career ==
Gerald Dawe was born in 1952 in north Belfast, Northern Ireland to a Protestant family. He was the son of Gordon Dawe and Norma Fitzgerald Bradshaw and grew up with his mother, sister, grandmother, and great-grandmother. He lived mostly in the Skegoniell area and attended Seaview Primary School and then Orangefield Boys Secondary School across the city in East Belfast. While at school, he participated in the Lyric Youth Theatre under the teacher and theatre director, Sam McCready. He also started to write poems and after a brief period living in London, he returned to the North and attended the College of Business Studies before proceeding to the fledgling New University of Ulster (1971-1974) where his professor was the literary critic and novelist, Walter Allen. At the university he was associated with the so-called Coleraine Cluster of poets and writers. In 1974, he graduated receiving a B.A.(Hons) in English.

After graduation, Dawe worked briefly as an assistant librarian at the Fine Arts department, in the Central Library in Belfast before being awarded a Major State Award for Postgraduate Research from the Department of Education, Northern Ireland. He then proceeded to the University of Galway where he undertook graduate research on the 19th-century Tyrone novelist and short story writer, William Carleton. He also started to lecture in the Department of English at the university.

In Galway, he met Dorothea Melvin, his future wife, and settled in east Galway with his family – Iarla and Olwen.

In 1988 he was appointed Lecturer in English at Trinity College Dublin and for the next five years commuted between his home in Galway and work in Dublin before the family moved to Dublin in 1992. He was appointed a Fellow of Trinity College Dublin in 2004, a Professor in English and the inaugural director of the Oscar Wilde Centre for Irish Writing (1997-2015). He retired from Trinity College Dublin in 2017. He also held visiting professorships at Boston College and Villanova University in the United States as well as receiving International Writers' Fellowships from the Hawthorden Foundation (UK) and the Ledig Roholt Foundation Switzerland.

Dawe lived in Dun Laoghaire with his wife, Dorothea, who was chairperson of the 'think-tank', Encounter, director of the cultural resource body, Cultures of Ireland and head of public affairs at Ireland's national theatre, The Abbey, during the late 1990s and a board member of the Irish Association.

Dawe died at his home in Dun Laoghaire, on 29 May 2024, at the age of 72.

== Work ==
His first full collection, Sheltering Places, was published in 1978, receiving two years later, a Bursary for Poetry from the Arts Council of Ireland. His second collection, The Lundys Letter, was published in 1985 and was awarded the Macaulay Fellowship in Literature. The collection was concerned with the cultural and social roots of his background in Belfast and of the different Irish and emigre histories of his own family, highlighted by his new life in the west of Ireland.

Around 1990, he co-founded Lagan Press with Fortnight magazine manager Patrick Ramsey (absorbed by the Verbal Arts Centre in 2013). Dawe's How's the Poetry Going?: Literary Politics & Ireland Today (1991) was the new publisher's first book.

Over the next thirty years he published several books of poetry with Gallery Press. These included Sunday School (1991), Heart of Hearts (1995), The Morning Train (1999), Lake Geneva (2003), Points West (2008) and 'Mickey Finn's Air' (2014). In addition, several selections of his poetry were published. He also edited several collections of contemporary Irish poets and co-translated (with Marco Sonzogni) into English the early poems of the Sicilian poet and Nobel laureate, Salvatore Quasimodo. In 2024 a selection of his poems in translation entitled Versions, Selected Poems by Gerald Dawe in translation, edited by Florence Impens was published.

He also published works on Irish poetry and cultural issues, much of which is collected in his prose works: The Proper Word: Collected Criticism (2007), Of War and War's Alarms: Reflections on Modern Irish Writing (2015), In Another World: Van Morrison & Belfast (2017) and The Wrong Country: Essays on Modern Irish Writing (2018).

== Critical perspective ==
- John Brown. "In the Chair" Salmon Publishing 2000
- An Sionnach: A Journal of Literature, and the Arts, "A Special Issue dedicated to the work of Gerald Dawe", 3:1 (Spring 2007)
- Nicholas Allen. "Introduction", Gerald Dawe, The Proper Word: Ireland, Poetry, Politics (2007)
- Stan Smith. Something Misplaced: Gerald Dawe, Irish Poetry and the Construction of Modern Identity (2005)
- Cathal Dallat. "Mapping the Territory", The Guardian (UK) 18 October 2003
- Katrina Goldstone. "Twilight Zones", Irish Studies Review (May 2005)
- Jonathan Ellis. "Out of Time", Metre (Winter 2001/02)

== Publications ==
=== Poetry ===
- 2024: Versions, Selected Poems by Gerald Dawe in translation, edited by Florence Impens
- 2023: Another Time: Poems 1978-2023, Gallery Books ISBN 978-1-911338-56-7)
- 2019: The Last Peacock, Gallery Press (ISBN 978-1-911337-68-3)
- 2015: Early Poems, Gallery Press
- 2014: Mickey Finn's Air, Gallery Press (ISBN 978-1-85235-607-1)
- 2018: Selected Poems, Gallery Press (ISBN 978-1-85235-530-2)
- 2008: Points West, Gallery Press (ISBN 978-1-85235-447-3)
- 2003: Lake Geneva, Gallery Press (ISBN 978-1-85235-342-1)
- 1999: The Morning Train, Gallery Press (ISBN 978-1-85235-260-8)
- 1995: Heart of Hearts, Gallery Press (ISBN 978-1-85235-154-0)
- 1991: Sunday School, Gallery Press (ISBN 978-1-85235-063-5)
- 1990: The Water Table, Honest Ulsterman
- 1985: The Lundys Letter, Gallery Press (ISBN 978-0-904011-84-5)
- 1978: Sheltering Places, Rudyard Press
- 1976: Heritages, Aquila Press (ISBN 978-0-7275-0117-2)

=== Essays ===
- 2023: Balancing Acts: Conversations with Gerald Dawe on a Life in Poetry, edited by Frank Ferguson
- 2023: Politic Words: Writing Women| Writing History
- 2022: Northern Windows/Southern Stars: Selected Early Essays 1983-1994, Peter Lang
- 2021: A City Imagined: Belfast Soulscapes, Merrion Press
- 2020: Looking Through You: Northern Chronicles, Merrion Press
- 2020: Dreaming of Home: Seven Irish Writers, Peter Lang
- 2020: The Sound of the Shuttle: Essays on Cultural Belonging & Protestantism in Northern Ireland, Irish Academic Press
- 2018: The Wrong Country: Essays on Modern Irish Writing, Irish Academic Press
- 2017: In Another World: Van Morrison & Belfast, Merrion Press
- 2015: Of War and War's Alarms: Reflections on Modern Irish Writing
- 2007: My Mother-City, Lagan Press
- 1998: The Rest is History, Abbey Press
- 1991: How's the Poetry Going, Lagan Press

=== As editor ===
- 2018: The Cambridge Companion to Irish Poets, Cambridge University Press
- 2009: Earth Voices Whispering: An Anthology of Irish War Poetry 1914-45, Blackstaff Press
- 2008: Earth Voices Whispering: Irish poetry of war, 1914–1945 (2008)
- 1991: The New Younger Irish Poets, Blackstaff Press
- 1991: Yeats: The Poems, a new selection
- 1982: The Younger Irish Poets, Blackstaff Press

=== As Co-editor ===
- 2019: Ethna McCarthy Poems with Eoin O'Brien
- 2012: Beautiful Strangers: Ireland & the world of the Fifties with Darryl Jones and Nora Pelizarria, Peter Lang (ISBN 978-3-0343-0801-4}
- 2012: Ruined Pages: New Selected Poems of Padraic Fiacc with Aodan Mac Poilin, Blackstaff (ISBN 978-0-85640-529-7)
- 2008: Heroic Heart: A Charles Donnelly Reader with Kay Donnelly, Lagan Press (ISBN 978-1-908188-07-6)
- 2008: The Night Fountain: Selected early poems of Salvatore Quasimodo with Marco Sonzogni, Arc Publications (ISBN 978-1-904614-87-6)
- 2008: Dramatis Personae and other writings by Stewart Parker with Maria Johnston and Clare Wallace, Czech Institute of Egyptology (ISBN 978-80-7308-241-3)
- 2008: High Pop: the Irish Times column of Stewart Parker with Maria Johnston, Lagan Press (ISBN 978-1-904652-57-1)
- 2004: The Writer Fellow with Terence Brown
- 2001: The Ogham Stone: an anthology of modern Ireland with Michael Mulreany
- 1996: Krino: the Review, 1986–1996, an anthology of modern Irish writing with Jonathan Williams
- 1994: Ruined Pages: Selected Poems of Padraic Fiacc with Aodan Mac Poilin
- 1991: The Poet's Place: Essays on Ulster Literature & Society with John Wilson Foster
- 1985: Across a Roaring Hill: the Protestant Imagination in Modern Ireland with Edna Longley

=== Film ===
- 2023: Gerald Dawe – Out Of The Ordinary, BBC

== Prizes and awards ==
- 2024: Lawrence O’Shaughnessy Poetry Award
- 2000: Arts Council of Ireland Bursary for Poetry
- 1999: Ledig-Rowholt International Writers Fellowship (Switzerland)
- 1987: Hawthorden International Writers Fellowship (UK)
- 1984: Macaulay Fellowship in Literature for The Lundys Letter
- 1980: Arts Council of Ireland Bursary for Poetry
- 1974-77: Major State Award (Northern Ireland Department of Education)

=== Distinctions ===
- 2016-17: Visiting Scholar, Pembroke College, Cambridge (UK)
- 2013: The Moore Institute Fellowship, NUI, Galway
- 2009: Heimbold Chair, Irish Studies, Villanova University, Philadelphia
- 2005: J.J. Burns Visiting Professor, Boston College
- 2004: Fellow, Trinity College Dublin

== Interviews ==
- 2016: Eleanor Doorley http://thelonelycrowd.org/2016/09/26/balancing-acts-gerald-dawe-in-conversation-with-eleanor-doorley/
- 2016: https://www.tcd.ie/trinitywriters/writers/gerald-dawe/
- 2015: Dave Lourdan http://humag.co/features/gerald-dawe
- 2015: Philip Coleman http://www.icarusmagazine.com/may-2015/2015/9/19/featured-a-conversation-between-gerald-dawe-and-philip-coleman
- 2014: Andrea Rea http://www.drb.ie/essays/good-remembering
