= Fortnight (magazine) =

Northern Irish political magazine

- Cover of the March 1972 issue
- Categories: Politics and culture
- Frequency: monthly
- Founded: 1970
- Final issue: 2012
- Country: United Kingdom
- Based in: Belfast, Northern Ireland
- Language: English
- ISSN: 0141-7762

Fortnight was a monthly political and cultural magazine published in Belfast, Northern Ireland. The magazine was founded in 1970 with the aim of providing analysis and criticism of politics, culture, and the arts from those from both inside and outside the local mainstream. Fortnight was read by and contributed to by people from all over the spectrum. Gerry Adams is credited as saying "A month without Fortnight would be twice as long."

Previous contributors include politicians and journalists. Most notably, David Trimble - ex-leader of the Ulster Unionists and Mary Robinson, later President of Ireland - contributed material to Fortnight. Other politicians who wrote for the magazine included Peter Robinson.

Other notable contributors include: Newton Emerson (who spawned the popular satirical website Portadown News), Ed Moloney, Eamonn McCann, Fionnula O'Connor, Brian Trench, Gene Kerrigan, Mary Holland, Douglas Gageby (the former editor of The Irish Times), Barry White of The Belfast Telegraph, Conor O'Clery, John Cooney, Dick Walsh and Nell McCafferty.

Editors have included Tom Hadden, Andy Pollak (1981-1985), Leslie Van Slyke, Robin Wilson (later to found the Democratic Dialogue thinktank), John O'Farrell and Malachi O'Doherty. Literary editors have included the poets James Simmons and Medbh McGuckian. Cartoonist Martyn Turner has been a regular contributor since the magazine was founded, and also edited the magazine for a number of years.

Fortnight was supported by grants from the Arts Council of Northern Ireland. It won the Christopher Ewart-Biggs Memorial Prize for 1982.

In late 2011, it was announced Fortnight would cease publication. The final issue was published in 2012.

In September 2020 a 50th Anniversary edition of the magazine entitled Fortnight at 50' was published. The fortnight website was also reinstated and several new editions have been published throughout 2021.
