= Windeyer =

Windeyer may refer to:

== People ==
- Brian Windeyer Vice-Chancellor of London University (1969–72)
- Charles Windeyer (1780–1855), Australian magistrate
- Gordon Windeyer (born 1954), Australian high jumper
- Margaret Windeyer (1866–1939), Australian librarian and women's rights campaigner
- Mary Elizabeth Windeyer (1837–1912), Australian women's rights campaigner
- Richard Windeyer (1806–1847), barrister and Australian politician
- Richard Windeyer (barrister) (1868–1959), Australian barrister
- William Charles Windeyer (1834–1897), Australian politician and judge
- William John Victor Windeyer (1900–1987), Australian judge, soldier and educator

== Places ==
- Windeyer County, New South Wales, named after "the Windeyer brothers"
- Windeyer Institute of Medical Science at University College London
- Windeyer Public School (List of Government schools in New South Wales: Q-Z#W)
