= Windeyer family (Australia) =

The Windeyer family is a prominent family in the Australian legal profession. Members of the family include:

- Charles Windeyer (1780–1855), father of Richard (1806-1847), first Mayor of Sydney and magistrate.
- Margaret Windeyer (1866–1939) daughter of William Charles and Mary, librarian and women's rights campaigner
- Mary Windeyer (1836–1912) wife of William Charles, mother of Margaret, Richard (1868–1959) and William Archibald, women's rights campaigner
- Richard Windeyer (1806–1847), son of Charles, barrister
- Richard Windeyer (barrister) (1868–1959) son of William Charles and Mary, barrister
- Victor Windeyer (1900–1987), son of Richard (1868–1959), Justice of the High Court of Australia and Judicial Committee of the Privy Council.
- William Archibald Windeyer (1871–1943) son of William Charles and Mary, solicitor
- William Charles Windeyer (1834–1897) son of Richard (1806-1847), Attorney-General of New South Wales and Judge of the Supreme Court of New South Wales
- William Victor Windeyer, President of Law Society of New South Wales and Judge of the Supreme Court of New South Wales.
