= Edward Meyerstein =

Edward Meyerstein may refer to:

- E. H. W. Meyerstein (1889–1952), English writer and scholar
- Edward William Meyerstein (1863–1942), British merchant, stockbroker and philanthropist
