= Hamilton Town Hall =

Hamilton Town Hall may refer to:

- Hamilton Townhouse, a building in Hamilton, South Lanarkshire, Scotland, U.K.
- Hamilton Town Hall (Hamilton, Montana), listed on the NRHP in Ravalli County, Montana, USA
- Hamilton Town Hall, Brisbane, former town hall in the Brisbane suburb of Hamilton, Queensland, Australia
