= Ascot State School =

School in Brisbane, Australia

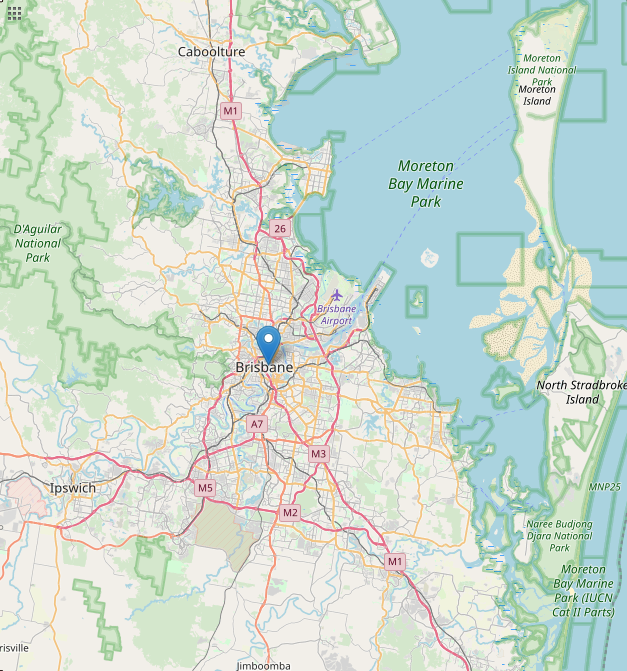
- Location within Australia Location within Queensland Location within Brisbane
- 27.4331°S 153.0565°E
- Location: Pringle Street, Ascot, City of Brisbane, Queensland, Australia

History
- Design period: 1919–1930s (Interwar period)
- Built: 1919–1939, 1920–1963, 1956–1963

Site notes
- Architect: Department of Public Works (Queensland)

Queensland Heritage Register
- Official name: Ascot State School
- Type: state heritage
- Designated: 7 April 2017
- Reference no.: 650044
- Type: Education, Research, Scientific Facility: School – state (primary)
- Theme: Educating Queenslanders: Providing primary schooling

Ascot State School is a heritage-listed independent public, co-educational, primary school, located on Pringle Street, in the City of Brisbane suburb of Ascot, in Queensland, Australia. Designed by the Department of Public Works (Queensland) and built from 1919 to 1939, the school was added to the Queensland Heritage Register on 7 April 2017. It is administered by the Department of Education, with an enrolment of 646 students and a teaching staff of 43, as of 2023. The school serves students from Prep to Year 6.

== History ==
Ascot State School was established on 20 May 1920, and opened on 24 May 1920. It is important in demonstrating the evolution of state education and its associated architecture. It retains three urban brick school buildings (Block A: 1920, Block B: 1928–34, Block C: 1923–39), which incorporate rare educational murals in Block B. It is set in landscaped grounds with a playing field, sporting facilities and mature trees. The school has a strong and ongoing association with the Ascot community.

Traditionally the land of the Turrbal and Jagera people, land at Ascot was sold as country lots in the late 1850s and early 1860s, and underwent subdivision from the 1880s after the Doomben railway line to the Eagle Farm Racecourse opened in 1882. However, most housing development occurred after the turn of the century, stimulated by the opening of the electrified tram to the racecourse, along the current Kingsford Smith Drive and Racecourse Road, in 1899.

Dramatic reform of the Queensland Education system began around 1909 and continued until the beginning of World War I. During this period a high school system was introduced, technical education was expanded, the University of Queensland was inaugurated, a teachers' training college was established, the requirement for a local contribution of construction costs for new schools was abolished, and the leaving age was increased from 12 to 14 years. Although technically compulsory since 1875, school attendance was not enforced until 1900. Subsequently, student numbers rose across Queensland during the first 15 years of the 20th century.

Actions to establish a state school in Ascot commenced in 1914. The current site, bounded by Pringle, Anthony and Mayfield (now Massey) Streets, was purchased for a future school in May 1914 at a cost of £1400. In December 1915 a public meeting, held to organise a state school at Ascot, established the prerequisite school building committee for that purpose. However, due to World War I, there were insufficient funds to institute the school.

Approval for the school, comprising an urban brick school building, was given on 13 June 1919. Brick school buildings were far less frequently built than timber ones, only being provided in prosperous urban or suburban areas with stable or rapidly-increasing populations. All brick school buildings were individually designed with variations in style, size, and form, but generally retained similar classroom sizes, layouts and window arrangements to timber schools to facilitate natural light and ventilation. However, compared to contemporary standard education buildings, these buildings had a grander character and greater landmark attributes.

Ascot State School opened on 24 May 1920 with 124 pupils enrolled. Its urban brick school building (now called Block A) was an "attractive building of brick, rough-casted externally, plastered internally, ceiled with fibro-cement and roofed with tiles". Highset, it comprised three classrooms, verandah and attached teachers room. Each classroom featured a bank of windows, which allowed natural light to enter from the left side of the students, and had battened ceilings with a central ceiling vent. A photograph from 1920 shows casement windows, with fanlights, sheltered below window hoods and a tiled, gable roof with a central ventilation roof fleche. Verandah corners were enclosed with dark-coloured weatherboards, centred four-pane windows, and light-coloured, vertically battened timber balustrades and trim. Costing £3,556, the school building was designed to accommodate 120 pupils.

An important component of Queensland state schools was their grounds. The early and continuing commitment to play-based education, particularly in primary school, resulted in the provision of outdoor play space and sporting facilities, such as ovals and tennis courts. Aesthetically designed gardens were encouraged by regional inspectors, and educators believed gardening and Arbor Days instilled in young minds the value of hard work and activity, improved classroom discipline, developed aesthetic tastes, and inspired people to stay on the land. From Ascot State School's inception, there was an emphasis on creating a beautiful environment for the pupils, with the result that the school's gardens were admired by locals and visitors. However, Arbor Day was not observed during the first head teacher's administration (Thomas Henderson, 1920–39) because "every Thursday the children [were]...given a practical lesson on the planting and culture of various plants and shrubs".

During Ascot State School's first year, its school committee made enormous improvements to the school grounds. They established gardens, spray lines to water them, an impressive array of playground equipment on a terraced playground, a tennis court (located northeast of the school building on the Pringle Street side) and a swimming pool 60 by 20 feet (18.3 m × 6.1 m) located to the southeast of the school building and fronting Massey Street. The school's tree-planting programme "strictly followed [a] plan, which allowed for only colourful flowering trees to be planted around the school ground's perimeter i.e poinciana, jacaranda, silky oak and...South African red tulip tree[s]". However, the school's small oval was a rough, at times boggy, site that took years to improve.

In the same year, enrolments at Ascot State School outstripped accommodation as subdivision and residential building in Ascot boosted its population. By April 1921, less than a year after opening, the school population was 310.

Money was allocated by the government for an additional wing in October 1922. This northern wing (now called Block C) was completed in the following year and officially opened on 20 October 1923. It ran perpendicular to the school's first building, faced Pringle Street and was connected to the original building by a verandah. Similar in design and materials to the first building, it was brick with rough-cast external render. It provided three new classrooms and a teachers room, while the undercroft was divided into play space and a gymnasium.

Enrolments continued to grow as Ascot's population increased. In 1927 there were 568 pupils at the school and four classes were taught permanently in the undercroft. In response, the Department of Public Works (DPW) drew plans in 1927 for a new, southern block (Block B), which would form a U-shaped complex plan.

On 25 August 1928, Block B was opened by the Minister for Public Instruction, Thomas Wilson. Built of rough-cast render and brick, it provided four extra classrooms on the upper floor level of the existing school and one underneath, each of which was 20 by 20 feet (6.1 m × 6.1 m). The whole provided extra seating accommodation for 200 pupils. Folding partitions on the upper floor converted the classrooms into one assembly room. The undercroft was concreted. A photograph from 1928 shows the building had tiled window hoods, and banks of casement windows and centre-pivoting sashes with awning fanlights.

Commencement of the Great Depression in 1929 halted fulfilment of further accommodation requests for the next three years at Ascot State School. The Great Depression caused a dramatic reduction in public building work in Queensland and brought private building work to a standstill. The Forgan Smith Labor Government came to power in June 1932 after a campaign that advocated increased government spending to counter the effects of the Depression. It embarked on a large public building programme designed to promote the employment of local skilled workers, the purchase of local building materials and the production of commodious, low maintenance buildings which would be a long-term asset to the state. This building programme included: government offices, schools and colleges; university buildings; hospitals and asylums; courthouses, police stations and gaols.

Extension of Block C was approved and commenced in September 1932. Comprising two classrooms of 22 by 18 feet (6.7 m × 5.5 m) with 10-foot (3.0 m) wide verandahs and a hat room on two levels, plus lavatory facilities underneath, it accommodated a further 80 pupils and cost £1033. The design and materials matched existing work. In the same year, lavatories were also constructed under Block B, and a dressing shed added to the swimming pool.

Immediately after the completion of the addition to Block C, more classrooms were required for the 707 pupils enrolled at June 1933, as the school's 13 classrooms accommodated only 520 pupils. Plans for a major extension to Block B, which would complete that building for approximately £3,388, were approved in December 1933 and construction began early in 1934. The DPW's Annual Report described it as a three-storied addition with separate entrances to each floor. The middle floor contained a single classroom 40 by 22 feet (12.2 m × 6.7 m) designed as a one-teacher school with a gallery for 36 trainees and a 10-foot (3.0 m) wide verandah. The top floor contained two classrooms, stairs, verandah, hat room and cloakroom. Folding partitions separated these and the existing classrooms. The floor of one of the new classrooms was raised 2 feet 6 inches (0.76 m) above the level of the floor of the existing classroom, which enabled it to be used as a stage. The new classroom, together with the four existing rooms, formed a large assembly hall when the folding partitions were opened. The cloakroom served as a dressing room behind the stage.

In 1935, less than a year after the completion of the Block B addition, the head teacher requested more accommodation. The disparity between the number of pupils and classrooms worsened, as work on addition did not commence until after May 1939, by which time the school population had risen to 822. With an authorised cost of £4,387, these additions to Block C completed the symmetrical layout of the school buildings. Constructed of brick and concrete with a Marseilles tile roof, the design utilised the fall of the land on the site to provide sub-basement, basement and ground floors. Accommodation comprised four classrooms, teachers room, cloak rooms, seating area and store, together with a concrete staircase at the eastern end of the wing and verandahs to the north. Each classroom had folding partitions to create a single room of approximately 60 by 22 feet (18.3 m × 6.7 m). The extension accommodated 160 pupils.

Changes to the grounds took place in conjunction with this addition. Concrete pathways were laid to all sides of the addition and concrete steps, and park rail fences were set on the banks between the terraces of the upper level. A new tennis court replaced the old one, which was encroached upon by the new extension.

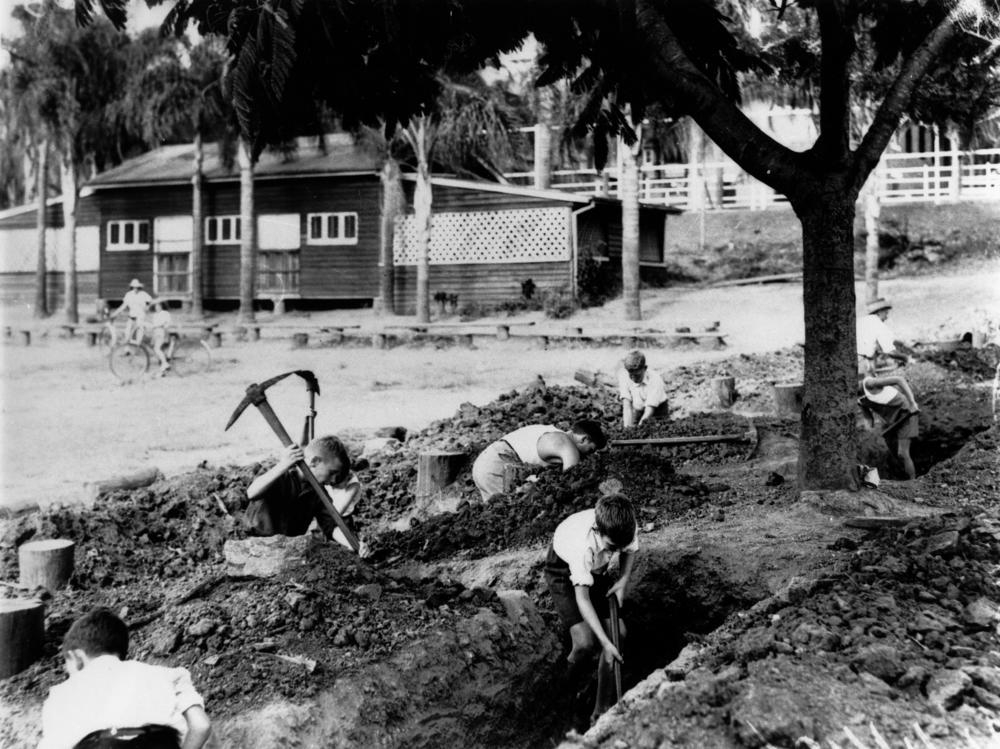
Children digging air raid trenches as protection against Japanese air raids, 1942

Commencement of the War in the Pacific during World War II impacted on schools. In January 1942 due to fears of a Japanese invasion, the Queensland Government closed all coastal state schools, and although most schools reopened on 2 March 1942, student attendance was optional until the war ended. Slit trenches, for protecting the students from Japanese air raids, were also dug at Queensland state schools. A photograph of Ascot State School in 1942 shows older male pupils digging slit trenches.

Typically, schools were a focus for civilian duty during wartime. At many, students and staff members grew produce and flowers for donation to local hospitals and organised fundraising and the donation of useful items to Australian soldiers on active service. At Ascot State School, vegetable gardens were a special feature of the garden work performed by pupils. The produce was distributed mainly to Red Cross hostels and canteens, although later in the war it was sold for the benefit of Patriotic Funds.

After World War II, Ascot's population continued to rise, as did that of the school, which peaked at 1433 in 1959. The Department of Public Instruction was largely unprepared for the enormous demand for state education that began in the late 1940s and continued well into the 1960s. This was a nationwide occurrence resulting from immigration and the unprecedented population growth now termed the "baby boom". Queensland schools were overcrowded and to cope many new buildings were constructed and existing buildings were extended. A number of new buildings were added at Ascot State School between 1950 and 1960. Most have been replaced.

Along with the expansion of the school's buildings came improvement and expansion of the school's grounds. In 1955, extensive drainage and earthworks and development of the oval were planned. The Minister for Public Instruction requested that the Brisbane City Council (BCC) transfer its park land to the east of the school to the Department of Public Instruction. The BCC agreed to vest the land in the Secretary of Public Instruction as trustee in perpetuity, provided an undertaking was given "to develop, maintain and use the area during normal school hours as playground for the school children, free of buildings and fencing and allow the use of the area by the general public during other than school hours". The transfer took place in June 1956 and on 10 August 1956 the completed, upgraded Meibush Oval, named after a former school principal, was opened by the Minister for Public Instruction, Jack Pizzey. The total cost of the project was £4087 including a government subsidy of £1577. Further renovations of the oval were required in 1963 when, amongst other improvements, concrete stairs were built on the Massey Street side.

With the transfer of Grade 8 education to secondary schools from January 1964, the pressure on classroom accommodation was largely resolved. However, further additions to the site and improvements to facilities and accommodation occurred in the ensuing decades. During the 1970s and 1980s a number of new buildings were constructed.

Early buildings were also altered over time. In 1970 extensions and alterations to the Block A teachers room took place. In 1977 the verandah of Block B was enclosed. In 1979 alterations to Blocks A, B and C were approved, as were plans for enclosure of Block C's verandah. In 1980, provision was made for the janitor and cleaners in Block B, and all toilet blocks were remodelled and upgraded. The roofs of Blocks A, B and C were re-tiled in mid-1982. At the turn of the 21st century, as part of the Building Better Schools Program, classrooms in Block C were upgraded.

The school's grounds also underwent significant improvements. In 1966 a larger pool replaced the earlier one. In the 1980s, landscaping of the areas between Blocks A, B and C, and the rejuvenation and extension of the adventure playground took place. In 2000, the tennis court between Blocks D and G was converted into a covered area and a new canteen added to the east of Block D.

Community involvement in the school has been significant since the school's opening. In the early years the parents established gardens, built playground equipment, and constructed a tennis court and swimming pool. Creating a usable oval occupied the school committee's attention for many years. For about 10 years from c. 1923, the Ascot Show Society held its annual show in the Ascot State School grounds. Fancy dress balls were also held at the school in the 1930s. From the 1960s, through until at least the late 1970s, fundraising through walkathons was popular.

Introduced by the first head teacher at the school, murals were painted on classroom walls for educational purposes. The earliest, painted by a commercial artist, were in place by November 1930. Others were painted by Arthur E Guymer, while working as a trainee and as a teacher at the school in the 1930s. Murals of sheep- and cattle-raising, exports, mining, sugar growing and other industries were painted on bulkheads and classroom walls throughout the school. In the infants' classroom, Brer Rabbit, Donald Duck and other characters were depicted. Murals relating to Queensland industries, transport and tourism, Australian states and New Zealand remain in some classrooms of Block B.

As at 2017, the school continues to operate from its original site. It retains its urban brick school buildings, set in landscaped grounds with sporting facilities, playing areas, and mature shade trees. Ascot State School is important to Ascot as a key social focus for the community, as generations of students have been taught there and many social events held in the school's grounds and buildings since its establishment.

== Description ==
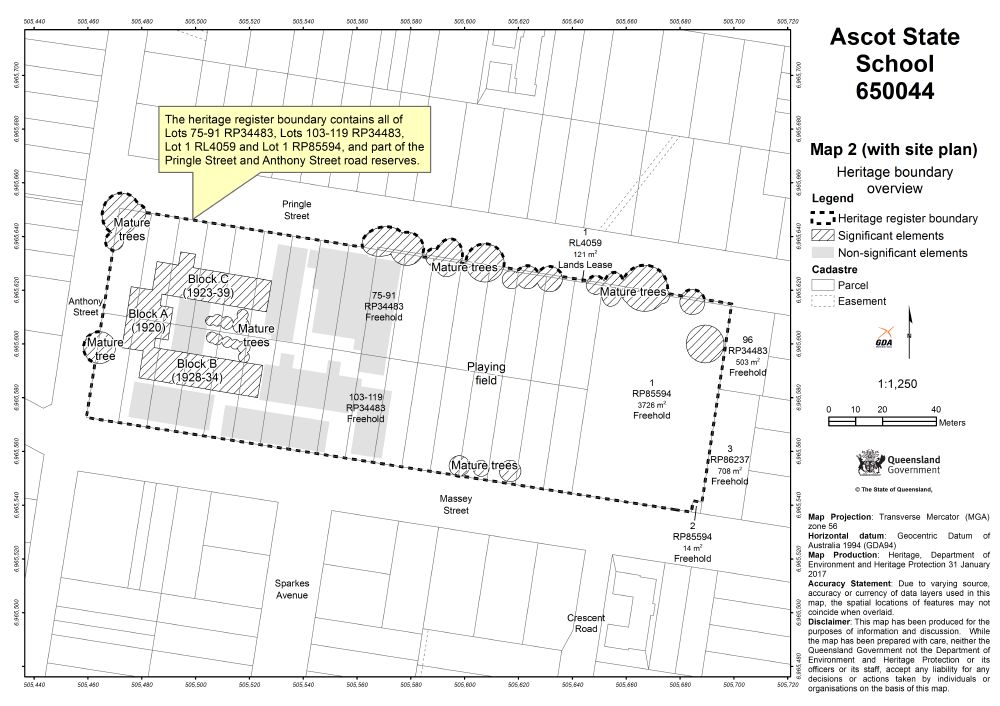
Site plan, 2017

Ascot State School occupies a 1.816 hectares (4.49 acres), sloping site within the residential suburb of Ascot, approximately 6 kilometres (3.7 mi) northeast of the Brisbane CBD. The rectangular site faces and is primarily accessed from Pringle Street to the north; and is bounded on other sides by Anthony Street to the west, Massey Street to the south and residential properties to the east. The school buildings are located on the elevated, western end of the school grounds, and a large playing field occupies the lower, eastern portion of the site. Fronting Pringle, Anthony and Massey streets, three connected urban brick school buildings (blocks A, B and C) are set in a U-shape configuration and are the earliest and westernmost of the school buildings. The school grounds contain a number of significant mature trees and landscaping features, including a courtyard (between blocks A, B and C), mature trees and a playing field. Block B contains rare educational murals on its classroom walls.

=== Urban brick school buildings (blocks A, B and C) ===
The three urban brick school buildings (blocks A, B and C) are individually designed, masonry and timber structures, which have terracotta-tiled gable and Dutch-gable roofs. The gable ends and gablets have decorative timbering set in front of circular roof vents; and prominent fleches protrude above the roofs. The three buildings are symmetrically arranged in a U-shaped plan, with Block A located centrally to the west (running north–south); Block B to the south (running east–west); and Block C to the north (running east–west).

The buildings range from a single storey with an undercroft (open space) at the west to two storeys at the east, reflecting the slope of the site. Block A has a single storey, which is lowset at the west; and the ground underneath has been cut to form an understorey (enclosed space).

The first floor of blocks B and C are aligned with Block A. Blocks B and C both have open undercroft spaces at the west and understorey spaces at the east. The first floor of the buildings generally have rough-cast finished masonry walls with red face brick dressings, and red face brick walls to the undercroft and understorey level. The first floors of the blocks are connected by a continuous verandah which runs to the north of Block C, east of Block A and south of Block B. Various stairs provide access to the verandah; with two enclosed by face brick walls and forming the eastern ends of blocks B and C.

The verandahs on each level provide access to the interior spaces. The first floor verandahs have raked ceilings lined in timber v-jointed (VJ) boards, timber floors, square timber posts, timber post-and-rail balustrades, and brick verandah walls (some have been painted). Some sections of single-skin, weatherboard-clad timber walls (former hat racks) are retained; and teachers annexes are connected to the verandahs of Block A and Block C. Block B's verandah features a scalloped valance, eaves with exposed rafters, and timber-framed, wired-glass partitions at the eastern and western ends. Verandahs to the understorey level have flat ceilings lined with profiled and corrugated metal sheets, concrete slab floors, face brick columns and face brick verandah walls. Bag racks and modern louvre windows that enclose the verandahs are recent additions and are not of cultural heritage significance.

The interior spaces of the three blocks are linearly arranged, with almost all classrooms and offices leading off verandah spaces. On the first floor, Block A contains three classrooms of a similar size; Block B has six classrooms; and Block C has four classrooms, with two withdrawal rooms separating the outermost classrooms from innermost classrooms. Blocks B and C are each terminated at the eastern end by a store and staircase. The classroom spaces generally have plastered walls, timber picture rails, and plastered ceilings with painted timber battens, and ceiling vents. Most partition walls between classrooms have been partially removed, with remaining early sections featuring VJ timber board linings. Skirtings are of concrete and timber picture rails are featured in most rooms.

Block A's teachers annexe comprises three small offices / store rooms (the outer two are of a lighter construction). Block C's teachers room comprises a singular space, which has recently been divided by lightweight partitions to form toilet cubicles. The teachers rooms have plaster walls with VJ timber-lined ceilings; with the exception of the outer two rooms to Block A's teachers annexe, which have flat sheet-lined walls and ceilings.

The lower level of blocks A, B and C comprises an undercroft at the west, and understorey at the east. Block A is mostly open play space, with an early enclosure at the northwestern end, and enclosed store rooms beneath the teachers rooms. The western ends of blocks B and C are mainly open play space with early toilet / amenities enclosures. The eastern end of Block C has three classrooms, with the two easternmost divided by a folding partition (now removed), and terminated by an eastern staircase with store located under the stairs. Block B features two classrooms, with the easternmost being of a double classroom width, and eastern stair with store room under. The floor level of the easternmost classroom is tiered at the western end (former seating platforms relating to the use of the room as a One Teacher School). The classroom spaces generally have plastered walls, plastered ceilings with painted timber battens and concrete skirtings. All undercroft spaces feature face brick columns, which are rounded below head height.

Rare surviving early educational murals of painted text and images, on topics such as tourism, transport, farming, sugar cane, and Australian states, are painted directly onto the bulkheads and walls of classrooms in Block B. Most feature a detailed image with adjacent wording. Murals to the understorey classroom of Block B have been covered, although it is likely that these survive underneath the recent paint.

Most early timber joinery within the building has been retained, including: double-hung sash windows with awning fanlights to verandahs; casements and centre-pivoting windows with awning fanlights (some angled) to exterior walls; fixed louvres to the understorey level; dual timber panelled doors with stop-chamfered detailing and centre-pivoting fanlights; tall, centre-pivoting fanlights over verandah doors, and panelled, folding timber door partitions between some classrooms in Block B. Most windows feature horizontal painted concrete sills and lintels. Timber-framed, terracotta-tiled hoods shelter windows on the northern sides of all blocks, and on the western side of Block A.

=== Landscape Features ===
The school grounds are well established and comprise various mature trees, hard-scaping and courtyard spaces. Retaining walls and stairs terrace the site, down to a playing field at the east. Recent buildings are generally visually unified with the older school buildings through the use of red brickwork and tiled roofs.

A set of concrete stairs (1963) on the southern side of the playing field and a smaller set south of Block B, to the west of the swimming pool, provide access to the site from Massey Street.

A courtyard located between blocks A, B and C incorporates a covered play space, a modern sculpture garden and various mosaic artworks, none of which are of cultural heritage significance. A linear, paved and concreted space continues from the courtyard down to the playing field; and facilitates a visual axis across the length of the school site. Tall palm trees in the courtyard area are planted in rows, in line with the visual axis.

Mature trees including Poincianas (Delonix regia), silky oaks (Grevillea robusta), ironbarks (Eucalyptus sp.), tulipwoods (Harpullia pendula) and jacarandas (Jacaranda mimosifolia) are concentrated along the northern and eastern boundaries of the playing field. A mature mango tree (Mangifera sp.) is located at the northeastern end of the playing field.

Prominent views of the urban brick school buildings are available from Anthony and Pringle streets over open play spaces.

== Heritage listing ==
Ascot State School was listed on the Queensland Heritage Register on 7 April 2017 having satisfied the following criteria.

The place is important in demonstrating the evolution or pattern of Queensland's history.

Ascot State School (established in 1920) is important in demonstrating the evolution of state education and its associated architecture in Queensland. The place retains excellent, representative examples of standard government-designed school buildings, which were architectural responses to prevailing government educational philosophies, set in landscaped grounds with sporting facilities and mature trees.

Three urban brick school buildings (1920, 1923–39, 1928–34) represent the culmination of years of experimentation with natural light, classroom size and elevation by the Department of Public Works (DPW), and also demonstrate the growing preference in the early 20th century for constructing brick school buildings at metropolitan schools in developing suburbs. Additions to Blocks B and C undertaken during the 1930s are the result of the Queensland Government's building and relief work programmes during the 1930s, which stimulated the economy and provided work for men unemployed as a result of the Great Depression.

The suburban site with mature trees, sporting facilities and other landscaping features demonstrates educational policies that promoted the importance of play and a beautiful environment in the education of children.

The place demonstrates rare, uncommon or endangered aspects of Queensland's cultural heritage.

The 1930s educational murals, painted on the interior classroom walls of Block B are rare educational practice. Intact and distinctive, they are the only known murals of this kind in Queensland.

The place is important in demonstrating the principal characteristics of a particular class of cultural places.

Ascot State School is important in demonstrating the principal characteristics of a Queensland state school with later modifications. These include: teaching buildings constructed to individual designs; and generous, landscaped sites, with mature trees, assembly and play areas, and sporting facilities.

The urban brick school buildings are intact, excellent examples of individually designed urban brick school buildings. They demonstrate the principal characteristics of this type through their highset form; linear layout, with classrooms and teachers rooms accessed by verandahs; undercrofts used as open play spaces and understoreys for additional classrooms; loadbearing, masonry construction, with face brick piers to undercroft spaces; and roof fleches. They demonstrate use of the stylistic features of their era, which determined their roof form, decorative treatment and joinery. Typically, urban brick school buildings are configured to create central courtyards, and are located in suburban areas that were growing at the time of their construction.

The place is important because of its aesthetic significance.

The urban brick school buildings at Ascot State School have aesthetic significance due to their beautiful attributes: identifiable by their symmetrical layout; consistent form; scale; materials; elegant composition; finely crafted timber work; and decorative treatment.

These buildings remain intact and demonstrate a continuation of site planning ideals initiated by the placing of the original urban brick school building in a prominent position at the top of the sloping site. The beauty of the school's setting is enhanced by mature trees and formal landscaping elements such as retaining walls and stairs.

The buildings are also significant for their contribution to the Anthony and Pringle Streets' streetscape.

The place has a strong or special association with a particular community or cultural group for social, cultural or spiritual reasons.

Schools have always played an important part in Queensland communities. They typically retain significant and enduring connections with former pupils, parents, and teachers; provide a venue for social interaction and volunteer work; and are a source of pride, symbolising local progress and aspirations.

Ascot State School has a strong and ongoing association with the surrounding community. It developed from 1920 through the fundraising efforts of the local community and generations of Ascot children have been taught there. The place is important for its contribution to the educational development of its suburban district and is a prominent community focal point and gathering place for social and commemorative events with widespread community support.

== Notable students ==
- Nick Earls, author
- Henry George Fryberg, judge of the Supreme Court of Queensland
- Ashley Harrison, Australian rugby league player
- Stephanie Rice, Olympic swimmer
- Grace Shaw, musician
- Avra Velis, musician

== See also ==
- History of state education in Queensland
- List of schools in Greater Brisbane
