= Town of Hamilton =

Local government area of Queensland, Australia 1904–1925

Coordinates: 27.437603°S 153.064546°E

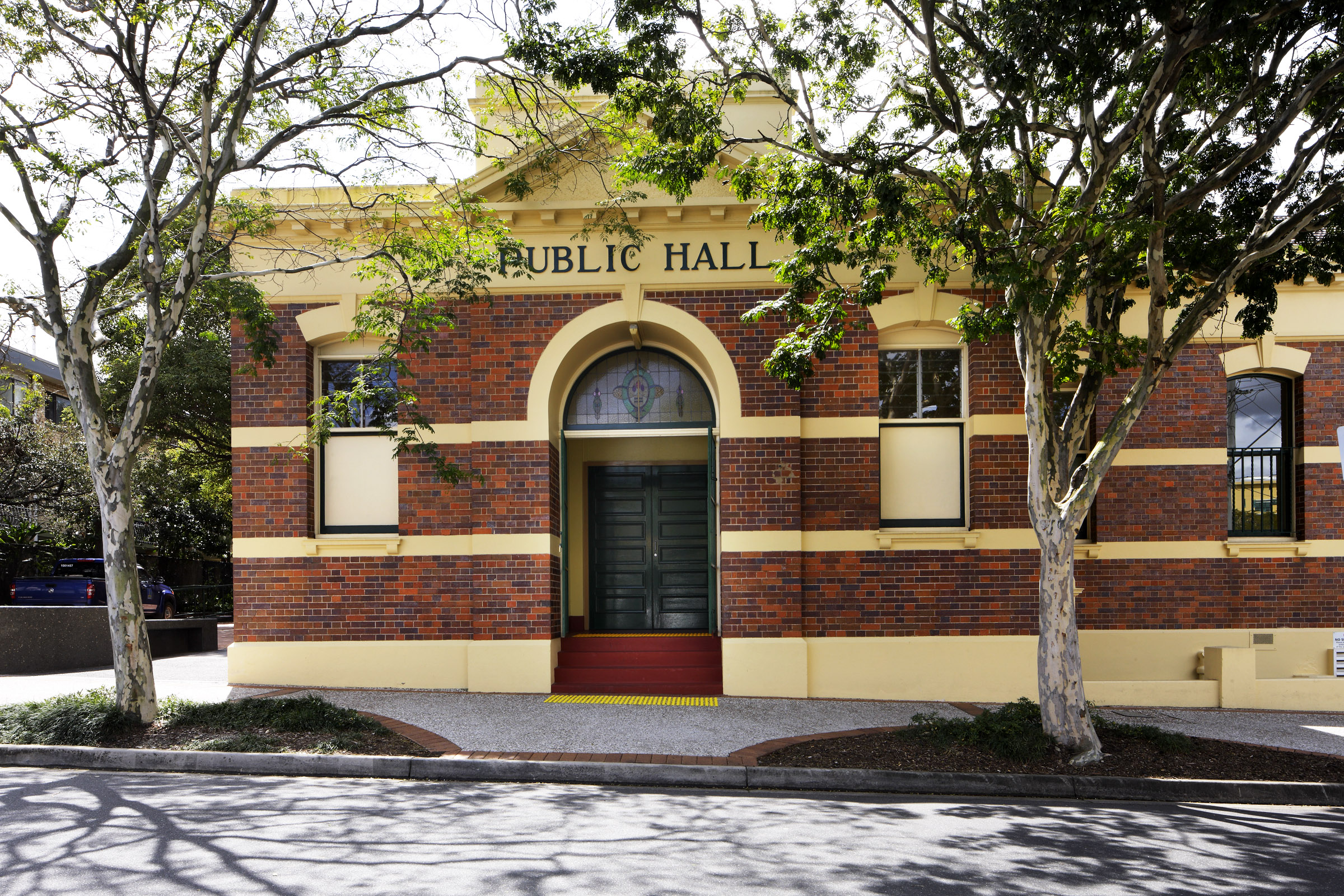
Hamilton Town Hall, viewed from Rossiter Parade, Hamilton, in 2011

The Town of Hamilton is a former local government area of Queensland, Australia, located in north-eastern Brisbane.

== History ==
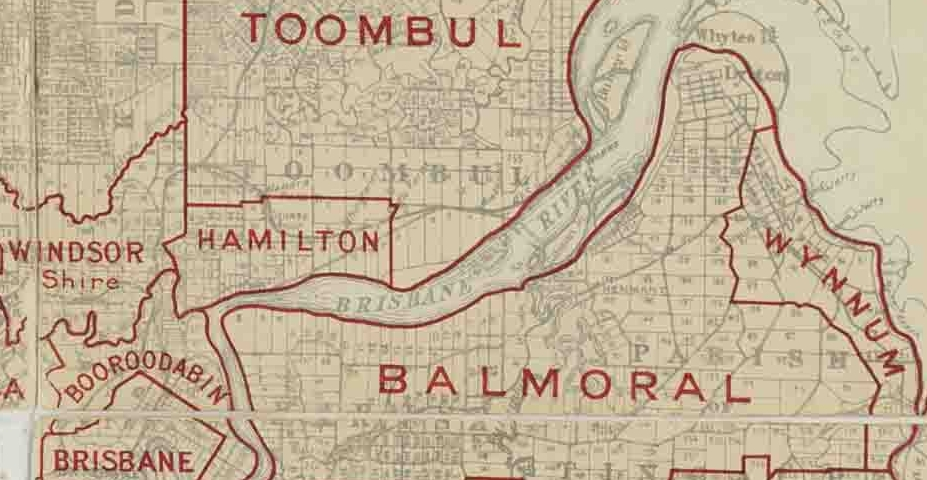
Map of Hamilton Division and adjacent local government areas, March 1902

The Divisional Boards Act 1879 established Divisional Boards as a form of local government for area outside the boundaries of recognised municipalities. The Kedron Division was one of those initially established on 11 November 1879, but on 3 November 1883 the Toombul Division was separated from the Kedron Division. Following agitation by Toombul board member Andrew Lang Petrie, the Hamilton Division was then separated from the Toombul Division on 2 October 1890 and Petrie become its first chairman.

In 1902, the Local Authorities Act 1902 replaced all divisions with towns and shires, creating the Shire of Hamilton on 31 March 1903.

In 1904, it was proclaimed the Town of Hamilton.

In 1925, it was amalgamated into the City of Brisbane.

== Hamilton Town Hall ==
The Hamilton Town Hall was built in 1920 and is located at the north-west corner of the intersection of Racecourse Road and Rossiter Street, Hamilton. After the amalgamation into the City of Brisbane, the Hamilton Town Hall was used as a School of Arts. In World War II it was used by the Australian Army. After the war, the Hamilton branch of the Brisbane City Council library was located in the building, a role which continues to the present day. There are also meeting rooms available for use by community groups.

The town hall was listed on the Queensland Heritage Register in 2005.

== Chairmen and mayors ==
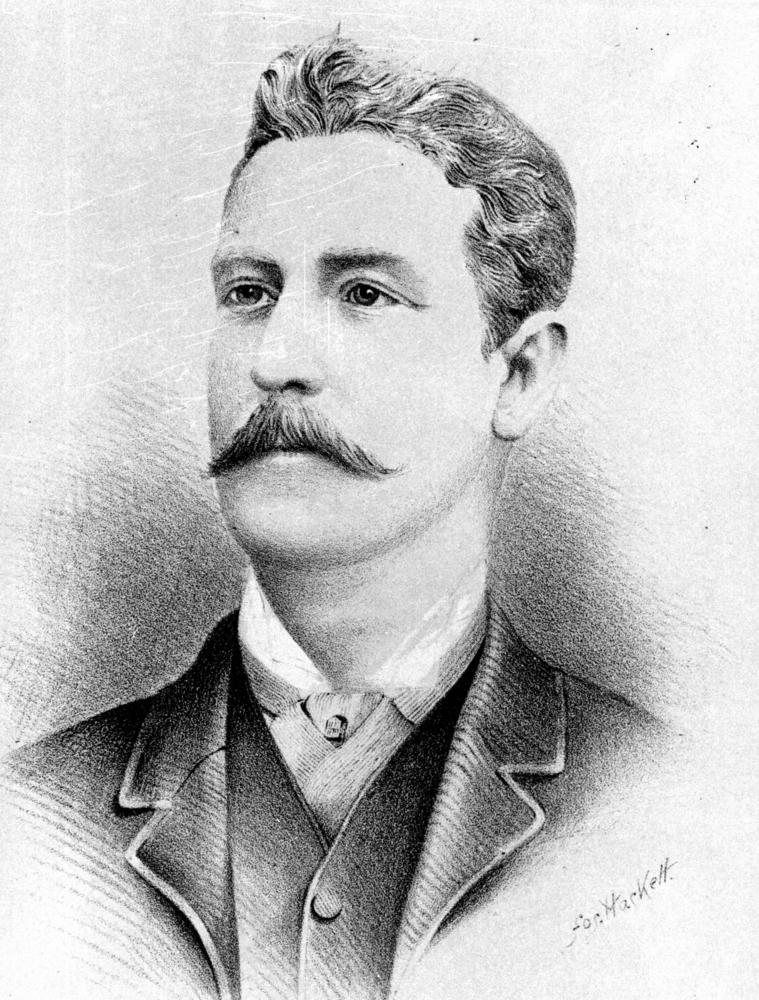
Sketch of Andrew Lang Petrie

The list of chairmen (to 1902) and mayors (1903–1925) include:

- 1891: Andrew Lang Petrie
- 1903: John Brett Charlton
- 1905–1906: George Samuel Hutton
- 1907–1908: John Appel
- 1909–1910: Charles Edward Lever
- 1911: John Irving
- 1912–1913: Isaac William Butters
- 1914–1915: Hugh Russell
- 1916–1917: C. W. Campbell
- 1918–1920: George Rees
- 1921–1924: Charles Moffatt Jenkinson
- 1924: Frederick Annand (the first City of Brisbane town clerk)
- 1924–1925: George Waugh
