= Richard Windeyer (barrister) =

Australian barrister

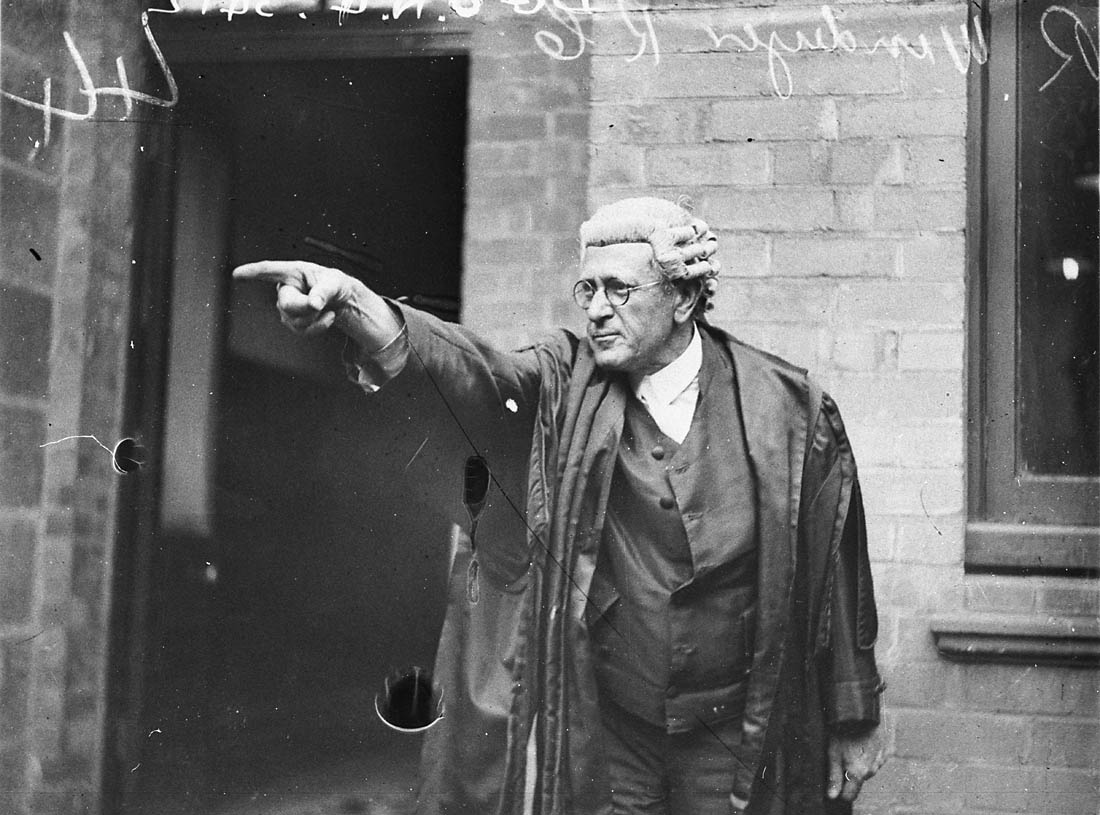
- Richard Windeyer, KC, circa 1930
- Born: September 9, 1868
- Died: November 8, 1959 (aged 91)
- Relatives: Charles Windeyer(great grandfather); Richard Windeyer (grandfather); William Charles Windeyer (father); Margaret Windeyer (sister); Brian Windeyer (son); Victor Windeyer (nephew)

Richard Windeyer KC (9 September 1868 – 8 November 1959) was an Australian barrister.

== Early life and education ==
Windeyer was born at Darlinghurst in Sydney to William Charles Windeyer and Mary Elizabeth, née Bolton.

He and his brother William Archibald attended Sydney Grammar School and the University of Sydney, from which Richard graduated with a Bachelor of Arts in 1891. They had seven children: Marian Fuller (1893-1983), Lois Elwood (1895-1975), Charles (1897-1917, killed in action during the first World War), Richard Michael (1898-1984), Humphrey Camfield (1899—?), Guy (1900-1984). His youngest son was Professor Sir Brian Wellingham Windeyer (1904-1994), who became Professor of Therapeutic Radiology at the Middlesex Hospital Medical School, University of London 1942–69, and Vice-Chancellor of the University of London (1969–72).

== Career ==
In 1892 he was appointed judge's associate to his father, and on 10 August 1894 he was called to the Bar. In 1917 he was appointed King's Counsel and he acted as a Supreme Court judge from November 1936 to February 1937.

Windeyer appeared in many notable cases, significantly for Percy Brookfield, Thomas Mutch and Ernie Judd in 1918 when they appealed against the conspiracy trials of members of the Industrial Workers of the World in 1916. He was also counsel in the Australian Newspaper Proprietors' Association's successful case against Arthur Calwell's censorship laws during World War II. He retired in 1946.

Windeyer was a supporter of Federation and of Edmund Barton but never gained party preselection, although he contested Warringah at the 1929 federal election as an independent Australian People's Party candidate, coming close to defeating sitting Nationalist Archdale Parkhill. He was also involved with the University of Sydney, lecturing from 1935 to 1944. His wife petitioned for divorce in 1919 but the couple eventually settled on a modus vivendi. Windeyer died at Gordon in 1959.
