= Hamilton Town Hall, Brisbane =

Hamilton Town Hall
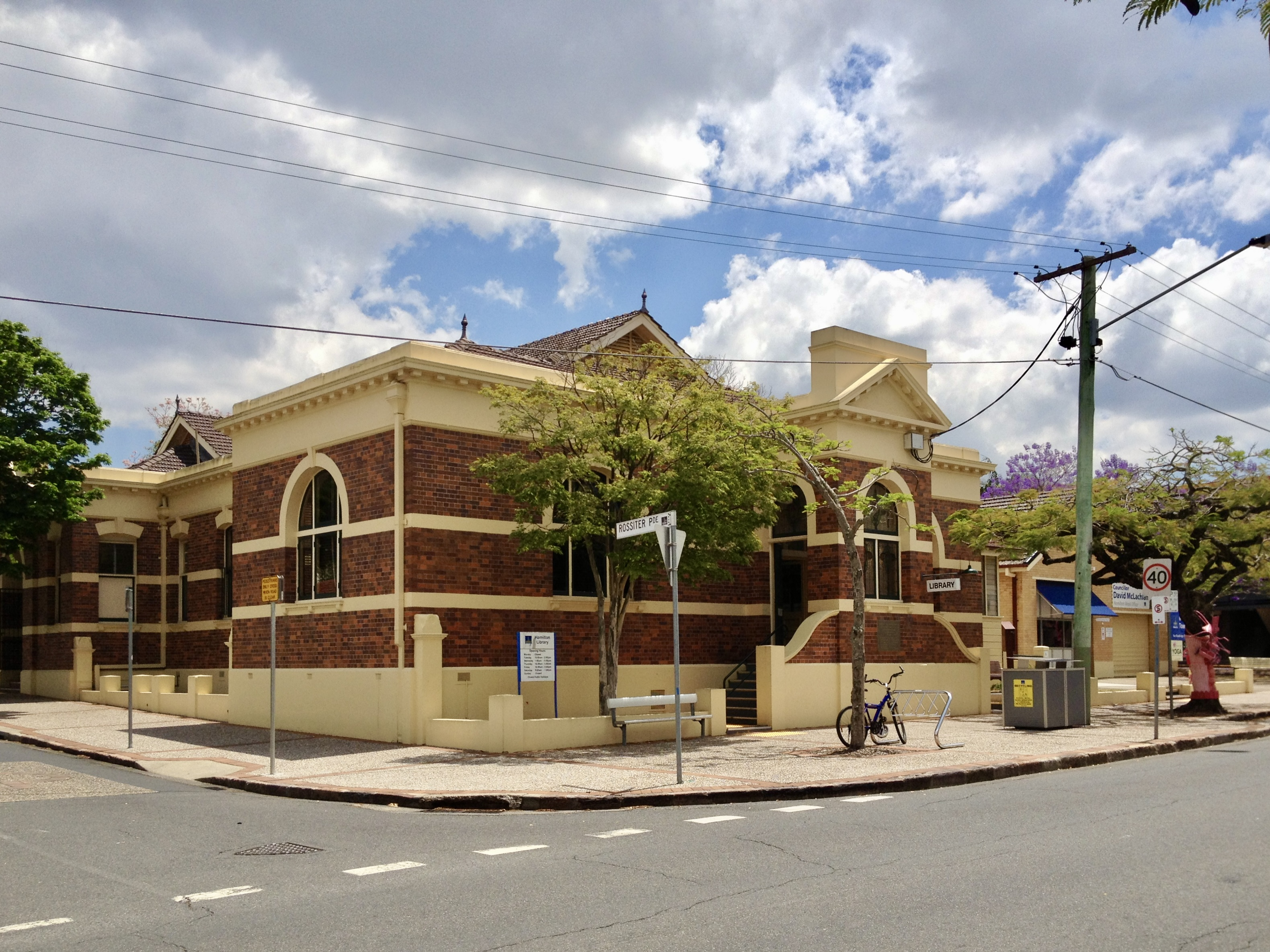
- Hamilton Town Hall, 2013

- Location within Queensland Location within Australia
- 27.4378°S 153.0642°E
- Location: 36–42 Racecourse Road, Hamilton, Queensland, Australia

History
- Design period: 1919–1930s (interwar period)
- Built: 1919–1920

Site notes
- Architect: Montague Talbot Stanley

Queensland Heritage Register
- Official name: Hamilton Town Hall
- Type: state heritage (built)
- Designated: 6 April 2005
- Reference no.: 602444
- Significant period: 1920 (fabric); 1920–1925 (historical); 1927– ongoing (social)
- Significant components: hall, dining room, strong room

Hamilton Town Hall is a heritage-listed former town hall at 36–42 Racecourse Road, Hamilton, Queensland, Australia. It was designed by Montague Talbot Stanley and built from 1919 to 1920. It was added to the Queensland Heritage Register on 6 April 2005.

== History ==
The Hamilton Town Hall, a single-storey brick building comprising council chambers and public hall, was erected in 1920 for the Hamilton Town Council. It was designed by Montague Talbot Stanley, and is one eight remaining town halls from the twenty that were built prior to the formation of Greater Brisbane in 1925.

When Moreton Bay was opened for free settlement in 1842, local government was controlled from Sydney, using British Imperial Government policy. The Municipality of Brisbane was not proclaimed until 1859, and the first council was elected in the same year. As settlements sprang up around Brisbane a desire for separate municipality status developed, and in 1879 the Divisional Boards Act provided for a number of new autonomous authorities adjacent to Brisbane. By 1891, 21 local authorities had been created in the Brisbane metropolitan area under this legislation. These consisted of the City of Brisbane as well as a municipality, shires, divisions, and one borough.

In 1890, the Hamilton Division separated from Toombul Division, although the Hamilton Divisional Board initially conducted its business from the Toombul Divisional Board Offices. Andrew Petrie was appointed the first chairman. The board became a Town Council in 1904 and the first mayor was John Brett Charlton. In 1917 the council purchased 64 perches (1,600 m^{2}) (approximately 1600 square metres) of land in Racecourse Road with the intention of building council chambers and a public hall. In 1919 plans and specifications for the new building were received from Montague Stanley, son of Francis Drummond Greville Stanley, the well-known Queensland Colonial Architect. At a special meeting, amendments were made, including a wider front door and the use of Australian manufactured materials. A tender from Messrs McArthur & Walker for £6,894 was accepted and the current mayor Alderman George Rees laid the foundation stone on 26 September 1919. Extra walling and iron railing with a double gate along Racecourse Road was added to the plan and the building was completed in 1920 for a cost of £8,873.

The town hall accommodated council officers as well as providing council chambers and a public hall. There were a kitchen and a strong room, but it is not known if the supper room was constructed at this time. An honour board for local residents who had contributed to World War I was erected in the council offices.

With rapid population increases, small local governments found it ever more difficult to fund and administer their responsibilities effectively and economically. The development of services such as roads, transport, water supply and sewerage could only be efficiently managed by an overarching authority. A move to amalgamate local authorities began in 1902 when the Booroodabin Division was absorbed into the City of Brisbane. The idea of amalgamation was promoted throughout the 1900s and culminated in the City of Brisbane Act of 1924, when Hamilton was one of the towns and shires who joined to form the Brisbane City Council. The first Greater Brisbane Council was elected on 21 February 1925 and the Hamilton Town Council was disbanded.

The Hamilton Town Hall then became the property of the Brisbane City Council and since that time has had various uses. During 1925–1926 it is recorded as a council depot in the Post Office directories. From 1927 it was known as the School of Arts and provided a venue for social events. The building was headquarters for the Australian Army Survey Corps during World War II. After the war, major alterations were made to the council chambers to create the Hamilton Municipal Library. The hall continued to be used for various social activities. Additions were made to the northern end of the hall in 1973 to accommodate the mobile library service. Further changes in 1987 included alterations to the dressing room and a covered walkway between the Supper Room and the hall. The former town hall still houses the city council's Hamilton library and it is used by an amateur theatrical group and by other local groups for meetings and social activities. Though its use as a venue for functions and gatherings and as a local library, the building has long associations with the cultural and social life of the area.

== Description ==
The former Hamilton Town Hall is on a corner block, with the entrance to the library from Racecourse Road and the entrance to the hall from Rossiter Parade. It consists of a series of linked single-storey structures comprising the original brick main building (hall and library), a timber supper room, and the 1973 brick annexe. The main building is a load-bearing face brick structure with a timber-framed floor and a timber-framed terracotta tiled roof. Externally the building features English-bond face brickwork contrasted by a rendered base, string courses and entablature. Both street elevations are emphasized by a pedimented frontispiece. The original balustraded parapet is now missing, as are the metal palisades and gates to both street alignments.

=== Library (formerly council chambers) ===
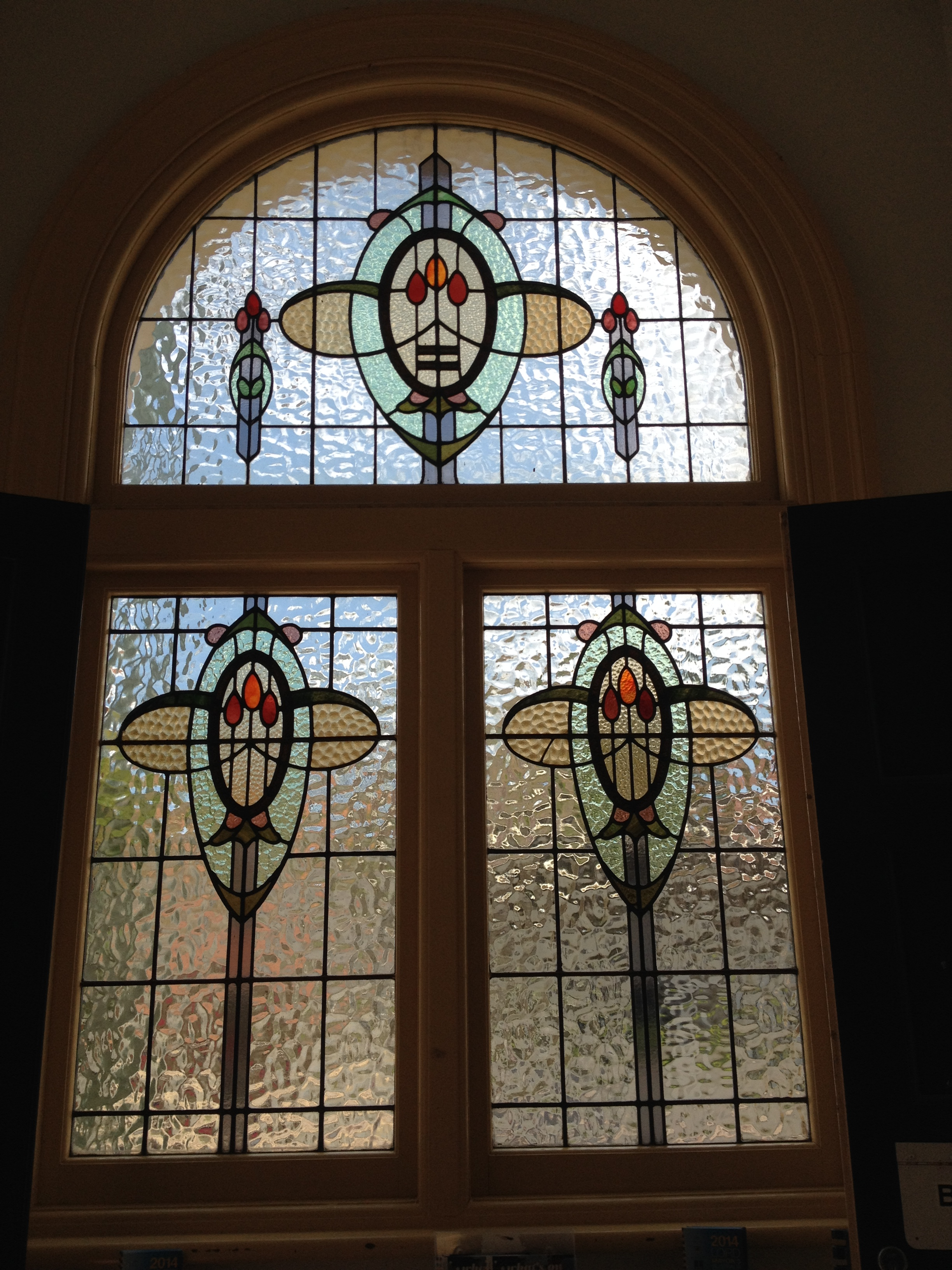
Stained glass at entry, 2013

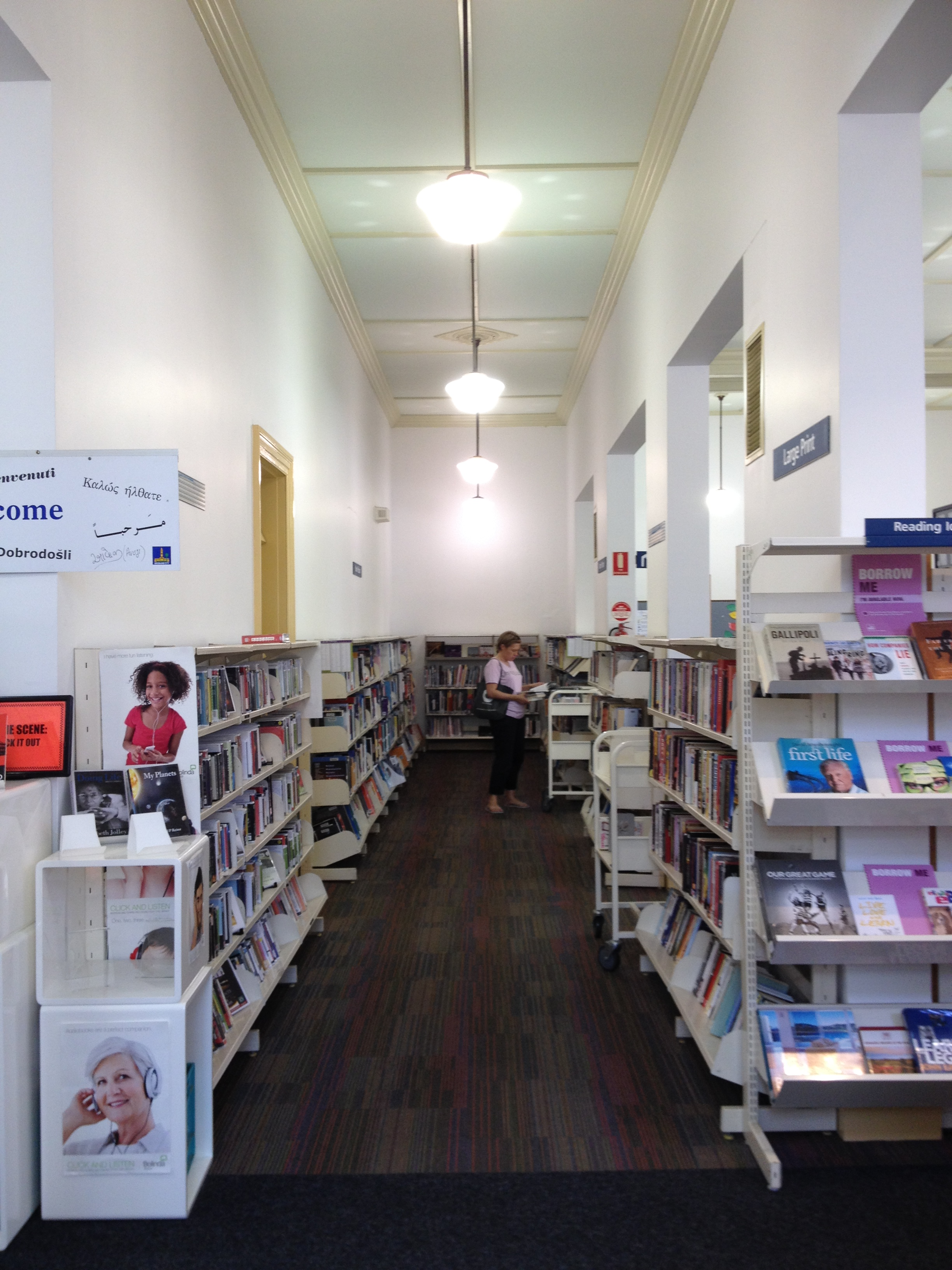
Library at Hamilton Town Hall, 2013

The entrance to the library consists of a vestibule with Art Nouveau-styled leaded glass windows and tessellated/encaustic floor tiles. Some floor tiles are replicas laid down in 2004. Only a small section of the border pattern consists of the original tiles, the others being specially made replicas laid in 2004. Panels in the French doors opening into the library and sections on either side of the doors are all matching leadlight.

Internally, the Library has been substantially altered by the removal of walls and doorways. However, the "Reliance" strongroom with steel doors remains in working order. The main windows to both street facades are original Diocletian windows and sashes. The interior features shallow coffered ceilings with plaster rose. Picture rails remain in some rooms, and the section of the library with the strongroom is half paneled. The original open verandah to the north of the library has been unsympathetically enclosed with timber boarding and glass louvres.

=== Hall and Supper Room ===
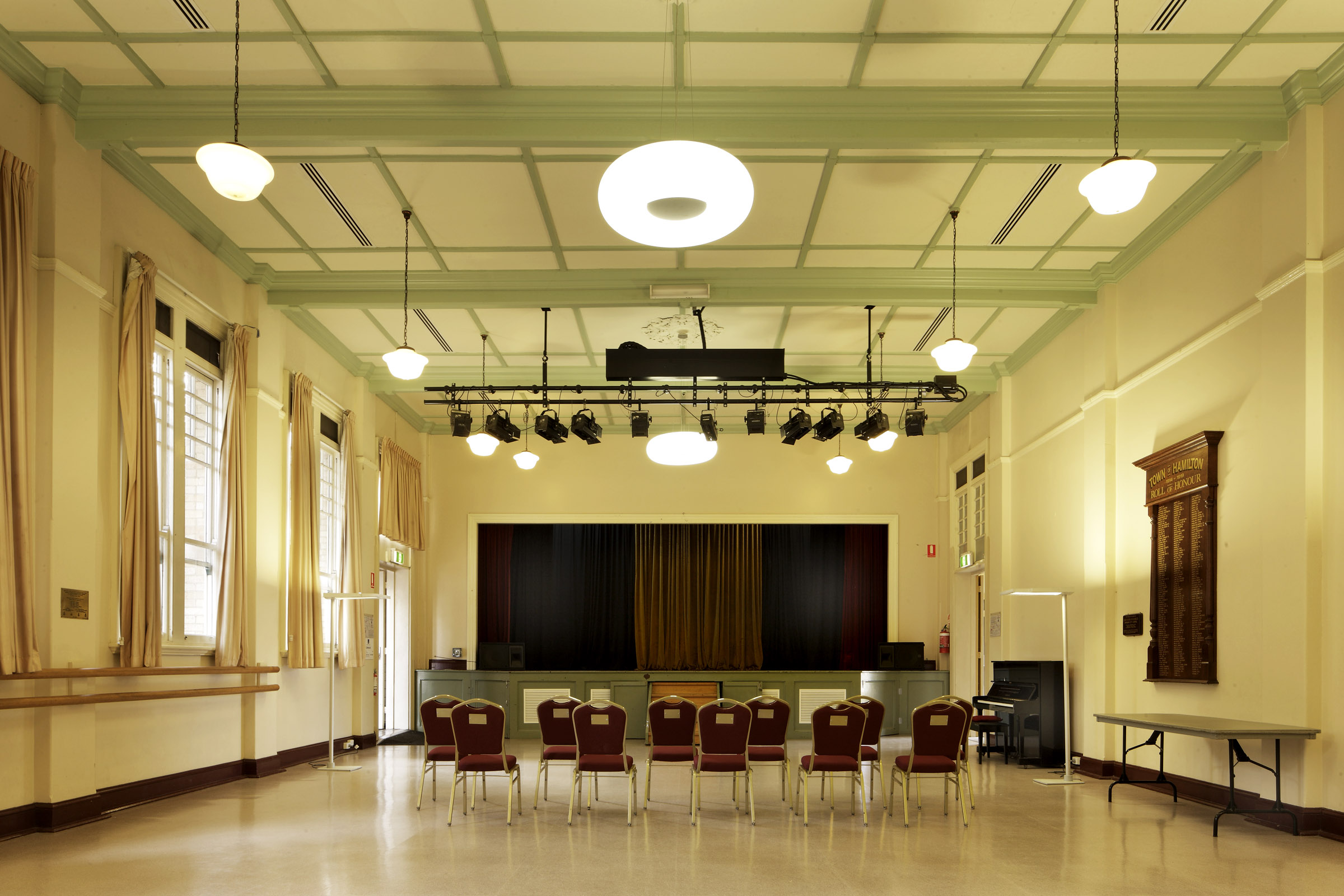
Hall and stage

The hall, across the rear of the library, is much more intact and features a fibrous plaster ceiling with coffered timber beams. Two large roof ventilators are built into the hall roof.

The supper room is a small single-storey timber-framed weatherboard-clad structure with a timber floor close to the ground, paired casement windows, and a gabled corrugated iron roof. Internally, the supper room is an open space with cupboards and a sink underneath the windows at the rear of the room. It is linked to the hall by a dressing room, and a recently constructed covered walkway (without heritage significance) incorporating ornate timber detailing which is neither original nor authentic and has unsympathetically altered two of the original large hall windows.

=== Annexe ===
The Mobile Library Service Annexe is a modern cavity brick concrete slab on ground structure with a tiled roof. The building in its scale, form, materials and detailing are all unsympathetic to the main building to which it is attached. It is not considered to have any heritage significance.

== Heritage listing ==
Hamilton Town Hall was listed on the Queensland Heritage Register on 6 April 2005 having satisfied the following criteria.

The place is important in demonstrating the evolution or pattern of Queensland's history.
Hamilton Town Hall is important in demonstrating the pattern of Brisbane's development, in particular the construction of civic buildings for the local authorities that predated the formation of the Brisbane City Council in 1925. It is important for its association with the development of the Hamilton district, and is evidence for its growth and prosperity in the early twentieth century.
The place is important in demonstrating the principal characteristics of a particular class of cultural places.
Hamilton Town Hall is important as a good example a town hall of the Interwar period.
The place is important because of its aesthetic significance.
As a handsome and well-composed public building on a prominent site, Hamilton Town Hall is important for its landmark quality and its formal two-street facade makes a substantial contribution to the character of the area.
The place has a strong or special association with a particular community or cultural group for social, cultural or spiritual reasons.
Hamilton Town Hall is important to the community. The building has social significance as a centrally located civic building which has been a focal point for social and community functions for over eighty years.
