= Royal Commission regarding the contract for the erection of additions to the General Post Office, Sydney =

Enquiry into work on the Sydney GPO

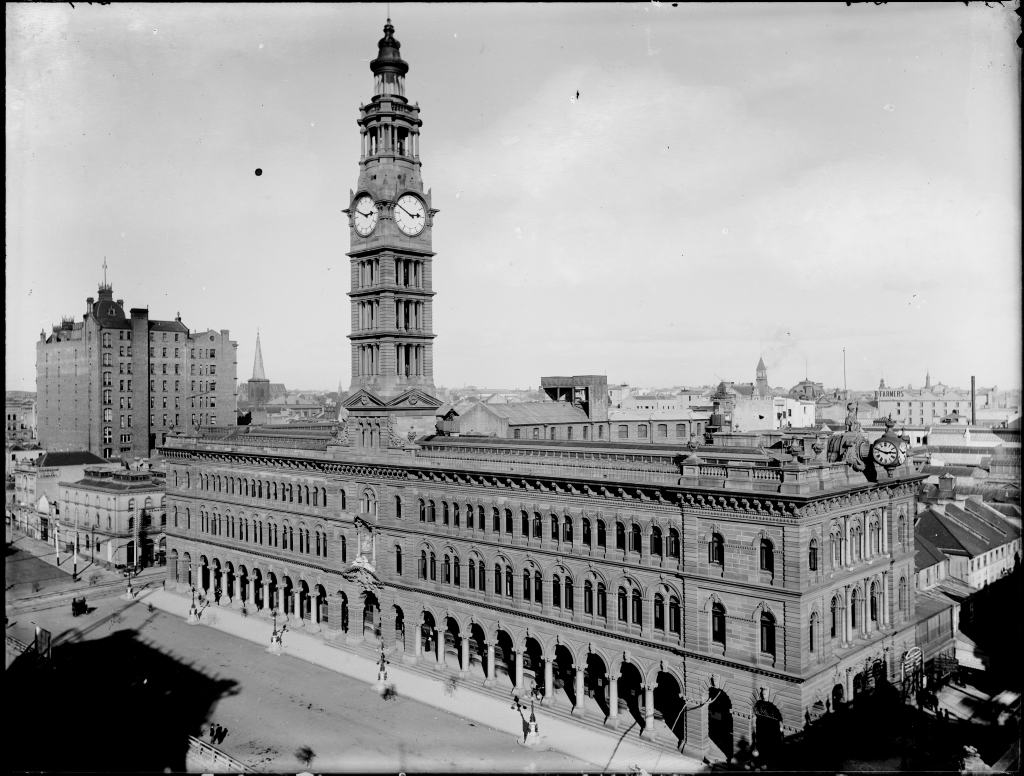
Sydney GPO building

On 2 June 1939 the Menzies government agreed to the creation of a Royal Commission to look into the £400,000 contract for extensions to the Sydney GPO. On 8 June 1939 the terms of reference for the Royal Commission into the expansion works were released. The enquiry was held under Justice Allan Victor Maxwell KC with Victor Windeyer council assisting, with the final report given in September 1939.

== Background ==
The terms of reference were announced on 8 June 1939 covering the calling and handling of tenders including contract signing and any other connected matters.

== Hearings ==
In June 1939 there was discussion about terracotta facings. Then on 27 June there was discussion of the replacement of Sydney sandstone with white sandstone which made the tender less competitive and was the responsibility of the Works Department in NSW.

During hearings in Canberra it was announced that the Chief Government Architect, Edwin Hubert Henderson, committed suicide the day before he was due to give testimony.

== Report and aftermath ==
The report found no suspicion of bribery but did criticise the Commonwealth Director of Works, Maurice William Mehaffey, for failing to act on the directions of the Prime Minister not to sign the contract as the direction not to sign the contract did not reach James Orwin, the Works Director in Sydney, until after the contract had been signed.

There were also proposals for a re-organisation of the Works Branch and suspending staff accused of serious misconduct before reporting them to the Public Service Board who will then appoint a committee to investigate.

The Royal Commission was estimated to cost £10,000.
