= Avra (singer) =

Background information
- Born: Avra Velis; Brisbane, Queensland, Australia
- Origin: Adelaide, South Australia, Australia
- Genres: Pop; dance-pop; club; electronica; pop rock; synthpop; disco; Greek; alternative rock
- Occupation: Singer
- Instruments: Vocals; piano; guitar
- Years active: 1982–present
- Formerly of: Virginia Wolf
- Website: avra.co

Avra Velis, known mononymously as Avra, is a Greek-Australian singer. She is known for her ambitious music videos and stage performances as well as her poetic, thought provoking lyrics.

Since her debut in 1982, Avra has released numerous singles and albums. She has written and appeared in several theatre productions and stage performances, including at the Melbourne Fringe Festival.

== Early life ==
Avra Velis was born in Brisbane as an only child to Greek parents, who had immigrated from the islands of Kythera and Ithaca. Her mother enrolled her in after school piano lessons, speech and drama classes, whilst also studying Greek language and culture. Avra attended weekly theatrical productions covering a diversity of genres by various artists, Maria Callas, Liberace, Dame Joan Sutherland, Barbra Streisand, Billy Joel, Kate Bush, Marcel Marceau, Mikis Theodorakis, and Lindsay Kemp.

Avra attended Ascot State School and Brisbane State High School where she excelled in drama, debating and English. After secondary education, she moved to Adelaide to complete a Bachelor of Education. Writing and creating music remained an important aspect of her life. She taught secondary English and drama at several South Australian schools, writing numerous school productions. Avra left the school system after four years to pursue interests in the commercial music industry.

== Musical career ==
In the late 1980s Avra formed her first band, Virginia Wolf, with her partner Steve Sutton, a guitarist, songwriter and author. The collaboration produced work which led them to win the West End Battle of the Bands, a contest held in South Australia. Avra contributed, with Joanne Allis and Harry Beach, to The Call to Worship: Songbook, in 1994, which is a set of sacred choruses and songs with piano; it was published by Noiseworks Enterprises. In 1998 she entered the track, "Now About You", for the Songwriters, Composers and Lyricists Association (SCALA) Festival of Original Music Song Competition (FOOM), which appeared on their compilation album, SCALA: Play Those Songs (1999). The track was the co-winner of the Demo Section of the competition. Also that year her track, "Crazy Over You', was Highly Recommended in the Master Section, it was compiled on SCALA: Steps (28 June 2000).

On 13 March 2001, Avra record material at the Full Bench studio with herself on lead vocals and Illias Archondoulis on oud and Greek percussion; Sophia Archondoulis and Darren Mullen on keyboards; Peter Grimwood on guitar; Lee McAllistair and Jayne-Anne Power on backing vocals; John McDermott on drums; and Damien Steele Scott on guitars. It was released as her first album, a live-in-the-studio effort, Avra in Session, later that year. All eleven tracks were written by Avra. It was recorded in front of an audience and produced by Andrew Bayfield and Tim Power.

One of its tracks, "Being Elvis", was entered in the FOOM competition for 2002 and was highly commended in the Live section. It was compiled on SCALA: Living in the Mainstream (3 April 2004). Also on that compilation is her track, "Baby Kiss Me Now", which had been recorded live at the Directors Hotel on 15 June 2002 with Avra on vocals and electric piano and was engineered by Darren Zaza. In late 2002 Avra released a solo album, Innate, to build awareness of chiropractic work and innate healing. The album was commissioned by an international chiropractic organisation. It was distributed throughout Australia, New Zealand and the United States.

After that album, Avra returned to her Greek heritage, and over the next three years, she collaborated with various Adelaide-based Greek artists and organisations, including a series of concerts sponsored by the Greeks of Egypt and Middle East Society. She performed at the Adelaide Festival Centre, the Royalty Theatre and the Adelaide Convention Centre. One of the shows, "Greeks of the Sea", was invited to be part of the Sydney Greek Festival (Paniyiri) Program. Avra performed regularly on a local level at the Cypriot Club and other Adelaide Greek music venues, as well as guest appearances at several Greek clubs in Melbourne.

Another project was her "Avralicious Show", where she performed a parody of the rock diva persona. This inspired her to release a six-track extended play, Superalterego. She worked with Scott as her producer. A national tour followed which included a same titled show at the Melbourne Fringe Festival from September to October 2003.

The EP shifted over 5000 units (pending verification). Avra's backing band were Velis on lead vocals and piano with John Doe on keyboards, Ben Palmer on guitar, Jarrod Payne on drums and Corey Stewart on backing vocals and bass guitar.

In 2004, Avra co-produced the "Avra – The Musical" which opened at the Judith Wright Centre of Contemporary Arts in July. The script, and the lyrics for all 16 songs, were written by Avra, whilst the musical composition and production marked her first collaboration with dance musician, Kevin Freeman. Set to video screen backdrops created by Tim Rith and lighting designed by Hamish Cliff, it was a combination of dance and theatre.(citation pending) A 20-track CD was recorded and sold at the show, Avra – The Musical – Songs from the Musical.

Avra and two cast members take a moment out from filming the "Fashion Police" video. (December 2006)

Avra continued to work with Freeman on his project, "Thousand Ears", in 2006; they recorded several songs together including a dance track, "Fashion Police". The song, written by Avra and produced by Freeman, is a tongue in cheek commentary on the nature of fashion and its industry (citation pending). Extensive motion tracked 3D animation was used in combination with 3D titles and effects, marking a dramatic departure from basic, utilitarian style music videos. The song was featured in the 2008 Australian Big Brother TV series.

=== 2010s work ===
In 2010, Avra collaborated with George "Yiorgo" Bousias, an Australian bouzouki player for the album, Avra and Yiorgo, (2011). It was conceived and produced by Freeman. The album is a collection of Greek and English songs predominantly written by Avra. It included a track, "Elevtheria", jointly written by Velis, Bousias and Freeman, as well as a ballad, "Sam's Song" written by Bousias about his daughter. The album was released at the Paniyiri Greek Festival in Brisbane.

In 2014, Avra returned to her singer-songwriter roots and released a live acoustic EP, Tricky Little Life sSongs”, a collection of songs on the Tall Poppy Productions label, which were written during the final months of her father's life. The song, "Days", was released as a single in 2015 along with her next album, Big Little Word. Avra also continued with her work as a freelance fashion stylist.

Avra helped fund a homeless centre, Club 139, in Fortitude Valley and ran a charity drive, Chuck in Your Towel, in March 2016 to sponsor the centre. She promoted the charity on Triple M Brisbane's Marto and Ed for Breakfast radio program.

== Discography ==
=== Albums ===
- Avra in Session (2001)
- Innate (late 2002)
- Avra – The Musical – Songs from the Musical (2004)
- Avra and Yiorgo (by Avra and George Bousias) (2011)
- Big Little Word (2015)

=== Extended plays ===
- Superalterego (2003)
- Tricky Little Life Songs (2014)
