= Henry George Fryberg =

Australian judge

Judge of the Supreme Court of Queensland
- In office 23 September 1994 – 28 November 2013

Personal details
- Born: November 1943 (age 82–83)

Justice Henry George Fryberg was a Justice of the Supreme Court of Queensland, Australia.

Fryberg was sworn in on 23 September 1994, and retired in 2013.

== Early life and education ==
Henry George Fryberg was born on 29 November 1943 in Brisbane, to Lt Col Abraham Fryberg, then acting director-general of health, and his wife Vivian Greensill (née Barnard). Fryberg completed his primary education at Ascot State School (1949–57) and his secondary education at Brisbane Grammar School (1958–61)

He studied at the University of Queensland, graduating Bachelor of Arts with honours (1965) and a Bachelor of Laws with honours (1967). He was awarded the Wilkinson Memorial Prize and the Henderson Prize for law.

== Career ==
On 13 December 1967, Fryberg was admitted as a barrister of the Supreme Court of Queensland and in New South Wales, Papua New Guinea, the Northern Territory, Western Australia and the Solomon Islands. Fryberg served as associate to Victor Windeyer of the High Court of Australia (1968–70), before commencing practice at the bar in Brisbane. Fryberg took silk in Queensland on 1 December 1983, in New South Wales (1988) and the Northern Territory (1992).

On 23 September 1994, Fryberg was appointed a judge of the Supreme Court of Queensland. He also served on the Land Appeal Court (1995–96) and the Medical Assessment Tribunal (1996–2001) and has taught leading evidence in the bar practice course since the 1980s.

Fryberg retired in 2013 after reaching the mandatory retirement age of 70.

== Notable Cases ==
=== Brisbane City Council v. Mathews ===
Brisbane City Council v Mathews, involved an application brought under the Vexatious Proceedings Act as a result of the numerous proceedings brought by the respondent Mathews against the Brisbane City Council (BCC) and other parties. Mathews was a disability pensioner as a result of a head injury he had sustained many years before, and his injuries affected his ability to concentrate for long periods. Justice Fryberg heard the application before all chamber applications in the list that day in order to assist the respondent, who was self-represented, in being able to present his case. After noting that Mathews had brought multiple proceedings, Justice Fryberg found that they were vexatious under the meaning of the Act:

The features of the proceedings to which I have been referred generally are in my view accurately summarised by [counsel for the applicant]. There is a joinder of multiple defendants without any basis for joinder; there are allegations of bias against judges which are completely unsubstantiated (and I should add that the allegations made orally before me today included allegations of bias against the lady who is now the Chief Judge of the District Court and also against the lady who is the Governor); there is the making of hopeless claims; there are unparticularised allegations of deceit and fraud; there are exaggerated damages claims; there is non-compliance with Court proceedings and in particular a failure to deliver complying pleadings; and finally, there is bringing of claims in respect of which it is not possible to demonstrate the suffering of any loss.

As a result, Justice Fryberg declared Mathews a vexatious litigant and made an order prohibiting him from commencing any new proceedings against BCC.

=== Legal Services Commissioner v Quinn ===
The case of Legal Services Commissioner v Quinn, concerned a Discipline Application brought against a solicitor in the Legal Services Tribunal. The Application followed Quinn’s guilty plea and conviction for importing child pornography, possessing a child abuse computer game and possessing child abuse photographs in the District Court of Queensland in 2007. The Application was brought by the Legal Services Commission following the convictions. Justice Fryberg’s judgment was delivered ex tempore and was notably brief, since this was an extremely uncomplicated case for the tribunal. At the hearing, His Honour stated that:

I am satisfied that the respondent was guilty of professional misconduct. I recommend that the name of the respondent be removed from the local roll... I order that the respondent pay the applicant's costs of the application assessed as for a Supreme Court application.

As a result, Quinn’s entitlement to practise was removed.

=== R v Bruce Gordon Ward ===
The accused, a surgeon, was accused of negligently cutting a patient's vein during an operation and prescribing blood-thinning drugs that hastened her death.

On 5 March 2009, a hearing took place in order to resolve disclosure issues, as well as when the trial would be held. His Honour rejected the proposed directions submitted by the defence because they would not provide sufficient disclosure to the prosecution of the expert evidence to be presented by the defence.

In August 2009, new evidence emerged from nurses, leading to Justice Fryberg suggesting that the case against the accused was not strong enough to likely lead to conviction. The prosecution subsequently dropped the charge, and so Ward was acquitted.

=== R v Patel ===
In 2013, Justice Fryberg presided over the retrial of former Bundaberg surgeon Jayant Patel for one of the manslaughter charges, which sat for 22 days and heard from 25 witnesses. Patel was acquitted of the charge by the jury.
