= Edward William Meyerstein =

British merchant, stockbroker and philanthropist

Sir Edward William Meyerstein (17 October 1863 – 1 February 1942) was a British merchant, stockbroker and philanthropist notable for donations to the Middlesex Hospital in Fitzrovia, London.

== Biography ==
Edward William Meyerstein was the son of William and Henrietta Meyerstein, German Jews who had emigrated around the middle of the 19th century. He was educated at University College School in Hampstead, London.

In 1886, he married Jessy Louise Solomon and they had one son, Edward Harry William Meyerstein who became a poet and independent scholar.

He gave £250,000 in the 1930s to the Middlesex Hospital in London to establish Meyerstein Institute of Radiotherapy formed in 1936. The building was opened by Sir William Bragg then president of the Royal Society.

Meyerstein lived in Sevenoaks, Kent, and was High Sheriff of Kent from 1937–38 and 1941–42. Additionally, he was knighted in 1938 for his benefactions to healthcare.

He died in London in 1942.
