= Brian Windeyer =

Sir Brian Wellingham Windeyer KBE, FRCS (7 February 1904 – 26 October 1994) was Professor of Therapeutic Radiology at the Middlesex Hospital Medical School, University of London, from 1942 to 1969, Dean of school from 1954 to 1967 and Vice-Chancellor of the University of London from 1969 to 1972.

== Early life and education ==
Windeyer was born in Turramurra near Sydney, Australia, to parents of British, and earlier Swiss origin. He was the youngest of seven children of Mabel Fuller Robinson (1864–1956), an orphan emigrant from London to Australia at the age of 18. In 1891 she married Richard Windeyer KC (1864–1957), a barrister. His grandfather was Sir William Charles Windeyer.

He attended Sydney Church of England Grammar School and then studied medicine at the University of Sydney obtaining MBBS in 1927.

== Career ==
After time at Royal Prince Alfred Hospital, Sydney, he worked at the Fondation Curie in Paris from 1929 to 1930. He obtained a Diploma in Medical Radiology and Electrology 1933 at Cambridge University. He also obtained FRCS at the University of Edinburgh. In 1931 he became radium officer at the Middlesex Hospital and officer in charge of the Meyerstein Institute of Radiotherapy formed in 1936. This was at a time when radium and x-ray treatment were carried out by different clinical teams. In World War II he was director in the emergency medical service of Mount Vernon Hospital in Northwood, Middlesex. In 1942 he became the first professor of therapeutic radiology at the Middlesex. He helped found and became President of the Faculty of Radiologists (1949–52).

== Personal life ==
He was married twice, first on 21 March 1928 to Joyce Ziele Russell (1903–1981). They had a son Michael (1933–) and daughter Joanne (1936–). He married second, in January 1948, Elspeth Anne Bowrey and had three children, Francis Bruce (1949–), Kyla (1954–), and Elspeth (1951-).

He was knighted (KBE) in 1961. The Windeyer building, now the Windeyer Institute of Medical Sciences, of University College London with which the Middlesex Medical School merged, was named after him.

== See also ==
- List of vice-chancellors of the University of London
- Radiation therapy
- History of radiation therapy

Academic offices
Preceded by Sir Owen Saunders FRS	Vice-Chancellor of the University of London; 1969–1972	Succeeded by Sir Cyril Philips
