= Shire of Toombul =

Local government area of Queensland, Australia

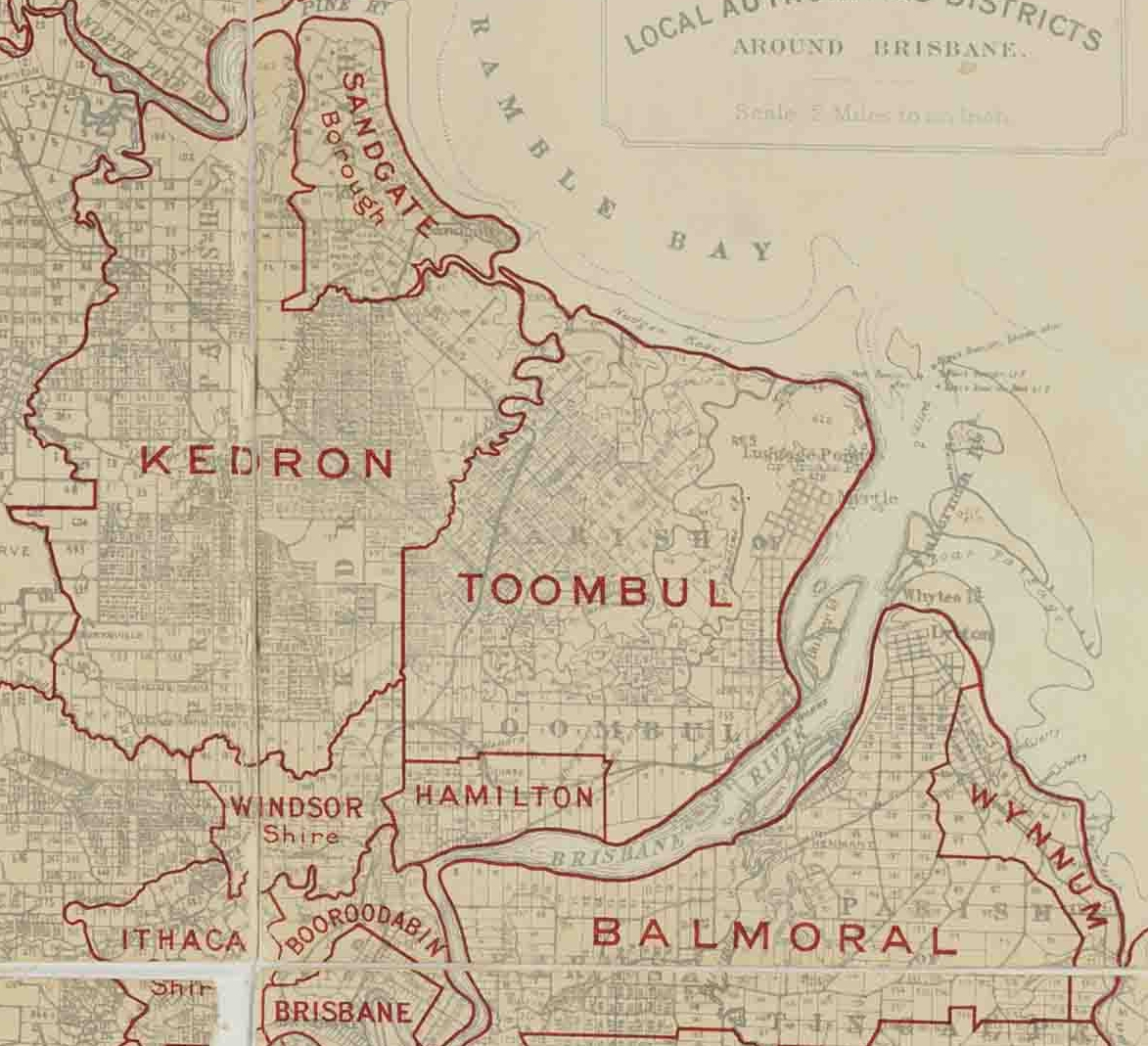
Map of Toombul Division and adjacent local government areas, March 1902

The Shire of Toombul was a local government area of Queensland, Australia, located in northern Brisbane from 1883 to 1925.

== History ==
The Nundah Division was one of the original divisions created on 11 November 1879 under the Divisional Boards Act of 1879.

The division was a large one, ranging from the Pine River in the north to the Brisbane River in the south and from Moreton Bay in the east to Chinaman's Creek (now South Pine River) in the west. The residents in the southern part of the division (the Toombul area) felt their needs were quite distinct from those further north and immediately began to agitate for the division to be split. On 1 November 1883, the Toombul Division was separated from the Nundah Division (which was later renamed the Kedron Division).

On 2 October 1890 the Hamilton Division was separated from the Toombul Division due to the agitation of Toombul board member Andrew Lang Petrie, who became the first chairman of the Hamilton board.

On 31 March 1903, the Local Authorities Act 1902 replaced Divisions with Shires and Towns, replacing Toombul Division with the Shire of Toombul.

The Shire of Toombul War Memorial was dedicated by the Governor of Queensland, Matthew Nathan, on 12 November 1921. The memorial commemorates who served in World War I. It is located in Nundah Memorial Park (then known as Buckland Park) (27.402890°S 153.058696°E).

On 1 October 1925, the Shire of Toombul was amalgamated into the City of Brisbane.

== Toombul Shire Hall ==
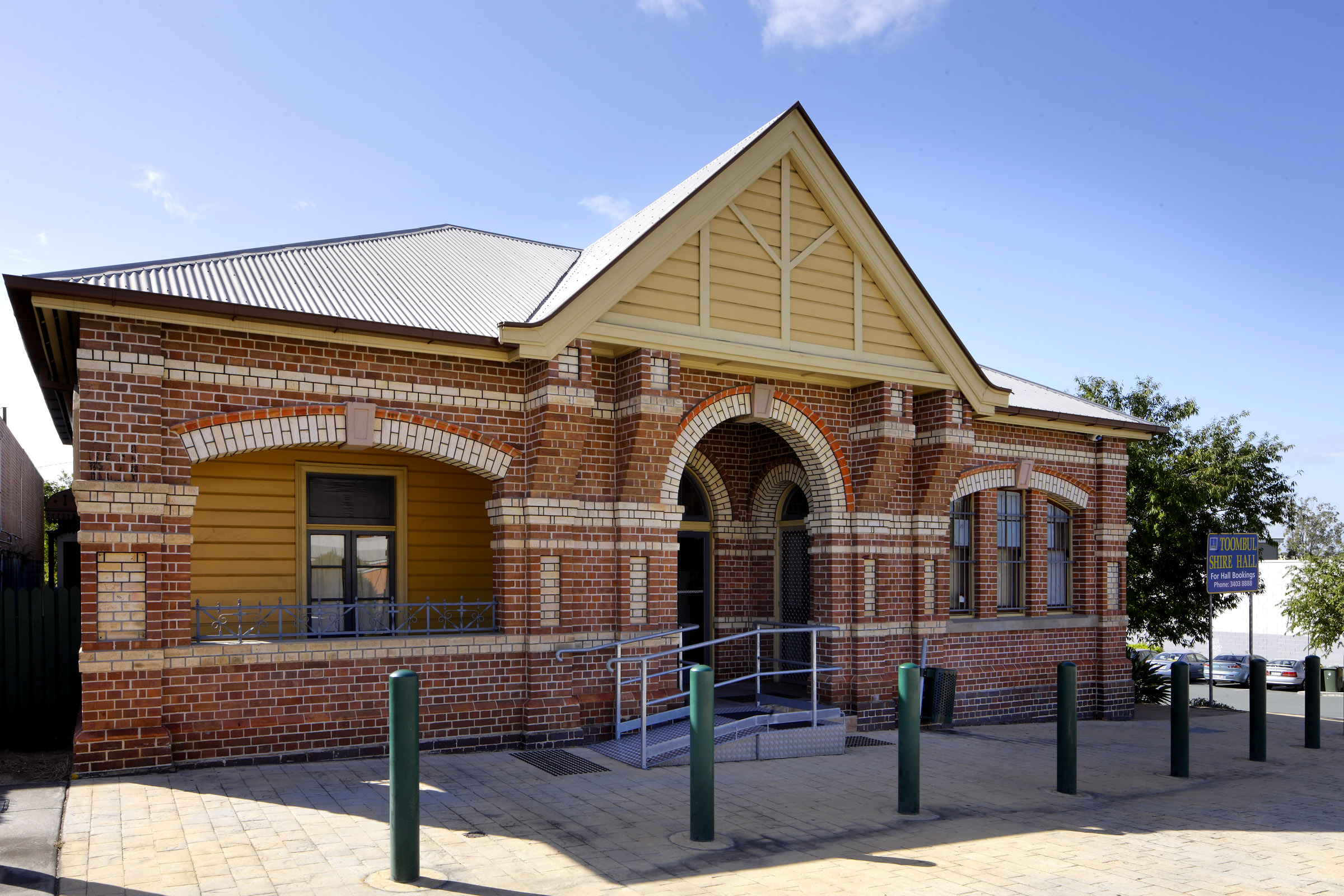
The former Toombul Shire Hall, in 2011

When the Toombul Division was established, it had offices situated at Breakfast Creek. When the Hamilton Division separated in 1890, it took over the offices at Breakfast Creek, forcing the Toombul Divisional Board to rent premises in Boyd Street, Nundah.

The division erected a hall in 1891 at 1141 Sandgate Road, Nundah. It comprised offices at the front of the building and a public hall at the rear.

The Shire Hall was retained by the Brisbane City Council after amalgamation in 1925 and was used as for public health offices and as a works depot with the hall available for community meetings.

During World War 2, the building was by the ARP Civil Defence and the Nundah Auxiliary Ambulance. The Queensland Ambulance Transport Brigade offering first aid training in the building.

Following a $135,000 renovation in 1987–88 by the Brisbane City Council, the building has been re-opened solely for community use for functions and meetings.

The hall was listed on the Queensland Heritage Register on 21 October 1992.

== Chairmen ==
The chairmen of the Shire of Toombul were:

- 1883–1885: John Francis Buckland (also MLA for Bulimba)
- 1886–1889: William Widdup
- 1890–1891: Andrew Wagner
- 1892: Isaac Stuckey
- 1893: Georges Robert
- 1894: William Widdup
- 1895: Andrew Wagner
- 1896: John Lancaster
- 1897: John Chapman
- 1898: Isaac Stuckey
- 1899: Andrew Wagner
- 1900: Samuel Unwin
- 1901–1902: John Elliott
- 1903: John Lancaster
- 1904–1905: James Francis Maxwell (later Mayor of Brisbane and MLA for Toowong)
- 1906: George Morrison
- 1907: Robert Westacott
- 1908: David Wildermuth
- 1909: William Price Cooksley
- 1910: W. B. Robinson
- 1911: David Wildermuth
- 1912: William Price Cooksley
- 1913: Oliver Collins
- 1914: David Wildermuth
- 1915: William Lionel Childs
- 1916: John Lancaster
- 1917–1918: Percy Charles Sapsford
- 1919: James Peter Peterson
- 1920–1925: Frederick William Bradbury
