= Mary Windeyer =

Australian community worker (1837–1912)

Lady Mary Elizabeth Windeyer
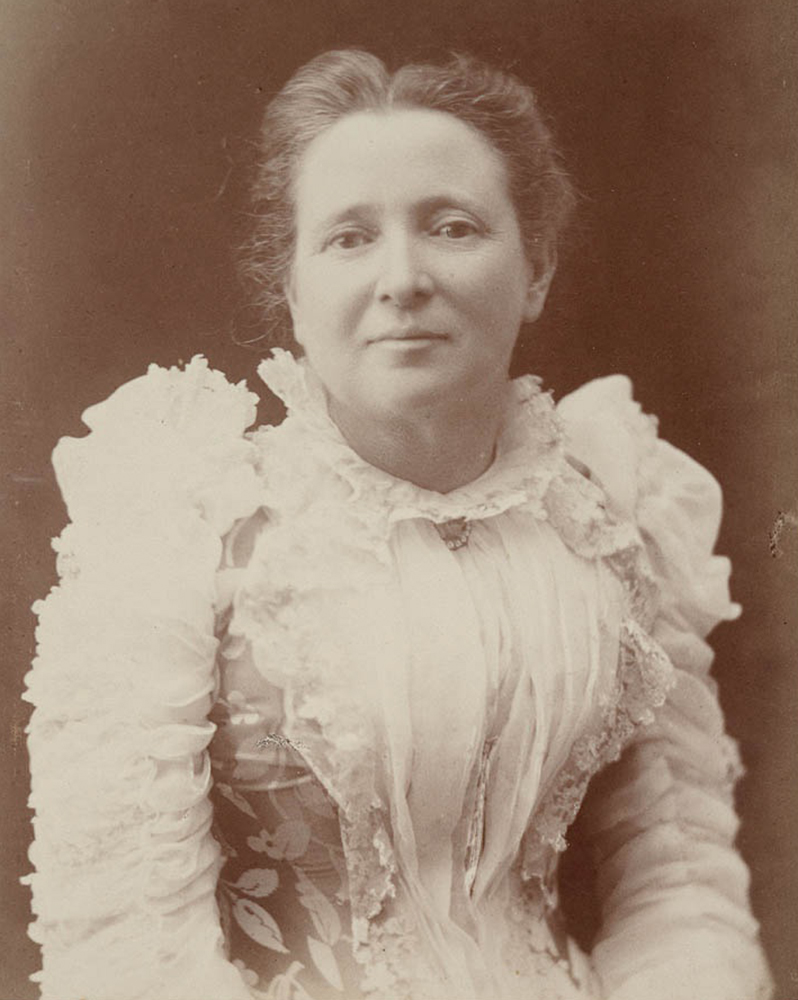
- Born: Mary Elizabeth Bolton; 28 September 1836; Hove, Sussex
- Died: 3 December 1912 (aged 76); Tomago, New South Wales
- Occupations: child welfare reformer, temperance advocate, welfare worker, women's activist
- Spouse: William Charles Windeyer
- Children: Maria (1859-1931); Mary Emily (1861-1950); Wilhelmina (1863-1864); Jane (1865-1950); Margaret (1866-1939); Richard (1868–1959); William Archibald (1871-1943); Lucy (1872-1920); Edward (1876-1942)
- Parent(s): Reverend Robert Thorley Bolton & Jane Martha Ball

Lady Mary Elizabeth Windeyer (28 September 1836 – 3 December 1912) was an Australian women's rights campaigner, particularly in relation to women's suffrage in New South Wales, a philanthropist and charity organizer.

Mary was born on 28 September 1836, at Hove in Sussex, England, one of eleven children of the Reverend Robert Thorley Bolton and Jane Martha Ball. On 8 April 1839 the Rev Bolton, his wife and six children, including Mary, left Plymouth, England on the barque Strathfieldsaye, arriving in Sydney, New South Wales on 25 July 1839, and the family moved to Hexham, New South Wales where Rev Bolton was the minister at St Stephen's church. In 1863 Rev Bolton was held to be the father of an illegitimate son.

On 31 December 1857 Mary married William Charles Windeyer, then a barrister and law reporter for the Empire. Coincidentally William's mentor, Henry Parkes, emigrated to NSW on the same vessel as Mary in 1839. William and Mary had nine children between 1859 and 1876, although one child, Wilhelmina, died in infancy, aged 1. Mary was seriously ill in 1874 and in 1876 and during that time stayed with her mother-in-law Maria Windeyer at Tomago House, Tomago, New South Wales.

In 1874 Mary was one of a group of wealthy women who established the foundling hospital at Darlinghurst, initially to reduce infanticide by providing a home for infants, then reorganised to provide care for mothers with illegitimate children. The hospital subsequently became The Infants' Home Child and Family Services.

In 1879 Mary was a founding member of the Boarding Out Society, along with Mrs Marian Jefferis, Lady Marian Allen and Mrs Mary Ischam Garran. The purpose of the society was to help find homes for children to remove them from state run orphanages. In 1881 the NSW government established the Children's Relief Board, and Mary was one of the first board members.

Mary's sister, Anne Jane Bolton, was one of the first women to sit the senior public examination in 1871, winning the Fairfax prize for the best female candidate. Mary was a member of the fundraising committee for the establishment of The Women's College. Sir William was actively involved at the University of Sydney, being the Vice Chancellor from 1883 to 1887, founding chairman of the Women's College and Chancellor from 1895 to 1896.

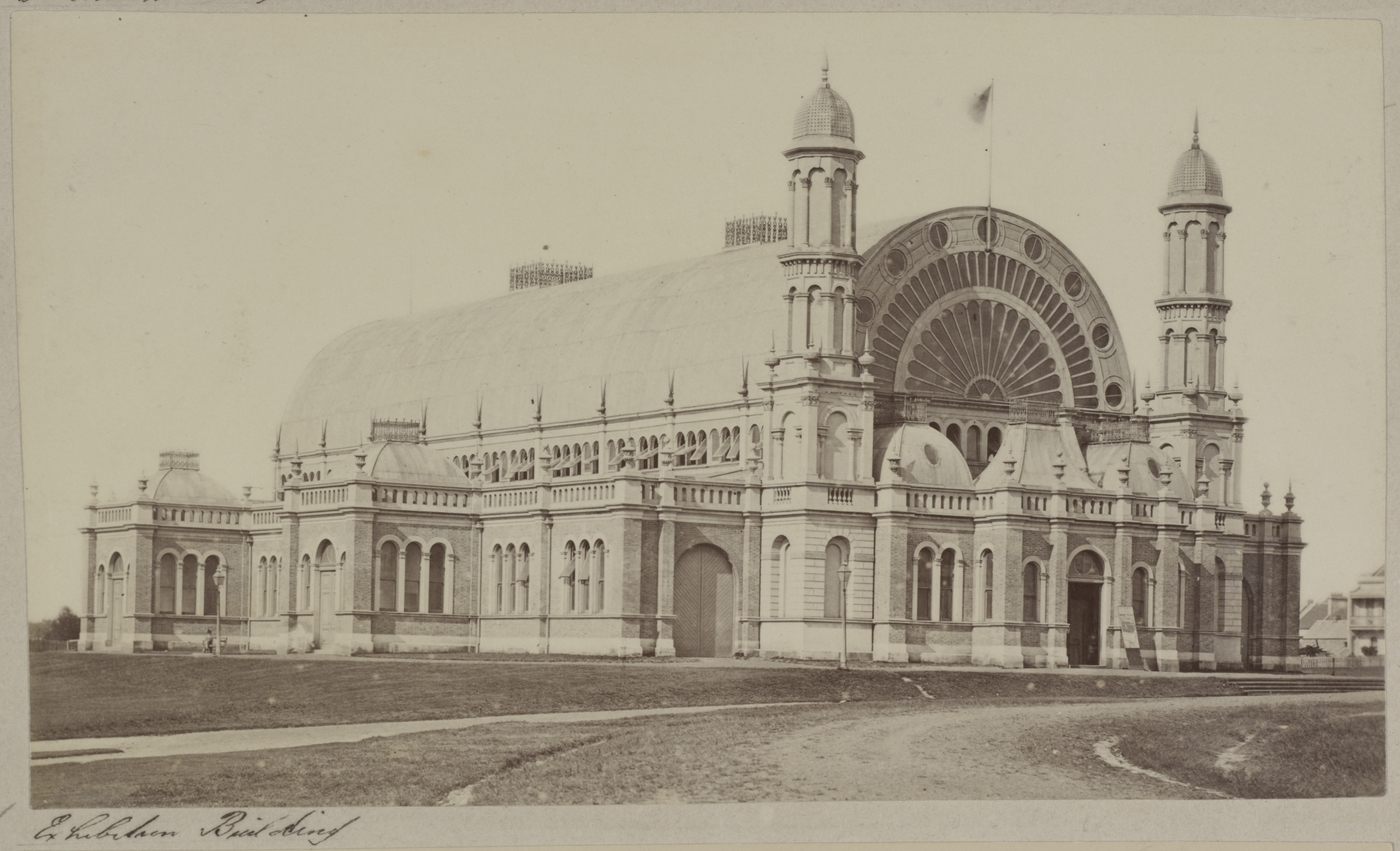
Exhibition building, Prince Alfred Park, c. 1870

In 1886 Mary and William visited England and on her return Mary helped to organize the Exhibition of Women's Industries and Centenary Fair 1888, that was part of the centenary celebrations of the arrival of the First Fleet. Mary was the delegate for the dealing with "Educational examination and competition in classic and modern languages, original compositions in prose and verse, ambulance work, sericulture, and the important work of sick nursing".

Mary was a member of the Woman's Christian Temperance Union of New South Wales. Together with Rose Scott, Mary was a founder of the NSW Women's Literary Society which developed into the Womanhood Suffrage League of New South Wales and Mary was the foundation president. She became Lady Mary when William was knighted in 1891.

Mary started campaigning for a Women's hospital in 1893, in order to help poor women and to train nurses. This was achieved in 1895 Dr James Graham founded what became the Crown Street Women's Hospital, and Mary was the first president of the hospital.

After William died in 1897, Mary moved to live at Tomago House. Mary died at Tomago on 3 December 1912 aged 76 and her estate was valued at A£11,408, the equivalent of A$1,341,088 in 2016.
