= Racecourse Road, Brisbane =

Road in Brisbane, Australia

Racecourse Road Queensland
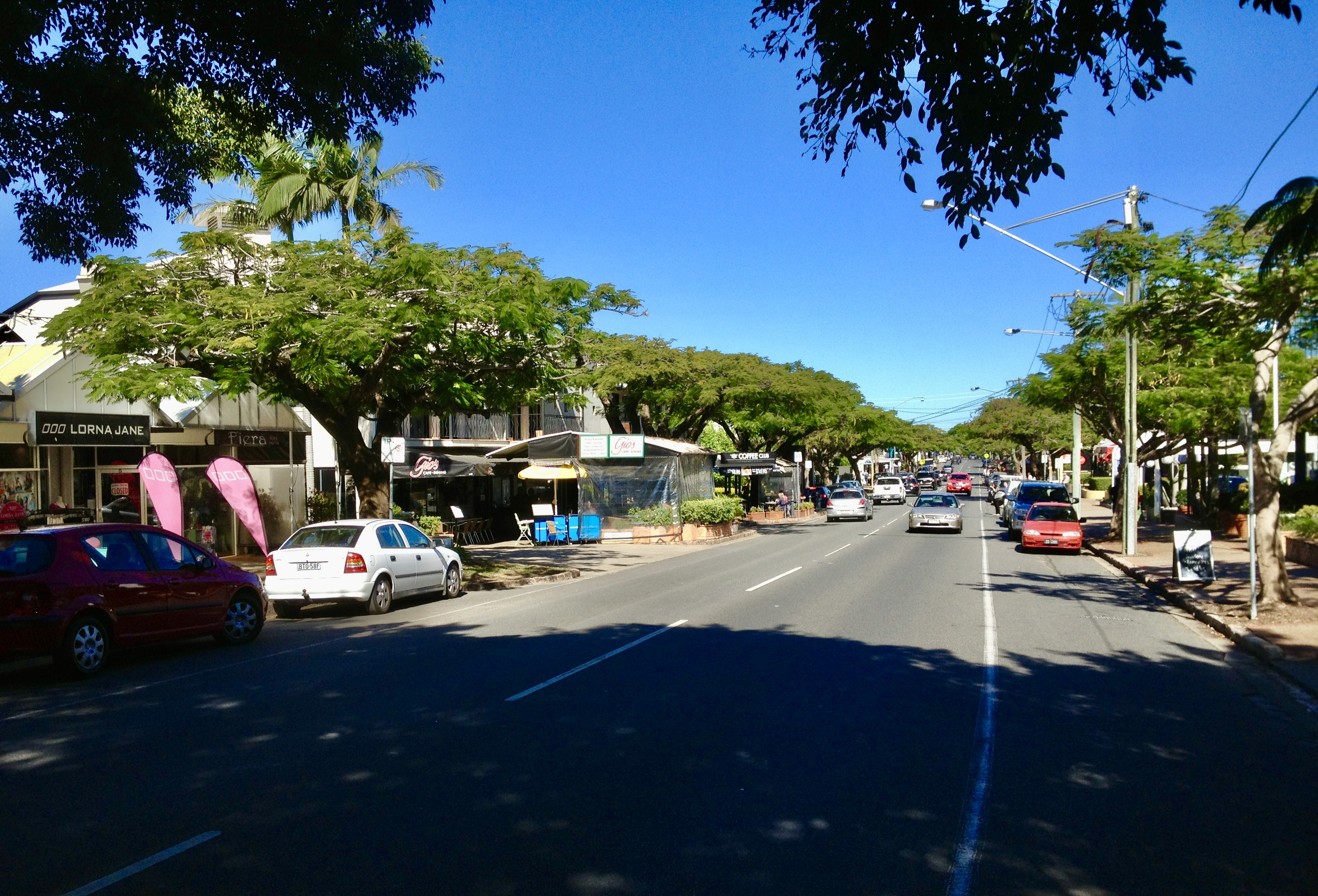
- Racecourse Road, May 2013

General information
- Type: Road
- Length: 900 m (0.6 mi)
- Maintained by: Brisbane City Council

Major junctions
- South end: Kingsford Smith Drive (State Route 25)
- North end: Eagle Farm Racecourse

Location(s)
- LGA(s): City of Brisbane
- Major suburbs: Hamilton, Ascot

Racecourse Road is a road spanning the suburbs of Hamilton and Ascot in the City of Brisbane, Queensland, Australia. It is a dining, shopping and entertainment precinct in Brisbane, that connects Kingsford Smith Drive and the Eagle Farm Racecourse.

== Geography ==
Racecourse Road extends for 900 metres (3,000 ft) from Kingsford Smith Drive in Hamilton in the south to Eagle Farm Racecourse in Ascot in the north. At its southern end, it connects to Portside Wharf and the Hamilton Harbour precinct, at its northern end to the Doomben Racecourse. The road is well known for the poinciana trees lining the footpaths along its full length.

== Transport ==
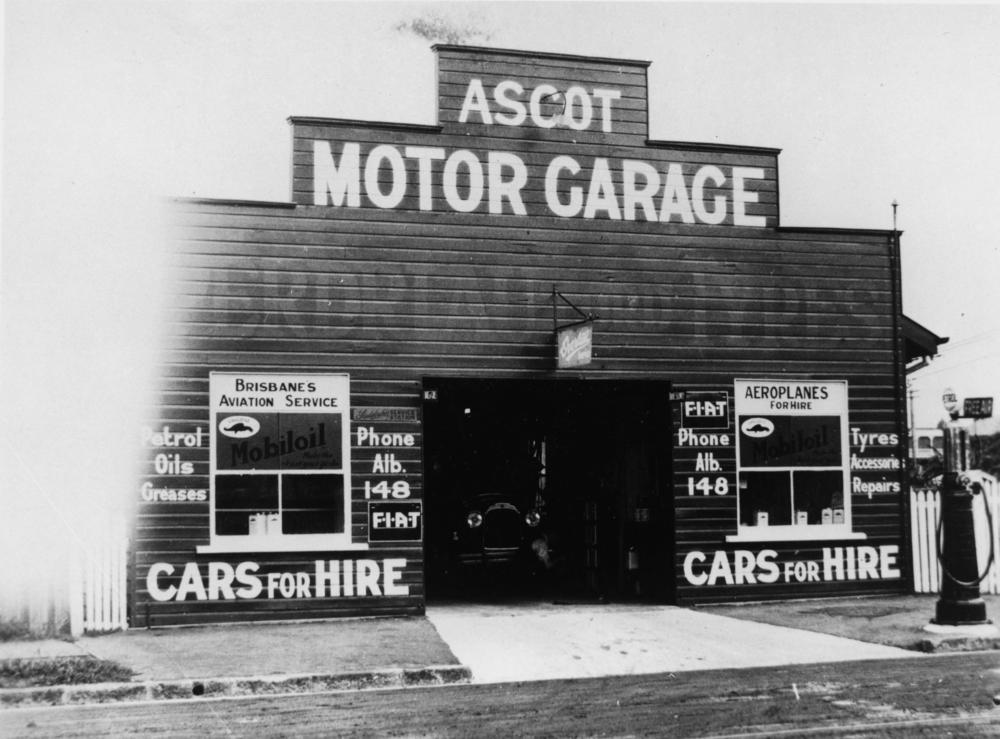
Ascot Motor Garage, Racecourse Road (1920s)

Racecourse Road was serviced by a Brisbane tram line from 1899 until 1969 when all Brisbane tram services were abandoned. It is now serviced by four stops of Brisbane bus lines 300 and 305, as well as lines 301, 302 and 303. Translink's CityCat terminal is located the road's southern end at Bretts Wharf. Access to the City network train services is provided since 1882 by the Eagle Farm railway station. The first taxi company in Brisbane, the Ascot Taxi Service, was founded by Edmund Beckham and Edward Videan in 1919 and it operated from the Ascot Garage on Racecourse Road.

== Business ==
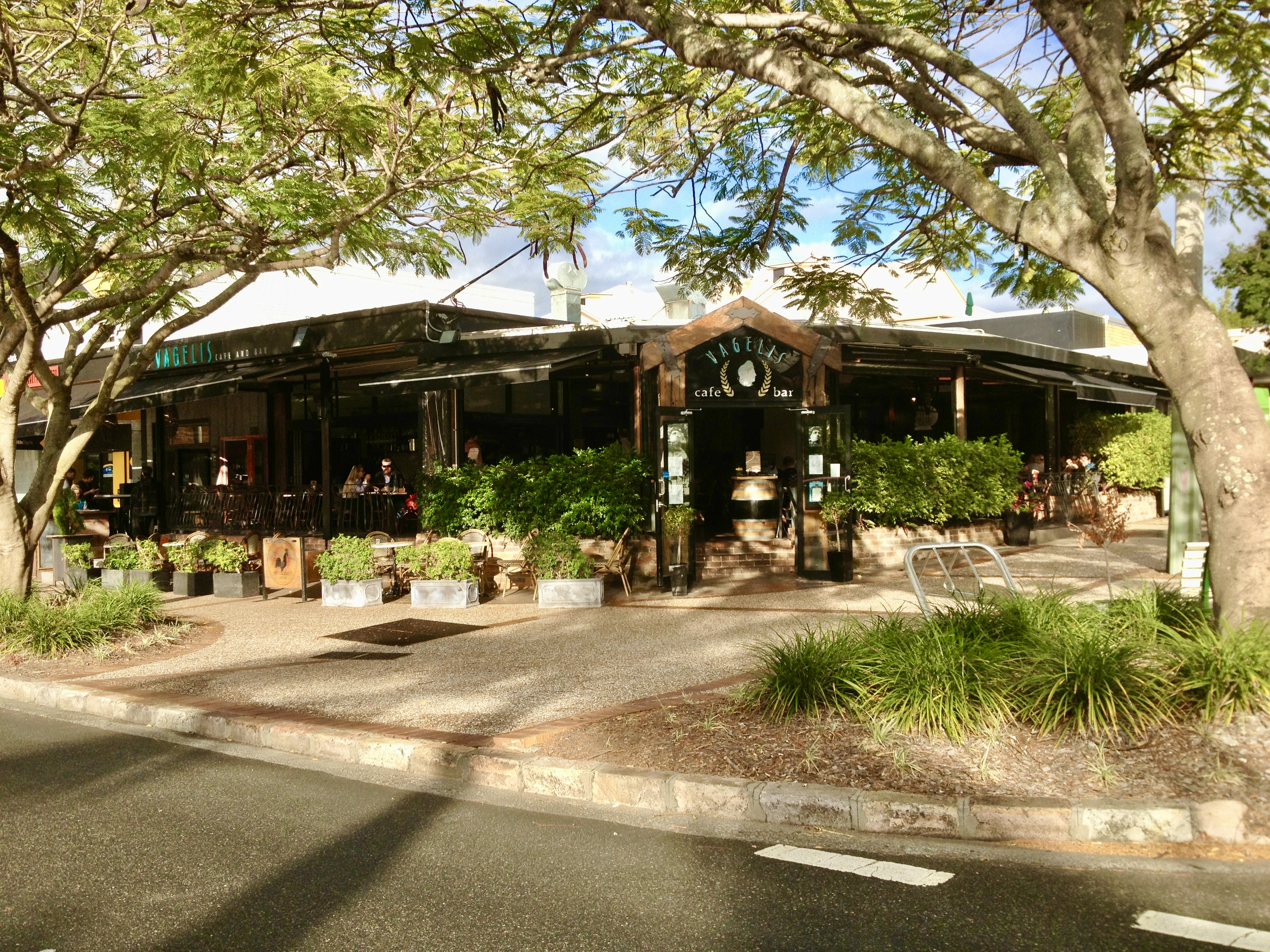
Cafe/restaurant on Racecourse Road

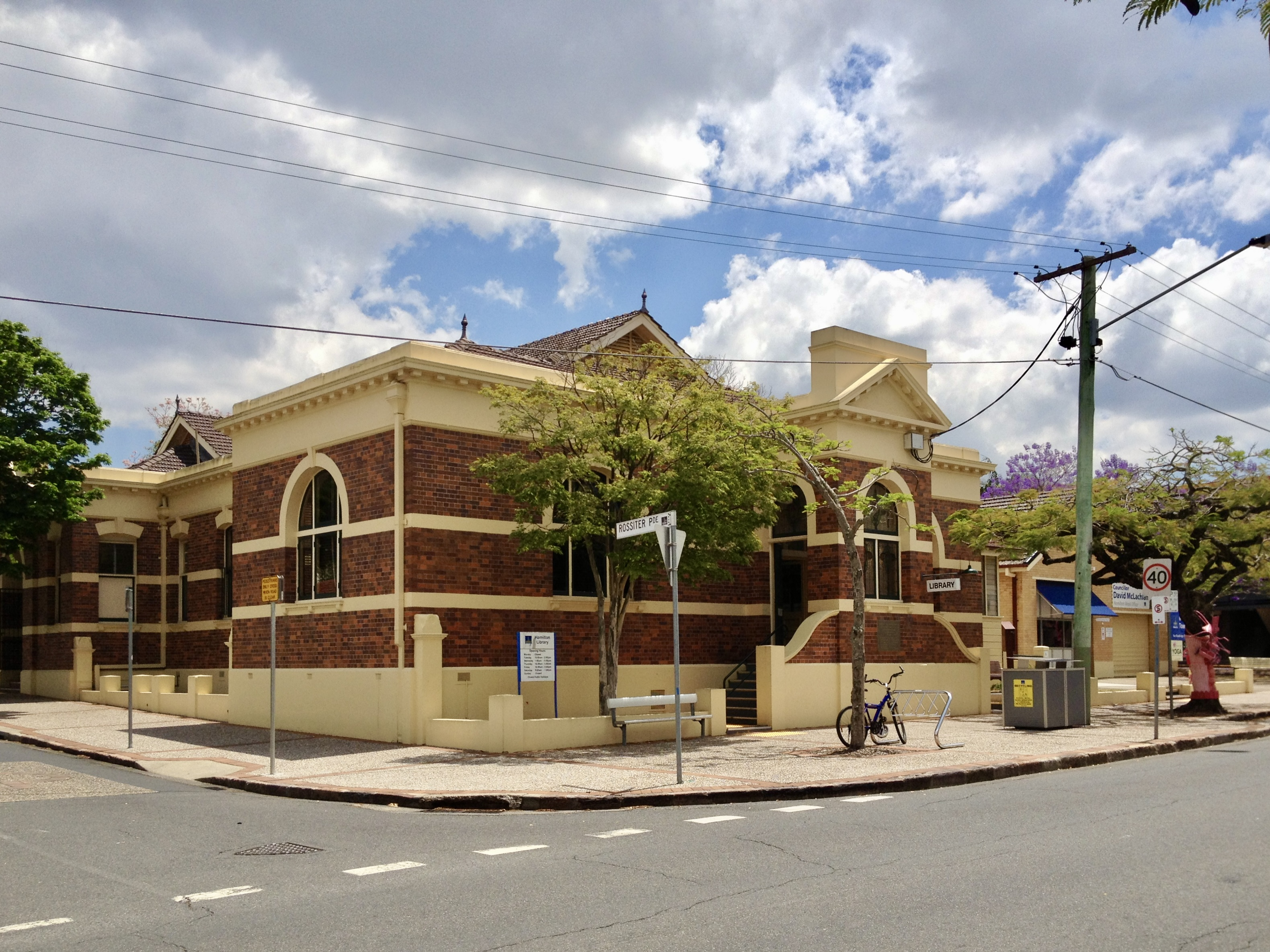
Old Hamilton Town Hall, now a city library, seen from Racecourse Road. A poincinia tree decorated by the Pink Poincinia Project can be seen at the right.

Racecourse Road is home to more than 130 businesses. These include 30 restaurants and cafes, including several Thai restaurants and many ethnic and Western cuisines, including the noted Baguette restaurant, Tatiana Grigorieva's gelateria Milany, supermarkets and a convenience store opposite the Hamilton Hotel pub. Other shops include florists and a dozen boutiques and fashion shops, 5 bank branches, a post office, several dental and medical practices, numerous real estate agents, two news agents, hairdressers, and a Brisbane City library.

Some of the most expensive houses in Brisbane are located on large blocks of land in the adjacent streets east of Racecourse Road in Hamilton and Ascot, while accommodation on Racecourse Road itself is now overwhelmingly in small blocks of apartments.

St Augustine's Anglican Church, whose car park is accessed from Racecourse Road, was built in 1919. It is a two-storey brick building with a chapel and a columbarium beneath. Different sections of the building commemorate different sections of the Australian armed forces.

The Front Row Theatre conducts its season in the old Hamilton Town Hall.

When the member for the electoral district of Clayfield, Tim Nicholls (LNP), was councillor for the Brisbane City Council, he had an office in Racecourse Road until the 2006 Queensland election when he defeated Liddy Clark (ALP) who also had her office on Racecourse Road. The current councillor for the Hamilton ward, David McLachlan, now occupies the office Nicholls used when he was councillor.

== Festivals ==
Annual events include the street carnival in June, spring and winter racing carnivals on the two racecourses, the Pink Poincinia Project for breast cancer awareness which decorates the trees with pink ornaments and figures. St Augustine's Anglican Church starts its Christmas celebrations with a community carols concert.
