= Victor Windeyer =

Australian judge and general (1900–1987)

Major General The Right Honourable Sir Victor Windeyer KBE, CB, DSO & Bar, ED, QC, PC
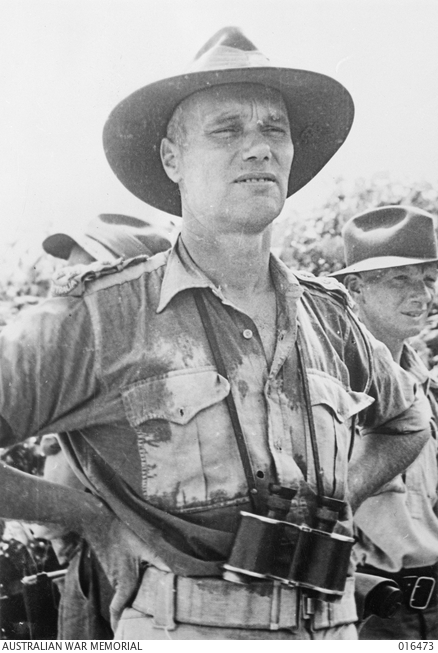
- Brigadier Victor Windeyer in New Guinea, January 1944

Justice of the High Court of Australia
- In office 8 September 1958 – 29 February 1972
- Nominated by: Sir Robert Menzies
- Preceded by: Sir Dudley Williams
- Succeeded by: Sir Ninian Stephen

Personal details
- Born: 28 July 1900 Hunters Hill, New South Wales
- Died: 23 November 1987 (aged 87) Sydney, New South Wales
- Relatives: Richard Windeyer (great-grandfather); William Charles Windeyer (grandfather); Richard Windeyer (uncle) (Note: See Windeyer family (Australia))
- Education: University of Sydney
- Military career
- Allegiance: Australia
- Branch: Australian Army
- Service years: 1918–1953
- Rank: Major General
- Service number: NX396
- Commands: 2nd Division (1950–1952); 20th Brigade (1942–1946); 2/48th Battalion (1940–1942); Sydney University Regiment (1937–1940)
- Conflicts: Second World War; North African campaign; Siege of Tobruk; South West Pacific theatre; New Guinea Campaign; Borneo Campaign
- Awards: Knight Commander of the Order of the British Empire; Companion of the Order of the Bath; Distinguished Service Order & Bar; Efficiency Decoration; Mentioned in Despatches (3)

Major General Sir William John Victor Windeyer (28 July 1900 – 23 November 1987) was an Australian judge, soldier, educator, and a Justice of the High Court of Australia.

== Early life and career ==
Windeyer was born in Sydney, into a legal family: his father, William Archibald Windeyer (1871–1943) was a Sydney solicitor, his uncle, Richard Windeyer, was a King's Counsel, his grandfather, William Charles Windeyer, was twice Attorney-General of New South Wales and Judge of the Supreme Court of New South Wales, and his great-grandfather, Sir Richard Windeyer, was a barrister and member of the first elected Parliament of New South Wales, sitting in the New South Wales Legislative Council. Windeyer studied at Sydney Grammar School and later at the University of Sydney, graduating with a Bachelor of Arts in 1922 (winning the university medal in history) and a Bachelor of Laws (LLB) in 1925.

In 1925, Windeyer was admitted to the New South Wales Bar Association. From 1929 to 1940, he lectured at the University of Sydney, teaching equity and commercial law, and until 1936, legal history. His book Essays in Legal History published in 1938 was for many years a standard textbook on the subject. In 1939, Windeyer assisted Justice Victor Maxwell at the Australian Government Royal Commission into the extension of Sydney GPO.

Windeyer married Margaret and they had four children Margaret, Bill, Jim and Frank. In 1938, he built a home called Peroomba in Warrawee which only passed out of family ownership in 2008.

== Military career ==
Windeyer's military career began in 1918, although he did not see active service during the First World War. In 1922 he was commissioned as a lieutenant in the Militia and attached to the Sydney University Scouts, being promoted to the rank of captain two years later. In 1929 he was promoted to major and in 1937, upon being promoted to lieutenant colonel, he took command of the Sydney University Regiment.

In 1940, following the outbreak of the Second World War, Windeyer volunteered for overseas service and joined the Second Australian Imperial Force (2nd AIF). Holding the rank of lieutenant colonel, he was tasked with raising and commanding the 2/48th Australian Infantry Battalion, part of the 9th Division. The 9th Division fought in the North African campaign, including the Siege of Tobruk, the New Guinea campaign and the Borneo campaign. He was later promoted to brigadier in January 1942, and commanded the 20th Infantry Brigade, during which time he was awarded the Distinguished Service Order (DSO) "in recognition of gallant and distinguished services in the Middle East".

Following the war, Windeyer relinquished command of the 20th Brigade, which he had commanded for the last four years, and was discharged from the 2nd AIF in early 1946, and returned to the Citizens Military Force, which was re-raised in 1948. In 1944 he had been created a Commander of the Order of the British Empire, From 1950 to 1952 he commanded the 2nd Division after being promoted to major general. He was appointed a Companion of the Order of the Bath in 1953 for his military services.

== Justice of the High Court and Privy Council ==
After returning to Australia, Windeyer continued to practise as a barrister. In 1949, he was appointed a King's Counsel and unsuccessfully sought preselection for the Senate representing the Liberal party.

In 1954 and 1955, Windeyer worked as counsel assisting the Royal Commission on Espionage.

He was appointed to the bench of the High Court on 8 September 1958. Later that year, he was created a Knight Commander of the Order of the British Empire (KBE). One of his first judgments on the court was when he joined in the unanimous judgement of the court in a constitutional case Browns Transport Pty Ltd v Kropp which considered whether the imposition of licensing fees under a state statute in relation to a licence for the carriage of goods amounts to the imposition of a duty of excise within the meaning of s. 90 of the Constitution, which denies to the States the power to impose such duties. One of his first separate judgements was Commonwealth v Butler.

Windeyer was elevated to the Privy Council in 1963, and joined the Privy Council's Judicial Committee in 1972.

Windeyer made a considerable contribution to the jurisprudence of the court in Victoria v Commonwealth the "Payroll Tax case" in his interpretation of the meaning of the Engineers Case. He sat on the bench of the High Court until his retirement on 29 February 1972.

== Later life and death ==
On their acquisition of the 6th, 7th, 8th & 9th Floors of Mena House at 225 Macquarie Street, Sydney Chambers by Counsel's Chambers Limited in 1983, the new chambers were named Windeyer Chambers in his honour. He opened the new chambers on 15 June 1984. Windeyer died in 1987. One of his sons, William Victor Windeyer, followed him into the legal profession and as of 2005 was a Judge of the Supreme Court of New South Wales; he also served in the military, receiving the Reserve Force Decoration. Out of respect for MAJGEN Sir Victor Windeyer, Sydney University Regiment commissioned an award in honour of him that recognises the most outstanding officer within the Regiment. The award provides an opportunity for the recipient to train with their sister Regiment, The Rifles (formerly the Royal Green Jackets).

== See also ==
- Henry George Fryberg, an associate to Windeyer at the High Court of Australia
