= Margaret Windeyer =

Australian librarian and feminist (1866–1939)

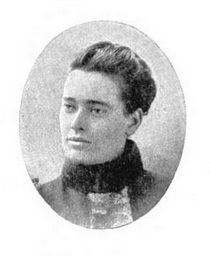
- Born: 24 November 1866; Sydney, Australia
- Died: 11 August 1939 (aged 72); Darlinghurst, Australia
- Occupation: Librarian

Margaret Windeyer (24 November 1866 – 11 August 1939) was an Australian librarian and feminist.

== Life and career ==
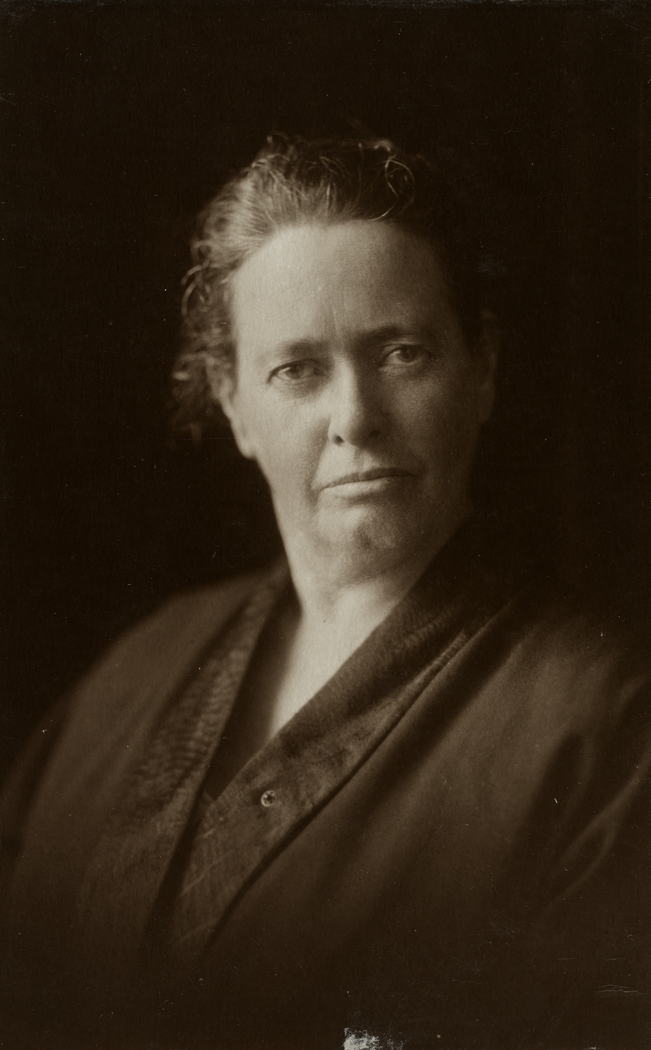
Margaret Windeyer

Windeyer was born in Sydney in 1866, the fifth daughter and one of nine children of judge and politician William Charles Windeyer and suffragist Mary Elizabeth Windeyer.

Windeyer was a member of the Women's Literary Society, which met in her family home, and its successor organisation, the Womanhood Suffrage League of New South Wales, of which her mother Mary was the founding president when it was established in 1891. After visiting the United States in 1893 as a commissioner to the World's Columbian Exposition in Chicago, where she represented the league at the World's Congress of Representative Women, she returned to Australia to help establish the National Council of Women of Australia.

In 1899, Windeyer travelled to New York City to complete a two-year course at the New York State Library's librarian school. Although her previous employment applications for librarian work in Sydney had been rejected because she was a woman and deemed too young, after gaining experience in New York and becoming familiar with the Dewey Decimal Classification she was hired by the Public Library of New South Wales as a cataloguer upon her return in 1901; she was one of the first women to work at the library. Throughout her career, she was also involved in starting children's libraries in Sydney and children's reading rooms in regular public libraries.

From 1907 to 1939, Windeyer was a council member of The Women's College at the University of Sydney. She was also involved in the Professional Women Workers' Association, the Kindergarten Union of New South Wales, the Parks and Playgrounds Movement, and the National Council of Women of Australia, which appointed her honorary life president in 1918 although she had never been a member of the council's executive board.

Windeyer died on 11 August 1939 in Darlinghurst, an inner-Sydney suburb, following a brief illness.
