= John Edgar (minister) =

Irish minister and professor (1798–1866)

- Born: 13 June 1798; Ballynahinch, County Down
- Died: 26 August 1866 (aged 68); Rathgar, Dublin
- Education: Royal Belfast Academical Institution; University of Glasgow
- Occupation: Presbyterian minister
- Spouse: Susanna Edgar
- Religion: Presbyterian

John Edgar (13 June 1798 – 26 August 1866) was a minister, professor of theology, moderator of the Secession Synod in 1828 and moderator of the Presbyterian Church of Ireland in 1842. He was Honorary Secretary to the Presbyterian Home Mission during the Famine in 1847.

== Life ==
He was born near Ballynahinch on 13 June 1798, the eldest son of Samuel Edgar (1766-1826) and Elizabeth McKee (1771-1839). He attended the Royal Belfast Academical Institution where he excelled as a student, and was ordained a minister in the Presbyterian church in 1820. He became D.D. of Hamilton College, USA in 1836, was elected moderator of the Presbyterian Church of Ireland for 1842–3, and obtained LL.D. of New York in 1860.

Edgar died aged 68 on 26 August 1866, in Cremore, Rathgar, Dublin, where he had gone to get medical treatment. He was survived by his wife Susanna, and was buried in Balmoral Cemetery, Belfast.

== Temperance Movement ==
Edgar is known as the origin of the Temperance Movement in Ireland because he poured alcohol out his window in 1829. On 14 August 1829 he wrote a letter in the Belfast Telegraph advocating temperance.

He formed the Ulster Temperance Movement. In 1834, Edgar told a parliamentary committee inquiring into the causes and consequences of drunkenness in the United Kingdom that there were 550 "dram shops" in Belfast and 1,700 shops selling intoxicants in Dublin as well as numerous illicit distillers "even in the most civilised districts of Ulster".

He was also the founder of the Ulster Female Penitentiary in 1839 which was a residential home for prostitutes; and was instrumental in getting the Deaf, Dumb and Blind Institute set up in Belfast.

The meeting which led to the establishment of the Presbyterian Orphan Society was held in 1866 in his drawing room.

== Home mission and famine relief in Connaught ==
Edgar was also involved in the relief effort by the presbyterian church in Connaught during the Irish famine. The church was accused of proselytizing during the famine period. In the May Street Presbyterian Church he said, "I hope soon to have an opportunity of directing public attention to spiritual famine in Connaught, but our effort now is to save the perishing body ... Our brother is starving, and, till we have satisfied his hunger, we have no time to inquire whether he is Protestant or Romanist".

Edgar was interested in Gaelic language and culture, and was critical of other Protestant faiths particularly the Church of Ireland (Anglican) for not preaching in the Irish language.

Academic offices
Preceded by Samuel Edgar	Professor of Theology of the Secession Synod; 1826-1840	Succeeded by Himself and Samuel Hanna as joint Professors of Theology of the Presbyterian Church in Ireland
Preceded by Himself as Professor of Theology of the Secession Synod; Samuel Hanna as Professor of Theology of the Synod of Ulster	Professor of Theology of the Presbyterian Church in Ireland; 1840-1866; With: Samuel Hanna, 1840-1852	Succeeded by Robert Watts
Presbyterian Church titles
Preceded by Henry Cooke (1841)	Moderator of the Presbyterian Church in Ireland; 1842	Succeeded by Robert Stewart (1843)
