= Henry Cooke (minister) =

Irish Presbyterian minister

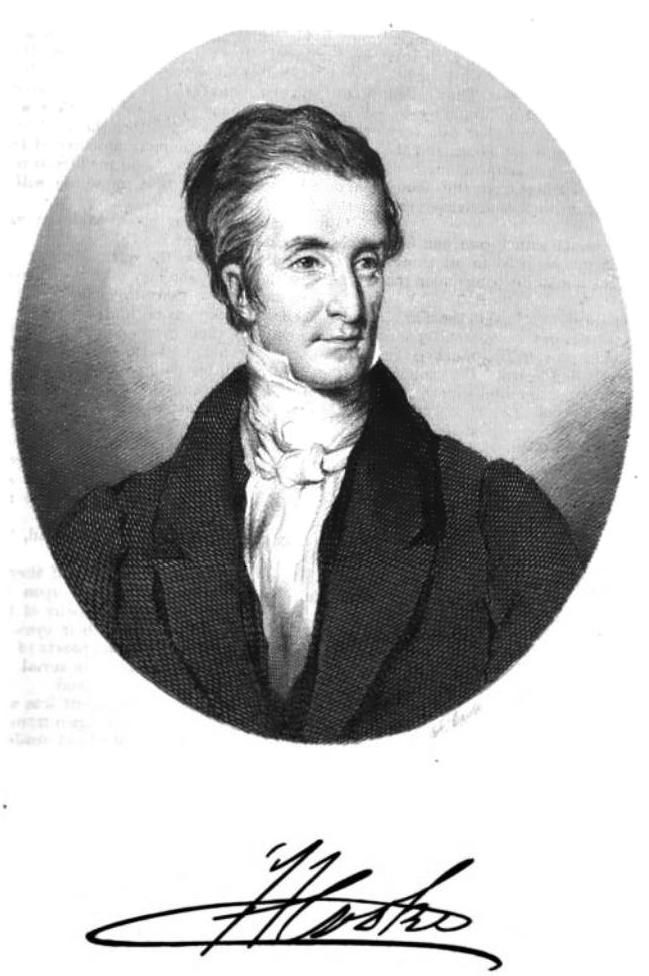
Henry Cooke

Henry Cooke (1788–1868) was an Irish Presbyterian minister, an opponent of secularisation, and, in response to Catholic mobilisation under Daniel O'Connell, an advocate of "Protestant unity".

== Upbringing ==
Henry Cooke came from a family of Puritan settlers in County Down from Devonshire. His family was described as "narrow minded Calvinistic conservatives, well noted for their anti-Catholic prejudices." He was the youngest son of John Cooke, tenant farmer of Grillagh, near Maghera, County Londonderry, by his second wife, Jane Howie or Howe, of Scottish descent, and was born on 11 May 1788. From his mother, he derived his force of character, his remarkable memory, and his powers of sarcasm. A vivid impression, retained through life, of the events of 1798—the Irish Rebellion—influenced his political principles. After struggling for an education in rude country schools, he matriculated at Glasgow College in November 1802. Owing to illness he did not graduate, but he completed the arts and divinity courses, not shining as a student, but taking immense pains to qualify himself as a public speaker. Fresh from Glasgow, he appeared before the Ballymena presbytery in the somewhat unclerical attire of blue coat, drab vest, white cord breeches and tops, proved his orthodoxy on trial, and was licensed to preach.

== Early career ==
Cooke's first settlement was at Duneane, near Randalstown, County Antrim, where he was ordained on 10 November 1808, though only twenty years of age, as assistant to Robert Scott, with a salary of £25 Irish. Here his evangelical fervour met with no sympathy. On 13 November 1810, he resigned from the post, and became tutor in the family of Alexander Brown of Kells, near Ballymena. He speedily received a call from Donegore, County Antrim, and was installed there at Temple-Patrick presbytery, on 22 January 1811. This congregation, vacant since 1808, had chafed under an Arian ministry and had shown its determination to return to the old paths by rejecting the candidature of Henry Montgomery. Cooke began at Donegore a systematic course of theological study; and by leave of his presbytery he returned, soon after his marriage, to Glasgow, where he spent the winter sessions 1815-16 and 1816–17, adding chemistry, geology, anatomy, and medicine to his metaphysical studies, and taking lessons in elocution from John M. Vandenhoff. He had been in the habit of giving medical aid to his flock. In 1817-18 he attended classes at Trinity College and the College of Surgeons, Dublin, and walked the hospitals. He was a hard student, but with his studies, he combined missionary labours, which resulted in the formation of a congregation at Carlow.

Shortly after his return from Dublin, Cooke was called to Killyleagh, county Down, and resigning Donegore on 6 July 1818, he was installed at Killyleagh, at Dromore presbytery on 8 September. The lord of the manor, and the leading Presbyterian at Killyleagh, was Archibald Hamilton Rowan. Rowan's younger son, Captain Rowan, an elder of Killyleagh, was attached to the older theology, and secured the election of Cooke, who was allowed to be 'by no means bigoted in his opinions'. While at Donegore he had been 'led to join in Arian ordinations', a laxity which at a later period he sincerely lamented.

In 1821, English Unitarians sent John Smethurst of Moreton Hampstead, Devon, on a preaching mission in Ulster. Favoured by Rowan (the father) he came to Killyleagh, where Cooke and the younger Rowan confronted him at his lecture in a schoolroom. Wherever Smethurst went Cooke was at hand with a reply, inflicting upon the Unitarian mission a series of defeats from which it never recovered. In opposing, later in the same year, the election of the Arian William Bruce to the chair of Hebrew and classics in the Royal Belfast Academical Institution, Cooke was unsuccessful, and he was discouraged by the result of his appeal on the subject to the following synod (at Newry, 1822). He preached in the spring of 1824 as a candidate for First Armagh, but was not chosen.

== Division in synod ==
Cooke gave evidence before the Royal Commission on education in Ireland in January 1824; and before committees of both houses of parliament in April on the religious bearings of the Irish education question. He described the Belfast Academical Institution as "a seminary of Arianism". He claimed that among the Protestants of the north of Ireland, there was increased opposition to Catholic emancipation; he warned against undue concessions to Catholics. The publication of his evidence produced a furore, and he reacted by rallying Protestant sentiment in Ulster to his call.

Cooke was then elected moderator of the General Synod of Ulster at Moneymore in June 1824. This choice began a period of divisive moves. The resolution of the synod (June 1825) in his favour, though cautiously worded, was a straw in the wind. At the outset, Cooke fought against the odds, if with allies in Robert Stewart of Broughshane, and most of the laity was with him. Among the orthodox ministers an important moderate section, led by James Carlile, looked without favour upon Cooke's policy. The leader of the Arian opposition to Cooke in the synod was Henry Montgomery.

The proceedings of the next synod (at Ballymoney, 1826) were not favourable to Cooke, who did not see his way to support a motion for subscription to the Westminster Confession; his proposal that an abridgement of its doctrines should be drawn up as a standard of orthodoxy was turned down. Then in the three succeeding synods, at Strabane (1827), Cookstown (1828), and Lurgan (1829), Cooke carried all before him. By exacting from all members of synod a declaration of belief in the Trinity, and appointing a select committee for the examination of all candidates for the ministry, he cornered the Arians.

== Split and aftermath ==
The infighting continued in a complex fashion in 1829 and 1830, around the Academical Institution. There Cooke criticised the appointment of John Ferrie as successor to John Young in the ethics chair. It meant that Cooke had failed to see his own candidate, Carlile, elected; but the rejection of Carlile as candidate for the moral philosophy chair also alienated the moderate party from the Arians. William Cairns of the Institution, himself orthodox, had been close to Young, and a critic of Cooke's line on the Institution. Montgomery picked up on inconsistency in Cooke's view of Ferrie's religious tenets; Cooke dramatised the issue as one of perjury on oath. He lashed out oratorically, and, as reported by William Dool Killen, dominated popular feeling on the personal level, as well as the synod debate. After presenting a "remonstrance", the Arians seceded. The split meant that 17 ministers with their congregations left the synod, in 1830, led by Montgomery and Fletcher Blakely. Cairns worked to get round a boycott set up by Cooke of Ferrie's teaching, but the effect was to undermine Ferrie.

Cooke's de facto expulsion of the Arian leaders was followed up by the enactment of unqualified subscription to the Westminster Confession (9 August 1836), extended to elders 8 April 1840. A union of the General Synod of Ulster with the Secession Synod, under the name General Assembly of the Presbyterian Church in Ireland, occurred on 10 July 1840; the Munster presbytery, formerly nonsubscribing, was incorporated with the assembly in 1854. Cooke was then a strong opponent of the Dissenters' Chapels Act (1844), which secured them in the possession of congregational properties.

== Belfast ministry and Irish Presbyterianism ==
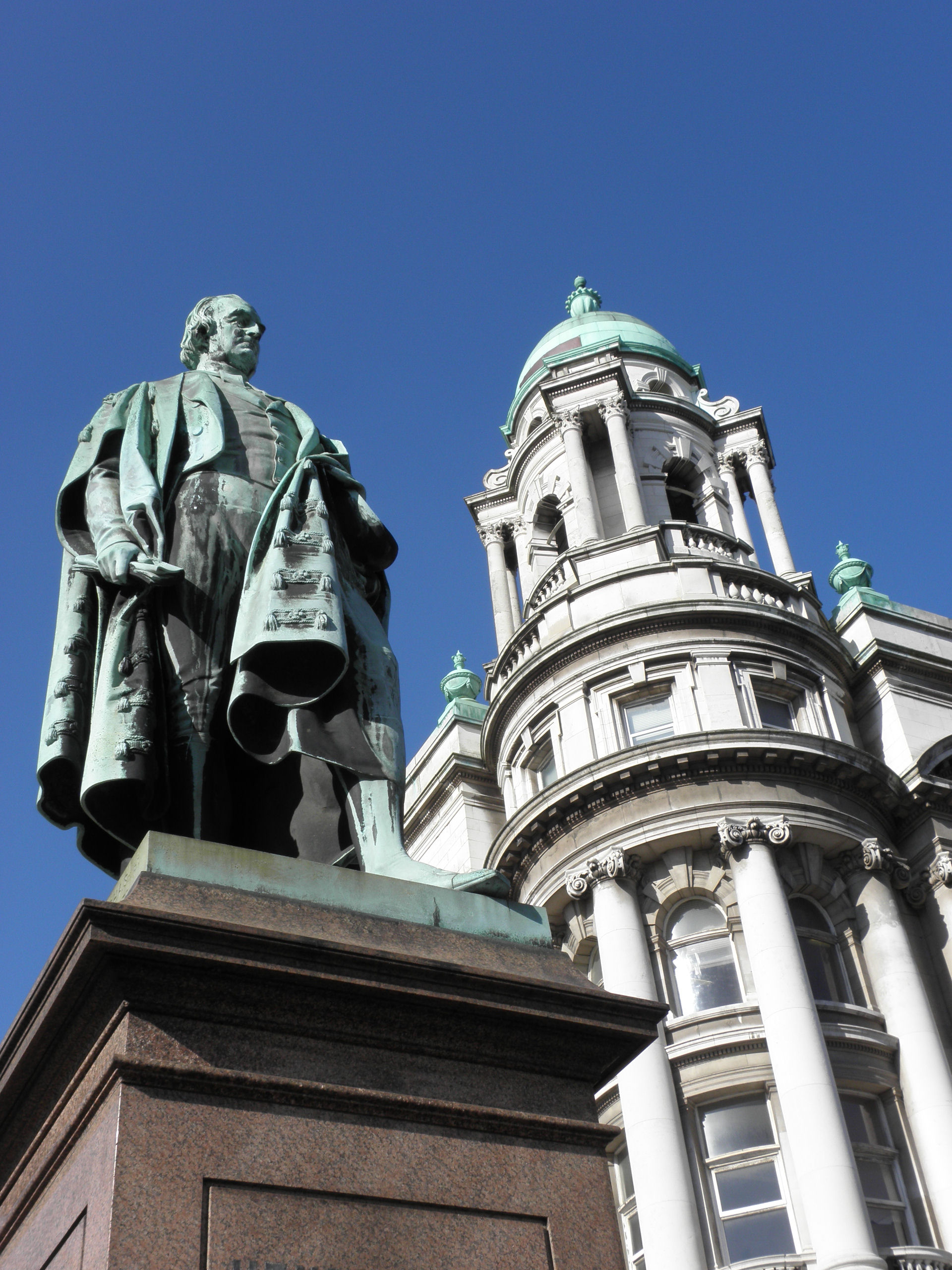
Cooke's statue in Belfast

On 12 October 1828 a unanimous call had been forwarded to Cooke from the congregation of Mary's Abbey, Dublin. But his place was in Belfast, and to there he moved, to a church specially built for him in May Street, and opened 18 October 1829. From this time to the close of his active pastorate in 1867 his fame as a preacher drew crowds to May Street. The calls upon his pulpit services elsewhere were not infrequent; hence the story, told by Classon Porter, that 'his people once memorialled their presbytery for an occasional hearing of their own minister'. Established in Belfast, he became not merely the presiding spirit of Irish Presbyterianism (he was elected moderator of assembly in 1841 and 1862), but the leader and framer of a Protestant party in the politics of Ulster. To this consummation his wishes tended, when he purged the synod. The political principles of the Arian chiefs were as dangerous in his estimation as their lax theological notions. Till the election of 1832 Belfast had been a stronghold of liberalism. Cooke turned the tide. So completely did his work transform the relations of parties that even Montgomery, in later life, dropped his political liberalism.

At the Hillsborough meeting (30 October 1834) Cooke, in the presence of forty thousand people, published the banns of a marriage between the established and Presbyterian churches of Ireland. The alliance was to be politico-religious, not ecclesiastical, a union for conserving the interests of Protestantism against the political combination of the Roman catholic, 'the Socinian, and the infidel'. Still more thoroughly did he succeed in his political mission by his dealing with O'Connell's visit to Belfast in January 1841. Cooke's challenge to a public discussion of facts and principles was evaded by O'Connell. The anti-repeal meeting which followed O'Connell's abortive demonstration was famed in Ulster.

Almost his last platform appearance was at Hillsborough on 30 October 1867, when, in his eightieth year, Cooke spoke against the threatened disestablishment of Protestantism in Ireland. On 5 March 1868 he attended the inaugural meeting of an Ulster Protestant defence association. In the same sense was the address (24 October 1868) to the Protestant electors of Ireland, penned almost on his deathbed.

Cooke's Presbyterianism was of the most robust type; he would not rank himself as a 'dissenter', claiming to be a minister of 'a branch of the church of Scotland'. But he was anxious to support the establishment of Protestant Christianity as 'the law of the empire'. When, in 1843, the general assembly of his church passed a resolution recommending its members to secure the return of Presbyterian representatives to parliament, Cooke formally withdrew from the assembly, and did not return to it until 1847, when the resolution was rescinded. In the non-intrusion controversy which divided the church of Scotland Cooke used all his influence with the government to obtain concessions satisfactory to the liberties of the church, and on the day of the disruption (18 May 1843) gave the encouragement of his presence and voice to the founders of the Free church.

== Irish national education ==
The question of education, especially in its religious bearings, engaged Cooke at an early period. When the scheme for Irish national education was started in October 1831, Cooke at once scented danger to the Protestant interest. After many negotiations the synod in 1834 broke off relations with the education board. Cooke explained the views of the synod to the parliamentary committees of inquiry in 1837. In 1839 the synod, under Cooke's guidance, organised an education scheme of its own, and applied to the government for pecuniary aid. The result was that the synod's schools were recognised by the board in 1840 on Cooke's own terms. In September 1844 the general assembly made application to the government for the erection of a college which should provide a full course of education for students for the ministry under the assembly's superintendence and control. The government, however, established the Queen's College on 30 December 1846, but endowed four chairs in a theological college at Belfast under the assembly (and two chairs in connection with the non-subscribing Presbyterians).

It was expected that Cooke would be the first president of the Queen's College; this office was conferred instead on the Rev. Pooley Shuldman Henry; to Cooke was given the agency for the distribution of Regium Donum, a post worth £320 per annum, and on the opening of the Queen's College in 1849 he was appointed Presbyterian dean of residence. Cooke, who from 1835 had been lecturer on ethics to the students of his church, was offered by the assembly (14 September 1847) his choice of the newly endowed chairs of ethics and sacred rhetoric; he chose the latter, and was shortly afterwards made president of the faculty. The assembly's college buildings were opened in 1853.

On becoming professor Cooke was compelled by the law of the assembly to resign the pastoral office; but at the urgent desire of his congregation he continued to discharge all its duties, being appointed by his presbytery 'constant supplier' until the election of a successor, John S. M'Intosh, who was installed 4 March 1868. His resignation of congregational emolument was absolute; for twenty years he served his congregation gratuitously.

In 1829 Cooke received the degree of D.D. from Jefferson College (now Washington & Jefferson College), U.S., and in 1837 that of LL.D. from Trinity College, Dublin. On various occasions, especially in 1841 and 1865, public presentations were made to him in recognition of his labours. The sums continually raised by his preaching on special occasions were remarkable tributes to the persuasion of his eloquence. He had a noble presence and thrilling voice; he was a master of the art of stating a case, had an unexpected reply to every argument of an opponent, seldom failed to make an adversary ridiculous, and when he rose to vehemence the strokes of his genius were overwhelming. In the reports of his speeches there is nothing so fine as his elegy on Castlereagh (in the debate on voluntaryism with Dr. Ritchie of Edinburgh, March 1836), a passage imperfectly reported, because it is said the pressmen 'dropped their pencils and sat with eyes riveted on the speaker'.

== Character of Cooke ==
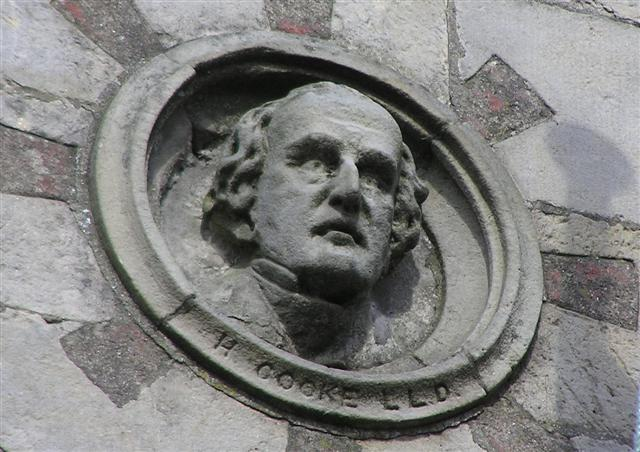
Relief bust of Cooke, on the Omagh Orange Hall

Cooke's habits of work would have been impossible without the aid of an iron constitution: he rose at four, needed little sleep, and traveled, spoke, and wrote with incessant energy. In public a dangerous and unsparing (some said an unscrupulous) foe, his private disposition was that of warm-hearted kindness. Relations of personal friendliness between him and his old antagonist, Montgomery, sprang up in their later years. Stern Protestant as he was, none was more prompt to render assistance to a Roman Catholic neighbour in time of need. A strict disciplinarian, he leaned always to the side of mercy when the courts of his church had to deal with delinquents.

Cooke's biographer, who was his son-in-law Josias Leslie Porter, quotes from Lord Cairns the saying that for half a century his life "was a large portion of the religious and public history of Ireland". Orangemen carry his likeness on their banners (though he was not an orangeman), and his statue in Belfast (erected in September 1875) is still a symbol of the Protestantism of Northern Ireland.

== Marriage and death ==
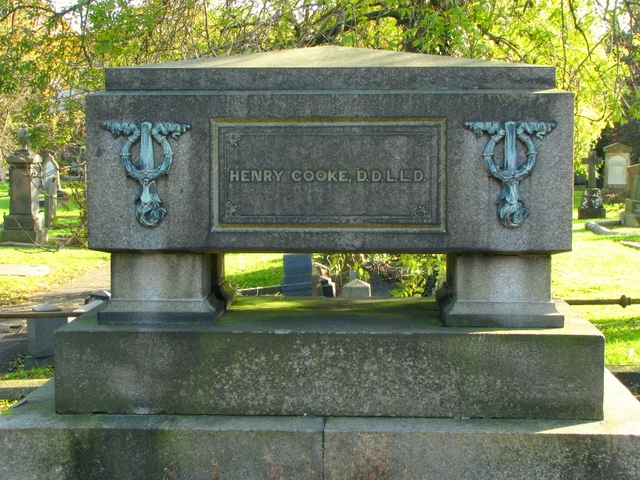
Cooke's grave in Balmoral Cemetery

Cooke died at his residence in Ormeau Road, Belfast, on Sunday, 13 December 1868. A public funeral was voted to him on the motion of Robert Knox, Bishop of Down, Connor and Dromore. He was buried in the Balmoral Cemetery on 18 December. In 1813 he married Ellen Mann of Toome, who died on 30 June 1868; by her he had thirteen children.

== Publications ==
Cooke's first publication was a charity sermon preached at Belfast 18 December 1814, which went through three editions in 1815; of this discourse Reid says 'it is remarkable for the absence of evangelical sentiment'. Remarkable also is Cooke's collection of hymns under the title, Translations and Paraphrases in Verse ... for the use of the Presbyterian Church, Killileagh, (1821), with a closely reasoned preface, in which he condemns restriction to the psalms of David in Christian worship; in later life he had the strongest antipathy to the public use of any hymnal but the metrical psalms. In 1839 he undertook a new edition of Brown's Self-interpreting Bible, (1855). The manuscript of an analytical concordance, begun in 1834 and finished in 1841, which he had taken to London for publication, perished in a fire at his hotel. Sermons, pamphlets, and magazine articles in great abundance flowed from his pen.

Presbyterian Church titles
Preceded by Samuel Hanna (1840)	Moderator of the Presbyterian Church in Ireland; 1841	Succeeded by John Edgar (1842)
Preceded by John Macnaughton (1861)	Moderator of the Presbyterian Church in Ireland; 1862	Succeeded by John Rogers (1863)
Academic offices
New title	Professor of Sacred Rhetoric and Catechetics of the Presbyterian Church in Ireland; 1847-68	Succeeded by John Rogers
New title	President of the Presbyterian Theological Faculty of Ireland (from 1853 Assembly's College, Belfast); 1847-68	Succeeded by William Dool Killen
