= Samuel Hanna =

Irish presbyterian divine

Samuel Hanna (1771–1852), was an Irish presbyterian minister, professor of theology and the first moderator of the Presbyterian Church in Ireland. He was the leader of an evangelical revival in Ulster.

== Early life and education ==
Samuel Hanna was born in 1771 in Kellswater, near Ballymena, Co. Antrim.

He was educated at the University of Glasgow, graduating M.A. in 1789.

== Parish minister ==
Hanna was ordained as minister of the presbyterian congregation of Drumbo, Co. Down, on 4 August 1795. His reputation as a preacher grew rapidly. On 11 December 1799 he was installed as minister of Rosemary Street, Belfast. He revived the congregation, and his meeting-house was rebuilt twice (completed in 1831). A warm advocate of Sunday schools and of bible distribution, he was also one of the first to interest Irish presbyterians in the subject of missionary enterprise.

== Professor ==
In 1816 the general synod resolved to provide a theological training for its students instead of sending them to Scotland. Hanna, in June 1817, was unanimously elected professor of divinity and church history, with an emolument of £36.00 a year (he retained his congregation). His lectures were given at the Academical Institution, Belfast. In the following year he was made D.D. of Glasgow. In 1835 he obtained a coadjutor, Samuel Davidson, D.D., in the department of biblical criticism, and in 1837 was relieved of the departments of ecclesiastical history and pastoral theology by the appointment of James Seaton Reid, D.D., the historian. In 1840 Hanna was freed from active pastoral work by the election of William Gibson, D.D., as his assistant and successor at Rosemary Street. On 10 July 1840 he was chosen first Moderator of the General Assembly of the Presbyterian Church in Ireland, formed at that date by the union of the Synod of Ulster and the Secession Synod. This was an important moment in the history of that denomination, marked by two simultaneous processions leading to Hanna's church in Rosemary St.

== Family ==
In 1800 Hanna married Martha Gemmill from Scotland; they had two children, Eliza (married preacher James Denham) and a son, William, who was also a preacher.

== Works ==
- Love to Christ: An Incitement to Ministerial and Missionary Exertions (1822)
- Sympathy of Irish Presbyterians with the Church of Scotland (1840)

== Death and legacy ==
Hanna died at the residence of his son-in-law, Dr. Denham, at Derry, on 23 April 1852, in his eighty-first year. His portrait hangs in the hall of Union Theological College, Belfast. He published a few sermons and pamphlets, the earliest being his sermon as moderator of the general synod, Belfast, 1809.

== Sources ==
Belfast News Letter, 30 April 1852; Orthodox Presbyterian, May 1832, p. 288; James Seaton Reid's History of the Presbyterian Church in Ireland (Killen), 1867, iii. pp 447, 464, William Dool Killen's History of congregations of the Presbyterian Church in Ireland, 1886, pp.63-4, 126, 258-9

== Notes ==
Academic offices
| New creation | Professor of Theology of the Synod of Ulster; 1817–1840 | Succeeded by Himself and John Edgar as joint Professors of Theology of the Presbyterian Church in Ireland |
| Preceded by Himself as Professor of Theology of the Synod of Ulster; John Edgar as Professor of Theology of the Secession Synod | Professor of Theology of the Presbyterian Church in Ireland; 1840–1852; With: John Edgar | Succeeded by John Edgar |
Presbyterian Church titles
| New creation | Moderator of the Presbyterian Church in Ireland; 1840 | Succeeded by Henry Cooke (1841) |
