= Thomas Witherow =

Irish Minister And Historian

Thomas Witherow (1824–1890) was an Irish Presbyterian minister and historian.

== Life ==
The son of Hugh Witherow, a farmer at Aughlish, near Dungiven, County Londonderry, and his wife Elizabeth Martin, he was born at Ballycastle on 29 May 1824. He received his early education at Ralliagh church school, and then studied with James Bryce. Later on he went to Belfast Academy and the Royal Academical Institution.

In 1839 he entered the collegiate department of the Academical Institution, and here, with the exception of a session at Edinburgh, all his college days were spent.

In 1845 Witherow was licensed to preach by the presbytery of Glendermot, and in 1845 he was ordained at Maghera, Londonderry, by the presbytery of Magherafelt, as colleague to Charles Kennedy. In 1865, on the opening of Magee College, Londonderry, he was appointed by the General Assembly as Professor of Church History and Pastoral Theology. He served as curator of the college's library and museum between at least 1869-70 and 1888–89.

In 1878 Witherow was elected moderator of the Irish General Assembly, and in 1884 as a senator of the Royal University of Ireland. He was made hon. D.D. in 1883 by the Presbyterian Theological Faculty, Ireland, and LL.D. by the Royal University in 1885.

Witherow died on 25 January 1890 at Londonderry, and was buried in the city cemetery there.

== Works ==
Witherow's main works were:

- Three Prophets of our own, 1855.
- The Apostolic Church—which is it?, 1856. A Reply was published in 1867 by Rev. Thomas G. Porter
- Defence of the Apostolic Church, 1857.
- Scriptural Baptism; its Mode and Subjects, 1859.
- An inquiry into the scriptural form of Church government. Extracted and abridged from 'The Apostolic Church, 1867
- The New Testament Elder: His position, powers and duties in the Christian Church, 1873
- Derry and Enniskillen in the year 1689, 1873.
- The Boyne and Aghrim, 1879.
- Historical and Literary Memorials of Presbyterianism in Ireland (1623–1800), 2 vols. Vol 1, 1623-1731, Vol 2, 1731-1800, 1879.
- History of the Reformation; a primer, 1882.
- Life of Rev. A. P. Goudy, D.D., begun by Thomas Croskery, 1887.
- Two Diaries of Derry in 1689, being Richards's Diary of the Fleet and Ash's Journal of the Siege, with Introduction and Notes, 1888.
- The Form of the Christian Temple, 1889.

He was a contributor to the British and Foreign Evangelical Review, the Belfast Witness, and the Londonderry Standard, and was one of the editors of the Presbyterian Review.

== Family ==
Witherow married Catharine, daughter of Thomas Milling of Maghera. They had seven daughters and three sons.

== Notes ==
Attribution

This article incorporates text from a publication now in the public domain: Lee, Sidney, ed. (1900). "Witherow, Thomas". Dictionary of National Biography. Vol. 62. London: Smith, Elder & Co.

Academic offices
New title	Professor of Church History and Pastoral Theology at Magee College, Derry, County Londonderry; 1865-90	Succeeded by J. Edgar Henry
Presbyterian Church titles
Preceded by George Bellis (1877)	Moderator of the Presbyterian Church in Ireland; 1878	Succeeded by Robert Watts (1879)
