= William Dool Killen =

Irish ecclesiastical historian (1806 – 1902)

William Dool Killen (16 April 1806 – 10 January 1902) was a minister of the Presbyterian Church in Ireland and church historian.

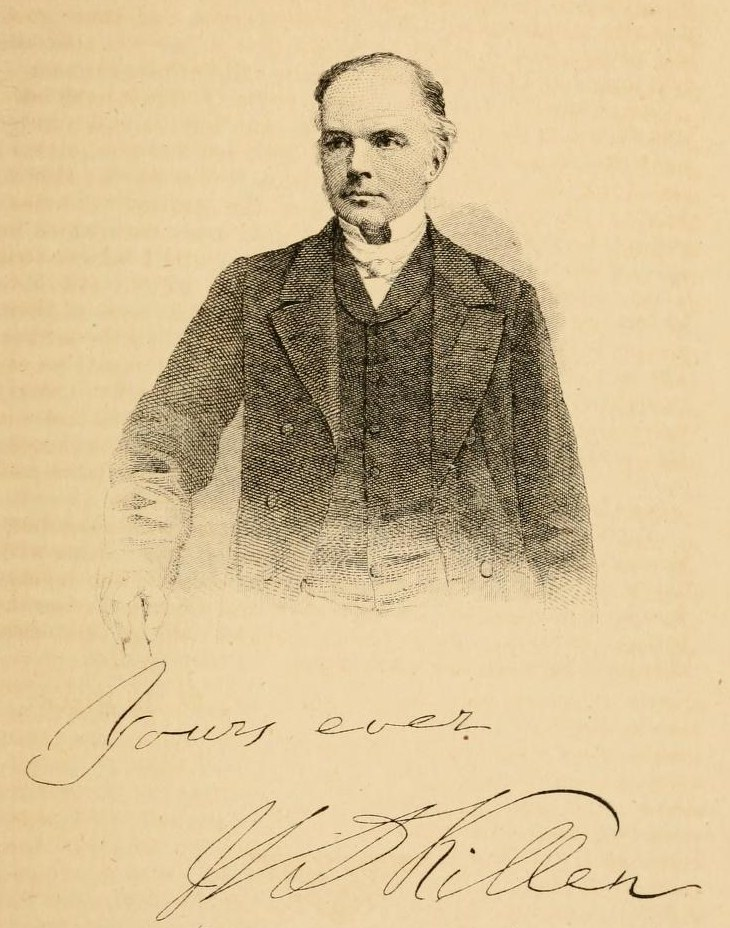
William Dool Killen

== Life ==
Born at Church Street, Ballymena, County Antrim, on 16 April 1806, he was third of four sons and nine children of John Killen (1768–1828), a grocer and seedsman in Ballymena, by his wife Martha, daughter of Jesse Dool, a farmer in Duneane. His paternal grandfather, a farmer at Carnmoney, married Blanche Brice, a descendant of Edward Brice; a brother, James Miller Killen (1815–1879) was a minister in Comber, County Down. Thomas Young Killen Moderator, in 1882, of the General Assembly of the Presbyterian Church in Ireland was his father's great-nephew.

After attending local primary schools, Killen went around 1816 to Ballymena Academy, and in November 1821 entered the collegiate department of the Royal Academical Institution, Belfast, under James Thomson. He was in 1827 licensed to preach by the Presbytery of Ballymena, and on 11 November 1829 ordained minister at Raphoe, County Donegal.

In July 1841 Killen was appointed, by the General Assembly of the Presbyterian Church in Ireland, its professor of church history, ecclesiastical government, and pastoral theology, in succession to James Seaton Reid. He concentrated on history. When Assembly's College, Belfast was set up in 1853, he became one of the professors there. In 1869 he was appointed president of the college, in succession to Henry Cooke, and undertook to fundraise for professorial endowments and new buildings.

In 1889 Killen resigned his chair but continued as president. He died on 10 January 1902, and was buried in Balmoral Cemetery, Belfast, where a monument marked his resting place. He received the degrees of D.D. (1845) and of LL.D. (1901) from the University of Glasgow. His portrait, painted by Richard Hooke, hung in the Gamble Library of the Assembly's College.

== Works ==
Killen wrote extensively on history. His major works were:

- Continuation of James Seaton Reid's History of the Presbyterian Church in Ireland to 1841, Belfast, 1853.
- The Ancient Church. Its History, Doctrine, Worship, and Constitution traced for the First Three Hundred Years, 1859.
- Memoir of John Edgar, D.D., LL.D., Belfast, 1867.
- The Old Catholic Church. The History, Doctrine, Worship, and Polity of the Christians traced from the Apostolic Age to the Establishment of the Pope as a Temporal Sovereign, A.D. 755, Edinburgh, 1871.
- The Ecclesiastical History of Ireland from the Earliest Period to the Present Times, 2 vols. 1875.
- The Ignatian Epistles entirely Spurious. A Reply to Bishop Lightfoot, Edinburgh, 1886.
- The Framework of the Church. A Treatise on Church Government, Edinburgh, 1890.
- Reminiscences of a Long Life, 1901.

He edited, with introductions and notes:

- The Siege of Derry, by John Mackenzie, Belfast, 1861.
- The Rise and Progress of the Presbyterian Government in the North of Ireland, by Patrick Adair.
- History of the Church of Ireland, by Andrew Stewart, Belfast, 1866.
- History of Congregations of the Presbyterian Church in Ireland, mainly by James Seaton Reid, Belfast, 1886.

Killen took part in a bitter controversy concerning the relative merits of prelacy and presbyterianism, which was provoked by four sermons preached in 1837 in St Columb's Cathedral, Derry, by Archibald Boyd. Killen and three other Presbyterian ministers replied in four sermons preached in Derry and published in 1839 with the title: Presbyterianism Defended.... A reply from Boyd and counter-replies from the four ministers ensued. One of these, The Plea of Presbytery (1840), which reached a third edition, earned for its authors a vote of thanks from the Synod of Ulster.

== Family ==
Killen married in 1830 Anne (d. 1886), third daughter of Thomas Young of Ballymena, by whom he had three sons and five daughters.

== Notes ==
Attribution This article incorporates text from a publication now in the public domain: Lee, Sidney, ed. (1912). "Killen, William Dool". Dictionary of National Biography (2nd supplement). Vol. 2. London: Smith, Elder & Co.

Academic offices
Preceded by James Seaton Reid	Professor of Church History of the Presbyterian Church in Ireland; 1841-89	Succeeded by James Heron
Academic offices
Preceded by Henry Cooke	President of Assembly's College, Belfast; 1869-1902	Succeeded by Matthew Leitch
