= Balmoral Cemetery =

Balmoral Cemetery may refer to:

- Balmoral Cemetery, Belfast, Northern Ireland
- Balmoral Cemetery, Brisbane, Queensland, Australia
