= Thomas Chalmers =

Scottish clergyman, writer and historian (1780 – 1847)

The Reverend Thomas Chalmers FRSE
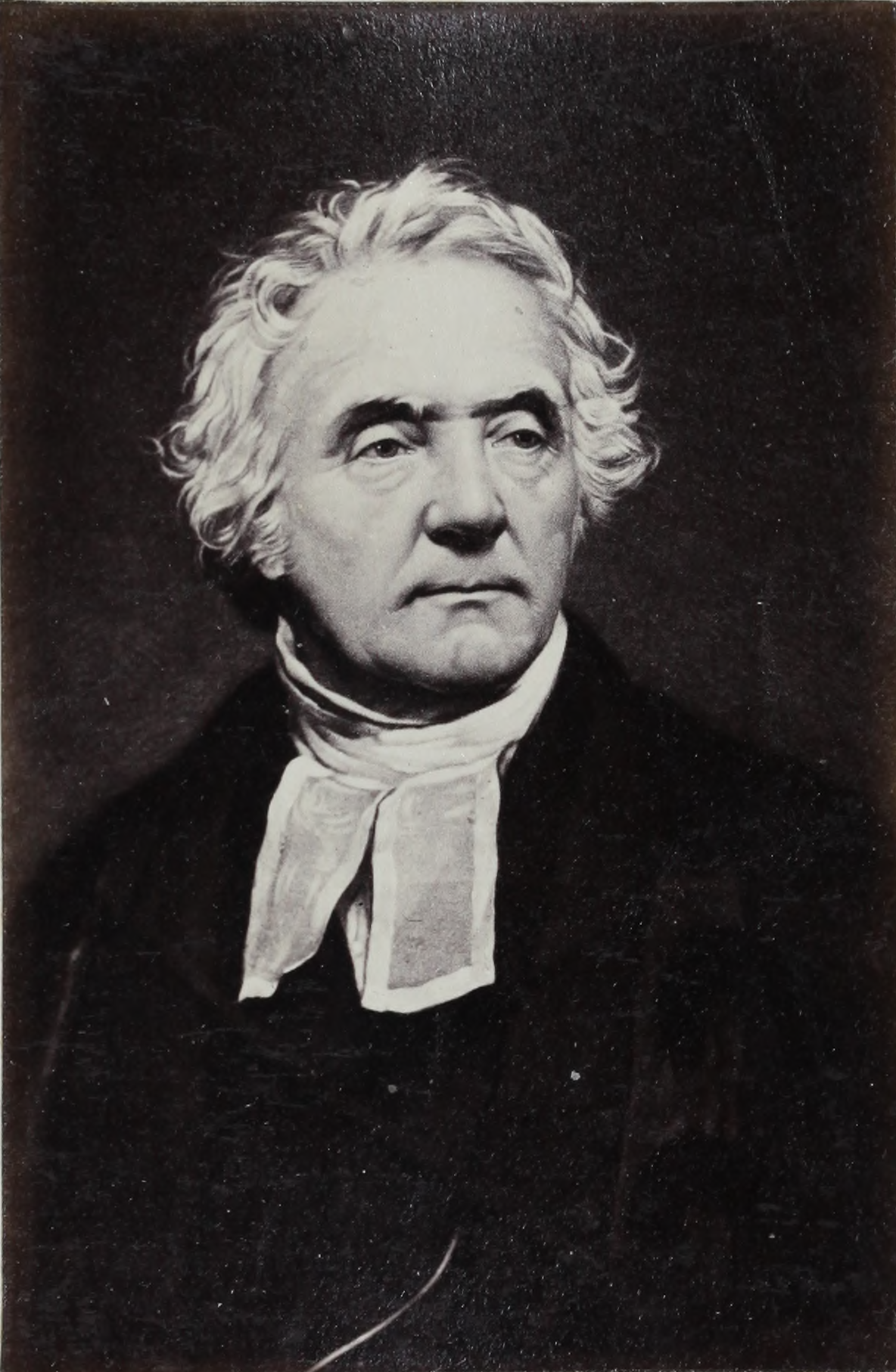
- Thomas Chalmers by John Faed, 1847
- Born: 17 March 1780; Anstruther, Fife, Scotland
- Died: 31 May 1847; Edinburgh, Scotland
- Education: University of St Andrews; University of Edinburgh
- Occupations: Theologian, Presbyterian minister
- Theological work
- Tradition or movement: Presbyterianism

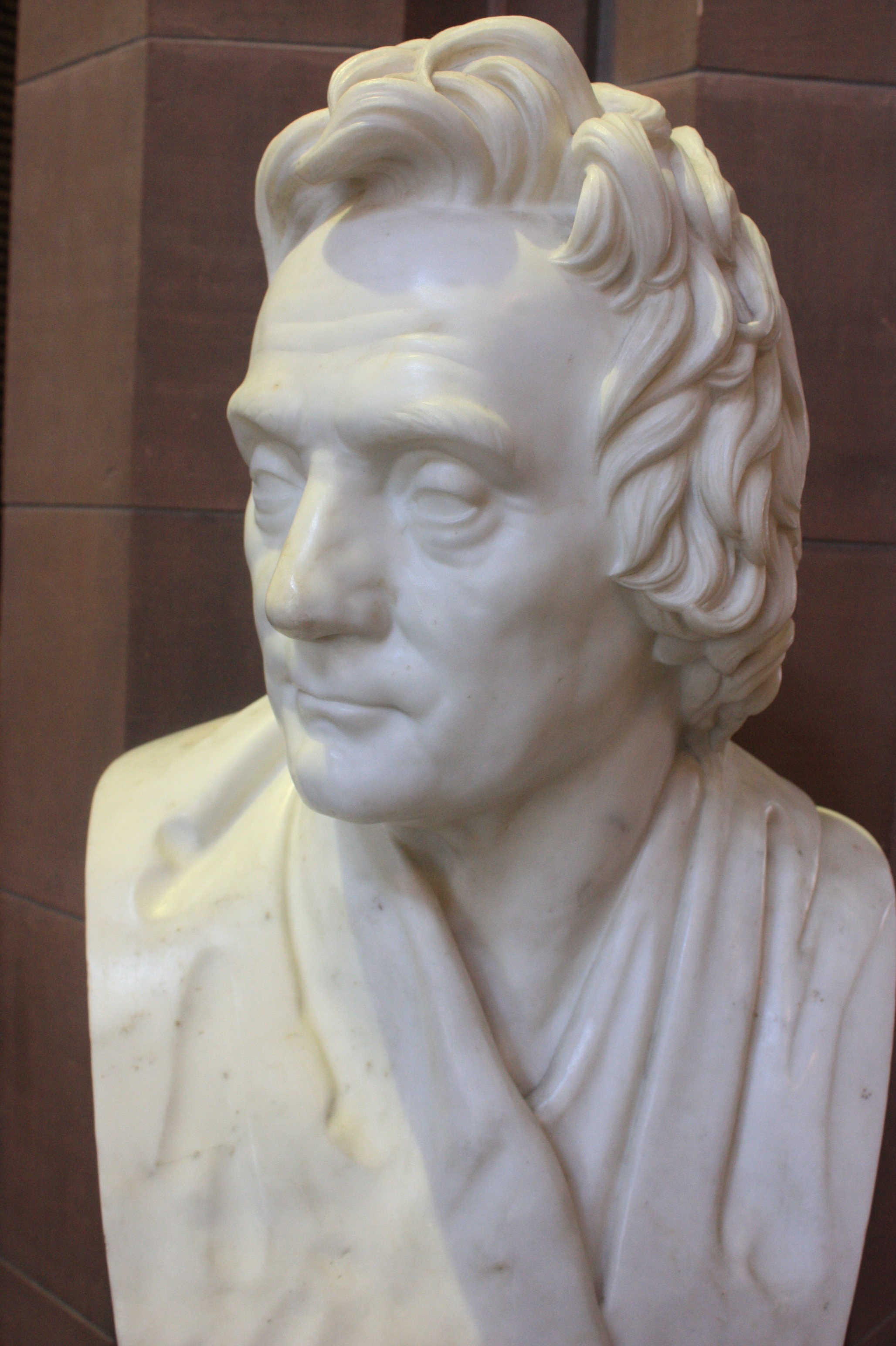
Sir John Steell, Rev Thomas Chalmers, 1883, Scottish National Portrait Gallery

Thomas Chalmers FRSE (17 March 1780 – 31 May 1847), was a Scottish Presbyterian minister, professor of theology, political economist, and a leader of both the Church of Scotland and of the Free Church of Scotland. He has been called "Scotland's greatest nineteenth-century churchman".

He served as Vice-president of the Royal Society of Edinburgh from 1835 to 1842.

The New Zealand town of Port Chalmers was named after Chalmers. A bust of Chalmers is on display in the Hall of Heroes of the National Wallace Monument in Stirling.

The Thomas Chalmers Centre in Kirkliston is named after him.

== Early life ==
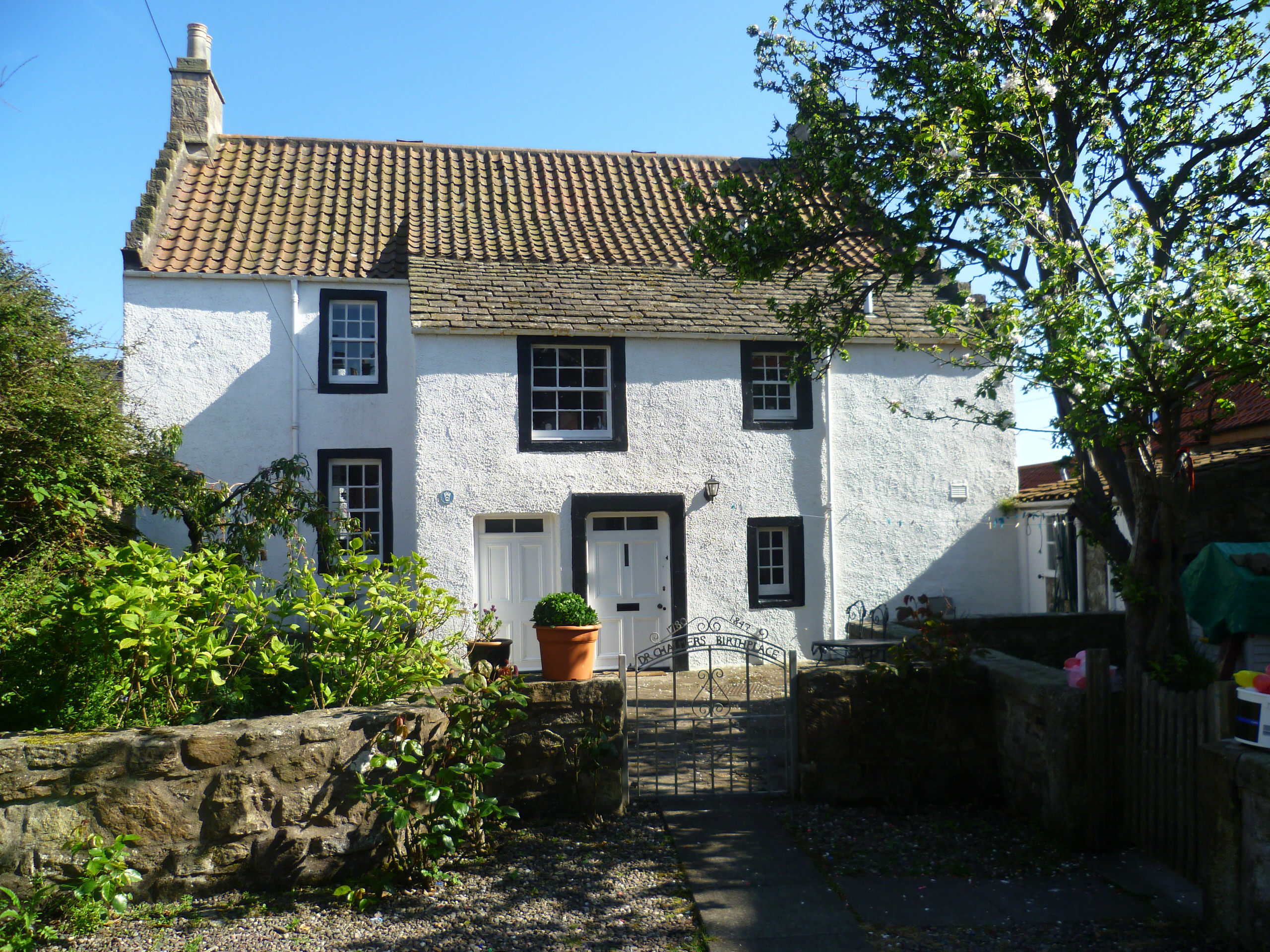
Chalmers' birthplace in Anstruther

He was born at Anstruther in Fife, the son of Elizabeth Hall and John Chalmers, a merchant.

Age 11 Chalmers attended the University of St Andrews studying mathematics. In January 1799 he was licensed as a preacher of the gospel by the St Andrews presbytery. In May 1803, after attending further courses of lectures at the University of Edinburgh, and acting as assistant to the professor of mathematics at St Andrews, he was ordained as minister of Kilmany, about 9 miles from the university town, where he continued to lecture. Kilmany was a small and predominantly agricultural parish, with a population under 800 in 1811.

== Lecturer and minister ==
Chalmers made an issue within the University of St Andrews of the quality of mathematics teaching. It came to involve attacks on John Rotheram, the professor of natural philosophy. His mathematical lectures roused enthusiasm, but they were discontinued by order of the authorities. Chalmers then opened mathematical classes on his own account which attracted many students; at the same time he delivered a course of lectures on chemistry, and ministered to his parish at Kilmany. In 1805 he became a candidate for the vacant professorship of mathematics at the University of Edinburgh, but was unsuccessful.

In 1815 he became minister of the Tron Church, Glasgow, in spite of determined opposition to him in the town council on the grounds of his evangelical teaching. From Glasgow his reputation as a preacher spread throughout the United Kingdom. When he visited London Samuel Wilberforce wrote, "all the world is wild about Dr Chalmers." At this time he lived at Wellington Place in Glasgow.

== Parochial work ==
In November 1817 Chalmers used a memorial sermon for Princess Charlotte of Wales to appeal for a Christian effort to deal with the social condition of Glasgow. His parish contained about 11,000 persons, and of these about one-third were not connected with any church. He considered that parochial organizations had not kept pace in the city with the growing population. He declared that twenty new churches, with parishes, should be erected in Glasgow; and he set to work to revive the old parochial economy of Scotland. The town council agreed to build one new church, attaching to it a parish of 10,000 persons, mostly weavers, labourers and factory workers, and this church was offered to Chalmers.

In September 1819 he became minister of the church and parish of St John, where of 2000 families more than 800 had no connection with any Christian church. He first addressed himself to providing schools for the children. Two school-houses with four endowed teachers were established, where 700 children were taught, at moderate fees. Between 40 and 50 local Sabbath schools were opened, where more than 1000 children were taught. The parish was divided into 25 districts with 60 to 100 families. Chalmers was the centre of the whole system, visiting families and holding evening meetings.

== Moral philosopher and theologian ==
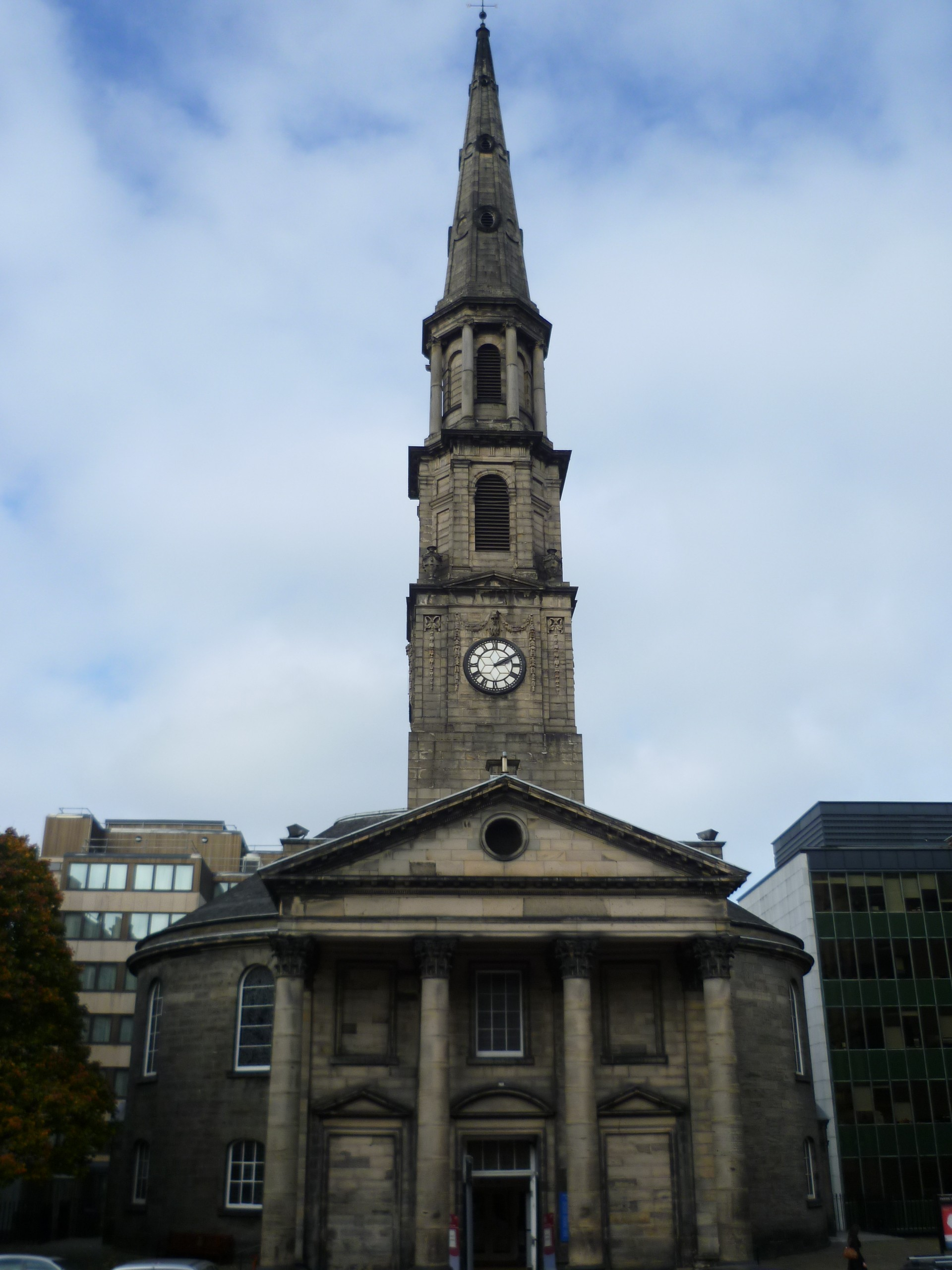
St. Andrew's Church, Edinburgh, scene of the Disruption

In 1823 Chalmers accepted the chair of moral philosophy at the University of St Andrews, the seventh academic offer made to him during his eight years in Glasgow. His lectures led some students to devote themselves to missionary effort. Among his pupils were William Lindsay Alexander, Alexander Duff, and James Aitken Wylie. At this period Robert Morrison and Joshua Marshman visited St Andrews.

In November 1828 Chalmers was transferred to the chair of theology at the University of Edinburgh. He then introduced the practice of following the lecture with a viva voce examination on what had been delivered. He also introduced text-books.

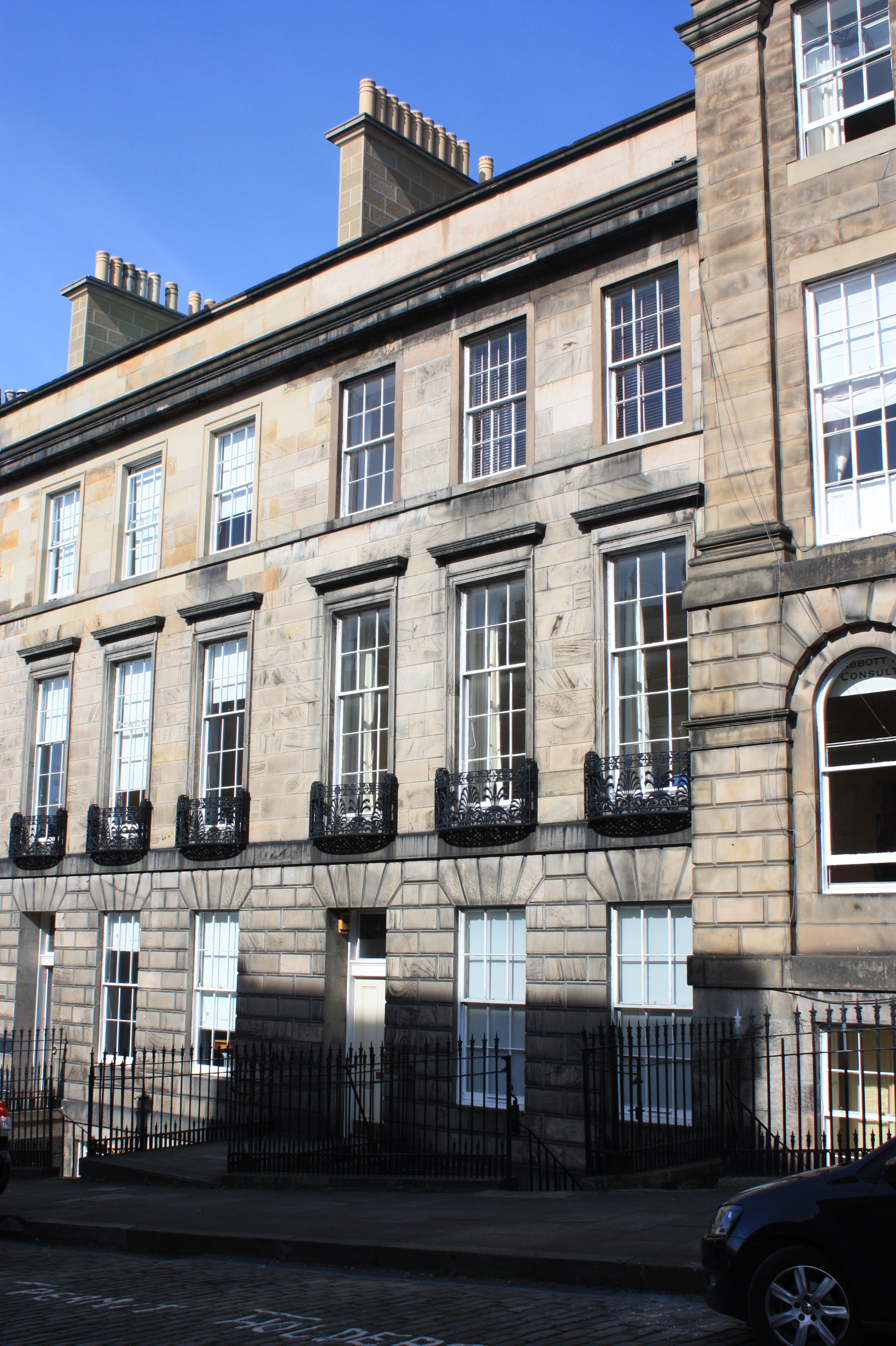
Chalmers' townhouse on the Moray Estate, 3 Forres Street, Edinburgh

In 1834 Chalmers was elected fellow of the Royal Society of Edinburgh, and in the same year he became corresponding member of the Institute of France; in 1835 Oxford conferred on him the degree of DCL. At this time he was living at 3 Forres Street on the Moray Estate in the west end of Edinburgh.

In 1834 he became leader of the evangelical section of the Scottish Church in the General Assembly. He was appointed chairman of a committee for church extension, and in that capacity made a tour through a large part of Scotland, addressing presbyteries and holding public meetings. He also issued numerous appeals, with the result that in 1841, when he resigned his office as convener of the church extension committee, he was able to announce that in seven years upwards of £300,000 had been contributed, and 220 new churches had been built. His efforts to induce the Whig government to assist in this effort were unsuccessful.

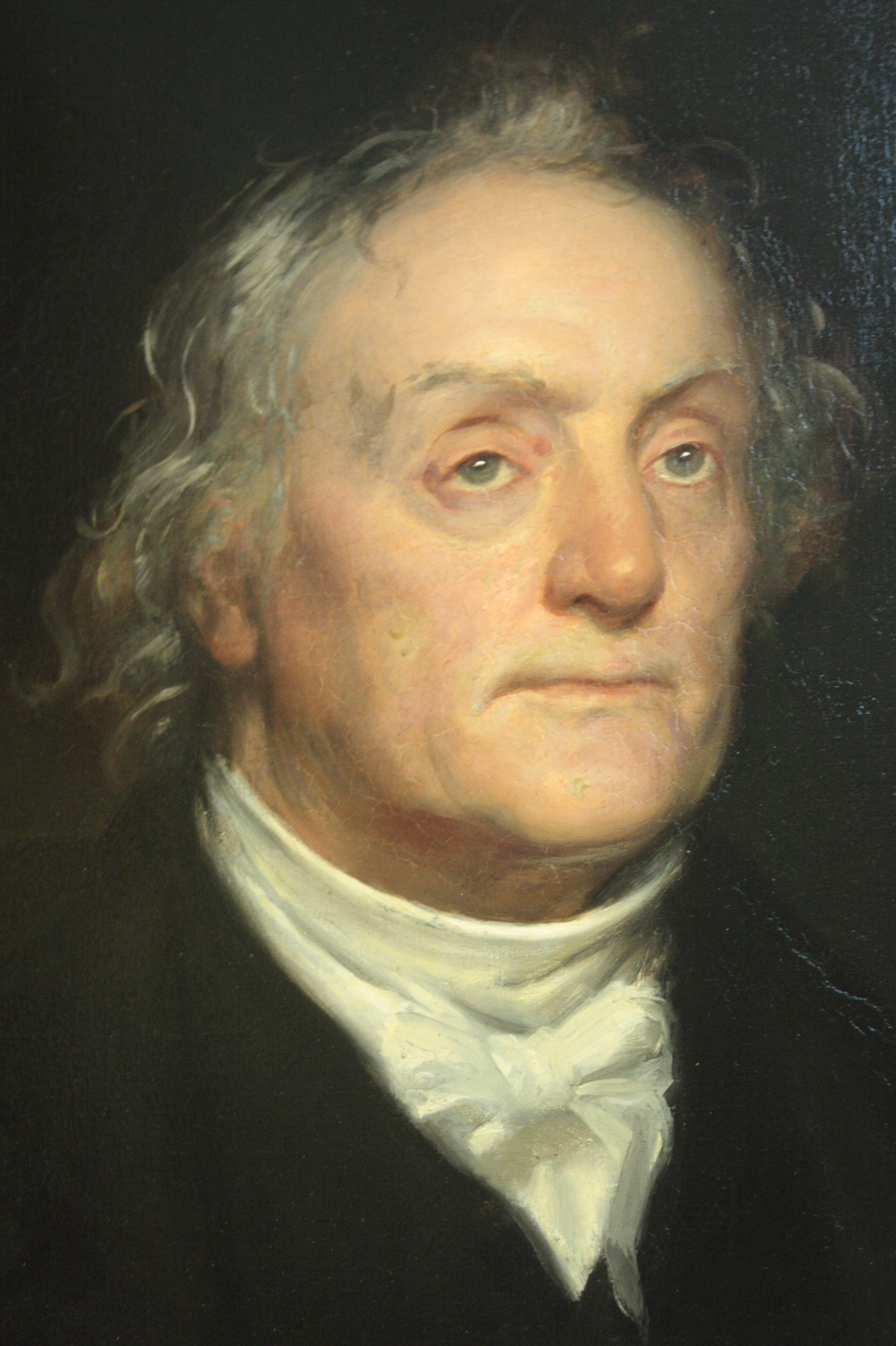
Rev Thomas Chalmers by Thomas Duncan, 1840

In 1840 Chalmers was unsuccessful in applying for the chair of divinity at the University of Glasgow. It went to the Moderate Alexander Hill.

== Non-intrusionism and the Free Church ==
Chalmers found himself at the head of the party in the Church of Scotland which stood for "non-intrusionism": the principle that no minister should be intruded into any parish contrary to the will of the congregation. Cases of conflict between the church and the civil power arose in Auchterarder, Dunkeld and Marnoch. The courts made it clear that the Church, in their opinion, held its temporalities on condition of rendering such obedience as the courts required. The Church then appealed to the government for relief. In political manoeuvres with Westminster politicians, Chalmers was opposed by John Hope.

In January 1843 the government put a final negative on the church's claims for spiritual independence. The non-intrusionist movement ended in the Disruption: on 18 May 1843, 470 clergy withdrew from the general assembly and constituted themselves the Free Church of Scotland, with Chalmers as moderator. He had prepared a sustentation fund scheme for the support of the seceding ministers.

In 1844, Chalmers announced a church extension campaign, for new building. In 1846 he became the first principal of the Divinity Hall of the Free Church of Scotland, as it was initially called.

Later in life he was quoted as saying: "Who cares about the Free Church compared with the Christian good of the people of Scotland? Who cares for any Church, but as an instrument of Christian good?"

== Death ==
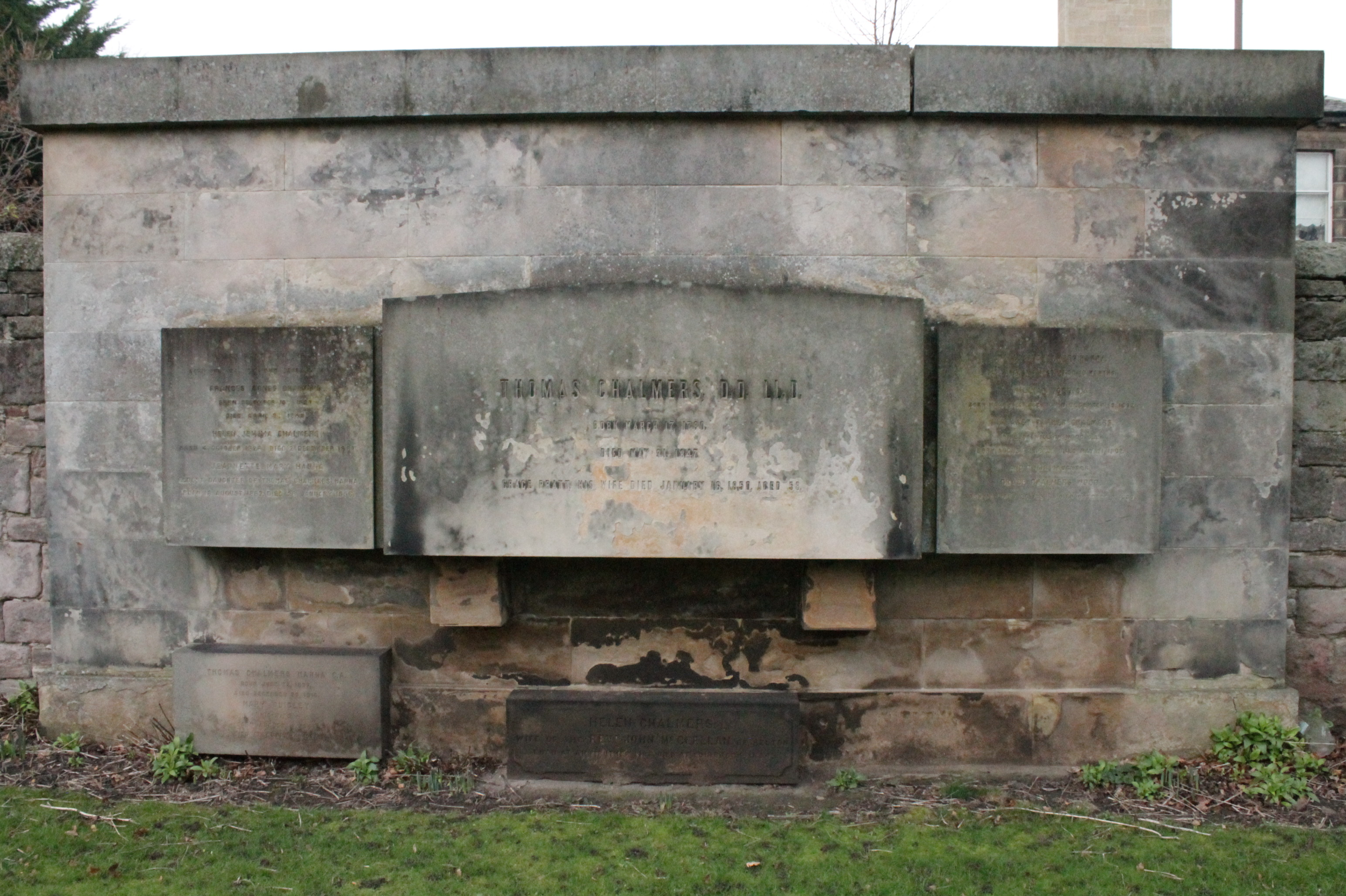
The grave of Rev Thomas Chalmers, Grange Cemetery

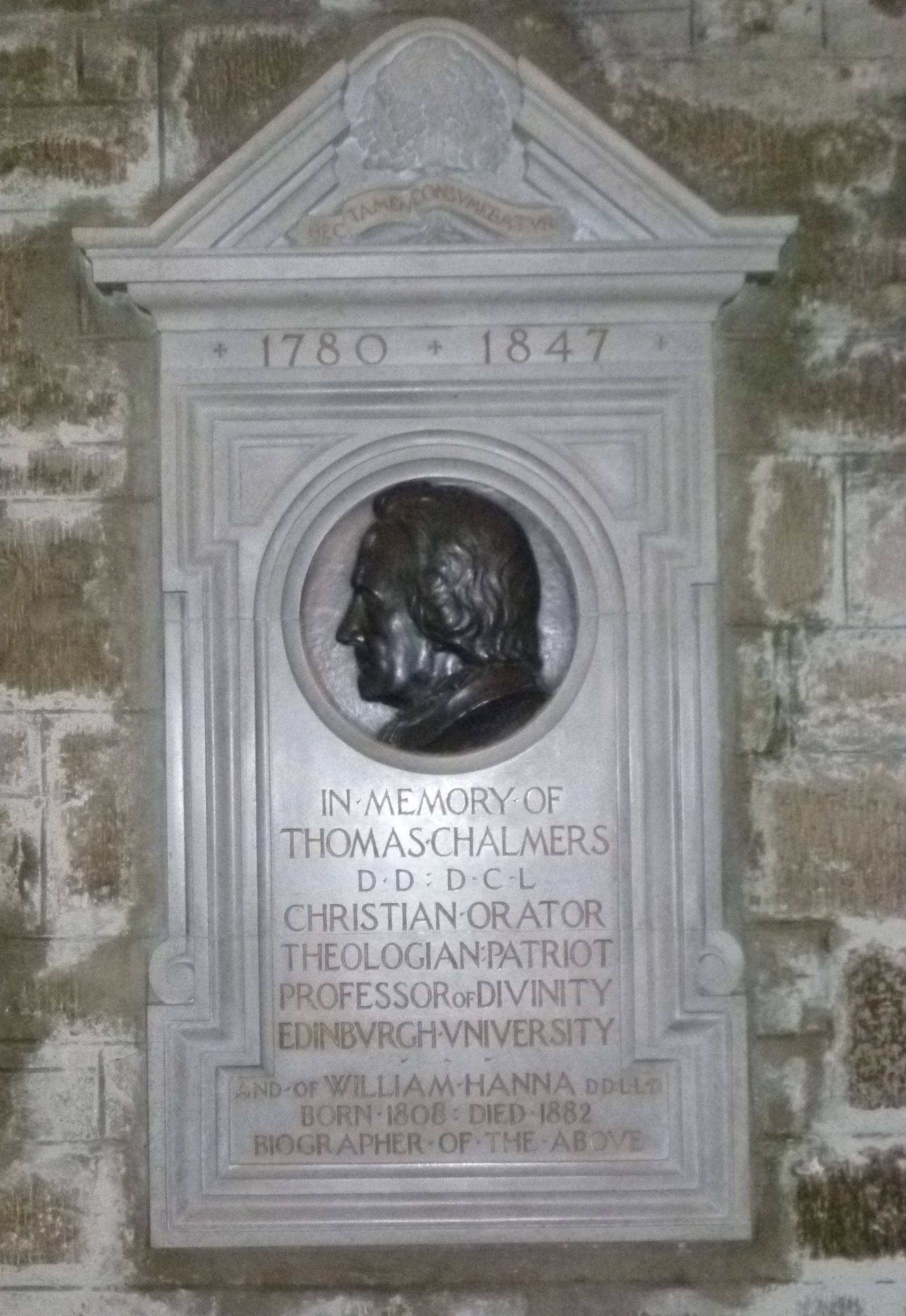
Memorial plaque in St. Giles, Edinburgh

On 28 May 1847 Chalmers returned to his house at Church Hill in Morningside, near Edinburgh, from a journey to London on the subject of national education. On the following day (Saturday) he was employed in preparing a report to the General Assembly of the Free Church, then sitting. On Sunday, the 30th, he continued in his usual health and spirits, and retired to rest with the intention of rising at an early hour to finish his report. The next morning he did not make his appearance, and he was discovered lying dead in bed.

Chalmers was interred in the Grange Cemetery on 4 June, the very first burial in that cemetery. His grave is on the north wall, near the north-west access. A large crowd of persons of all denominations accompanied his remains to the grave. His wife Grace Pratt died 16 January 1850 and is buried with him, as is his daughter Grace Pratt Chalmers (1819–1851) and two of his other six daughters. James Sievewright, the moderator on the year he died, preached a eulogy.

== Works ==
Chalmers's academic years resulted in a prolific literature of various kinds: his writings fill more than 30 volumes. Contemporaries regarded him highly as a natural theologian. A series of sermons on the relation between the discoveries of astronomy and the Christian revelation was published in January 1817, and within a year nine editions and 20,000 copies were in circulation.

=== Political economy ===
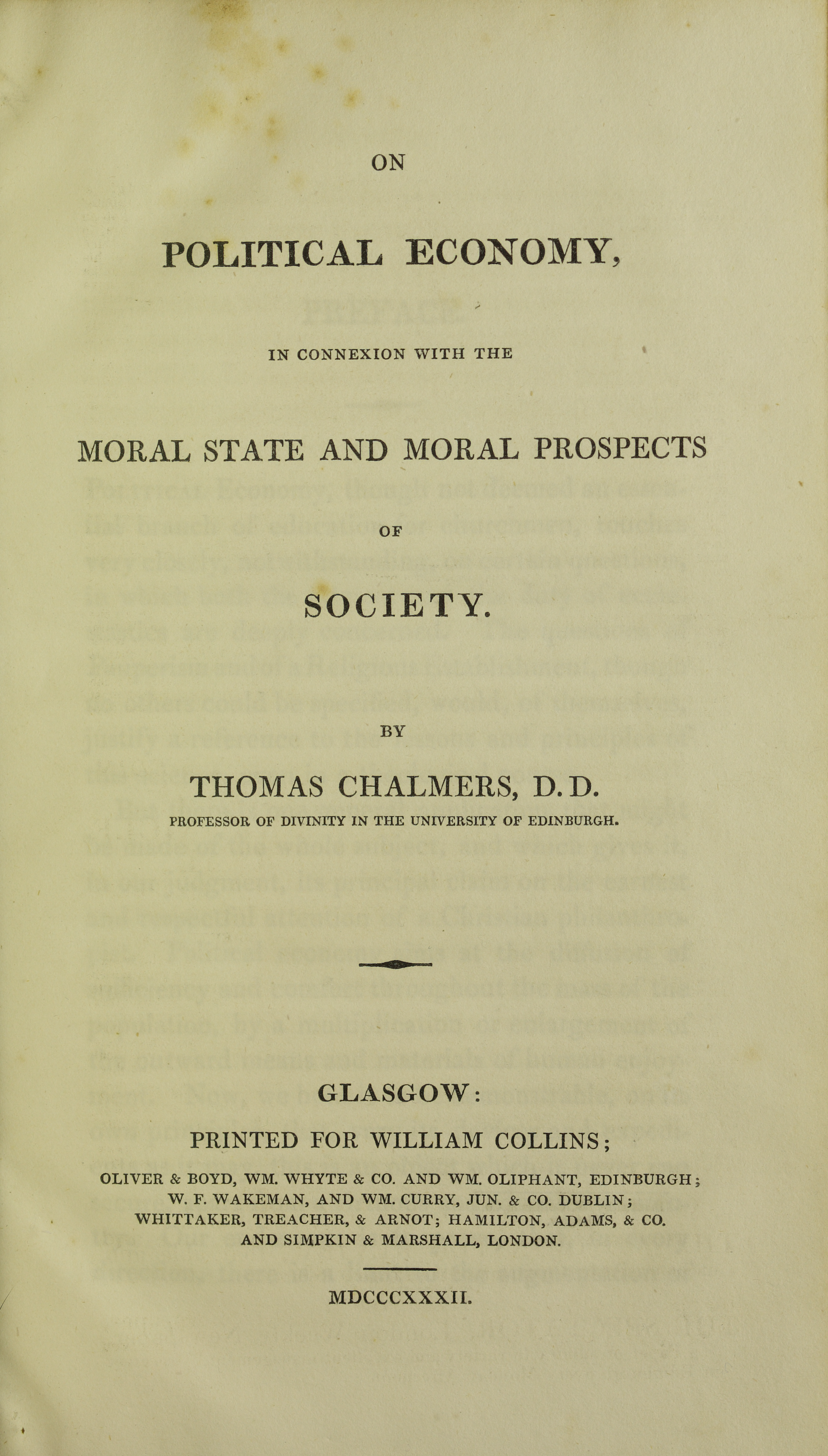
On political economy, 1832

In 1808 Chalmers published an Inquiry into the Extent and Stability of National Resources, a contribution to the discussion created by Bonaparte's commercial policy. He argued for a taxation of "the excess of income above that which is laid out in purchasing the necessaries of existence," and argued that there should be a personal (tax-free) allowance in income taxation. He argued for the necessity of taxation to sustain valid state expenditures, "if taxes were rightly laid, and the produce of them rightly expended, they admit of being most beneficially increased for the best interests of the nation; and with no other sacrifice, than a sacrifice of luxury and splendour on the part of the landed proprietors."

As a political economist he first dealt with: the relationship between the degree of the fertility of the soil and the social condition of a community; capital accumulation; and the general doctrine of a limit to all the modes by which national wealth may accumulate. He was the first also to advance that argument in favour of religious establishments which met on its own ground the doctrine of Adam Smith, that religion—like other things—should be left to the operation of the law of supply and demand.

In 1826 he published a third volume of The Christian and Civic Economy of Large Towns, a continuation of work begun at St John's, Glasgow. In 1832 he published a Political Economy, the chief purpose of which was to argue that the right economic condition of the masses is dependent on their right moral condition, so that character is the parent of comfort, not vice versa.

=== Poor law reform ===
Parochial machinery gave Chalmers experience in dealing with the problem of poor relief. He became an influential thinker on poverty. Chalmers was a Malthusian in his belief that the cause of pauperism was the poor having too many children. He also thought that poor-relief officials should be tenured and business-like; and voluntary taxation was the correct way to support poor relief.

When Chalmers undertook the management of the parish of St John's, the poor of the parish cost the city £1400 per annum, and in four years the pauper expenditure was reduced to £280 per annum. The investigation of new applications for relief was given to the deacon of the district, and an effort was made to enable the poor to help themselves. At this time there were few parishes north of the Forth and Clyde where there was a compulsory assessment for the poor, but the English method of assessment was spreading. Chalmers opposed compulsory assessment as counter-productive, and believed that relief should instead be raised and administered by voluntary means. It has been argued that Chalmers was both a paternalist, on the moral plane, and a supporter of economic individualism.

Critics replied to Chalmers that his approach was impossible in large cities. William Pulteney Alison engaged in controversy with him; Chalmers countered with moral arguments. In arguing that private charity should outweigh public expenditure in relieving poverty, he was one of a group of British writers of the period of similar views, that included also Samuel Richard Bosanquet, Thomas Mozley and Frederick Oakeley. The views from Chalmers and Edinburgh had a notable effect in Wales, through Lewis Edwards, Y Traethodydd, and Owen Thomas.

=== Moralist ===
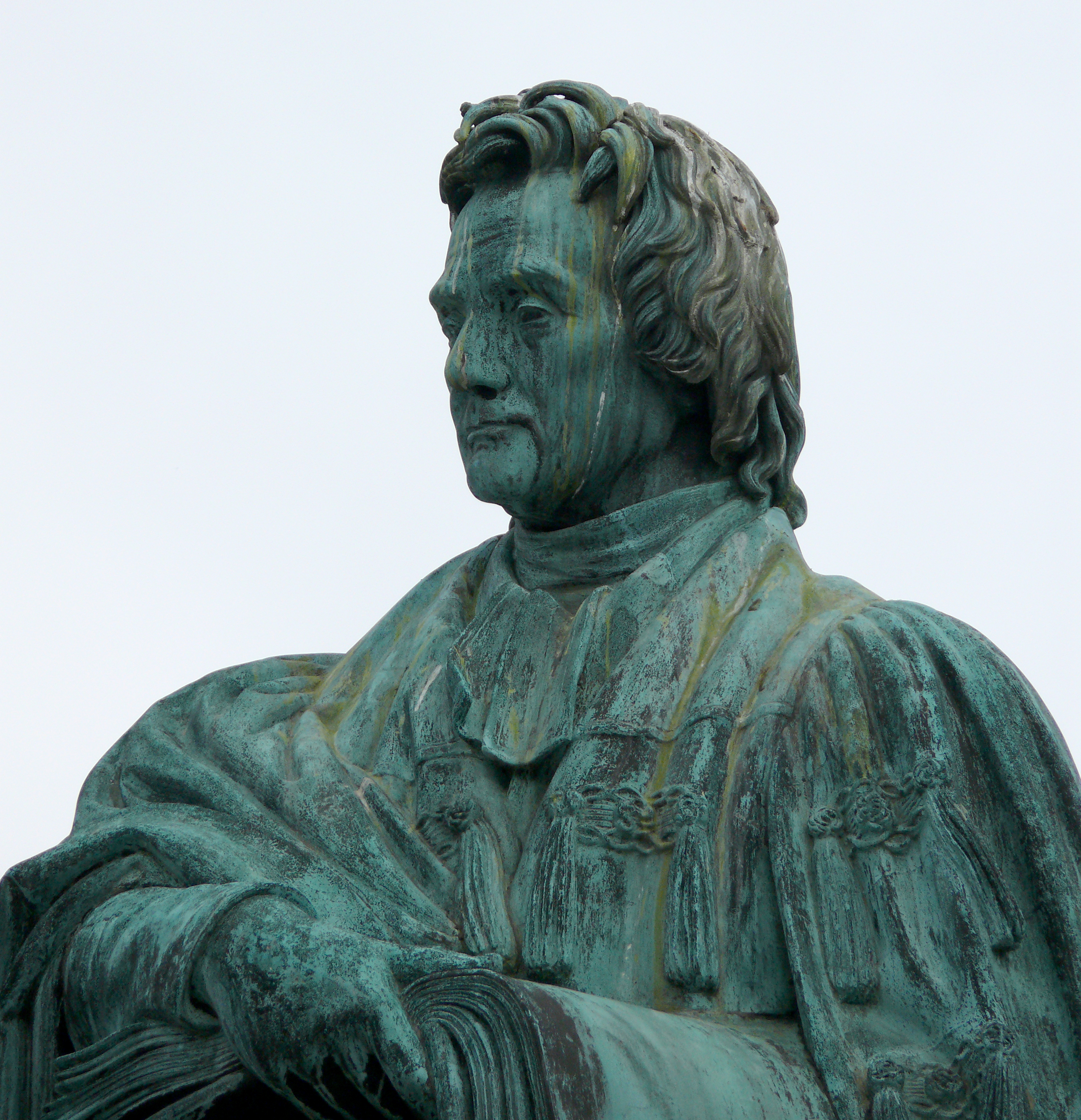
John Steell, Thomas Chalmers, statue, Edinburgh

In his St Andrews lectures Chalmers excluded mental philosophy and included the whole sphere of moral obligation, dealing with man's duty to God and to his fellow-men in the light of Christian teaching. Many of his lectures were printed in the first and second volumes of his published works.

In the field of ethics he made contributions in regard to the place and functions of volition and attention, the separate and underived character of the moral sentiments, and the distinction between the virtues of perfect and imperfect obligation.

=== Religion ===
At his own request the article on Christianity was assigned to him in David Brewster's Edinburgh Encyclopædia. The separate publication of this article, and contributions to the Edinburgh Christian Instructor and The Eclectic Review, enhanced his reputation as an author.

Chalmers's writings are a source for argument and illustration on the question of Establishment. "I have no veneration", he said to the royal commissioners in St Andrews, before either the voluntary or the non-intrusive controversies had arisen, "for the Church of Scotland qua an establishment, but I have the utmost veneration for it qua an instrument of Christian good."

=== Natural theology ===
Chalmers' Bridgewater Treatise, in the series On the Power, Wisdom and Goodness of God as Manifested in the Adaptation of External Nature to the Moral and Intellectual Constitution of Man, appeared in two volumes 1833 and went through 6 editions. As noted by Robert M. Young, these books effectively represent an encyclopedia of pre-evolutionary natural history, commissioned and published whilst Charles Darwin was on board the Beagle.

In the area of natural theology and the Christian evidences he advocated the method of reconciling the Mosaic narrative with the indefinite antiquity of the globe which William Buckland advanced in his Bridgewater Treatises, and which Chalmers had previously communicated to him.

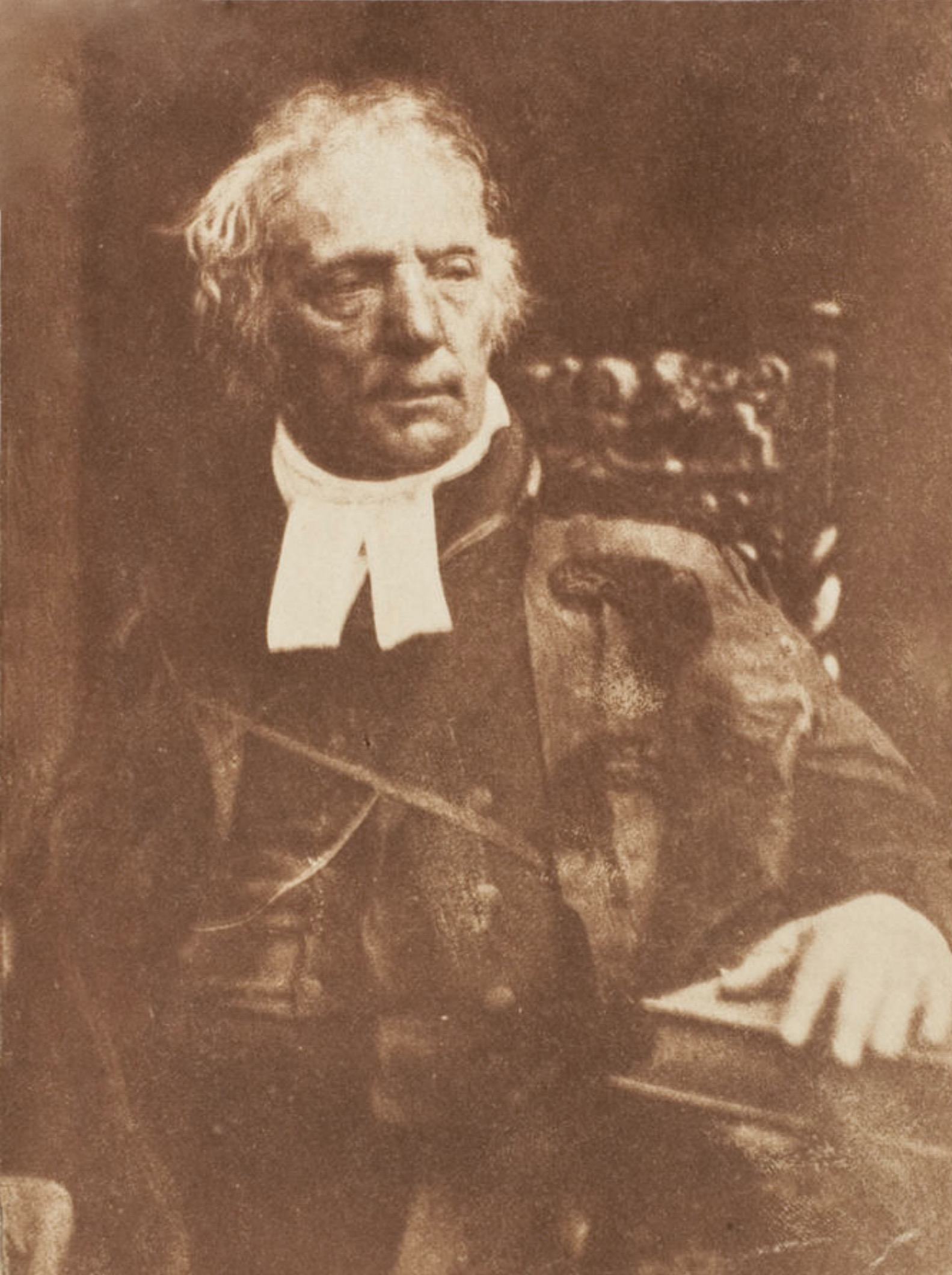
David Octavius Hill, Thomas Chalmers, c. 1845

=== Gap creationism ===
In 1814 Chalmers lectured on the concept of gap creationism, also known as the "gap theory", and subsequently spread its popularity of this idea which he credited to Episcopius. He wrote of Genesis 1:1: "My own opinion, as published in 1814, is that it forms no part of the first day but refers to a period of indefinite antiquity when God created the worlds out of nothing. The commencement of the first day's work I hold to be the moving of God's Spirit upon the face of the waters. We can allow geology the amplest time ... without infringing even on the literalities of the Mosaic record."

Chalmers Lighthouse in Anstruther

This form of old Earth creationism posits that the six-day creation, as described in the Book of Genesis, involved literal 24-hour days, but that there was a gap of time between two distinct creations in the first and the second verses of Genesis, explaining many scientific observations, including the age of the Earth. Gap creationism differs from day-age creationism (which posits that the "days" of creation were much longer periods - of thousands or millions of years), and from young Earth creationism (which although it agrees concerning the six literal 24-hour days of creation, does not posit any gap of time).

The "New College", as the Divinity School became known, was a centre of opposition to the Vestiges of the Natural History of Creation (1844). Chalmers himself did not mention the work, but indirectly attacked its view of development in writing for the North British Review.

== Family ==
Chalmers and his wife, Grace, had six daughters. Chalmers' eldest daughter Anne married William Hanna, who wrote a long biography of his father-in-law. His second eldest daughter, Elizabeth (Eliza) Mackenzie, travelled to Therapia during the Crimean War to work as a Superintendent of nurses.

His brother, Charles Chalmers, founded the Merchiston Castle School. Charles' son, David (Thomas' nephew) was a noted industrialist and owner of the Cowan & Co. paperworks.

== Bibliography ==
- Brown, Stewart J. (1982). Thomas Chalmers and the Godly Commonwealth in Scotland. Oxford [Oxfordshire]: Oxford University Press. ISBN 0-19-213114-1. OCLC 8532756.
- Topham, Jonathan R. (2022). Reading the Book of Nature How Eight Best Sellers Reconnected Christianity and the Sciences on the Eve of the Victorian Age. Chicago: University of Chicago Press. ISBN 978-0-226-82080-4. OCLC 1338838756.
- Young, Professor Robert M (1994) [1985, 1988], "Malthus and the Evolutionists: the common context of biological and social theory", Darwin's Metaphor: Nature's Place in Victorian Culture, Cambridge University Press.

Attribution

- This article incorporates text from a publication now in the public domain: Blaikie, William Garden (1887). "Chalmers, Thomas". In Stephen, Leslie (ed.). Dictionary of National Biography. Vol. 9. London: Smith, Elder & Co. p. 449–454. Endnotes:
  - Memoirs by his son-in-law, W. Hanna, LL.D., 4 vols. 1849–52;
  - Selection from Correspondence, 1 vol.;
  - Biographical Notice from Transactions of Royal Society of Edin., by Dean Ramsay; North British Review, May 1852 and November 1856 (articles ascribed to Isaac Taylor);
  - Peter's Letters to his Kinsfolk (John Gibson Lockhart);
  - Carlyle's Reminiscences, vol. i.;
  - McCosh's Scottish Philosophy;
  - The Chalmers' Lectures, 1st series, by Rev. Sir Henry W. Moncreiff, bart., D.D.;
  - Records of General Assembly of the Free Church, 1849;
  - Witness newspaper, 1 and 9 June 1849;
  - Dodds's Thomas Chalmers, a Biographical Study;
  - Walker's Thomas Chalmers;
  - Fraser's Men worth Remembering;
  - Chalmers's Proceedings at the Centennial Celebration of the Birth of Dr. Chalmers, 1880.
