= William Garden Blaikie =

Scottish minister, writer, biographer and temperance reformer

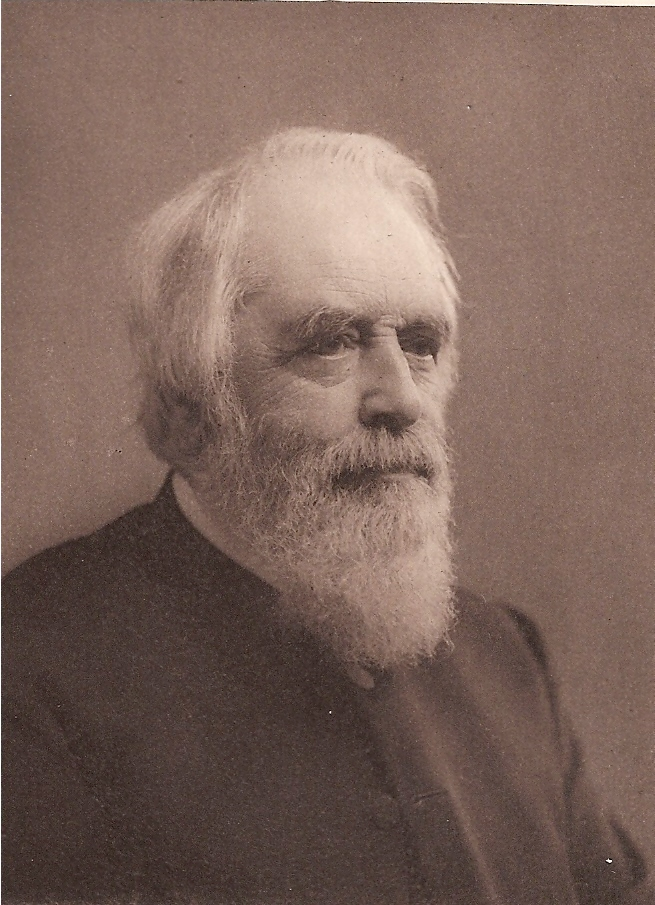
- Rev Prof William Garden Blaikie
- Born: 5 February 1820; Aberdeen, Scotland
- Died: 11 June 1899 (aged 79)
- Occupations: Theologian writer Temperance reformer Moderator of the General Assembly of the Free Church of Scotland (1892)
- Spouse: Margaret Catherine Biggar (1823–1915)
- Children: 12
- Parent(s): James Ogilvie Blaikie (1786–1836); Jane Garden (1794–1857)

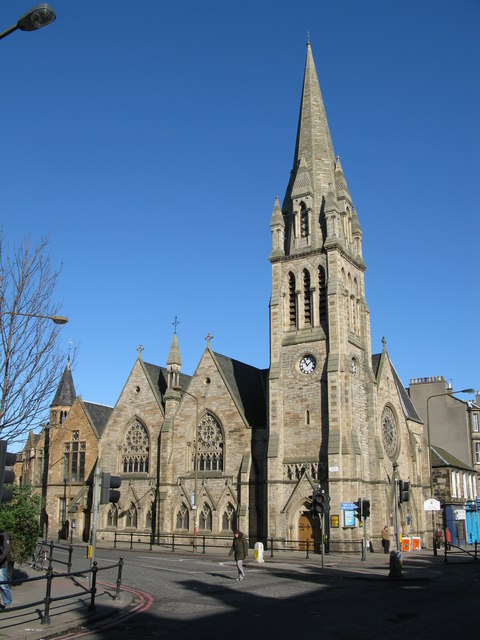
Pilrig Church

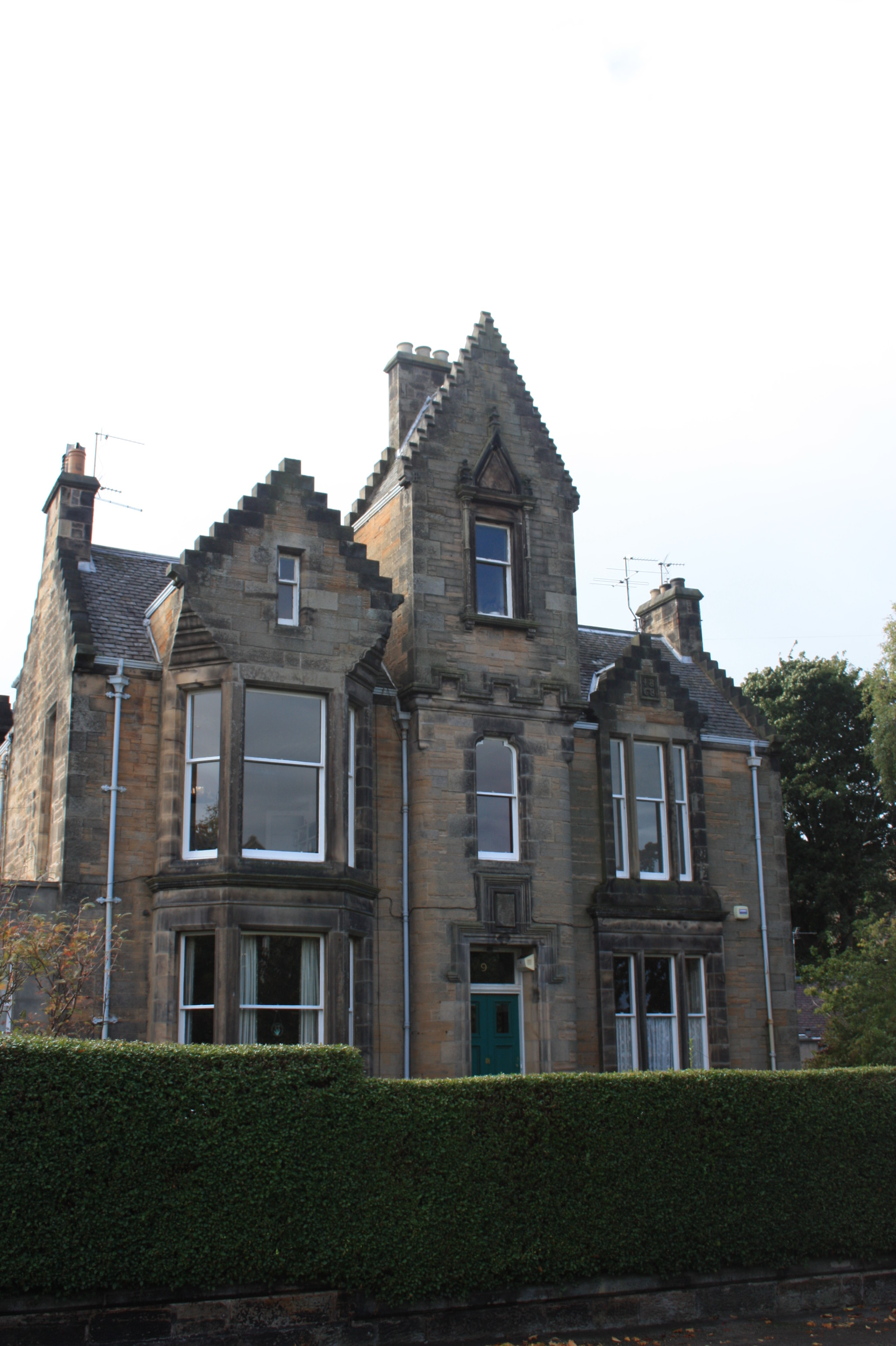
9 Palmerston Road, Edinburgh

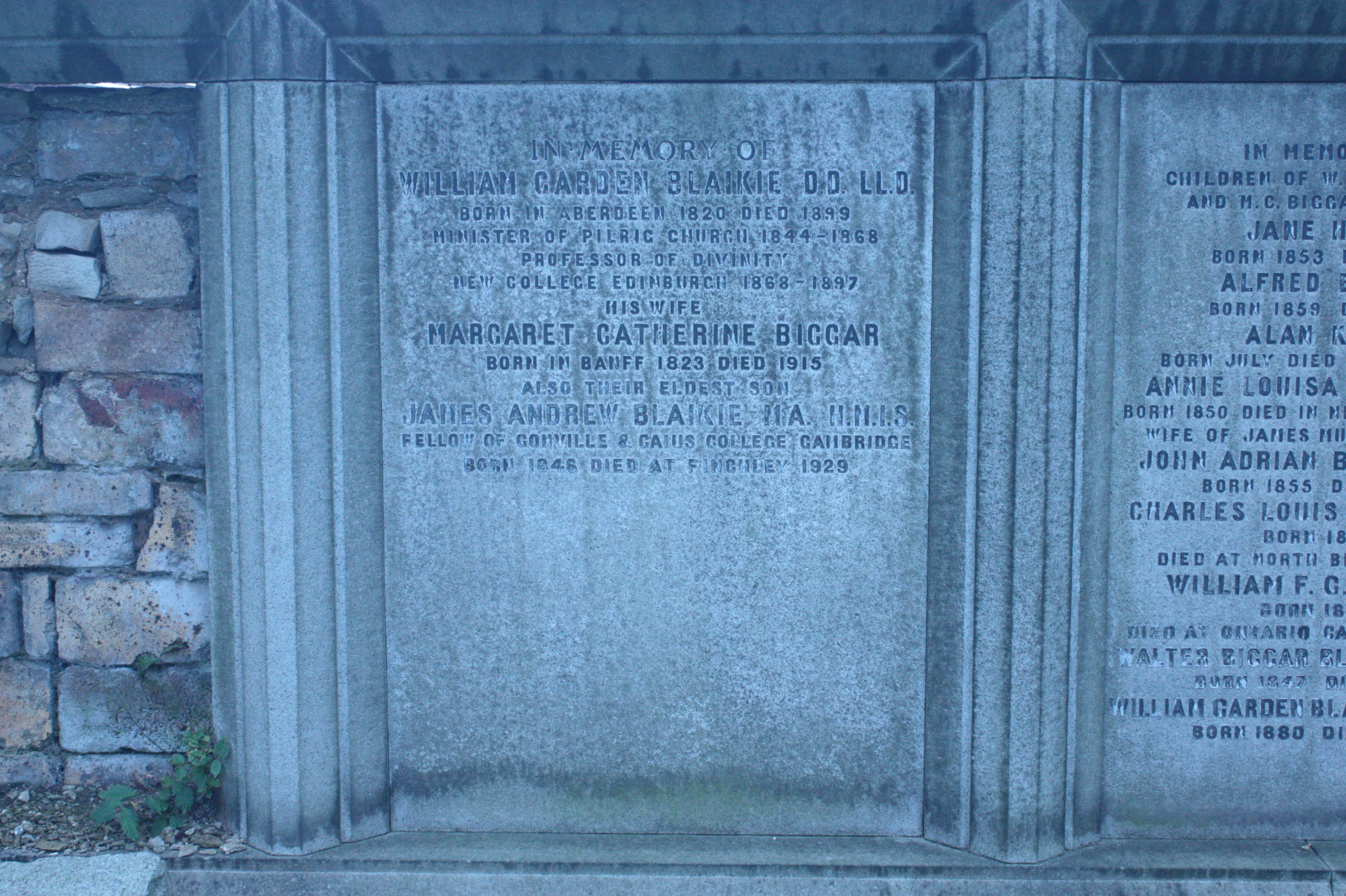
The grave of William Garden Blaikie, Rosebank Cemetery, Edinburgh

William Garden Blaikie FRSE (5 February 1820, in Aberdeen – 11 June 1899) was a Scottish minister, writer, biographer, and temperance reformer.

== Life ==
His father James Ogilvie Blaikie was the first Provost of Aberdeen following its reformed corporation. After studying at Marischal College, where Alexander Bain and David Masson were among his contemporaries, he went in 1839 to Edinburgh to complete his theological studies under Thomas Chalmers. In 1842 he was presented to the parish of Drumblade as their minister by the Earl of Kintore, to whose family he was connected. The Disruption of 1843 reached its climax immediately afterwards, and Blaikie was one of the 474 ministers who signed the deed of demission and gave up their livings.

He found a brief position as Free Church minister of Turriff 1843/44 before being translated to Pilrig Free Church on the boundary between Leith and Edinburgh. This was agreed in January 1844 and his first service was on 1 March 1844. The church was the second purpose-built church for the Free Church and was designed by a congregation member, David Cousin. Elders of the church included Francis Brown Douglas.

Blaikie remained minister of Pilrig until 1868, overseeing the building of a new and more lavish Free Church on the corner opposite the original church, this being designed in 1865 by the architects Peddie & Kinnear, together with a new purpose-built manse on Pilrig Street. Keenly interested in questions of social reform, his first publication was a pamphlet, which was afterwards enlarged into a book called Better Days for Working People. It received public commendation from Lord Brougham, and 60,000 copies were sold. He formed an association for providing better homes for working people, and the Pilrig Model Buildings were erected. He also undertook the editorship of the Free Church Magazine, and then that of the North British Review, which he carried on until 1863. In 1864 he was asked to undertake the Scottish editorship of the Sunday Magazine, and much of his subsequent writing was done for this magazine, especially in the editorial notes.

In 1862, when he was elected a Fellow of the Royal Society of Edinburgh he was living at 9 Palmerston Road, a very large villa in the Grange, Edinburgh.

In 1868, Blaikie was asked to fill the chair of apologetics and pastoral theology at New College, Edinburgh. His position at Pilrig Free Church was filled by Rev James Calder Macphail. Blaikie subsequently was a Professor of Divinity there until 1897. In 1870 he was one of two representatives chosen from the Free Church of Scotland to attend the united general assembly of the Presbyterian churches of the United States. He prolonged his visit, made by a similar tour in Europe, and became the real founder of the Presbyterian Alliance. In 1892 he was elected to the chairmanship of the general assembly, the last of the moderators who had entered the church before the disruption. In 1897 he resigned his professorship.

He died at home, 2 Tantallon Terrace, North Berwick, on 11 June 1899. He is buried in Rosebank Cemetery on Pilrig Street, Edinburgh, against the central north-facing retaining wall.

Blaikie was a temperance reformer, and raised money for the relief of the Waldensian churches. He welcomed Dwight L. Moody to Scotland, and the evangelist made his headquarters with him during his first visit.

== Family ==
He was married to Margaret Catherine Biggar (1823–1915) from Banff. She became the long-standing president (for 29 years) of the Scottish Christian Union (a women's temperance group, independent but associated with the British Women's Temperance Association) and was involved with the Women's Foreign Missionary Society; together the Baikies established an 'emigration home', which from 1871–91, 'rescued' 700 children from the families of 'destitute drunks' and re-homed 300 of these to Canada.

Their own children included Walter Biggar Blaikie, engineer, printer and astronomer, and Robert Henry Blaikie (1857–1933), a surgeon.

== Published works ==
- Saving Knowledge: Addressed to Young Men by Thomas Guthrie and WG Blaikie
- Six Heroic Men: John Frith; T. Fowell Buxton; David Livingstone; Richard Baxter; John Lawrence; Claude Brousson.
- Unser Herr ALS Lehrer Und Seelsorger: Eine Biblische Pastoral Theologie... Autorisierte Ubersetzung
- Champions of the Truth: Short Lives of Christian Leaders in Thought and Action
- Outlines of Bible Geography, Physical and Political
- A Manual of Bible History: In Connection With the General History of the World (Classic Reprint)
- Present Day Tracts on Subjects of Christian Evidence, Doctrine and Morals Vol. 2: William Garden Blaikie, George Rawlinson and R. Radford Thomson
- Historical evidences of the Old Testament
- Bible History, in Connection with the General History of the World Christianity and Secularism Compared in Their Influence and Effects
- The Catholic Presbyterian Volume 2 and 6
- The Personal Life of David Livingstone Chiefly from His Unpublished Journals and Correspondence in the Possession of His Family... by William Garden Blaikie
- Ephesians (The Pulpit commentary)
- Ephesians. Exposition and homiletics by Rev. Professor W. G. Blaikie ... Homilies by various authors, etc. (Pulpit... by William Garden Blaikie, Thomas Croskery and David Thomas (1886)
- The Theology and Theologians of Scotland ... Second edition, etc. Edited by N. L. Walker and W. G. Blaikie by James Walker, William Garden Blaikie and Norman Lockhart Walker (1888)
- Reply to Letter of Professor Blaikie ... to Rev A A Bonar... on statement issued on the Dods and Bruce cases ... Second edition with... by Robert Howie, William Garden Blaikie and Alexander Balmain Bruce (1890)
- Dr. W. G. Blaikie, divine and philanthropist by James Silvester and William Garden Blaikie (1922)
- The right aim and spirit of the Free Church: A sermon by William Garden Blaikie (1866)
- The story of the Bohemian church by William Garden Blaikie (1885)
- The Book of Joshua Volume V.6
- The Sunday Magazine, Volumes 10 & 13
- Heads and hands in the world of labour by W.G. Blaikie 1865
- Memorials of Andrew Crichton, Ed. by W.G. Blaikie
- Better Days for Working People
- On the atomic theory: Prize essay in the chemical class, Marischal College, Aberdeen, session 1836-7 by William Garden Blaikie (1837)
- Six Lectures addressed to the Working Classes on the Improvement of their Temporal Condition ... Third edition... by William Garden Blaikie (1849) *The Head of the House by William Garden Blaikie (1866)
- Counsel and Cheer for the Battle of Life by William Garden Blaikie (1867) *The colleges and theological institutions of America: A lecture delivered by desire of the principal and professors... by William Garden Blaikie (1870) *The religious awakening in Edinburgh,: In connexion with the visit of Messrs. Moody and Sankey by William Garden Blaikie (1874)
- Select Remains of Islay Burns ... Edited by Rev. James C. Burns. With memoir by Rev. W. G. Blaikie by Islay Burns, William Garden Blaikie and James C. Burns (1874)
- Letter to the Right Hon. Lord Polwarth on the Union of Churches in Scotland by William Garden Blaikie (1875)
- The inner life of Christ, (1876) Hodder & Stoughton
- Archbishop Leighton by William Garden Blaikie (1883)
- The Public Ministry of Christ (1883)
- Leaders in Modern Philanthropy, ... with Fifteen Portraits by William Garden Blaikie (1884)
- Ought the Free Church to resume connection with the state? by William Garden Blaikie (1886)
- The Work of the Ministry. A Manual of Homiletic and Pastoral Theology, 1873
- Glimpses of the Inner Life of Christ (2nd edn., publ 1878 by Hodder & Stoughton, 27 Paternoster Row, London)
- The Personal Life of David Livingstone, 1880, 2nd edition 1881, 525 pages
- The Books of Samuel in the Expositor's Bible Series, 2 volumes
- The Book of Joshua in the Expositor's Bible Series 1886
- David, king of Israel: The divine plan and lessons of his life (Limited Classical Reprint Library)
- Life and Reign of David (1880)
- My Body (1883)
- Christianity and the life that now is (Present day tracts on subjects of Christian evidence, doctrine and morals... by William Garden Blaikie (1883)
- The Witness of Palestine to the Bible (Present Day Tracts. no. 10.) by William Garden Blaikie (1883)
- The Vitality of the Bible (Present Day Tracts. no. 23.) by William Garden Blaikie (1884)
- Robert Rollock, first Principal of the University of Edinburgh (New Biographical Series. no. 5.) by William Garden Blaikie and Robert Rollock (1884)
- The adaptation of Bible religion to the needs and nature of man (Present day tracts on subjects of Christian evidence... by William Garden Blaikie (1885)
- The Preachers of Scotland from the Sixth to the Nineteenth Century (publ. 1888 by T. & T. Clark, 38 George Street, Edinburgh
- The family: its scriptural ideal and its modern assailants, (Present day tracts on subjects of Christian evidence... by William Garden Blaikie (1889) *Summer Suns in the Far West; A Holiday Trip to the Pacific Slope (1890)
- The Psalms compared with the hymns of different religions an evidence of inspiration (Present day tracts) by William Garden Blaikie (1892)
- Heroes of Israel (1894)
- Is socialism advancing in England? by William Garden Blaikie (1895)
- Household Prayers for use in Family Worship: with a plan of daily Bible readings by William Garden Blaikie (1898)
- After Fifty Years or Letters of a Grandfather: On Occasion of the Jubilee of the Free Church of Scotland in 1893.
- After Fifty Years, 1893, an account of the Disruption Movement in the form of letters of a grandfather
- Thomas Chalmers, Edinburgh: Oliphant, Anderson and Ferrier, Dec 1896, ("Famous Scots Series")
- Is Christianity True?; Answers from History, the Monuments, the Bible, Nature, Experience, and Growth of Christianity. (1897)
- David Brown, D.D., LL.D.; Professor and Principal of the Free Church College, Aberdeen a Memoir (1898)
- Forty-Nine English Hymns Rendered in Latin Rhyme (1900)
- Recollections of a Busy Life (1901) his autobiography
- Champions of the Truth. Short lives of Christian leaders in thought and action, by W. G. Blaikie, W. M. Colles... by Augustus Robert Buckland and William Garden Blaikie (1903)
- Steps unto heaven: Meditations and prayers on the Psalms by William Garden Blaikie (1909)
