= Sam Hanna (disambiguation) =

Sam Hanna is a character on the American television series, NCIS: Los Angeles.

Sam Hanna may also refer to:

- Sam Hanna Bell, novelist, short story writer, playwright, and broadcaster who lived in Northern Ireland
- Sam Hanna Sr., an inductee in the Louisiana Political Museum and Hall of Fame

== See also ==
- Samuel Hanna, Irish Presbyterian divine
