= Presbytery of Munster =

The Presbytery of Munster was formed in 1840, and joined the Presbyterian Church in Ireland in 1854. Like the Synod of Ulster and the Secession Synod that amalgamated to form the PCI it was a pre-existing Presbyterian church body in Ireland.
