= William Gibson (minister) =

Irish presbyterian divine and minister

William Gibson (1808–1867), Irish presbyterian divine, son of James Gibson, a merchant in Ballymena, Co. Antrim, was born there on 8 May 1808.

== Education ==
He attended school in his native town and in the Belfast Academical Institution, where he took the medal for classics in 1829. His collegiate training was obtained partly in Belfast and partly in Edinburgh.

== Presbyterian minister ==
In 1833 he was licensed, and in 1834 ordained minister of First Ballybay, Co. Monaghan. In 1835 a pamphlet which he wrote on ‘The Position of the Church of Ireland and the Duty of Presbyterians in reference to it’ had a wide circulation. In 1840 he became colleague to the Rev. Samuel Hanna, D.D., in Rosemary Street Church, Belfast. In 1842 he was the chief means of establishing the ‘Banner of Ulster,’ a newspaper devoted principally to the interests of Irish presbyterianism. In 1847 he was appointed the General Assembly's Professor of Christian Ethics. In 1859 he became Moderator of the General Assembly.

== Death and works ==
He died suddenly in June 1867. His chief work was ‘The Year of Grace, a History of the Ulster Revival of 1859’, Edinburgh, 1860.

== Notes ==
Academic offices
New title	Professor of Christian Ethics of the Presbyterian Church in Ireland; 1847-1867	Succeeded by Henry Wallace
Presbyterian Church titles
Preceded by John Johnston (1858)	Moderator of the Presbyterian Church in Ireland; 1859	Succeeded by Samuel Marcus Dill (1860)
