= Robert Watts (minister) =

Minister of the Presbyterian Church in Ireland and theological writer

Robert Watts, (1820–1895), Irish presbyterian minister, the youngest of fourteen children of a presbyterian farmer, was born at Moneylane, near Castlewellan, County Down, on 10 July 1820. He was educated at the parish school of Kilmegan, Co. Down, and at the Royal Belfast Academical Institution.

== Life in the United States ==
In 1848 he went to America, graduated (1849) at Washington College, Lexington, Virginia, and studied theology at Princeton, New Jersey, under Charles Hodge, D.D. (1797–1878). He organised (1852) a presbyterian mission at Philadelphia, gathered a congregation in Franklin House Hall, was ordained its pastor in 1853, and obtained the erection (1856) of Westminster Church for its use. He got into controversy on Arminianism with Albert Barnes (1798–1870), a Philadelphia presbyterian of liberal views.

== Ministry in Ireland ==
On a visit to Ireland he accepted a call to Lower Gloucester Street congregation, Dublin, and was installed there in August 1863. On the death (1866) of John Edgar, Watts was elected to the chair of systematic theology in the Assembly's College, Belfast. He was a keen theologian, of very conservative views, opposed to the tendency of much modern criticism, and especially to the influence of German exegesis. He studied current speculations with some care, in a spirit of uncompromising antagonism. His writings were acceptable to the older minds in his denomination, and were in some measure successful in arresting tendencies which he combated with confident vivacity. In matters where he considered that no theological interest was involved he was not so conservative; he advocated the use of instrumental music in public worship, though this was against the general sentiment of Irish presbyterians. He was Moderator of the General Assembly from 1879 to 1880. His health suffered from overwork, and after the close of the college session, April 1895, he completely broke down. He died at College Park, Belfast, on 26 July 1895, and was buried on 29 July in the city cemetery.

== Family ==
He married (1853) Margaret, daughter of William Newell of Summerhill, Downpatrick, who survived him with two sons and a daughter. His eldest son, Robert Watts, presbyterian minister of Kilmacreenan, co. Donegal, died on 4 Dec. 1889. The first chapter of the biography of his daughter Mary (written by her husband Robert Barron after her death in 1914) describes Robert Watts life and career in detail.

== Works ==
Among his numerous publications may be named:

- 1. The Doctrine of Eternal Punishment Vindicated, Belfast, 1873.
- 2. Reply to Professor Tyndal's Address before the British Association, Belfast, 1874.
- 3. An Examination of Herbert Spencer's Biological Hypothesis, Belfast, 1875.
- 4. The New Apologetic, Edinburgh, 1879.
- 5. The Newer Criticism and the Analogy of the Faith. A Reply to Lectures by W. Robertson Smith, M.A., on the Old Testament in the Jewish Church, Edinburgh, 1881.
- 6. The Rule of Faith and the Doctrine of Inspiration, 1885, 8vo.
- 7. The Sovereignty of God Louisville, Kentucky, 1894.

He contributed many articles to presbyterian and other periodicals.

== Sources ==
- 1. Northern Whig, 27 July 1895
- 2. Belfast Newsletter, 27 July 1895
- 3. W. T. Latimer, A history of the Irish Presbyterians, 2nd edn (1902), 510, 516
- 4. Schaff and Jackson's Encyclopædia of Living Divines, 1891, p. 231.
- 5. This article incorporates text from a publication now in the public domain: Gordon, Alexander (1899). "Watts, Robert". In Lee, Sidney (ed.). Dictionary of National Biography. Vol. 60. London: Smith, Elder & Co. p. 73.

Academic offices
Preceded by John Edgar	Professor of Theology of the Presbyterian Church in Ireland; 1866-1895	Succeeded by Thomas Macafee Hamill
Presbyterian Church titles
Preceded by Thomas Witherow (1878)	Moderator of the Presbyterian Church in Ireland; 1879	Succeeded by Jackson Smyth (1880)
