= William Hanna (minister) =

Free Church of Scotland minister and writer; (1808–1882)

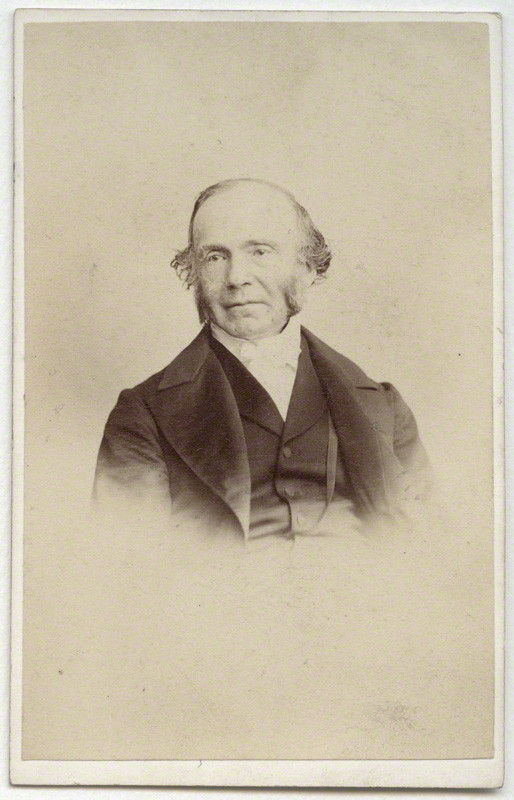
Rev William Hanna

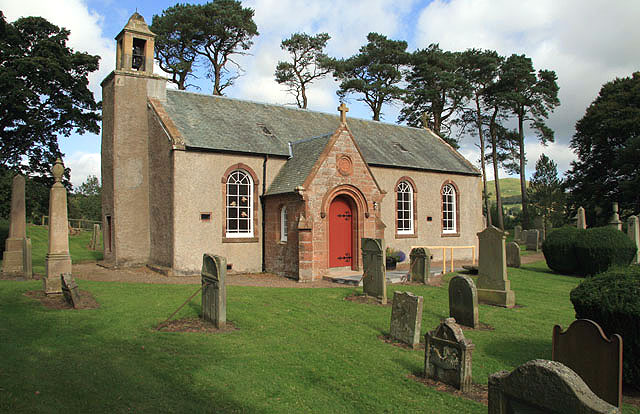
Skirling Parish Church

William Hanna (26 November 1808 – 24 May 1882) was a Scottish minister, known as a theological writer and as the biographer of his father-in-law, Thomas Chalmers.

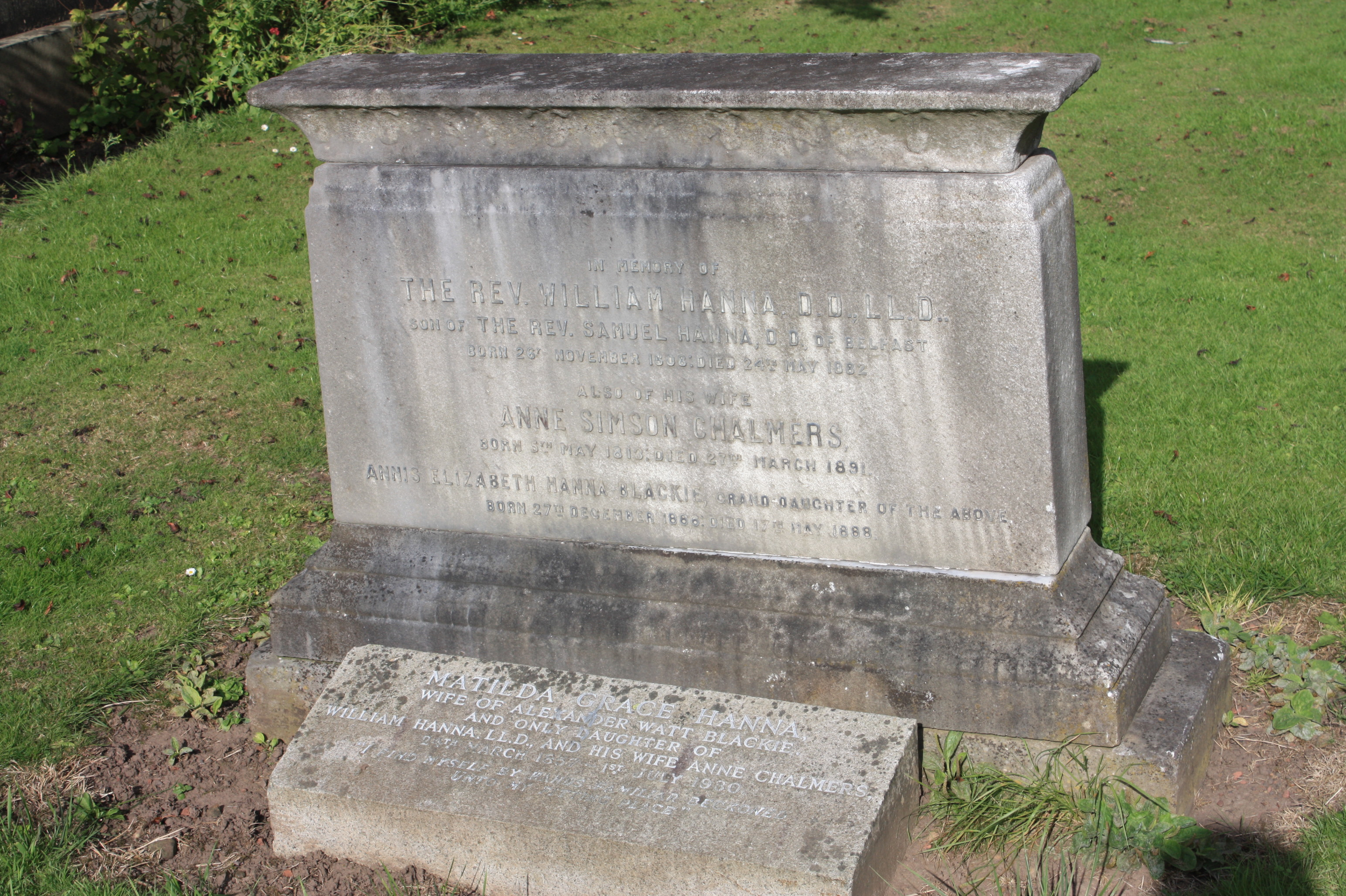
The grave of Rev William Hanna, Grange Cemetery, Edinburgh

== Life ==
Born in Belfast on 26 November 1808, he was the son of Rev Prof Samuel Hanna, a minister of the Presbyterian Church of Ireland. He studied at the University of Glasgow, going on to the University of Edinburgh where he studied under Thomas Chalmers.

In 1834 Hanna was licensed to preach the Church of Scotland. He was ordained at East Kilbride, a parish near Glasgow, on 17 September 1835. In 1837 he was translated to the parish of Skirling in Peebles-shire, near Biggar. During the ten-year controversy that preceded the Disruption of 1843, he took an active part on the side of Chalmers and his allies. He left the established Church of Scotland in 1843, joining the Free Church of Scotland, taking most of his congregation with him.

Having resigned his charge at Skirling in 1848, Hanna removed permanently to Edinburgh, where in 1850 he was called to be assistant to Thomas Guthrie, as minister of St. John's Free Church on Johnstone Terrace near Edinburgh Castle. In 1852 he received an honorary doctorate of LL.D. from the University of Glasgow and in 1864 an honorary doctorate D.D. from the University of Edinburgh. In 1855 he was living at 4 Castle Terrace facing Edinburgh Castle.

During his time in Edinburgh he founded the Mission Church at the Pleasance.

In 1866 he retired from the active duties of the ministry, being replaced by Rev George Philip.

He died in London, 24 May 1882. He is buried in the Grange Cemetery in south Edinburgh in the plot of his father-in-law, Thomas Chalmers (against the north wall).

== Works ==
On the death of Thomas Chalmers in 1847, Hanna was asked to write his biography, and arranged a temporary exchange so he could reside for a time in Edinburgh. The Life of Chalmers came out in four volumes (1849–52), to which was added a fifth, containing extracts of Correspondence. Hanna also edited the Posthumous Works of Dr. Chalmers, in nine volumes. In 1847 he was appointed editor of the North British Review, but did not hold the post long.

Hanna published (among other books):

- Wycliffe and the Huguenots, 1860 (originally two series of lectures at the Philosophical Institution, Edinburgh).
- Martyrs of the Scottish Reformation.
- Last Day of our Lord's Passion, 1862 (this volume reached a circulation of fifty thousand).
- The Forty Days after the Resurrection, 1863.
- The Earlier Years of our Lord, 1864.
- The Passion Week, 1866.
- Our Lord's Ministry in Galilee, 1868.
- The Close of our Lord's Ministry, 1869.
- The Resurrection of the Dead, 1872.

Hanna edited in 1858 a volume of Essays by Ministers of the Free Church of Scotland, Charles Hodge's Idea of the Church in 1860, and in 1877 the Letters of Thomas Erskine of Linlathen. He circulated privately a memoir of Alexander Keith Johnston.

Hanna was also a contributor to the Sunday Magazine, Good Words, The Quiver and other periodicals.

== Family ==
While at East Kirkbride, Hanna married Anne Simson Chalmers (1813–1891), eldest daughter of Thomas Chalmers.

They had a daughter, Matilda Grace Hanna (d. 1930), who married Alexander Watt Blackie.

Their son, Thomas Chalmers Hanna (1837–1910), was a chartered accountant.

== Notes ==
Attribution

- This article incorporates text from a publication now in the public domain: Stephen, Leslie; Lee, Sidney, eds. (1890). "Hanna, William". Dictionary of National Biography. Vol. 24. London: Smith, Elder & Co.
