= William Batt (architect) =

Irish architect

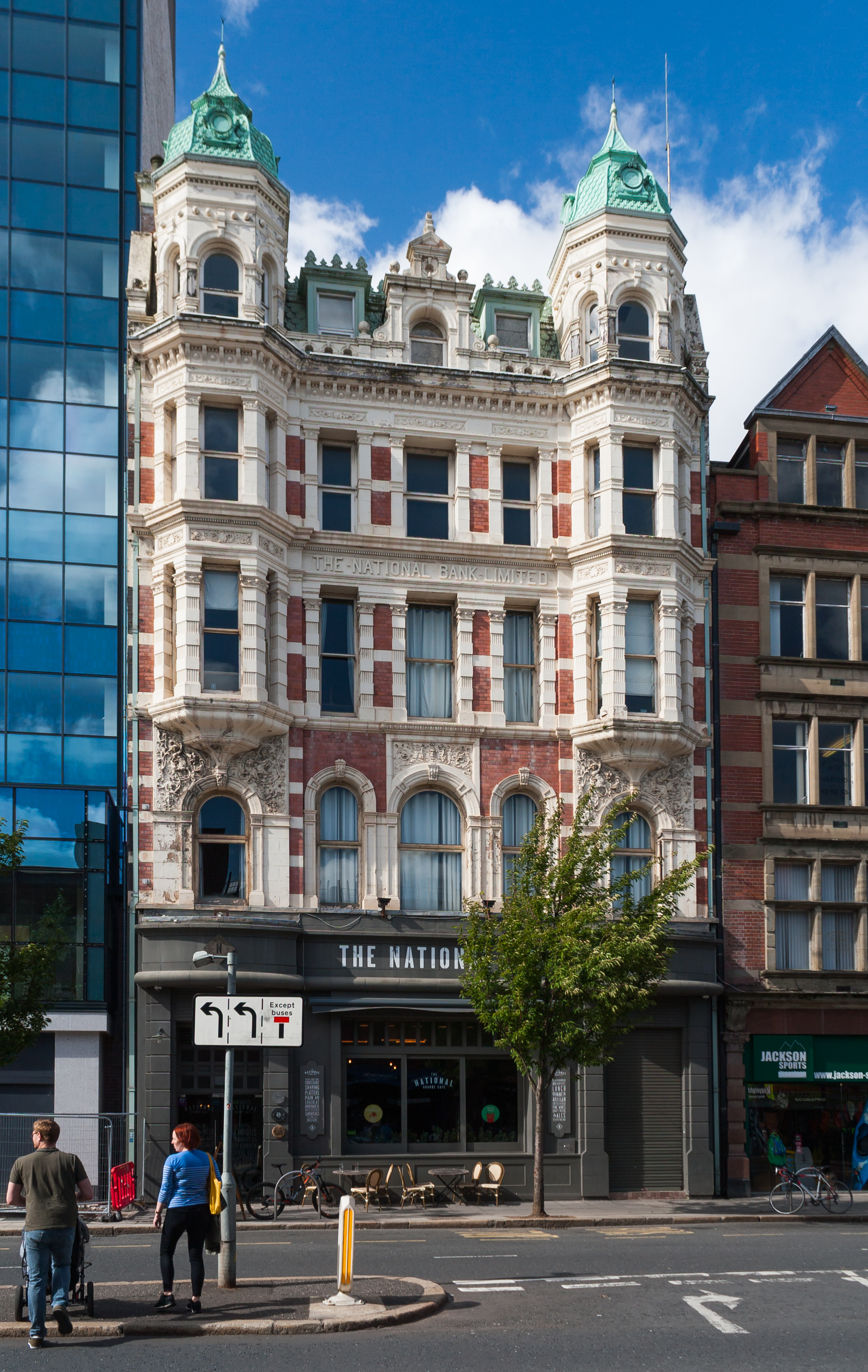
The former office of the National Bank in High Street, Belfast, designed by William Batt and completed in 1897, is considered to be the peak of High Victorian architecture in Belfast.

William Batt (1840–1910) was a Belfast-based architect. He joined the firm of Boyd and Batt, led by George Boyd and another William Batt who is assumed to be his father. In contemporary publications he was referred to as William Batt junior.

Batt worked in the High Victorian architectural style throughout his entire career. He began with numerous villas in the Malone Road. In 1876–79 he designed the front gate lodge for the Botanic Gardens in Belfast which was demolished in 1965. Among his works are many Orange halls including Belfast Orange Hall at 82 Clifton Street. He became a member of the Royal Institute of the Architects of Ireland in 1878.

He died in 1910, and is buried in Balmoral Cemetery in Belfast.
