= Temperance movement in Ireland =

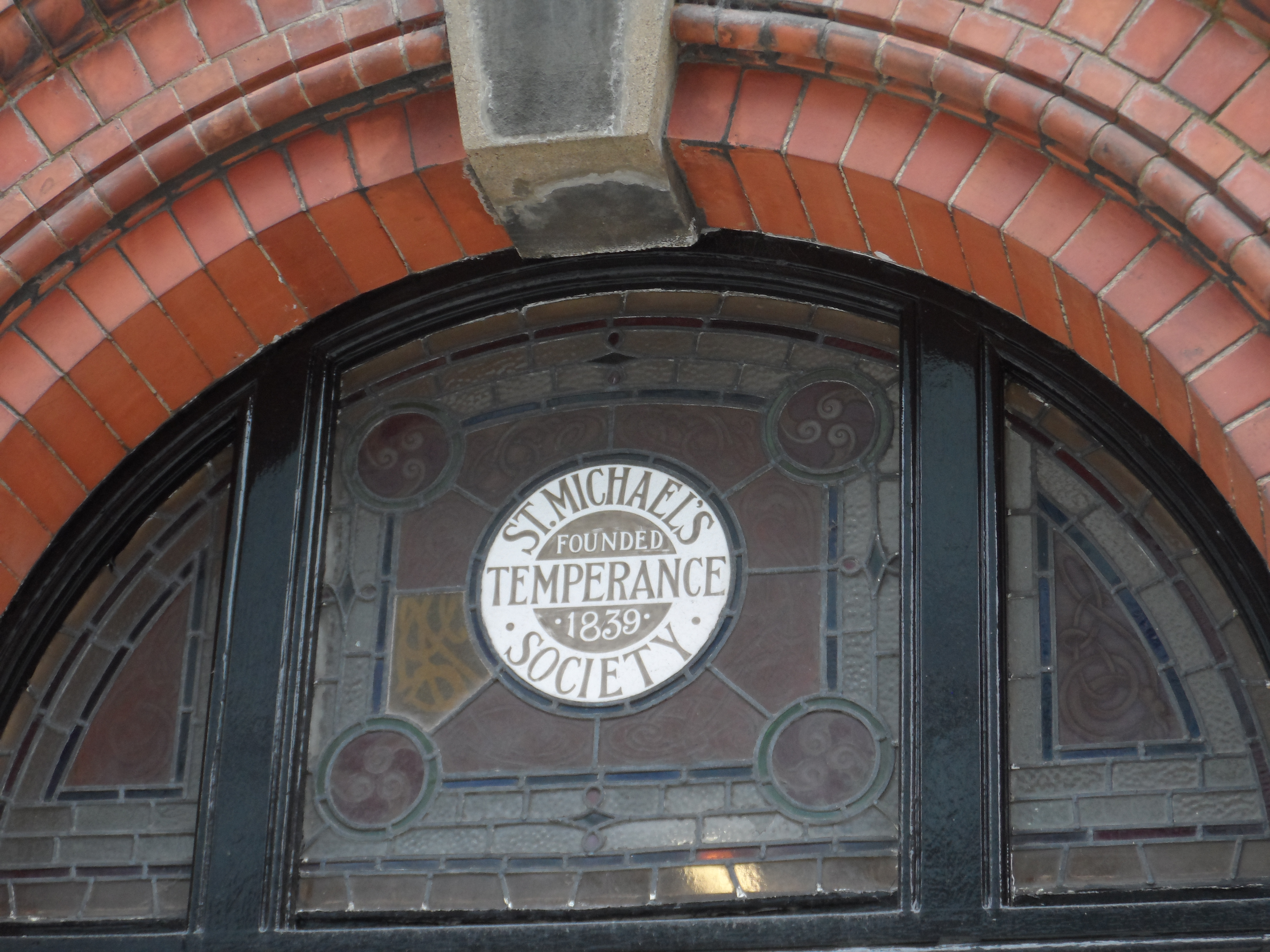
Glasswork above the door of St Michael's Temperance Society Hall, Lower Cecil Street, Limerick, founded 1839.

The Temperance movement in Ireland was an influential movement dedicated to lowering consumption of alcohol that involved both Protestant and Catholic religious leaders.

In Ireland, Catholic priest, Theobald Mathew persuaded thousands of people to sign the pledge, therefore, establishing the Teetotal Abstinence Society in 1838.

Many years later, in 1898, James Cullen founded the Pioneer Total Abstinence Association in response of the fading influence of the original temperance pledge.

In 1829, the Presbyterian minister Rev. John Edgar initiated a temperance movement, by pouring his stock of whiskey out his window. Also, many Orange lodges are "temperance lodges" and abstain from drinking. These particular lodges are more common in rural areas where the religious ethos of the organisation is more to the fore.

In 1864 Sir Thomas Russell Bt became secretary and parliamentary agent of the Irish temperance movement, and became well known as a speaker for that cause; it was largely due to his energy that the Sale of Liquors on Sunday (Ireland) Act 1878 was passed.
