= Thomas Croskery =

Thomas Croskery D.D. (1830–1886) was an Irish theologian and reviewer.

== Early life ==
The son of a tradesman from County Down, Ireland, he was born in the village of Carrowdore, nearly midway between Donaghadee and Greyabbey, on 26 May 1830. Most of his boyhood was spent in Downpatrick, to which the family moved during his childhood. His parents were poor, but gave him a good school training, and in November 1845 he was entered at the old college in Belfast, with a view to becoming a minister of the unitarian body, with which his father was connected. His religious views soon changed, and he determined to enter the ministry of the Presbyterian Church in Ireland. His father's poverty forcing him to support himself by his own exertions, he learned shorthand and became a reporter in connection with the Belfast press. He thus got through the six years of his college course, and on 6 May 1851 was licensed to preach by the presbytery of Down. Shortly after he went to America, where he remained for two years preaching. Returning to Belfast, he resumed his connection with the press, becoming first a reporter and subsequently editor of the ‘Banner of Ulster.’ He also officiated on Sundays, but used laughingly to tell that he preached in twenty-six vacant churches before he received a ‘call.’

== Parish ministry ==
At length he was invited to undertake the charge of the congregation of Creggan, County Armagh, and on 17 July 1860 was ordained. He was translated to Clonakilty, County Cork, and installed on 24 March 1863. In 1866 he received a call to the newly formed congregation of Waterside in the city of Derry, and was installed there on 20 March in that year. In all three charges he was greatly beloved and respected.

== Magee College ==
In 1875 he was appointed by the General Assembly to the professorship of logic and belles-lettres in Magee College, Derry, and in 1879, on the death of Professor Richard Smyth, D.D., M.P., he was transferred at his own request to the chair of theology, an office which he held till his death on 3 October. 1886. In 1883 he received the honorary degree of D.D. from the Presbyterian Theological Faculty, Ireland. His grave is in Derry cemetery.

== Literary works ==
Croskery's literary life began early with contributions to newspapers. His first work of importance was ‘A Catechism on the Doctrines of the Plymouth Brethren,’ which ran through several editions. In 1879 he published a larger work of conspicuous ability, entitled ‘Plymouth Brethrenism: a Refutation of its Principles and Doctrines.’ In 1884 appeared his ‘Irish Presbyterianism: its History, Character, Influence, and Present Position.’ He had charge of the homiletical portion of the ‘Pulpit Commentary on Galatians,’ which appeared in 1885. But his main strength as an author was given to periodical literature. He was a contributor of articles on varied topics to the Edinburgh Review, the British Quarterly Review, Fraser's Magazine, the London Quarterly, the British and Foreign Evangelical Review, and the Princeton Review, of leaders to such Irish newspapers as the Witness and the Northern Whig, and of papers to several denominational periodicals.

== Assessment ==
Five review and magazine articles sometimes appeared in the same month while he was lecturing daily.

== Sources ==
- Minutes of the General Assembly of the Presbyterian Church in Ireland
- Obituary notices
- Personal knowledge of Thomas Hamilton

Academic offices
Preceded by J. Thoburn McGaw	Professor of Logic, Belles Lettres and Rhetoric at Magee College, Derry, County Londonderry; 1875-79	Succeeded by James Dougherty (as Professor of Logic and English
Preceded by Richard Smyth	Professor of Theology at Magee College, Derry, County Londonderry; 1879-86	Succeeded by Francis Petticrew

=== Attribution ===
This article incorporates text from a publication now in the public domain: Stephen, Leslie, ed. (1888). "Croskery, Thomas". Dictionary of National Biography. Vol. 13. London: Smith, Elder & Co.
