= North British Review =

The North British Review was a Scottish periodical. It was founded in 1844 to act as the organ of the new Free Church of Scotland, the first editor being David Welsh. It was published until 1871; in the last few years of its existence it had a liberal Catholic editorial policy.

Under Lord Acton's influence the Review took on a different character, with Aurelio Buddeus and Constantin Frantz writing on European affairs. Its editorial line rose above nationalistic politics, and was strongly opposed to Otto von Bismarck.

Darwin, who cites it abundantly, says of it: "it has been of more use to me than any other Review".

== Editors ==
- 1845–6 Edward Francis Maitland
- 1847 William Hanna
- 1850–7 Alexander Campbell Fraser
- 1857 John Duns
- 1860–3 William Garden Blaikie
- c.1864 David Douglas; publisher in 1868–9.
- 1869 Thomas Frederick Wetherell, for a group around Lord Acton.
