= Synod of Ulster =

The (General) Synod of Ulster was the forerunner of the General Assembly of the Presbyterian Church in Ireland. It comprised all the clergy of the church elected by their respective local presbyteries (or church elders) and a section of the laity. Official records of its proceedings exist from 1691.

The first presbytery in Ulster was founded in Carrickfergus in 1642.

In 1726, the Synod expelled ministers, grouped together as the Presbytery of Antrim, who refused to subscribe to the Westminster Confession of Faith. Later there was a further secession by those who, insisting on the sole kingship of Christ, rejected the Confession. In 1763 they organised a distinct Reformed Presbyterian Church, and in 1811 established their own provincial synod. In 1746, some of the more doctrinaire Calvinists withdrew, forming the Secession Synod.

Within the mainline Synod there was a continuing distinction between 'Old Light' supporters of theological orthodoxy and 'New Light' elements more inclined to defer to conscience rather than doctrine. In the first decades of the 19th century, positions hardened with New Light ministers adopting a Unitarian or Arian scepticism regarding the doctrine of the Trinity. In 1829, when the leading conservative evangelical, Henry Cooke, succeeded in pressing the General Synod for a firm declaration of Trinitarian belief they withdrew to form their own Remonstrant Synod.

The departure of the latitudinarian party made possible a reconciliation with the earlier Seceders. Purged of its heterodox elements, in 1840 the Synod of Ulster joined with the Secession Synod to form the General Assembly of the Presbyterian Church in Ireland.
