= Balmoral Cemetery, Belfast =

Cemetery in Northern Ireland

Coordinates: 54.5695°N 5.9675°W

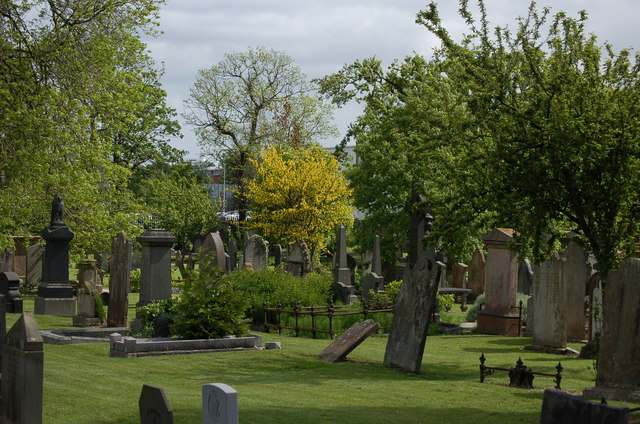
Balmoral Cemetery

Balmoral Cemetery is a cemetery in the Malone area of South Belfast, Northern Ireland, opened in 1855.

== History ==
The cemetery was opened in 1855 by Presbyterian churchmen Rev. Henry Cooke and Rev. Joseph Mackenzie, on land owned by Mackenzie, after they had been refused burial by a Church of Ireland rector in another cemetery. It was controlled by a board of trustees which included three Presbyterian ministers. While most of the burials were for Presbyterians, other denominations were buried there.

Three Commonwealth soldiers (one each of British, Australian, and Canadian armies) of World War I are buried in the cemetery, their graves maintained by the Commonwealth War Graves Commission.

In 1953, the cemetery was taken over by Belfast Corporation. It is no longer open for burials, but is open to visitors.

== Notable burials ==
- Dr Wilberforce Arnold (1838–1891), founder of the Presbyterian Orphan Society
- William Batt (1840–1910), architect
- Reverend Henry Cooke (1788–1868), Presbyterian minister and co-founder of the cemetery
- Prof. John Creery Ferguson (1802–1865), physician and fetologist, Professor of Medicine, Queen's College, Belfast
- Josias Leslie Porter (1823–1889), Presbyterian minister, missionary and traveller
- Hugh Hanna (1821–1892), evangelical and anti-Catholic preacher
- Reverend Joseph Mackenzie (1811–1883), Presbyterian minister and co-founder of the cemetery
- Colonel Hampden Clement Blamire Moody (1821–1869), Commander of the Royal Engineers in China and Belfast
- Isabella Tod (1836–1896), Scottish suffragist and unionist politician
