= General Assembly of the Presbyterian Church in Ireland =

Sovereign and highest court of the Presbyterian Church in Ireland

Stamp of the General Assembly with the words "Ardens Sed Virens" ("Burning but flourishing")

The General Assembly of the Presbyterian Church in Ireland is the sovereign and highest court of the Presbyterian Church in Ireland, and is thus the Church's governing body. The General Assembly normally meets annually, during the first full week in June.

In common with other presbyterian churches, the Presbyterian Church in Ireland is governed by courts of elders. That is to say, it is governed by presbyterian polity. At the bottom of the hierarchy of courts is the Kirk Session, the court of the individual local churches; representatives of several Kirk Sessions form the Presbytery, the local area court. As in many other presbyterian churches the Synod, or regional level, is now left out. A Synod had authority over a group of presbyteries. At the level of the island of Ireland, the General Assembly stands at the top of this structure.

Every minister is a member, and every congregation sends one lay elder. Women's and youth organisations, deaconesses and sister churches are also entitled to send delegates, giving a total membership of around 1,300.

The sitting Assembly first installs a new Moderator of the Presbyterian Church in Ireland, who acts as a presiding officer for the rest of the session. After the Assembly rises at the end of the week, the Moderator spends much of the rest of the year as its ambassador.

== Moderators and Location ==
General Assembly Mods and Location
Year	Number	Moderator	Congregation	GA Location
1840	1st	Rev Samuel Hanna	Belfast, Rosemary Street	?
1841	2nd	Henry Cooke	Belfast, May Street	?

== See also ==
- General Assembly of the Church of Scotland
