= Secession Synod =

The Secession Synod was the Presbyterian Synod of Ireland from 1743 to 1840.

== History ==
The Secession movement began in the 1733, when some Protestant preachers in Scotland observed what they saw as loosening in the orthodoxy of the Presbyterian Church and a movement towards liberal modernism. Ebenezer Erskine was dismissed from his Scottish congregation after declaring that the Scottish church needed to be reformed; he and several others started their ‘Associate Presbytery’ and became known as Seceders.

Seceder congregations spread throughout Scotland and Ulster. There was a split amongst the Seceders in Scotland over an oath (leading to the Burghers and anti-Burghers), but this was mended in 1818.

== Creation of the Presbyterian Church in Ireland ==
In the 1830s, students of both the Secession Synod and the Synod of Ulster attended the Belfast Academical Institution where a United Prayer Meeting was established. In 1839 the students petitioned both Synods to unite and they agreed to set up a committee to deal with the issue; the committee produced twelve resolutions which were presented on 8 April 1840 and with concessions from both sides these were eventually accepted.

The Presbyterian Church in Ireland was created in 1840 with the merger of the Secession Synod and the Synod of Ulster. The ceremony was attended by 500 ministers and elders, including a visiting Robert Murray McCheyne.

Some Seceder congregations refused to join the body, but in time most joined or became members of the Reformed Presbyterian Church.
