= Stafford Carson =

Northern Irish theologian and academic

Personal life
- Born: 29 May 1951 (age 75)

Religious life
- Church: Presbyterian Church in Ireland

John Stafford Carson (born 29 May 1951) is a former Principal and Professor of Ministry at Union Theological College, Belfast, and a former moderator of the Presbyterian Church in Ireland. He took office as moderator on 1 June 2009 in succession to Dr Donald Patton. As moderator, he was awarded an honorary Doctor of Divinity degree by the Presbyterian Theological Faculty, Ireland.

In June 2013, he was appointed executive principal of Union Theological College but retired in December 2020.

As well as working in theological education in his home land of Northern Ireland he worked as the Vice-President and Academic Dean of Westminster Theological Seminary 2000–2005 and returned there to work as Senior Director of Global Ministries in 2022.

He was the public face of the Presbyterian Church in Ireland as the church responded to the 2008 collapse of the Presbyterian Mutual Society and heavily involved in discussions with the government about how to respond to the crisis and develop a rescue package for savers.

In 2018 the Presbyterian Church in Ireland affirmed that the sacraments cannot be administered to people who cannot make a credible profession of faith, including people in same-sex relationships. This provoked controversy in the media. As Convener of the Doctrine Committee which brought the report on the matter to the General Assembly of the church, he featured prominently in media coverage of the decision and was highlighted as an influential figure in changing attitudes in the Church by public figures such as Naomi Long, at the time a member of the Presbyterian church and leader of the Alliance Party.

Presbyterian Church titles
Preceded by Donald Patton (2008)	Moderator of the Presbyterian Church in Ireland; 2009	Succeeded by Norman Hamilton
