= Norman Hamilton (minister) =

British minister (born 1946)

The Reverend Norman Hamilton OBE
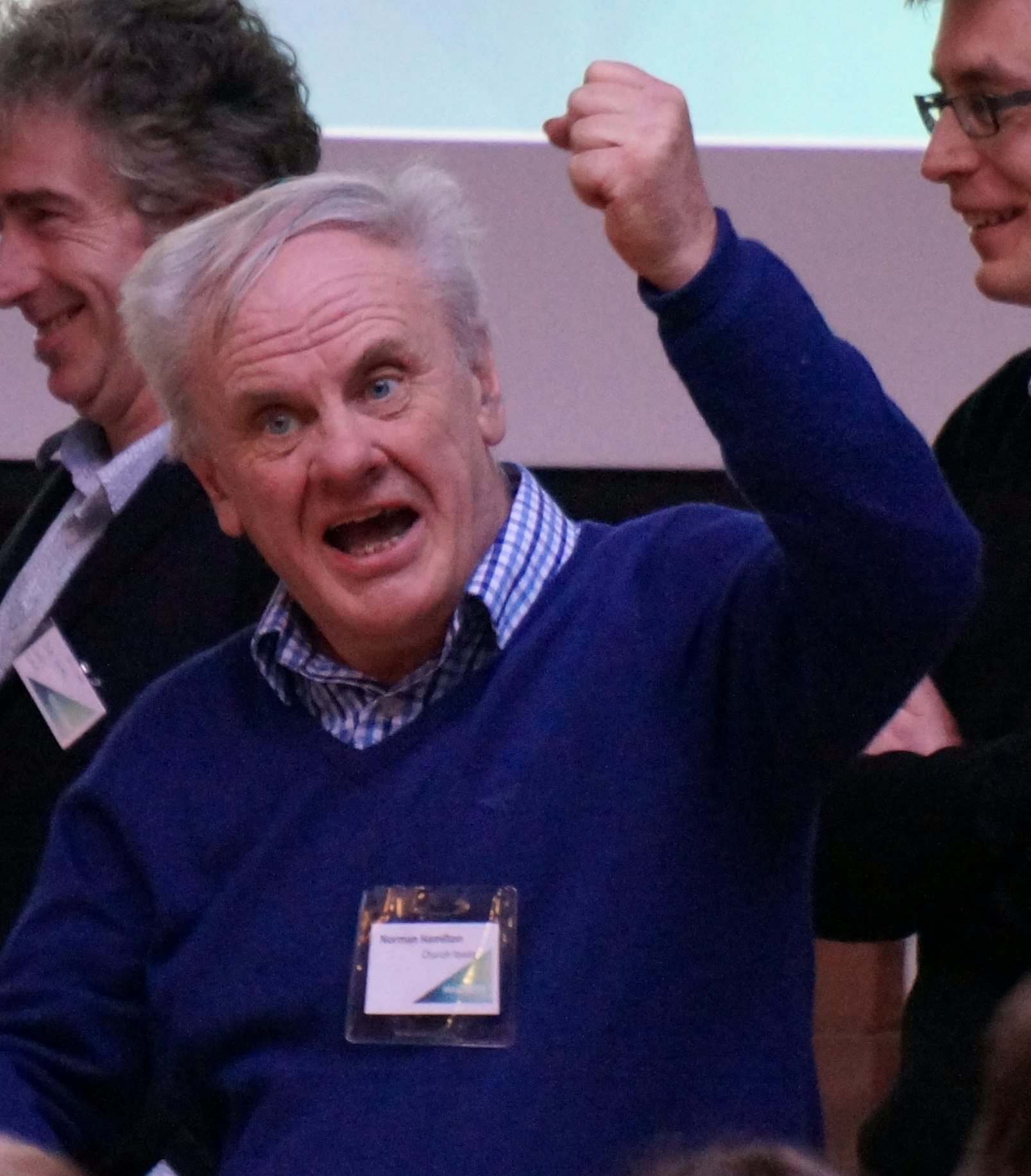
- Hamilton in 2014

Moderator of the Presbyterian Church in Ireland
- In office June 2010 – June 2011
- Preceded by: Thomas Stafford Carson
- Succeeded by: Ivan James Patterson

Personal life
- Born: 6 October 1946 (age 79) Magheralin, County Down, Northern Ireland
- Education: Trinity College Dublin; Union Theological College
- Occupation: Minister (formerly)

Religious life
- Religion: Presbyterian
- Denomination: Presbyterian Church in Ireland
- Church: Ballysillan Presbyterian Church

Norman Hamilton, OBE (born 6 October 1946) was Moderator of the Presbyterian Church in Ireland from June 2010 - June 2011.

== Early life ==
Hamilton was born in Magheralin, County Down. He went to primary school in Magheralin and Lurgan, before then attending the Portadown College grammar school. He met his wife, Evelyn, while studying Economics at Trinity College Dublin.

== Career ==
After graduation he worked as a civil servant for some time before moving to England for a staff position at the Universities and Colleges Christian Fellowship. After four years, he returned to study Theology at the Union Theological College in Belfast.

Following graduation, he was an assistant minister at the Lowe Memorial Presbyterian Church for six years before he became a minister at Ballysillan Presbyterian in north Belfast. Hamilton served as a minister at the Ballysillan church for twenty-six years until retiring in 2014.

In 2001, Hamilton played a key role in bringing the Holy Cross dispute to an end.

In February 2010, Hamilton tied with Newtownards-based Norman McAuley in an election to elect a new moderator for the Presbyterian Church in Ireland. Following another election in March, Hamilton succeeded Stafford Carson as Moderator after securing the votes of 11 of 19 presbyteries. He served as moderator for a year before Ivan Patterson succeeded him in June 2011.

In 2021, Hamilton joined the SDLP's 'New Ireland Commission'.

== Awards ==
Hamilton was made an Officer of the Order of the British Empire (OBE) by Queen Elizabeth II during the 2007 New Year Honours for his services to community relations in Northern Ireland.

Presbyterian Church titles
Preceded by Stafford Carson (2009)	Moderator of the Presbyterian Church in Ireland; 2010	Succeeded by Ivan Patterson (2011)
