= Spending Review =

Governmental process in the United Kingdom carried out by HM Treasury

A spending review, or occasionally a comprehensive spending review or spending round, is a governmental process in the United Kingdom carried out by HM Treasury to set firm expenditure limits and, through public service agreements, define the key improvements that the public can expect from these resources.

Spending reviews typically focus upon one or several aspects of public spending while comprehensive spending reviews focus upon each government department's spending requirements from a zero base (i.e. without reference to past plans or, initially, current expenditure). The latter are named after the year in which they are announced – thus CSR07 (completed in October 2007) applies to financial years 2008–2011. Spending rounds normally cover a single year.

Other developed countries have similar review processes, e.g. Canada, New Zealand, the Netherlands, Italy, Ireland, and France. France conducted its first comprehensive spending review (called in French "la Révision Générale des Politiques Publiques") in 2008. The Netherlands has been carrying out spending reviews since 1981.

As a consequence of the COVID-19 pandemic, the 2020 review covered just a one-year period in contrast to previous years. The 2021 spending review was subsumed into the October 2021 budget.

== History ==
=== 1998 Comprehensive Spending Review ===
The 1998 Comprehensive Spending Review (CSR98) was the first set of multi-year spending plans delivered by the Chancellor of the Exchequer Gordon Brown, allocating spending from 1999–2000 to 2001–2002.

=== 2000 Spending Review ===
The 2000 Spending Review (SR2000) set spending plans from 2001–2002 to 2003–2004.

=== 2002 Spending Review ===
The 2002 Spending Review (SR02) set a target for expanding the role of voluntary sector organisations in the provision of public services, anticipating growth by 5% in the period to 2005–2006.

=== 2004 Spending Review ===
The 2004 Spending Review (SR04) set spending plans for government departments up to 2007–2008.

=== 2007 Comprehensive Spending Review ===
The 2007 Comprehensive Spending Review (CSR07) announced by Chancellor Alistair Darling included three significant changes. The first was that it represented the first test of the capacity of the Spending Review process to plan and deliver a discretionary fiscal consolidation in the UK. The previous four Spending Reviews had taken place during periods of steady public growth in the economy from 37% in 1999–00 to 42% by 2007–08. As both the UK's then fiscal rules (the "Golden Rule" and the sustainable investment rule) began to bite, the UK government desired to halve the real rate of growth in public spending from 4% per annum over the last decade to 2% per annum over the next three years – a 0.5% below than the trend rate of growth of the economy. A second noteworthy development in the 2007 CSR was a marked extension in the certainty that the UK system provided to public sector managers about their future budgets. Finally, CSR07 saw the UK's public service 110 largely departmental-based Public Service Agreements consolidated into 30 inter-departmental agreements. The review aimed to achieve savings of £35 billion.

During 2009, the National Audit Office undertook a series of reviews of departmentally-reported CSR07 value for money savings.

=== 2010 Spending Review ===
The 2010 Spending Review (SR10) for the years 2011–2012 through to 2014–2015 was announced by the coalition government. This review was driven by a desire to reduce government spending in order to cut the budget deficit.

The new Chancellor George Osborne announced the details of the spending review on 20 October 2010. The cuts were described as the biggest since World War II. The review led to an £81 billion cut in public spending in the following 4 years of the parliament, with average departmental cuts of 19%. In addition major changes in welfare were announced including £7 billion of extra welfare cuts, changes to incapacity benefit, housing benefit and tax credits and a rise in the state pension age to 66 from 2020. Public sector employees would face a £3.5 billion increase in public pension contributions.

The Home Office faced cuts of 25%, local councils would face a yearly 7% cut in funding from central government each year until 2014. The Ministry of Defence faced cuts of around 8%. DEFRA withdrew funding support from seven waste management PFI projects where least progress had been made with contract procurement and obtaining planning permission, on the basis that the UK’s 2020 landfill diversion targets set by the EU could still be met without the curtailed projects. The government argued that the withdrawal of funding credits reflected "reasonable assumptions", and a legal challenge by Cheshire East and Cheshire West and Chester Councils against the DEFRA decision was unsuccessful. In addition many other public sector bodies saw cuts to their funding. Although not part of government, the BBC had its licence fee frozen for 6 years and took on the funding of the BBC World Service, BBC Monitoring and S4C.

The Office for Budget Responsibility predicted that the spending review led to a loss of about 490,000 public sector jobs by 2015. The NHS saw a 0.4% increase in spending in real terms over the following 4 years.

A £200 million payment was announced to compensate savers in the collapsed savings society Presbyterian Mutual.

A report published in late 2013 by Trust for London and the London School of Economics and Political Science estimated that local government budgets in London had taken a 33% real terms cut in central government funding for local government between 2009–2010 and 2013–2014.

=== 2013 Spending Round ===
The 2013 Spending Round (SR13) extended spending plans for the additional fiscal year of 2015–2016.

=== 2015 Spending Review ===
The 2015 Spending Review (SR15) for the years 2016–17 to 2019–20 (and for 2020-21 for some departments) was announced by Chancellor George Osborne alongside an Autumn Statement on 25 November 2015.

=== 2019 Spending Round ===
The 2019 Spending Round (SR19) was used by Chancellor Sajid Javid to set full spending plans for the fiscal year of 2020/21.

=== 2020 Spending Review ===
The 2020 Spending Review (SR20) was delivered by Chancellor Rishi Sunak as his first spending review on 25 November 2020. In contrast to previous years, and as a consequence of the COVID-19 pandemic, the review covered a one-year period from 1 April 2021 to 31 March 2022.

=== 2021 Spending Review ===
The 2021 Spending Review (SR21) was subsumed into the October 2021 budget. SR21 set departmental resource and capital budgets from 2022-23 to 2024-25 and covered the devolved administrations' block grants for the same period of time. Chancellor Jeremy Hunt's Autumn Statement of 17 November 2022 referred to the maintenance of committed budgets "for the remaining two years of this Spending Review", and similarly his March 2024 budget speech was described as "sticking to the plan".

=== 2024 Spending Round ===
The 2024 Spending Round (SR24), on 29 July 2024, and after Labour had won the 2024 general election, was a new multi-year spending review launched by Chancellor Rachel Reeves, noting that the Conservative government had not undertaken a spending review since 2021 (above) and that "unfunded" and "undisclosed" overspending of £21.9bn had created a need to make "a necessary and urgent decision" on government expenditure. She announced that spending reviews would now take place in alternating years, in each case with a minimum planning horizon looking three years ahead. The first phase of the Spending Round set the budgets for government departments for 2024-25 and 2025–26, while a second phase of the review, set to make further "difficult choices", was scheduled for completion in spring 2025.

Among the decisions Reeves referred to in July 2024 were to remove winter fuel payments from pensioners not receiving pension credit (roughly around 10 million people), and to cancel several road and rail infrastructure projects. Shadow Chancellor Jeremy Hunt dismissed Reeves' claims as "spurious", and argued that details of all government spending had been released by the Office for Budget Responsibility.

=== 2025 Spending Review ===
The 2025 Spending Review (SR25), on 11 June 2025, allocated funding for three fiscal years, from 2026–2027 to 2028–2029, and for capital spending for four fiscal years to 2029–2030.

== See also ==
- Multiannual Financial Framework – European Union framework regulating the annual budget
