= Second Reformation =

The term Second Reformation has been used in a number of contexts in Protestantism, implying a new or continuing Reformation.

- In Germany and Northern Europe, it generally refers to a period of Calvinist pressure on Lutheranism from about 1560 to 1619.
- The "Dutch Second Reformation" or Nadere Reformatie ("Another Reformation") is usually placed rather later, from about 1600 onwards, and had much in common with English Puritanism.
- For the Scottish Second Reformation in the 17th century, see Covenanters.
- In the Church of Ireland and Church of England, the Second Reformation was an evangelical campaign from the 1820s onwards, organised by theological conservatives.
- The Long Reformation is seen as a continuation of the mid sixteenth century legislative break from Rome and adoption of Protestant theology and worship by a multi-generational cultural Protestanization
