= Charles McMullen =

Irish Presbyterian minister

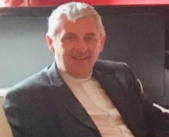

Charles McMullen is a former Irish Presbyterian minister (retired on June 29th 2025), elected in February 2018 as the moderator-elect of the Presbyterian Church in Ireland. He took office in June 2018, succeeding Noble McNeely. At the Assembly two controversial decisions were made. First, the Presbyterian Church in Ireland loosened its links to the Church of Scotland. Secondly, the Church received a report from its Doctrine Committee concerning the nature of a credible profession of faith with reference to those in same sex relationships.

McMullen is a regular contributor to BBC Radio Ulster's Thought for the Day.

He stepped down from his ministry role at Bangor West Church in June 2025 after 26 years of service - he joined the church in 1999 following a spell as a minister in Legacurry.
