= Ruth Patterson (minister) =

Cleric in Northern Ireland

Ruth Patterson, OBE (born 1944) is a Presbyterian ministry from Northern Ireland. She was the first woman to be ordained to the ministry of the Presbyterian Church in Ireland and is a director of the charity Restoration Ministries.

== Biography ==
Patterson was born in 1944. Her father, the Very Rev Dr Tom Patterson, was moderator of the Presbyterian Church (1977 to 1978), and her mother was a physician.

Patterson undertook a Bachelor of Arts (BA) degree in social studies at Queen's University, Belfast, graduating in 1966. This was followed by a Master of Social Work (MSW) degree in 1968 from the University of Toronto, specialising in community development. From 1971 to 1974, she trained for ordination at the University of Edinburgh, graduating with a Bachelor of Divinity (BD) degree.

Before attending theological college in Edinburgh, Patterson had worked on the chaplaincy team at Queen's University, Belfast alongside Ray Davey. She was ordained as a minister in the Presbyterian Church in Ireland in 1976. This made her the first woman in any denomination to be ordained in Ireland. She then served as a minister at Kilmakee Presbyterian Church in Dunmurry, Belfast. She stood twice to be moderator, but was not elected. She has been director of Restoration Ministries since 1991.

== Honours ==
- 2000 University of Edinburgh/Royal Bank of Scotland Alumnus of the Year
- 2001 Honorary Doctor of Divinity, Presbyterian Theological Faculty, Ireland
- 2003 OBE for public service
- 2024 Member of the Royal Irish Academy
