= Martyn C. Cowan =

Irish Presbyterian minister and academic

Martyn Calvin Cowan Rev. Dr
- Years active: 2016-
- Title: Vice Principal and Lecturer in Historical Theology
- Board member of: Doctrine Committee of the Presbyterian Church in Ireland

Academic background
- Education: University of Cambridge
- Thesis: The prophetic preaching of John Owen from 1646 to 1659 in its historical context' (2013)
- Doctoral advisor: Rev. Dr Stephen Hampton

Academic work
- Discipline: Church History
- Sub-discipline: John Owen studies
- Institutions: Union Theological College
- Notable works: John Owen and the Civil War Apocalypse: Preaching, Prophecy and Politics (Routledge, 2017)

Martyn Calvin Cowan is an Irish Presbyterian minister and lecturer in historical theology at the Union Theological College in Belfast, Ireland.

== Biography ==
Cowan studied philosophy at the undergraduate and postgraduate level at Queen's University Belfast. He trained for ordination at Oak Hill Theological College (MTh Distinction), and Union Theological College (PG Cert Min), and subsequently completed doctoral studies at the University of Cambridge with a dissertation entitled 'The prophetic preaching of John Owen from 1646 to 1659 in its historical context'.

Cowan served as assistant minister at First Presbyterian Church of Saintfield and assistant to the vacancy convener in First Presbyterian Church of Portadown. In 2016, he was ordained and appointed lecturer in historical theology at Union Theological College.

In 2018, Cowan was elected a Fellow of the Royal Historical Society. Some of his work has been described as more theological than historical, and Cowan's work on the preaching of John Owen is part of a new scholarly turn in Owen studies. Cowan has helped change Owen studies towards a more contextual interpretative approach. He has contributed towards the understanding of Owen as an exponent of prophetic preaching and has worked to raise the profile of John Owen studies, particularly in Northern Ireland.

As a member of the Doctrine Committee of the Presbyterian Church in Ireland and lecturer in historical theology at its seminary, Cowan addressed the decision made at the denomination's General Assembly in 2018 that it was necessary for people to make a "credible profession of faith" in order to receive the sacraments, which precluded people in same-sex relationships.

== Publications ==
- Sermons and Tracts from the Commonwealth and Protectorate (1650–1659), The Complete Works of John Owen Vol. 19 (Crossway, 2025). ISBN 9781433560484.
- Sermons and Tracts from the Civil Wars (1646–1649), The Complete Works of John Owen Vol. 18 (Crossway, 2025). ISBN 9781433560477.
- 'Owen the Preacher', in The T&T Clark Handbook of John Owen, ed. Crawford Gribben and John Tweeddale (T&T Clark, 2023), 118–45. ISBN 9780567688750.
- John Owen and the Civil War Apocalypse: Preaching, Prophecy and Politics (Routledge, 2017). ISBN 9781138087767.
- Portrait of a Prophet: Lessons from the Preaching of John Owen (1616–1683) (St Antholin Charity Lectureship, Latimer Trust, 2016) ISBN 9781906327415
- 'Introduction to the Old Testament Historical Books' in NIV Proclamation Bible: Correctly Handling the Word of Truth (Hodder & Stoughton, 2013). ISBN 9780310437956
- 'New World, New Temple, New Worship: The Book of Revelation in the Theology and Practice of Christian Worship', published in three parts: Churchman 119.4 (Winter 2005), 297–312; Churchman 120.2 (Summer 2006), 159–176; Churchman 120.3 (Autumn 2006), 247–265.
