= Ruth Patterson =

Ruth Patterson may refer to:

- Ruth Patterson (minister)
- Ruth Patterson (politician)
