= Evangelical Presbyterian Church (Ireland) =

Calvinist, Christian evangelical denomination

Evangelical Presbyterian Church in Ireland
- Classification: Protestant
- Orientation: Calvinist
- Polity: Presbyterian
- Region: Northern Ireland
- Founder: James Hunter, W.J. Grier
- Origin: 15 October 1927; Belfast
- Separated from: Irish Presbyterian Church
- Congregations: 10
- Members: 508 (Average attendance)
- Ministers: 10
- Missionaries: <10
- Official website: www.epcni.org.uk

The Evangelical Presbyterian Church (EPC) is a Calvinist, Christian evangelical denomination that is found only in Northern Ireland, where it is the smallest of the Presbyterian churches. It was formed on 15 October 1927 (as the Irish Evangelical Church [Eaglais Soisgealach na hÉireann]) by Rev. James Hunter (1863–1942), former minister of Knock Presbyterian Church (Belfast), and James (W.J.) Grier, a former student at the Assembly's College (the Presbyterian theological college in Belfast). They were joined by others who seceded from the Irish Presbyterian Church (now called the Presbyterian Church in Ireland).

== History ==
Development of the Presbyterian churches

The breakaway was prompted by the acquittal in a Presbytery trial of Professor James E. Davey of the Assembly's College on charges brought by Hunter and others of five counts of heresy. Davey's accusers, who had campaigned against him and against what they termed "modernism" through a Presbyterian Bible Standards League, were influenced by the conservative Reformed theology of the US Presbyterian scholar John Gresham Machen, who had taught Grier in Princeton Theological Seminary and visited Ireland in 1927. A month after the Presbyterian General Assembly upheld the trial verdict by 707 votes to 82, the anti-Davey group seceded.

Soon after the Irish Evangelical Church was constituted in October 1927, it had six congregations in Belfast, two in County Antrim and two in County Tyrone. It adopted its present name in 1964. In 2013 the EPC had nine congregations, all in Counties Antrim and Down apart from one in Richhill, County Armagh and one in Omagh, County Tyrone.

The church's monthly magazine, The Irish Evangelical, was first issued in June 1928. Grier remained its editor for 50 years. With the change of the church's name in 1964, the magazine became The Evangelical Presbyterian, and now appears every three months.

The Evangelical Presbyterian Church is among a number of small evangelical denominations represented in a creationist and socially conservative pressure group, the Caleb Foundation. EPC member Wallace Thompson, who had been the Foundation's treasurer since 1998, succeeded as chairman of the Foundation in September 2009. The EPC in 2010 opposed a Bill of Rights for Northern Ireland on the grounds that the Northern Ireland Human Rights Commission's proposal was "driven by those who are opposed to Biblical Christianity" and "is a further departure from the solid foundation of the Word of God". In 2011–12 the EPC Public Morals Committee supported a campaign by the Christian Institute, an evangelical pressure group, against funding of the London Pride festival by Tesco.

== International links ==
The church allied from its early days with the Free Church of Scotland and has co-operated with it in missionary work, focussing since 1932 on India, South Africa and Peru. Also from 1987 an EPC minister has served in Nigeria.

The church has connections to other mission agencies through the involvement of some of its members and former members, e.g., AIM (Uganda and Chad), Mission Africa (Nigeria), and Africa Christian TextbookS (ACTS), a non-profit publisher supplying affordable books to African pastors, founded by EPC minister Rev. Sid Garland.

Formerly a member of the Reformed Ecumenical Council (REC), the EPC was among a group of conservative churches that broke away from the REC over its refusal to expel the Reformed Churches in the Netherlands (Synodal) (GKN-s, Dutch: Gereformeerde Kerken in Nederland-synodaal) for deciding in 1979 to allow the ordination of non-celibate gay people. It then joined the International Conference of Reformed Churches.

== Links to churches in UK and Ireland ==
The EPC has played a part in the development of, and continues in close fellowship with, the Evangelical Presbyterian Church of England and Wales. Relations with other evangelical churches in the UK and Ireland are conducted through membership of Affinity.

== Doctrine ==
In developing its theological subordinate standards, the new church at first adopted eight Articles of Faith based on the Westminster Standards (1646–49). However, after differences arose within the church over the theology of dispensationalism, the church from 1928 has required all its officers to pledge their support to the Westminster Catechisms and, subsequently, the Westminster Confession of Faith, "without any reservations". Thus, the church upholds the doctrines of the Trinity, Jesus' sacrificial death and resurrection, sola scriptura, sola fide, double predestination (alongside freedom of choice), the covenant of works with Adam, that assurance of salvation is not a necessary consequence of faith, a regulative principle of worship, strict sabbatarianism, and that the Roman Catholic doctrine of Transubstantiation in the Mass is unscriptural and can be a cause of superstition or idolatry. In common with some other Reformed churches, the EPC in its Code has amended three clauses in the Confession, namely, those concerning the Antichrist, consanguinity, and the civil magistrate.

== Politics ==
The EPC encourages its members to exercise their right to vote in elections, and to apply Biblical principles to their choices. It does not have links to any political parties.

== Church meetings ==
All EPC churches normally hold two services on Sundays, and a midweek meeting for prayer and Bible study. Additional meetings vary from one congregation to another, but include Sunday Schools, youth clubs, ladies’ meetings, Parent & Toddler groups, addiction support, children’s meetings and summer clubs for children and young people.

== Conferences ==
The EPC holds an annual Presbytery Day Conference/Family Day in April or May, when the congregations meet together and hear a visiting speaker, with crèche facilities, a bookstall laid on by the Evangelical Bookshop, refreshments and lunch. Recent speakers have included Achille Blaize, Geoff Thomas, Edward Donnelly and Derek Thomas.

== Bookshop ==
The EPC is closely linked to the Evangelical Book Shop, a separate charity, at 15 College Square East, Belfast, and online at http://www.evangelicalbookshop.co.uk.

In 2016 the Bookshop published a history of the EPC by Ernest C. Brown, entitled By Honour and Dishonour.

== Other Presbyterian churches in Ireland ==
- Free Presbyterian Church of Ulster
- Non-subscribing Presbyterian Church of Ireland
- Presbyterian Church in Ireland
- Reformed Presbyterian Church of Ireland
