= Ken Newell =

Ken Newell OBE
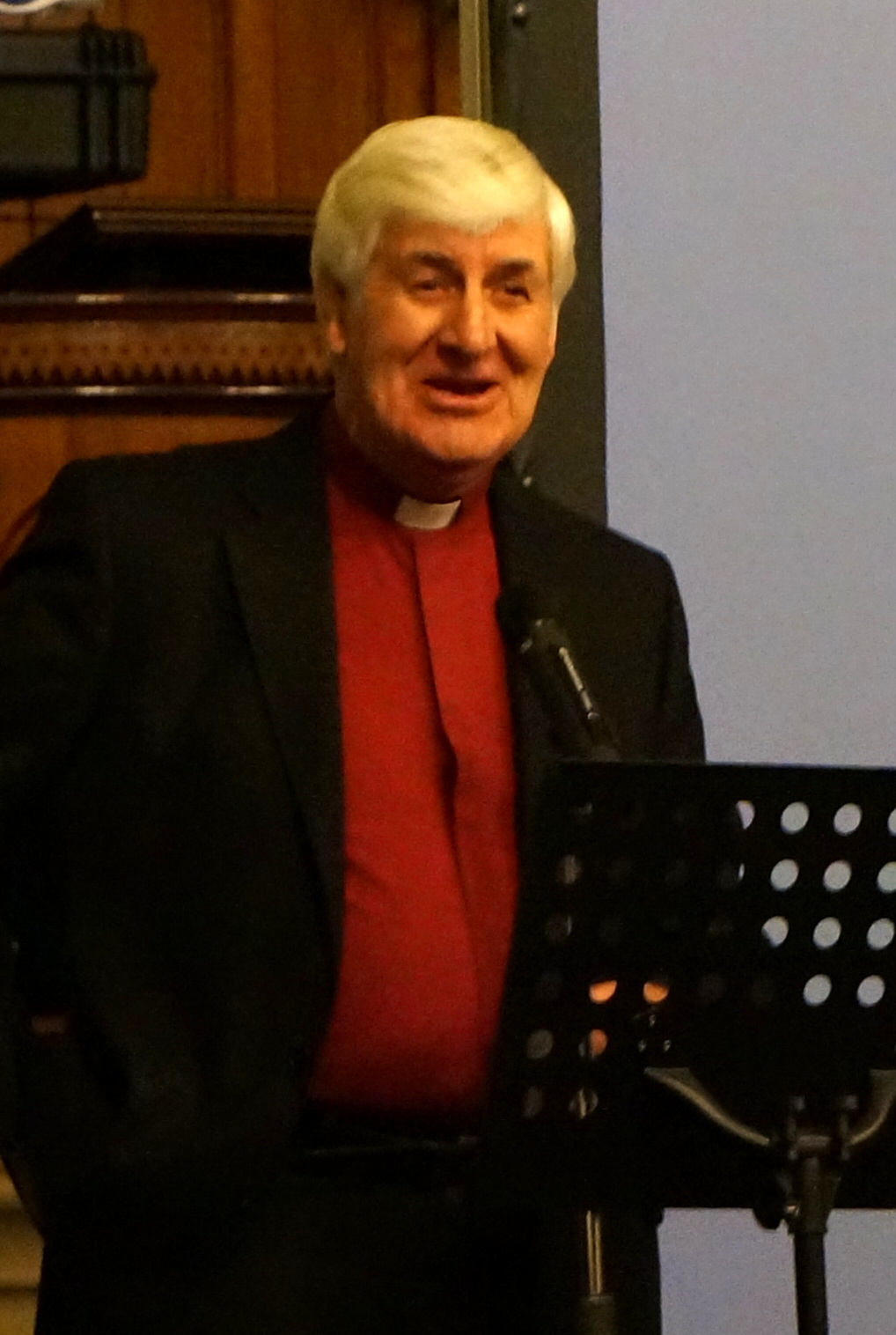
- Newell in Fitzroy Presbyterian Church, Belfast in 2013
- Born: Kenneth Norman Ernest Newell; 1942 (age 82–83); Belfast, Northern Ireland
- Occupations: Presbyterian minister Moderator of the General Assembly of the Presbyterian Church in Ireland

Kenneth Norman Ernest Newell, OBE, is a retired Irish Presbyterian minister. He served as Moderator of the General Assembly of the Presbyterian Church in Ireland (June 2004 – 2005), and was the minister of Fitzroy Presbyterian Church, until his retirement on 21 September 2008.

== Biography ==
Newell was born in Belfast in 1942, just after the Blitz. In 1976, at the height of the Troubles, he returned to Belfast from a teaching post on the island of Timor in Indonesia.

He served as Moderator of the General Assembly of the Presbyterian Church in Ireland (June 2004 – 2005), and was the minister of Fitzroy Presbyterian Church until his retirement on 21 September 2008.

His time as a minister was marked by a commitment to peacemaking, and he was responsible for building relationships in communities in Belfast.

== Books ==
- Captured by a Vision (2016) Colourpoint Books, ISBN 978-1780731032

Presbyterian Church titles
Preceded by Ivan Alexander McKay (2003)	Moderator of the Presbyterian Church in Ireland; 2004	Succeeded by Robert Ernest Henry Uprichard (2005)
