= List of moderators of the Presbyterian Church in Ireland =

The moderator of the General Assembly of the Presbyterian Church in Ireland is the most senior office-bearer within the Presbyterian Church in Ireland, which is Northern Ireland's largest Protestant denomination.

== Role of moderator ==
The moderator is elected by the General Assembly and serves for one year as the public representative of the denomination. The moderator may be either a teaching or ruling elder from within the denomination but, as yet, no ruling elder has ever been elected to the role. The appointee's formal role involves acting as the moderator of the General Assembly. During the rest of the year, the moderator acts as an ambassador for the General Assembly and for the Presbyterian Church in Ireland as a whole.

The government of the Presbyterian Church in Ireland has a form known as Presbyterian polity, and is much like that of other Presbyterian churches around the world. Individual churches are represented at both the Presbytery (local) level and General Assembly (All Ireland) level.

The serving moderator is given the honorific style Right Reverend (Rt. Rev.). Former moderators are known as Very Reverend (Very Rev.). The moderator and the two Church of Ireland and two Roman Catholic archbishops are thirteenth to seventeenth in the order of precedence in Northern Ireland, according to the seniority of their consecration or election.

== Current moderator ==
The current moderator is Rev. Dr Richard Murray, who had previously served as moderator from 2024 to 2025. He became Moderator on the 1st December 2025, following the resignation of Trevor Gribben, who had served as moderator since that June.

Rev. Richard Kerr, the minister of Templepatrick Presbyterian, was elected Moderator by presbyteries in February 2026. He will assume the role of Moderator at General Assembly in June, and serve until 2027.

== Past moderators ==
1. 1840 Samuel Hanna D.D. (Rosemary Street, Belfast)
2. 1841 Henry Cooke D.D., LL.D. (May Street, Belfast)
3. 1842 John Edgar D.D., LL.D. (Fitzroy, Belfast)
4. 1843 Robert Stewart D.D. (First Broughshane)
5. 1844 John Brown (Aghadowey)
6. 1845 James Carlile (Birr and Abbey, Dublin)
7. 1846 James Morgan (Fisherwick, Belfast)
8. 1847 William McClure (Londonderry)
9. 1848 Henry Jackson Dobbin (First Ballymena)
10. 1849 John Barnett (Moneymore)
11. 1850 William Bailey Kirkpatrick (Abbey, Dublin)
12. 1851 John Coulter (Gilnahirk)
13. 1852 John Bleckley A.M. (First Monaghan)
14. 1853 Henry William Molyneaux D.D. (First Larne)
15. 1854 David Hamilton (Belfast)
16. 1855 Robert Allen A.M. (Ballina)
17. 1856 Robert Wilson (Assembly's College, Belfast)
18. 1857 Alexander Porter Goudy (Strabane)
19. 1858 John Johnston A.M., D.D. (Tullylish)
20. 1859 William Gibson (Assembly's College, Belfast)
21. 1860 Samuel Marcus Dill (First Ballymena)
22. 1861 John Macnaughton (Rosemary Street, Belfast)
23. 1862 Henry Cooke (May Street, Belfast)
24. 1863 John Rogers (Second Comber)
25. 1864 John Rogers (Second Comber)
26. 1865 David Wilson (Limerick)
27. 1866 David Wilson (Limerick)
28. 1867 Robert Montgomery (India)
29. 1868 Charles Lucas Morell (Dungannon)
30. 1869 Richard Smyth (First Derry)
31. 1870 Richard Smyth (First Derry)
32. 1871 Lowry Edmonds Berkley (First Lurgan)
33. 1872 William Johnston (Townsend Street, Belfast)
34. 1873 William Johnston (Townsend Street, Belfast)
35. 1874 William Magill (Trinity, Cork)
36. 1875 Josias Leslie Porter (Belfast)
37. 1876 John Meneely (First Ballymacarrett, Belfast)
38. 1877 George Bellis (Belfast)
39. 1878 Thomas Witherow (Magee College, Londonderry)
40. 1879 Robert Watts (Belfast)
41. 1880 Jackson Smyth (First Armagh)
42. 1881 William Fleming Stevenson (Rathgar, Dublin)
43. 1882 Thomas Young Killen (Duncairn, Belfast)
44. 1883 Hamilton Brown Wilson (First Cookstown)
45. 1884 James Maxwell Rogers (Great James Street, Londonderry)
46. 1885 James Weir Whigham (Ballinasloe)
47. 1886 Robert Ross (Carlisle Road, Londonderry)
48. 1887 John Henry Orr (High Street, Antrim)
49. 1888 Robert John Lynd (May Street, Belfast)
50. 1889 William Clarke (Trinity, Bangor)
51. 1890 William Park (Rosemary Street, Belfast)
52. 1891 Nathaniel McAuley Brown (Drumachose, Limavady)
53. 1892 R. McCheyne Edgar (Adelaide Road, Dublin)
54. 1893 W. Todd Martin (Belfast)
55. 1894 W. Todd Martin (Belfast)
56. 1895 George Raphael Buick (Cuningham Memorial, Cullybackey)
57. 1896 Henry McIlree Williamson (Fisherwick, Belfast)
58. 1897 Matthew Leitch (Assembly's College, Belfast)
59. 1898 William Beatty (Knock, Belfast)
60. 1899 David Alexander Taylor (Second Comber)
61. 1900 John McC. Hamilton (Donore, Dublin)
62. 1901 James Heron (Belfast)
63. 1902 John Edgar Henry (Strand, Londerderry)
64. 1903 John MacDermott (Belmont, Belfast)
65. 1904 Samuel Prenter (Ormond Quay, Dublin)
66. 1905 William McMordie (Mourne, Kilkeel)
67. 1906 William McKean (First Ballymacarrett, Belfast)
68. 1907 John Davidson (Glennan)
69. 1908 John McIlveen (Crescent, Belfast)
70. 1909 John Courtenay Clarke (Galway)
71. 1910 John Howard Murphy (Trinity, Cork)
72. 1911 John Macmillan (Cooke Centenary, Belfast)
73. 1912 Henry Montgomery (Shankill Road Mission, Belfast)
74. 1913 William John Macauley (First Portadown)
75. 1914 James Bingham (Dundonald)
76. 1915 Thomas Hamill (Belfast)
77. 1916 Thomas West (First Antrim)
78. 1917 John Irwin (Belfast)
79. 1918 James McGranahan (First Derry)
80. 1919 John Morrow Simms (Newtownards)
81. 1920 Hugh Patterson Glenn (Bray)
82. 1921 William James Lowe (Clerk of the General Assembly)
83. 1922 William Gordon Strahan (First Newry)
84. 1923 George Thompson (Cliftonville, Belfast)
85. 1924 Robert Wilson Hamilton (Railway Street, Lisburn)
86. 1925 Thomas Haslett (First Ballymena)
87. 1926 Robert Kennedy Hanna (Adelaide Road, Dublin)
88. 1927 James Thompson (Great James Street, Londonderry)
89. 1928 Thomas Alexander Smyth (Great Victoria Street, Belfast)
90. 1929 John Love Morrow (Clontarf, Dublin)
91. 1930 Edward Clarke (Strabane)
92. 1931 James Gilbert Paton (Malone, Belfast)
93. 1932 James Jordan Macaulay (Rathgar, Dublin)
94. 1933 William Corkey (Windsor, Belfast)
95. 1934 Thomas McGimpsey Johnston (Newington, Belfast)
96. 1935 Andrew Frederick Moody (Cliftonville, Belfast)
97. 1936 F. W. S. O'Neill (Belfast)
98. 1937 John Waddell (Fisherwick, Belfast)
99. 1938 William John Currie (First Bangor)
100. 1939 James Haire (Assembly's College, Belfast)
101. 1940 James Barkley Woodburn (Fitzroy)
102. 1941 W. A. Watson (Belfast)
103. 1942 Wilson Moreland Kennedy (First Derry)
104. 1943 Phineas McKee (Downshire Road, Newry)
105. 1944 Andrew Gibson (Trinity, Cork)
106. 1945 Robert Corkey (Assembly's College, Belfast)
107. 1946 Thomas Byers (Ormond Quay & Scots, Dublin)
108. 1947 Robert Boyd (Belfast)
109. 1948 Alfred William Neill (First Armagh)
110. 1949 Gordon Douglas Erskine (Rosemary, Belfast)
111. 1950 Joseph Hugh Rush Gibson O.B.E., M.A. (Clerk of the General Assembly)
112. 1951 Hugh McIlroy B.A. (Ryans)
113. 1952 John Knox Leslie McKean M.A. (First Comber)
114. 1953 James Ernest Davey M.A. (Assembly's College, Belfast)
115. 1954 John Knowles B.A. (Tullylish)
116. 1955 James Carlyle Breakey B.A. (Fortwilliam Park, Belfast)
117. 1956 Thomas McCurdy Barker M.A. (Donegal)
118. 1957 Robert John Wilson M.A. (Assembly's College, Belfast)
119. 1958 William McAdam M.A. (First Newry)
120. 1959 Thomas Alexander Byers Smyth B.A. (Rathgar, Dublin)
121. 1960 Austin Alfred Fulton M.A., PhD (Assembly's Foreign Mission)
122. 1961 William Alexander Albert Park M.A. (Ballygilbert, Bangor)
123. 1962 John Higginson Davey B.A. (Missionary to India)
124. 1963 William Alexander Montgomery M.A. (Strand, Londonderry)
125. 1964 James Dunlop M.A. (Oldpark, Belfast)
126. 1965 Samuel James Park M.A. (Dún Laoghaire)
127. 1966 Alfred Martin M.A. (Lowe Memorial, Finaghy)
128. 1967 William Boyd M.A. (First Lisburn)
129. 1968 John Herbert Withers B.A. (Fisherwick, Belfast)
130. 1969 John Talbot Carson B.A. (Trinity, Bangor)
131. 1970 James Loughridge Mitchell Haire M.A., M.Th. (Assembly's College, Belfast)
132. 1971 Frederick Rupert Gibson B.A. (Superintendent of The Irish Mission)
133. 1972 Robert Victor Alexander Lynas O.B.E., B.A., B.D.(Gardenmore, Larne)
134. 1973 John Whiteford Orr B.A. (Bloomfield, Belfast)
135. 1974 George Temple Lundie M.A., LL.B. (First Armagh)
136. 1975 George Frederick Hampton Wynne B.A. (Great James Street, Londonderry) Died one month in office and Temple Lundie retook the job for the year.
137. 1976 Andrew John Weir MSc (Clerk of the General Assembly)
138. 1977 Thomas Algeo Patterson B.A. (Portaferry)
139. 1978 David Burke B.A. (Hamilton Road, Bangor)
140. 1979 William Magee Craig M.A., B.D. (First Portadown)
141. 1980 Ronald Gavin Craig B.A. (First Carrickfergus)
142. 1981 John Girvan B.A. (Hill Street, Lurgan)
143. 1982 Eric Paul Gardner B.A. (First Ballymena)
144. 1983 Thomas John Simpson M.A., LL.B., Dip.Ed., D.Litt. (Clerk of General Assembly)
145. 1984 Howard Cromie M.A., B.D. (Railway Street, Lisburn)
146. 1985 Robert Dickinson M.A., B.D., PhD, Th.D. (Tobermore and Draperstown)
147. 1986 John Thompson B.A., B.D., PhD (Union Theological College, Belfast)
148. 1987 William Fleming B.A. (Abbot's Cross, Belfast)
149. 1988 Andrew William Godfrey Brown B.A., B.D., PhD, Litt.D. (Ballycastle)
150. 1989 James Alexander Matthews B.A., B.D. (First Lurgan)
151. 1990 Robert Finlay Gregg Holmes M.A., M.Litt. (Union Theological College, Belfast)
152. 1991 Rodney Sterritt B.A. (Greenwell Street, Newtownards)
153. 1992 John Dunlop C.B.E., B.A. B.D., LL.D. (Rosemary, Belfast)
154. 1993 Andrew Rutherford Rodgers M.A. (Dungannon)
155. 1994 David Joseph McGaughey B.A. (Mourne, Kilkeel)
156. 1995 John Ross B.A. (High Street, Holywood)
157. 1996 David Henry Allen M.A., B.D. (New Row, Coleraine)
158. 1997 Samuel Hutchinson B.A., B.D., M.Th. (Clerk of the General Assembly)
159. 1998 Samuel John Dixon B.A. (First Antrim)
160. 1999 John William Lockington B.A., B.D., M.Th., PhD (Gardenmore, Larne)
161. 2000 Trevor William John Morrow M.A., B.D., M.Th., PhD(Lucan, Dublin)
162. 2001 Hugh Alastair Dunlop B.A., B.D. (Knock, Belfast)
163. 2002 Russell Ivan Birney B.A., B.D., D.Min. (High Kirk, Ballymena)
164. 2003 Ivan Alexander McKay B.A., B.D. (Dundonald)
165. 2004 Kenneth Norman Ernest Newell B.A., B.D., M.Th. (Fitzroy, Belfast)
166. 2005 Robert Ernest Henry Uprichard B.A., B.D., M.Th., Ph.D., D.D.(Trinity, Ahoghill)
167. 2006 David Clarke LL.B., B.D. (Terrace Row, Coleraine)
168. 2007 John Mateer Finlay B.A., B.D. (Harryville, Ballymena)
169. 2008 William Donald Patton B.S.Sc., B.D., PhD (Old Congregation, Randalstown)
170. 2009 John Stafford Carson BSc, M.A., MAR, M.Th. (First Portadown)
171. 2010 Thomas Norman Hamilton O.B.E, B.A., B.D. (Ballysillan, Belfast)
172. 2011 Ivan James Patterson B.A., M.Th. (Newcastle)
173. 2012 Robert Alexander Patton B.A., B.D. (Ballygilbert)
174. 2013 Robert Lyle Craig B.A., B.D. (Kilfennan, Londonderry)
175. 2014 Michael Alexander Barry B.A., B.D., D.Min. (First Newry)
176. 2015 David Ian James McNie B.D., M.Min. (Trinity, Ballymoney)
177. 2016 Frank Sellar B.A.(Hons), P.G.C.E., B.D., M.Min. (Bloomfield, Belfast)
178. 2017 Noble McNeely B.Ed. B.D. D.D. (First Holywood)
179. 2018 Charles McMullen M.A., M. Litt., B.D. (West, Bangor)
180. 2019 William Henry B.Sc. (Maze)
181. 2020 David Bruce B.S.Sc. B.D. (Secretary of the Council of Mission in Ireland)
182. 2021 David Bruce B.S.Sc. B.D. (Secretary of the Council of Mission in Ireland)
183. 2022 John Kirkpatrick (Portrush)
184. 2023 Sam Mawhinney (Adelaide Road, Dublin)
185. 2024 Richard Murray (Drumreagh)
186. 2025 Trevor Gribben (Clerk of the General Assembly)
187. 2025 Richard Murray (Drumreagh)

== See also ==
- Moderator of the General Assembly of the Church of Scotland
