= British Reformation =

British Reformation may refer to:

- English Reformation, the Protestant Reformation in England and Wales (c. 1527 – c. 1600, or into the 18th century as the "long Reformation", depending on definitions); resulted in the primacy in England and Wales of the Church of England, a decline in Catholicism there, and considerable spread of Anglicanism–Episcopalianism (and other Protestant offshoots thereof) to British colonial possessions
- Scottish Reformation, the Protestant Reformation in Scotland (c. 1560 – c. 1620s, or to 1688 or 1745, depending on definitions); resulted in the primacy in Scotland of the Kirk (Church of Scotland), a Presbyterian denomination, and the decline of Catholicism there, with missionary spread of Presbyterianism (in several vying forms) to the north of Ireland and to Scots-settled areas of British colonies
- Reformation in Ireland, the spread of the English Reformation to Ireland (c. 1536 –1691, or to 1829, depending on definitions), then a possession of the British crown; resulted in the establishment of the (Anglican) Church of Ireland, but little ultimate effect on the Catholic majority worship in what today is the Republic of Ireland
