= Noble McNeely =

Irish church moderator from 2017–2018

The Right Reverend Noble McNeely was the Moderator of the Presbyterian Church in Ireland from 2017 until 2018.

== Early life and education ==
Born in Belfast, McNeely was brought up in Crossgar, Co Down. He studied teaching at Stranmillis College from 1972 to 1976 and taught high school for two years. He obtained his Bachelor of Divinity degree at Union Theological College in 1981.

== Career ==
He was licensed in Lissara Presbyterian Church (1981) and ordained as Assistant Minister in Fisherwick Presbyterian Church in 1982. He was called to First Ballymoney Presbyterian Church in 1984 and in 1997 he became Minister of First Holywood Presbyterian Church.

McNeely became Moderator of the General Assembly on 5 June 2017. In February 2018 Charles McMullan was elected as moderator-elect to succeed McNeely, to take office in June 2018.

Presbyterian Church titles
Preceded by Frank Sellar (2016)	Moderator of the Presbyterian Church in Ireland; June 2017 - June 2018	Succeeded by Charles McMullen
