= Henry McIlree Williamson =

Irish-born minister of the Free Church of Scotland

Henry McIlree Williamson (1824–1898) was an Irish-born minister of the Free Church of Scotland who served as Moderator of the General Assembly to the Presbyterian Church in Ireland in 1896.

== Life ==
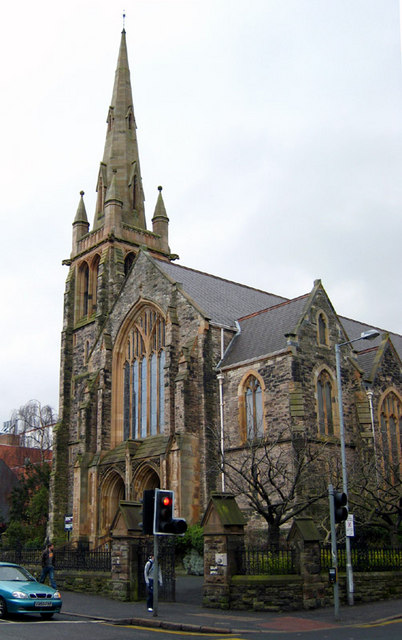
Fisherwick Church in Belfast

He was born in Lisnadill in County Armagh in what is now Northern Ireland in 1824. He was the son of David Williamson and his wife, Leoncia McIlree.

He studied at Trinity College, Dublin. He then trained as a minister for the newly created Free Church of Scotland, training at New College, Edinburgh, from 1845 to 1849. He was ordained as a minister of the Free church of Scotland in 1850 at Dunblane. In 1855 he translated to Huntly, Aberdeenshire and in 1867 to the Free High Kirk of Aberdeen. In Aberdeen he lived at 44 King Street.

In 1870 he left the Free Church of Scotland and returned to Ireland as minister of Fisherwick Church in Belfast, as a minister of the Presbyterian Church in Ireland. This was initially as assistant to Rev Dr James Morgan, but from 1873 he became minister in charge.

In 1896 he succeeded Rev George Raphael Buick as Moderator of the General Assembly.

He died on 29 December 1898.

A stained glass window in Fisherwick Church is dedicated to his memory.

== Family ==
The name of his first wife is not known but he is listed as a "widower" in the 1851 census.

In 1855 he married the 18-year-old Catherine Charlotte Robertson (1837-1864). They had four sons and one daughter, one son dying in infancy. Their son James Robert David Williamson (1856-1891) also became a Free Church minister. His namesake son, Henry McIlree Williamon (1858-1948) died in Edinburgh.

In 1866 he married the 22-year-old Jessie Maria Gibson (b.1842 in Nova Scotia.

His daughter Barbara Williamson married William Henderson Calvert and were parents to the poet Raymond Calvert.

His son Charles Frederick Williamson (1868-1915) married a nurse, Edith Nugent, and they moved to India. They had seven further children: three sons and for daughters.
