= Reformation in Ireland =

The Reformation in Ireland was a movement for the reform of religious life and institutions that was introduced into Ireland by the English Crown at the behest of King Henry VIII of England. His desire for an annulment of his marriage was known as the King's Great Matter. Ultimately Pope Clement VII refused the petition; consequently, in order to give legal effect to his wishes, it became necessary for the King to assert his lordship over the Catholic Church in his realm. In passing the Acts of Supremacy in 1534, the English Parliament confirmed the King's supremacy over the Church in the Kingdom of England. This challenge to Papal supremacy resulted in a breach with the Catholic Church. By 1541, the Irish Parliament had agreed to the change in status of the country from that of a Lordship to that of Kingdom of Ireland.

Unlike similar movements for religious reform on the continent of Europe, the various phases of the English Reformation as it developed in Ireland were largely driven by changes in government policy, to which public opinion in England gradually accommodated itself. In Ireland, however, the government's policy was not embraced by public opinion; the majority of the population continued to adhere to Catholicism.

The Reformation in Ireland faced significant challenges, resulting in limited success compared to other regions. A major factor was the scarcity of Protestant preachers throughout the sixteenth century, which hindered the spread of Reformation ideas and the establishment of indigenous support. This lack of local backing made it difficult to enforce and circulate Protestant reforms during Elizabeth I's reign. As the movement struggled to gain a foothold among the native population, it was often perceived as an extension of English colonization efforts, leading to resistance from both the Irish Gaelic and Old English communities, who viewed it as a threat to their cultural and religious identities.

== Religious policy of Henry VIII ==
Norman and English monarchs used the title "Lord of Ireland" to refer to their Irish conquests dating from the Norman invasion of Ireland. In passing the Crown of Ireland Act 1542, the Irish Parliament granted Henry, by his command, a new title – King of Ireland. The state was renamed the Kingdom of Ireland. The King desired this innovation because the Lordship of Ireland had been granted by the Papacy; technically, he held the Lordship in fief from the Pope. As Henry had been excommunicated in 1533 and again in 1538, he worried that his title could be withdrawn by his overlord, the Pope.

Henry also arranged for the Irish Parliament to declare him the head of the "Church in Ireland". The main instrument of state power in the establishment of the state church in the new Kingdom of Ireland was the Archbishop of Dublin, George Brown. He was appointed by the King upon the death of the incumbent, though without the approval of the Pope. The Archbishop arrived in Ireland in 1536. The reforms were continued by Henry's successor, Edward VI. The Church of Ireland claims Apostolic succession because of the continuity in the hierarchy; however this claim is disputed by the Catholic Church, which asserts, in Apostolicae curae, that Anglican orders are invalid.

Henry's sanctions on outspoken Catholics and Lutherans differed; Catholics loyal to the Holy See were to be prosecuted as traitors, while Lutherans, much rarer in Ireland, were to be burned at the stake as heretics. He promulgated the Six Articles Act in 1539.

Henry died in 1547. In his reign, prayers remained the same, with the Latin Breviary still used until the Book of Common Prayer (in English) was introduced from 1549. From 1548, for the first time, Irish Communicants were given wine and bread; the former Roman Rite of the Mass allowed a congregation to be given bread only, with wine taken by the priest.

=== Dissolution of the monasteries ===
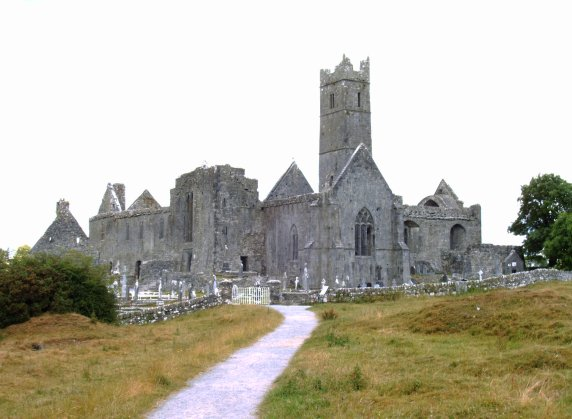
Quin Abbey, a Franciscan friary built in the 15th century and suppressed in 1541

The dissolutions in Ireland followed a very different course from those in England and Wales. There were around 400 religious houses in Ireland in 1530 – many more, relative to population and material wealth than in England and Wales. In marked distinction to the situation in England, in Ireland the houses of friars had flourished in the 15th century, attracting popular support and financial endowments, undertaking many ambitious building schemes, and maintaining a regular conventual and spiritual life. They constituted around half of the total number of religious houses. Irish monasteries, by contrast, had experienced a catastrophic decline in numbers, such that by the 16th century, it appears that only a minority maintained the daily religious observance of the Divine Office. Henry's direct authority, as Lord of Ireland, and from 1541 as King of Ireland, only extended to the area of the Pale immediately around Dublin. From the late 1530s, his administrators temporarily succeeded in persuading some clan chiefs to adopt his policy of surrender and regrant, including the adoption of his state religion.

Nevertheless, Henry was determined to carry through a policy of dissolution in Ireland – and in 1537 introduced legislation into the Irish Parliament to legalise the closure of monasteries. The process faced considerable opposition, and only sixteen houses were suppressed. Henry remained resolute however, and from 1541 as part of the Tudor conquest of Ireland, he continued to press for the area of successful dissolution to be extended. For the most part, this involved making deals with local lords, under which monastic property was granted away in exchange for oaths of allegiance to the new Irish Crown; consequently, Henry acquired little if any of the wealth of the Irish houses. By the time of Henry's death in 1547, around half of the Irish monastic houses had been suppressed, but many houses of friars continued to resist dissolution until well into the reign of Elizabeth I.

=== Bishoprics ===
During the English Reformation, the Church of Ireland suffered in its temporal affairs:

... more than half the clerical property in the kingdom being vested in lay hands; but that of Ireland was in a manner annihilated. Bishopricks, colleges, glebes and tithes were divided without mercy amongst the great men of the time, or leased out on small rents for ever to the friends and relations of the incumbents. Many Irish bishopricks never recovered this devastation, as Aghadoe, Kilfenora and others. The Bishoprick of Ferns was left not worth one shilling. Killala, the best in Ireland, was worth only 300l. per annum; Clonfert, 200l.; the Archbishoprick of Cashel, 100l.; Waterford, 100l.; Cork, only 70l.; Ardagh, 1l. 1s. 8d.; and the rest at even a lower rate.

== Religious policy of Edward VI ==
Henry's son Edward VI (1547–53) formally established Protestantism as the state religion, which was as much a religious matter as his father's reformation had been political. His reign only lasted for six years and his principal reform, the Act of Uniformity 1549, had much less impact in Ireland than in England. He abolished the crime of heresy in 1547.

During his reign, attempts were made to introduce Protestant liturgy and bishops to Ireland. These attempts were met with hostility from within the Church, even by those who had previously conformed. In 1551, a printing press was established in Dublin which printed a Book of Common Prayer in English.

== Religious policy of Queen Mary I ==
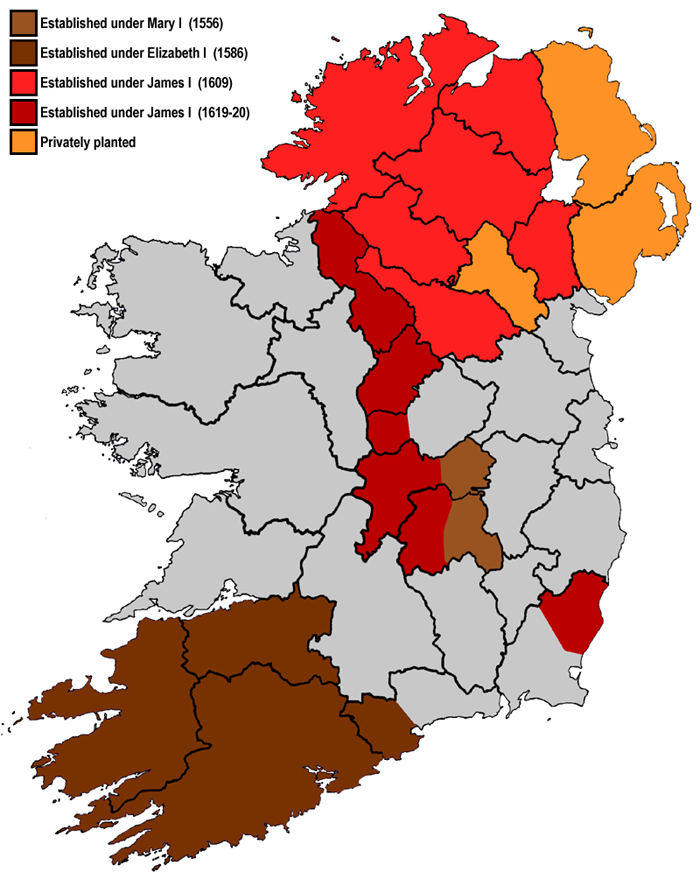
The counties in Ireland subjected to British plantations (1556 to 1620). Note that this map is a simplified one, as the amount of land colonised did not cover the entire shaded area.

Henry's and Edward's efforts were then reversed by Queen Mary I (1553–1558), who had always been Catholic. On her ascent to the throne, Mary reimposed orthodox Roman Catholicism by the First and Second Statute of Repeal of 1553 and 1555. When some Episcopal sees in Ireland became vacant, clerics loyal to Rome were chosen by Mary, with the approval of the Pope. In other cases, bishops in possession of dioceses that had been appointed by her father, without the approval of the Pope, were deposed.

She arranged for the Act of Supremacy (which asserted England's independence from papal authority) to be repealed in 1554, and also revived the Heresy Acts. In turn it was agreed that the former monasteries would stay dissolved, so as to preserve the loyalty of those who had bought monastic lands, by an Act passed in January 1555 and the agreement of Pope Julius III. In Ireland Mary started the first planned wholesale plantations of settlers from England that, ironically, soon came to be associated with Protestantism.

In 1554, she married Philip, Prince of Asturias, who in 1558 became the King of Spain. Philip and Mary were also granted a papal bull in 1555 by Pope Paul IV to reconfirm their status as the Catholic King and Queen of the new Kingdom of Ireland.

Also in 1555, the Peace of Augsburg established the principle of Cuius regio, eius religio, requiring Christians to follow their ruler's version of Christianity, and it must have seemed that the experiment of reformation had ended.

== Religious policy of Queen Elizabeth I ==
Mary's Protestant half-sister, Queen Elizabeth I, succeeded in having Parliament pass another Act of Supremacy in 1559. The Act of 1534 had declared the English crown to be 'the only supreme head on earth of the Church in England' in place of the Pope. Any act of allegiance to the Papacy was considered treasonous because the Papacy claimed both spiritual and political power over its followers.

Additionally, the Irish Act of Uniformity, passed in 1560, made worship in churches adhering to the Church of Ireland compulsory. Anyone who took office in the Irish church or government was required to take the Oath of Supremacy; penalties for violating it included hanging and quartering. Attendance at Church of Ireland services became obligatory – those who refused to attend, whether Catholics or Protestant nonconformists, could be fined and physically punished as recusants by the civil powers. Initially Elizabeth tolerated non-Anglican observance, but after the promulgation in 1570 of the Papal Bull, Regnans in Excelsis, Catholics were increasingly seen as a threat to the security of the state. Nevertheless, the enforcement of conformity in Ireland was sporadic and limited for much of the sixteenth century.

The issue of religious and political rivalry continued during the two Desmond Rebellions (1569–1583) and the Nine Years' War (1594–1603), both of which overlapped with the Anglo-Spanish War, during which some rebellious Irish nobles were helped by the Papacy and by Elizabeth's arch-enemy Philip II of Spain. Due to the unsettled state of the country Protestantism made little progress, unlike in Celtic Scotland and Wales at that time. It came to be associated with military conquest and colonisation and was therefore hated by many. The political-religious overlap was personified by Adam Loftus, who served as Archbishop and as Lord Chancellor of Ireland.

The bulk of Protestants in Ireland during Elizabeth's reign were confined to the ranks of new settlers and government officials, who formed a small minority. Amongst the native Gaelic Irish and Old English, recusancy pre-dominated and was tolerated by Elizabeth for fear of alienating the Old English further. To them, the official state religion had already changed several times since 1533, and might well change again, as Elizabeth's heir until 1587 was the Catholic Mary, Queen of Scots.

Elizabeth established Trinity College Dublin in 1592, partly in order to train clergy to preach the reformed faith. In 1571, a Gaelic printing typeface was created and brought to Ireland by dignitaries of St. Patrick's Cathedral, Dublin, to print documents in the Irish language for the purposes of evangelisation. The liturgy that was intended to be printed was to be used for the preaching in Irish in specially appointed churches in the main town of every diocese. The first translation of the New Testament into Irish was done in 1603, and a translation of the Gospels was sponsored by Richard Boyle.

== Religious policy of King James I ==
The reign of James I (1603–25) started tolerantly, and the Treaty of London (1604) was signed with Spain, but the Gunpowder Plot in 1605 caused him and his officials to adopt a harder line against Catholics who remained in the majority, even in the Irish House of Lords. So few had converted to Protestantism that the Catholic Counter-Reformation was introduced in 1612, much later than in the rest of Europe, typically marked by the Council of Trent, convened in 1545. The Flight of the Earls in 1607 led on to the Plantation of Ulster, but many of the new settlers were Presbyterian and not Anglican; reformed, but not entirely acceptable to the Dublin administration. The settlers allowed James to create a slight Protestant majority in the Irish House of Commons in 1613.

The work of translating the Old Testament into Irish for the first time was undertaken by William Bedell (1573–1642), Bishop of Kilmore, who completed his translation within the reign of Charles I, although it was not published until 1680 in a revised version by Narcissus Marsh (1638–1713), Archbishop of Dublin. Bedell had undertaken a translation of the Book of Common Prayer published in 1606.

In 1631, the Primate James Ussher published A Discourse of the Religion Anciently Professed by the Irish and British, arguing that the earlier forms of Irish Christianity were self-governing, and were not subject to control by the Papacy. Ussher is more famous for his hypothesis, on the basis of Biblical date calculations, that the earth must have been created on 22 October 4004 BC.

== Policies of Commonwealth and Restoration regimes ==
The final stage was marked by the Irish Rebellion of 1641 by those groups of the Irish nobility that continued in their loyalty to the crown, Catholicism, or both. The Cromwellian conquest of Ireland in 1649–53 briefly introduced Puritanism as the state religion. The Restoration period that followed and the brief reign of the Catholic James II were characterised by unusual state tolerance for religions in their kingdoms. During the Patriot Parliament of 1689, James II – despite remaining Catholic – refused to abolish his position as head of the Church of Ireland, so ensuring that Protestant bishops attended its sessions.

In the Williamite War in Ireland that followed, absolutism was destroyed, but the majority of the population felt more conquered than ever. The Irish parliament introduced a series of "Penal Laws" with the ostensible purpose of displacing Catholicism as the majority religion. However, there was no consistent attempt by the Protestant Ascendancy to actively convert the bulk of the population to Anglicanism, which suggests that their main purposes were economic – to transfer wealth from Catholic hands to Protestant hands, and to persuade Catholic property owners to convert to Protestantism.

An Irish translation of the revised Book of Common Prayer of 1662 was effected by John Richardson (1664–1747), and was published in 1712.

Despite the Reformation's association with military conquest, the country produced outstanding philosophers who were Anglican Irish writers, some of whom were Church of Ireland clergy, such as James Ussher, Archbishop of Dublin later Primate of Ireland; Jonathan Swift, priest; John Toland, essayist, philosopher and free thinker; George Berkeley, bishop. The Presbyterian philosopher Francis Hutcheson (1694–1746) had a notable impact in Colonial America.

== See also ==
- Second Reformation (England and Ireland)
- History of Ireland (1536–1691)
- Protestant Ascendancy
- Protestantism in Ireland

== Bibliography ==
- Blaney, Roger; Presbyterians and the Irish Language. Ulster Historical Foundation, 2012. ISBN 978-1-908448-55-2.
- Connolly, S.J.; Oxford Companion to Irish History. Oxford University Press, 2007. ISBN 978-0-19-923483-7.
- Duffy, Seán (2002). The Illustrated History of Ireland. New York: Contemporary Books. ISBN 0-8092-2437-2.
- Duffy, Seán; Medieval Ireland An Encyclopedia. Routledge, 2005. ISBN 0-415-94052-4.
- Duffy, Seán; The Concise History of Ireland. Gill & Macmillan, 2005. ISBN 0-7171-3810-0.
- Gilbert, John (1854). A History of the City of Dublin. Oxford: Oxford University.
- Ronan, Myles (1926). The Reformation in Dublin 1536–1558. London: Longmans, Green and Co.
- Why the Reformation failed in Ireland by Cambridge University Press
