= Presbyterian paraphrases =

Traditional Presbyterian church songs

For the linguistics definition, see paraphrase.
For the paraphrases by Erasmus of the New Testament, see Paraphrases of Erasmus.
For the medieval Biblical literary genre, see Biblical paraphrase.

Paraphrases are traditional forms of singing within Presbyterian churches. They are biblical paraphrases: lyrical renderings of sections of the Bible that have been set to music, in a similar fashion to metrical psalms.

== Usage ==
Within a Presbyterian Hymnbook, the Paraphrases are usually printed in a separate section from Psalms and Hymns. Within the Church Hymnary Revised Edition of the Presbyterian Hymnbook there are 67 Paraphrases. The Irish Presbyterian Hymnbook (2004) includes 66 Paraphrases along with 150 Psalms of the Irish Psalter and a further 669 hymns and song.

Traditional churches generally sing a Paraphrase, a Psalm and a number of hymns within worship.

In recent decades many congregations have moved from traditional Paraphrases to modern settings of Bible passages to music, in the same way that modern settings of Psalms are often used. This is due to the often archaic language that the Metrical Psalms and Paraphrases use.
