= David Clarke (minister) =

David Clarke was Moderator of the Presbyterian Church in Ireland from 2006 to 2007.

David Clarke was born in Ballymena on 2 September 1946 and graduated from Queen's University, Belfast with degrees in Law and then Divinity. From 1970 until 1974 Dr Clarke was the assistant minister at Bloomfield Presbyterian Church in Belfast before accepting a call to Templepatrick. Six years later in 1980 he became minister of Terrace Row congregation in Coleraine with a membership of some 450 families.

Receiving the support of 14 of the 21 presbyteries in Ireland, Dr Clarke was a popular choice to be Moderator of the General Assembly. During his moderatorial year his theme was "Serving Christ, Serving Others". That year Dr Clarke also published a book, Page Ten, comprising articles from his local weekly newspaper column, sales of which were donated to the Bible Society's work in Egypt.

In the autumn of 2011 David Clarke made known his intention to retire as minister of Terrace Row on 31 January 2012. His latest book The Sat Nav Gospel, including the full texts of some twenty sermons and addresses over the years at Terrace Row, was published before his retirement.

Presbyterian Church titles
Preceded by Robert Ernest Henry Uprichard (2005)	Moderator of the Presbyterian Church in Ireland; 2006	Succeeded by John Mateer Finlay (2007)
