= Presbyterian Mutual =

Failed mutual society based in Belfast, Northern Ireland

The Presbyterian Mutual Society, also known as Presbyterian Mutual, is a Belfast-based mutual society with around 9.500 investors, most of whom are members of the Presbyterian Church in Ireland.

The society has been put into administration after a run on the society in October 2008 when £21 million of its £25 million reserves were withdrawn. Presbyterian Mutual had lent heavily to the commercial property developers and the buy to let sector. The loss of funds was attributed to the fact that commercial banks had their deposits guaranteed, in contrast to the Mutual's unguaranteed status. The then Minister for Employment and Learning, Sir Reg (now Lord) Empey, amongst others, called for the Treasury to compensate investors. The Treasury subsequently set up a Working Group to consider what action could be taken.

Gordon Brown talked with Northern Ireland's political leaders on its future on February 12, 2010.

In October 2010 George Osborne announced a £200 million payment to compensate savers as part of the Comprehensive Spending Review. The final bill came to £232 million, and the first cheques for repayment were sent on 2 August 2011. Around 10,000 people were affected by the collapse.

As of 2021, the Society's administrators (supervisors) declared that they would be unable to secure full repayment of the 175 million pounds due, and so investors with outstanding monies due would not receive them back. All savers who invested less than £20,000 have been more or less fully compensated but those with higher amounts were left with deficits of 15 to 23%.
