= Reformed Presbyterian Church of Ireland =

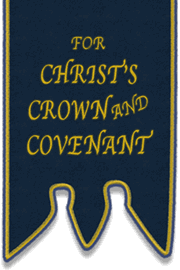
- The "Blue Banner"
- Classification: Protestant
- Orientation: Calvinism
- Polity: Presbyterian
- Region: Ireland
- Members: 1,800 per 2023 synod reports.

The Reformed Presbyterian Church of Ireland is a Covenanting church in Ireland.

In 2024, the church had forty-two congregations, of which thirty-two were located in Northern Ireland; the remaining ten were located in the Republic of Ireland. As of 2011, its total communicant membership was 1,952. The distribution of Reformed Presbyterians accords with the distribution of the Ulster Scots, with most congregations based in counties Antrim, Londonderry and Down. Several new congregations have, however, been formed recently in the Belfast area, along with fellowships in Galway, Limerick and Dublin.

== History ==
The church's roots date back to the 17th-century plantation of Ulster by Scots Presbyterian settlers. When the Revolution Settlement was entered into in 1690 following the victory of William III in the Williamite War, a minority of Presbyterians refused to subscribe, claiming its failure to specifically recognise the kingship of Jesus Christ was a departure from the Solemn League and Covenant of 1643. These dissenters, or Covenanters, began to hold separate meetings from the mainstream Presbyterians. The Ulster branch of the denomination was dependent on visits from Scottish ministers until 1757.

A separate Irish presbytery was organised in April 1763, and its synod was constituted at Cullybackey on 1 May 1811.

== Doctrine and practice ==
Being a member church of the RP Global Alliance and part of the Reformed Presbyterian Church, the RPCI conforms to the following:

- Westminster Confession of Faith
- Westminster Larger Catechism
- Westminster Shorter Catechism
- The testimony of the Reformed Presbyterian Church of Ireland which contains a very short article outlining the two points where the RPCI disagrees with Westminster Confession of Faith, followed by fourteen short essays on points of 'practical application' which are essentially facets of Christian living on which the RPCI has a theological opinion. Some such essays relate to the relationship between church and state, how it understands its relationship to Catholicism, or what it thinks about membership of the secret societies.

In practical terms, the Reformed Presbyterian Church is known by several distinct practices, particularly in only singing psalms and not having any musical accompaniment. There is also a strong emphasis on Christian doctrine, including the sacredness of the Lord's Day, along with other RPCI beliefs.

The RPCI has a theological college in south Belfast which trains preachers for the RPC and the EPC. The RPCI has a bookshop at the same site. The denomination runs residential accommodation in Ballymoney for elderly people. It also offers accommodation near Queen's University for students and young people.

The RPCI is involved in mission work around the world, including France, Spain, Sudan and Japan.

The Covenanter Witness magazine is published each month.

== See also ==
- Reformed Presbyterian churches
- Reformed Presbyterian Church of Scotland
- Evangelical Presbyterian Church
- Free Presbyterian Church of Ulster
- Non-subscribing Presbyterian Church of Ireland
- Presbyterian Church in Ireland
