= James E. Davey =

Northern Irish Presbyterian minister (1890–1960)

James Ernest Davey (1890–1960) was a Northern Irish Presbyterian minister, historian, and theologian who was acquitted on charges of heresy in 1927 and elected Moderator of the General Assembly of the Presbyterian Church in Ireland in 1953.

== Education ==
Davey was born on 24 June 1890 in Ballymena, Co. Antrim, the eldest child of the Rev Charles Davey, a Presbyterian minister, and his wife, Margaret. When Ernest was one the family moved to Belfast. He attended both Methodist College Belfast and Campbell College before graduating in 1912 from King's College, Cambridge.

== Theologian and historian ==
From 1917 until his death in 1960 he was on the staff of the Presbyterian college, in Belfast, variously occupying the four chairs of church history; biblical literature and Hellenistic Greek; Hebrew and Old Testament; and New Testament language, literature, and theology.

Academic offices
| Preceded by James Heron | Professor of Church History of the Presbyterian Church in Ireland; 1917-1922 | Succeeded by Francis J Paul |
| Preceded by Matthew Leitch as Professor of Biblical Criticism | Professor of Biblical Literature and Hellenistic Greek of the Presbyterian Church in Ireland; 1922-30 | Succeeded by David Smith as Professor of New Testament Interpretation and Homiletics |
| Preceded by Thomas Walker as Professor of Hebrew | Professor of Hebrew and Old Testament of the Presbyterian Church in Ireland; 1930-33 | Succeeded by Hugh Alexander Irvine as Professor of Old Testament Language, Literature and Theology |
| Preceded by David Smith as Professor of New Testament Interpretation and Homiletics | Professor of New Testament Language, Literature and Theology of the Presbyterian Church in Ireland; 1933-1960 | Succeeded by Edward Augustine Russell as Professor of New Testament Language, Literature and Theology |
| Preceded by Francis James Paul | Principal of Assembly's College, Belfast; 1942-1960 | Succeeded by James Loughridge Mitchell Haire |
Presbyterian Church titles
| Preceded by John Knox Leslie McKean (1952) | Moderator of the Presbyterian Church in Ireland; 1953 | Succeeded by John Knowles (1954) |
