= Golden Rule (fiscal policy) =

The Golden Rule is a guideline for the operation of fiscal policy. The Golden Rule states that "over the economic cycle, the government will borrow only to invest and not to fund current spending". In layman's terms, this means that on average over the ups and downs of an economic cycle the government should only borrow to pay for investment that benefits future generations. Day-to-day spending that benefits today's taxpayers should be paid for with today's taxes, not with leveraged investment. Therefore, over the cycle the current budget (i.e., net of investment) must balance or be brought into surplus.

The core of the 'golden rule' framework is that, as a general rule, policy should be designed to maintain a stable allocation of public sector resources over the course of the business cycle. Stability is defined in terms of the following ratios:

1. The ratio of public sector net worth to national income
2. The ratio of public current expenditure to national income
3. The ratio of public sector income to national income.

If national income is growing, and net worth is positive this rule implies that, on average, there should be net surplus of income over expenditure.

The justification for the Golden Rule derives from macroeconomic theory. Other things being equal, an increase in government borrowing raises the real interest rate consequently crowding out (reducing) investment because a higher rate of return is required for investment to be profitable. Unless the government uses the borrowed funds to invest in projects with a similar rate of return to private investment, capital accumulation falls, with negative consequences upon economic growth.

The distinction between current and investment spending can incentivize creative accounting.

== In the United Kingdom ==
The Golden Rule was one of several fiscal policy principles set out by the incoming Labour government in 1997. These were first set out by then Chancellor of the Exchequer Gordon Brown in his 1997 budget speech. Subsequently, they were formalised in the Finance Act 1998 and in the Code for Fiscal Stability, approved by the House of Commons in December 1998.

In 2005 there was speculation that the Chancellor had manipulated these rules as the treasury had moved the reference frame for the start of the economic cycle to two years earlier (from 1999 to 1997). The implications of this were to allow for £18 billion – £22 billion more of borrowing.

The government's other fiscal rule is the Sustainable investment rule, which requires it to keep debt at a "prudent level". This is currently set at below 40% of GDP in each year of the current cycle.

Between 2009 and 2021, the Golden Rule in the United Kingdom was abandoned, however after the October 2021 budget speech by Rishi Sunak the Golden Rule was restored.

Although the United Kingdom does not use the term "golden rule" anymore, the government does still use fiscal rules. They dictate that the budget should be balanced or in surplus by 2029–30, net financial debt should fall as a share of the economy by 2029–30, and that welfare should stay below a certain level.

== In France ==
In France, the lower house of parliament voted in favour of reforming articles 32, 39 and 42 of the French constitution on 12 July 2011. In order to come into force the amendments need to be passed by a three fifths majority of the combined upper and lower houses (Congress).

== In Germany ==
In 2009, articles 109, 115 and 143 of Germany's constitution were amended to introduce the Schuldenbremse ("debt brake"), a balanced budget provision. The reform will come into effect in 2016 for the state and 2020 for the regions.

== In Spain ==
On 7 September 2011, the Spanish Senate approved an amendment to article 135 of the Spanish constitution introducing a cap on the structural deficit of the state (national, regional and municipal). The amendment came into force from 2020.

== In Italy ==
On 7 September 2011, the Italian Lower House approved a constitutional reform introducing a balanced budget obligation to Article 81 of the Italian constitution. The rule will come into effect in 2014. That reform is rooted in the European Stability and Growth Pact and in the s.c. fiscal compact. It has led to the abandonment of the ideological neutrality that characterised the Italian fiscal constitution in favour of a clearly neoclassical inspiration.

== See also ==
- Balanced Budget Amendment
