= Sustainable investment rule =

United Kingdom financial management

The sustainable investment rule, as referred to in the United Kingdom, is one of several fiscal policy principles set out by the incoming Labour government in 1997.

== History ==
These were first set out by then Chancellor of the Exchequer Gordon Brown in his 1997 budget speech. Subsequently they were formalised in the Finance Act 1998 and in the Code for Fiscal Stability, approved by the House of Commons in December 1998.

The sustainable investment rule states that public sector net debt as a proportion of gross domestic product (GDP) will be held over the economic cycle at a stable and prudent level. The Chancellor has stated that, other things being equal, net government debt will be maintained below 40% of GDP over the current economic cycle.

This "rule" is however merely a stated aim with no sanctions against the incumbent government if broken, unlike some balanced budget provisions used in other countries.

The sustainable investment rule is the counterpart to the Golden Rule, introduced at the same time.
