= Union Theological College =

College in Belfast, Northern Ireland

Coordinates: 54.585°N 5.931°W

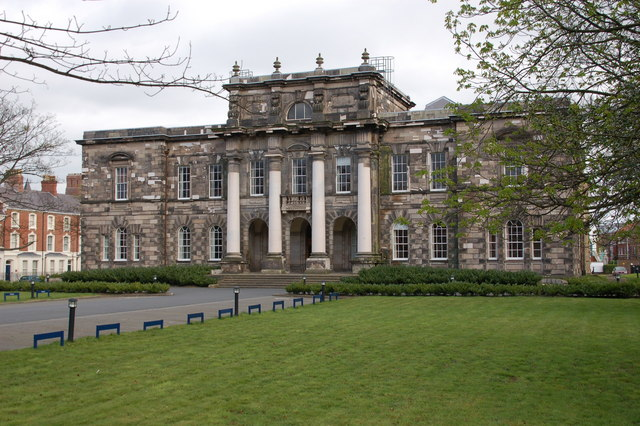
- Motto: Latin: "Veritatem eme et noli vendere"
- Motto in English: "Buy the truth and sell it not" (taken from Proverbs 23:23)
- Established: 1853; 173 years ago (Assembly's College)
- Affiliations: Presbyterian Church in Ireland
- Academic affiliations: Queen's University Belfast (1926-2021); St Mary's University, Twickenham (1921- )
- Principal: Michael McClenahan
- Location: 108 Botanic Avenue, Belfast, Northern Ireland
- Website: union.ac.uk

Union Theological College is the theological college for the Presbyterian Church in Ireland and is situated in Belfast, Northern Ireland. It is governed by the Council for Training in Ministry. It has been responsible for training people for ministry in the Presbyterian Church in Ireland and also runs courses open to the wider public, including distance learning courses offered through BibleMesh.

The professors of the college constitute the Presbyterian Theological Faculty of Ireland (PTFI) which holds a Royal Charter to award postgraduate degrees.

- Undergraduate degrees are awarded by St Mary's University, Twickenham, but teaching is carried out at the college.
- Postgraduate teaching is provided in collaboration with BibleMesh.
- Doctoral studies are supervised in collaboration with Kirby Laing Centre for Public Theology in Cambridge and Davenant Hall.

The majority of ministers and deaconesses for the Presbyterian Church in Ireland are trained at the college, but the church also recognises training at an unspecified number of "recognised colleges" elsewhere.

== History ==
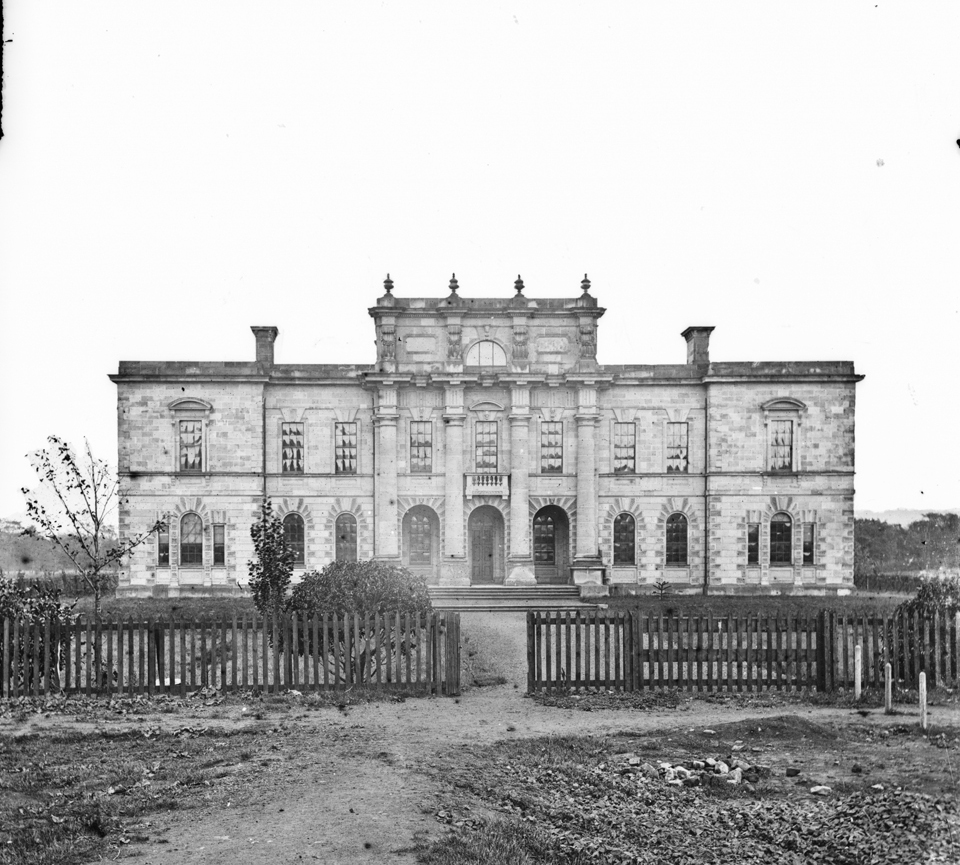
The building, circa 1860-1880.

=== The Assembly's College ===
The college was founded in 1853 as the Assembly's College. The Renaissance Revival style building with its grand Doric porch and Baroque attic was designed by Sir Charles Lanyon, the architect of the main building at Queen's and built with Scrabo stone at a cost of £5,000. Merle d'Aubigné of Geneva participated in the opening ceremony on 5 December 1853 alongside Henry Cooke, President of the Faculty (the five other professors in the new college were John Edgar, Robert Wilson, William Killen, James G. Murphy and William Gibson).

There was a large influx of students in the wake of the 1859 Revival and the south wing with its dining hall and student accommodation ("Chambers") was added in 1869. Princeton seminary had an important influence in the shaping of the ethos of the college during this period: the Rev. Robert Watts who was appointed Professor of Systematic Theology in 1866 hoped to make "Belfast another Princeton". The north wing with its wood-panelled chapel was designed by John Lanyon, son of original architect, and completed in 1881. The first degrees under the royal charter were conferred in 1883. However, the death of Watts in 1895 marked the beginning of the end of the Princetonian influence. A partial union took place between the faculties in Belfast and Magee in 1922.

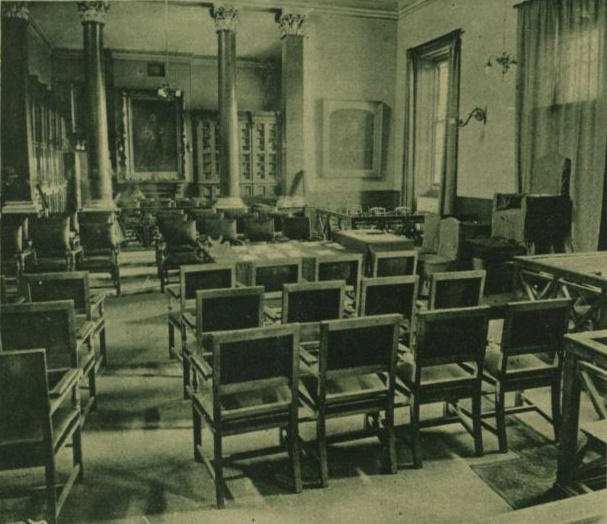
The Commons.

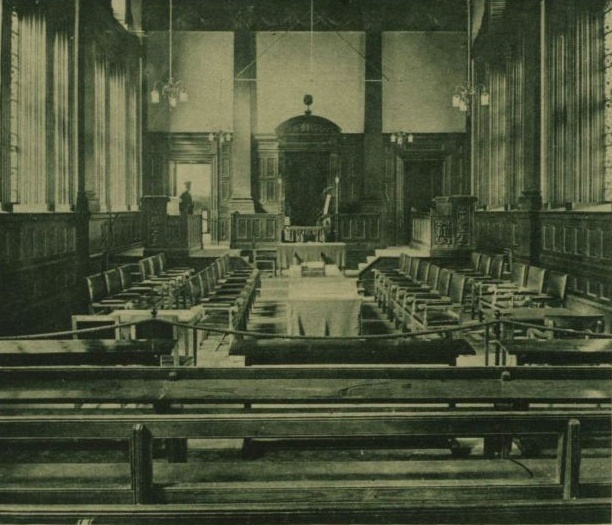
The Senate.

The newly formed Parliament of Northern Ireland met in the Assembly's College from 1921 until 1932 while Stormont was being built: the Commons met in the Gamble Library and the Senate in the college chapel. During this period the college conducted classes in a house and provided library resources in a house on University Square.

In 1926 the college became a Recognised College of Queen's University but the college then came under criticism for its embrace of theological liberalism. This culminated in a charge of heresy being brought against Professor J. Ernest Davey in 1926-27 and a heresy trial in 1927 because of his teaching in the College. The five charges were summarised in the minutes of the General Assembly as follows:

1. The first charge alleges that Professor Davey denies that 'God pardoneth all our sins and accepteth us as righteous in His sight, only for the righteousness of Christ imputes to us.'
2. The second charge alleges that Professor Davey taught what is contrary to Holy Scripture concerning the absolute perfection of our Lord's character.
3. The third charge alleges that Professor Davey taught what is contrary to the Word of God and the Westminster Confession of Faith regarding the inspiration, infallibility, and Divine authority of Holy Scriptures,
4. The fourth charge alleges that Professor Davey taught what is contrary to the doctrine that 'the sinfulness of all sins proceedeth only from the creature and not from God.'
5. The fifth charge alleges that Professor Davey held and taught that the doctrine of the Trinity is not taught in the Word of God.

Although cleared by the Church's courts, a small number of Presbyterians broke away unhappy with the decision and founded what later became the Evangelical Presbyterian Church.

The college officially reopened in October 1932 and the inaugural lecture was delivered by the Scottish Historian Robert Rait. Between 1941 and 1948 the city police used the college as its own headquarters were bombed in the Belfast Blitz. In 1953, to mark the College's centenary year, Prof. Davey was elected Moderator of the General Assembly.

=== The Union Theological College ===
Union Theological College of the Presbyterian Church in Ireland Act 1978
- Act of Parliament
- Parliament of the United Kingdom
- Long title: An Act to provide for the establishment of The Union Theological College of the Presbyterian Church in Ireland; to declare the trusts upon which the property of The Union Theological College of the Presbyterian Church in Ireland shall be held; to make provision for the management and operation of The Union Theological College of the Presbyterian Church in Ireland; to provide for the transfer of the assets and liabilities of The Presbyterian College, Belfast, and the Magee Theological College, Londonderry, to the Trustees of The Union Theological College of the Presbyterian Church in Ireland; and for other purposes.
- Citation: 1978 c. v

Dates
- Royal assent: 30 June 1978

Text of statute as originally enacted

In 1976 theological teaching at Magee College in Derry ceased and the two colleges amalgamated in 1978. The new college, constituted by an act of Parliament, the Union Theological College of the Presbyterian Church in Ireland Act 1978 (c. v), was named the Union Theological College. John M. Barkley was Professor of Church History from 1954 until his retirement in 1981 (Principal 1976-1981) and was succeeded by Finlay Holmes (Principal 1987-1992). Laurence Kirkpatrick was subsequently appointed Professor of Church history in 1996 (Principal 2008-2010).

In 2003 the college celebrated its 150th anniversary by completing a £2.8million pound refurbishment in which individual study bedrooms with ensuite facilities were added. Alister E. McGrath, Professor of Historical Theology at the University of Oxford gave a public lecture entitled "Renewing our vision for the future of Protestant Christianity in Northern Ireland". Bill Addley retired as Professor of Practical Theology in 2006 and the vacated chair was filled by Drew Gibson. Cecil McCullough, Professor of New Testament, who served as Principal from 1998 to 2002, retired in 2007 and was succeeded in the chair by Gordon Campbell.

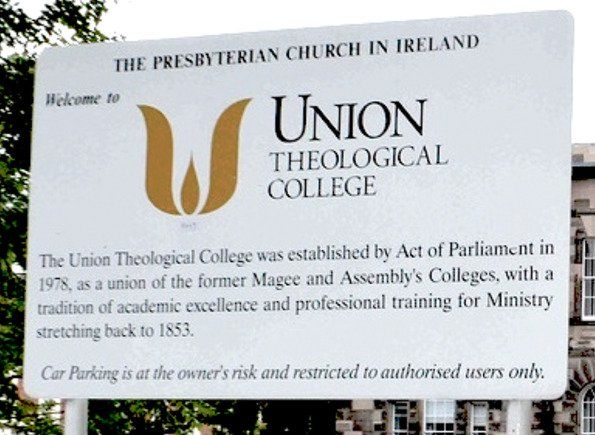
Sign formerly visible outside Union Theological College, displaying previous logo and brief details of history.

On 14 November 2009 a fire caused serious damage to the rear of the college during the refurbishment of the Principal's House (a £2.2million project). The extension known as the Training Resource Centre, providing further lecture and seminar rooms, was subsequently opened in September 2011. Stafford Carson was appointed as a new executive principal in 2013. At this time a major stonework restoration and conservation project took place (2013-2017). Patton Taylor retired as Professor of Old Testament in 2016 (Principal 2002-2008 and 2010-2013).

In 2017 the college marked the 500th anniversary of the Reformation by participating in a "Luther 500" conference and by hosting an autumn seminar series entitled "The Unfinished Reformation". The Welsh Presbyterian theologian Stephen N. Williams, who had held the Chair of Systematic Theology from 1994, was succeeded in 2017 by Michael McClenahan.

In 2018 there was "a refresh of the College's Coat of Arms" with the help of a digital heraldic artist, including discussion of the motto to "buy the truth and sell it not". The shield of this coat of arms was then incorporated into a new logo, featuring two drinking horns above a burning bush. The logo was changed again in 2022, emphasising the year of the college's foundation but removing the motto.

==== Breaking of links with Queen's University Belfast ====
In 2016, Queen's University Belfast undertook a strategic review of the teaching of Theology as all new undergraduate students were then taught at Union Theological College, noting decline in the overall number of students studying theology at the four Theological Colleges, and expressing concerns regarding the diversity of provision compared to Theology and Religions departments in other UK Universities, while also highlighting "excellent student satisfaction rates" and recommending that future plans include "as many aspects of its current undergraduate provision via UTC as possible (community-mindedness, well-cared for student body, a fine library and library culture, and a real sense of the scholastics in ministry)." The review also raised concerns about a lack of diversity in the faculty, noting that "there are now no full-time female members of staff teaching on the undergraduate programmes" and that the full-time teaching staff "are all male and from a Presbyterian background", with a requirement that they "be committed to working within the Christian ethos and doctrinal framework of the Presbyterian Church in Ireland". It was also noted that any Professorial appointment must be an ordained minister in the Church, or eligible to become such.

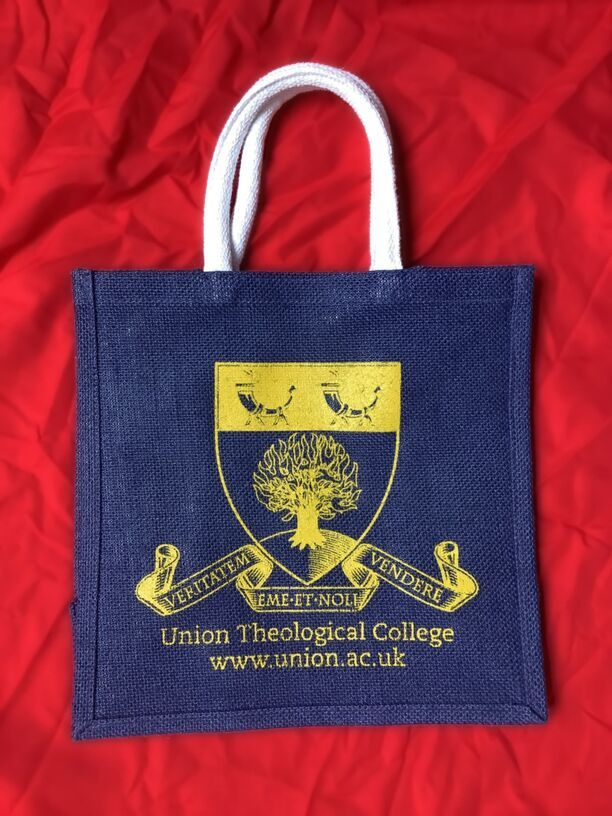
Promotional jute bag for Union Theological College, displaying the logo previously in use from 2018 to 2022.

In 2018 the Professor of Church History was controversially suspended pursuant to his participation in a radio interview. A subsequent QAA report that was described by journalists as "highly critical" expressed concerns regarding "weakness in the college's maintenance of academic standards", with "the potential to put academic standards and quality at risk". However the QAA themselves in a subsequent report in 2021 highlighted the good standard of teaching and achievement in the college despite the pressure of Covid, saying "Students are clear about how assessment is organised and how assessments have been graded. The College describes the 2019-20 cohort's achievement as commendable with, of the 41 students who graduated, seven achieving a first-class honours degree (17%), 31 a 2.1 (76%) and three a 2.2 (7%). Those figures compare favourably to the previous five years." and "External examiners have commented favourably on the teaching and learning support provided to the students during the pandemic and have confirmed the standards and comparability of awards."

In 2019, Queen's University Belfast Senate approved a recommendation from the Academic Council regarding the Institute of Theology, with the result that the University would no longer offer Theology degrees, ending its relationship with all four Theological Colleges in the Institute of Theology, including Union Theological College. As tuition fees for 2018/19 were set at £4,160 annually, the projected annual financial shortfall to the college was estimated to be as high as £700,000 on the assumption that over 150 undergraduate students might normally be admitted in a given year. While student numbers enrolled in the colleges of the Institute of Theology had declined significantly in latter years, numbers in the College had seen a smaller decrease, from 264 in 2012 to 233 in 2017. It was subsequently argued that the immediately foreseeable shortfall in the absence of any new income streams would be £250,000 by 2022.

Until 2021, the college had provided teaching and assessment for undergraduate and postgraduate awards offered through the Institute of Theology at Queen's University Belfast. Whereas a wider range of modules was offered to students in the past, previously including a "Graduate Certificate in Youth Ministry programme", the range of available modules had latterly been restricted "for reasons of financial viability". In its 2021 report the QAA stated that "the College acknowledged that offering a full range of modules has been difficult to resolve for reasons of financial viability. It was further recognised by the senior team and staff, that greater and better use could be made of PTFI student representatives. However, students are largely satisfied with the variety of both formal and informal feedback mechanisms and described tutors as attentive and helpful."

==== Dismissal of a professor ====
The Professor of Church History and former principal, Laurence Kirkpatrick, was suspended from teaching pursuant to remarks on BBC Radio Ulster's Talkback programme in June 2018, and subsequently dismissed by the college in 2019, after 22 years of teaching, as aspects of his radio interview were judged to constitute "gross misconduct." Specifically, a church disciplinary panel held that a statement about same-sex relationships which was not aligned with the doctrinal position of the professor's employer was a serious breach of discipline, as was a failure to defend the college's reputation when its link to Queen's University Belfast was questioned. A letter from the disciplinary panel highlighted his contribution to the Talkback programme on 13 June 2018 which allegedly "brought Union Theological College and ... the Presbyterian Church in Ireland into disrepute." The letter reportedly stated that he had "failed to gain the church's approval for taking part" in the interview, publicly disagreed with "the doctrinal position of [his] employer", and "made no attempt to defend the college's reputation." Of particular contention, the former Professor of Church History responded to a hypothetical question during the Talkback interview "if there was a practising gay student in a class on Christian ethics, what would I feel if they were being told they were indulging in a sinful practice" by stating that he personally "would be horrified".

The sacking of the professor prompted media coverage and public criticism, not just locally but also internationally. In particular, the dismissal prompted public debate about academic freedom in the college and the freedom of ministers in the church to disagree with church policy and was reported to be a factor in the decision by Queen's University to review the nature of its relationship with the College. Former Presbyterian ministers who had previously left to pursue other careers, Richard Hill (who left in 2008) and Roy Simpson (who left in 1980) accused the church of "stifling public debate," and Ian Hazlett, Emeritus Professor of Theology and Religious Studies at the University of Glasgow, where he had supervised Professor Kirkpatrick's doctoral studies, said that the "semi-secret plotting" that led to "Laurence Kirkpatrick's dismissal from his academic post by non-academic churchmen reminded him "in some respects of the Inquisition." Trevor Gribben, Clerk of the General Assembly disputed these claims in an interview on BBC Radio Ulster's Sunday Sequence, saying "people are free to debate in public, it is the nature of that discourse that is important … When we speak about one another and to one another, particularly as Christians, we need to do that in courteous and constructive ways."

Professor Kirkpatrick threatened "to sing like a canary" and took a case to the employment tribunal alleging victimisation, unlawful discrimination and unfair dismissal, which the church refused to recognise.

In 2025 it was reported that the Professor had "settled a case taken against a Presbyterian-run college" and that the Church "reached a confidential settlement." One paper claimed to have "seen an agreed statement on the resolution of the long-running case involving the church and Professor Kirkpatrick" which said "Since that time both parties have been unable to reach a consensus in relation to these allegations" and "In the interests of all concerned, the parties have now resolved the litigation and reached a confidential resolution, without admission of liability by the church, actual or implied."

==== New partnerships in the post-Queen's era ====
Following the breaking of links with Queen's University, teaching for postgraduate degrees is delivered in partnership with the international institution, BibleMesh, and the degrees are awarded by the Presbyterian Theological Faculty Ireland.

In 2020 Union Theological College announced it would partner with the Roman Catholic St Mary's University, Twickenham for the awarding of undergraduate degrees. The General Assembly was not able to meet in 2020 to discuss the proposed partnership due to COVID-19 but the members of the Assembly authorised a Standing Commission to conduct business on its behalf. The Presbyterian Church addressed potential concerns about degrees from a Presbyterian college being validated by a Catholic university which is committed to the mission of the Catholic Church in higher education by saying that "It's a validation arrangement, with the college still being able to retain its reformed and evangelical identity, which will be respected by St Mary's, who will continue with their Catholic identity - but we'll both share a Christian ethos and the values that we share with all Christians. That is an important new development for Union College and it's a positive sign for the new Northern Ireland where such sectarian divisions are perhaps a thing of the past."

The Presbyterian Theological Faculty of Ireland had been granted a Royal Charter in 1881 to confer postgraduate academic degrees. A Supplemental Charter was granted in 2021 to modernise the original charter.

In February 2022, it was announced that the college would be working with the Kirby Laing Centre for Public Theology in Cambridge to develop a cohort of supervisors who will supervise PhD studies for the college.

A further collaboration was announced in January 2023 between Union Theological College and the Davenant Institute's Davenant Hall. Students in Davenant Hall's M.Litt. degree program will now have the opportunity to continue their studies at the Ph.D. level at Union Theological College, while still being supervised by Davenant Hall faculty. It was announced that to facilitate this, five of Davenant Hall's leading instructors (Matthew Hoskin, Joseph Minich, Bradford Littlejohn, Michael Lynch, and Alastair Roberts) would join the faculty of Union Theological College to supervise Ph.D. research within their fields of expertise.

Arrangements have also been made with Crosslands Training to further develop the College's PTFI doctoral programme,.

== Faculty ==
The faculty currently comprises two professors respectively leading extant academic departments, a "non-academic" Professor of Ministry, a senior lecturer in Biblical Studies, a lecturer in Historical Theology, a lecturer in New Testament and a lecturer in Practical Theology. Prof. W. Gordon Campbell became principal of the college in 2021 and was succeeded in this role in 2023 by Prof. Michael McClenahan.

=== Notable faculty ===
- Dr T. Desi Alexander (Senior Research Fellow in Biblical Studies)
- Dr Martyn C. Cowan (Lecturer in Historical Theology)

=== Notable former faculty ===
- Prof. Henry Cooke (d. 1868)
- Prof. Robert Watts (d. 1895)
- Prof. J. Ernest Davey (d. 1960)
- Prof. Finlay Holmes (d. 2008)
- Prof. Stephen N. Williams (Professor Emeritus of Systematic Theology)
- Principal J. Stafford Carson (former Principal and Professor of Ministry)

== Notable alumni ==
- Ray Davey, founder of the Corrymeela Community
- William Crawley, Northern Irish journalist and broadcaster
- Pádraig Ó Tuama, Irish poet, theologian and conflict mediator
- Noble McNeely, moderator of the Presbyterian Church in Ireland (2017-2018)
- David Clarke, moderator of the Presbyterian Church in Ireland (2006-2007)

== Library ==
Founded in 1873 by Mrs Caroline Gamble in memory of her late husband, the Rev. Henry Gamble (not to be confused with an Anglican priest of the same name), the college Library is the largest theological library in Northern Ireland. The Gamble Library stocks over 65,000 books, 20,000 pamphlets and taking over 50 journals and periodicals. The domed library served as the Chamber of the House of Commons for the Northern Ireland Parliament from 1921 to 1932. The foundation of the collection predates the college and was formed in 1845. A significant collection was acquired from the estate of the Presbyterian historian Rev. James Seaton Reid (d. 1851). Much of the Magee College pamphlet collection was added in 1977.

== See also ==
- Category:Academics of Union Theological College, Belfast

Preceded by Belfast City Hall	Home of the Parliament of Northern Ireland; 1921 – 1932	Succeeded by Parliament Buildings (Northern Ireland)
