= Second Reformation (England and Ireland) =

1820s evangelical campaign

The Second Reformation was an evangelical campaign from the 1820s onwards, organised by theological conservatives in the Church of Ireland and Church of England.

== History ==
Evangelical clergymen were known as "Biblicals" or "New Reformers". The Second Reformation was most zealously prosecuted in Connacht where it was encouraged by Thomas Plunket, 2nd Baron Plunket, the Anglican Bishop of Tuam, Killala and Achonry. Opposition in the west was led by the Roman Catholic Archbishop of Tuam, John MacHale. The movement endeavoured (unsuccessfully) and in ecumenical terms disastrously, to proselytise amongst the Roman Catholic population of Ireland, frequently by highly dubious means in which material benefits were offered as a reward for conversion. The occasion of the Great Famine (Ireland) was also seized upon by the "new Reformers". To get food, starving Catholics were obliged to apply to the work house of the local Poor Law union. Conversion was expected upon admittance. Quaker and Irish politician Alfred Webb later wrote:

"Upon the famine arose the wide spread system of proselytism ... and a network of well-intentioned Protestant associations spread over the poorer parts of the country, which in return for soup and other help endeavoured to gather the people into their churches and schools... The movement left seeds of bitterness that have not yet died out, and Protestants, and not altogether excluding Friends, sacrificed much of the influence for good they might have had..."

Conversions exacted under the duress of those circumstances were often not long lived as the convert may not have been acting out of personal conviction.

"At the time those families who took the "soup" became known for generations as "soupers" after the Famine many re-converted back to being Roman Catholics and in turn they became known as "jumpers", so one could have the "souper Doyles" or "souper Murphys" and later, after the famine was over, the "jumper Doyles or "jumper Murphys".

The Second Reformation was also opposed by moderates in the Church of Ireland. It petered out during the 1860s.
