= Presbyterian Church in Ireland =

Protestant denomination in Ireland

- Modern logo of the Presbyterian Church in Ireland
- Classification: Protestant
- Orientation: Presbyterian
- Theology: Reformed
- Polity: Presbyterian
- Moderator: Richard Murray
- Associations: World Communion of Reformed Churches
- Region: Ireland
- Origin: 1610
- Branched from: Church of Scotland
- Congregations: 519
- Members: 200,000
- Official website: www.presbyterianireland.org

The Presbyterian Church in Ireland (PCI; Irish: Eaglais Phreispitéireach in Éirinn; Ulster-Scots: Prisbytairin Kirk in Airlann) is the largest representative in Ireland of the Scottish reformed tradition of Christianity. Drawing on the liturgy and confession of the 17th-century Scottish Kirk, the Church, until the 19th century, contended with the disabilities imposed on "dissent" from the Anglican communion of the established Church of Ireland. After a series of secessions and re-alignments, the Church emerged in the 20th century as the largest Protestant denomination in Northern Ireland.

Sharing in the general decline of Christian church attendance, and marked this century by divisions on abortion and same-sex marriage, the Church, by its own estimates has seen a 50 percent decline in membership from a peak in the early 1970s. The Church suggests that it has "around 185,000" members, including nine to ten thousand in the Republic of Ireland.

The Church's "500 plus" congregations are represented by their ministers (both men and women, active and retired) and by a ruling Elder, on its governing body and highest court, its annual General Assembly.

== History ==
=== 17th century ===
==== Scottish settlement and the Six Mile Water Revival ====
Presbyterianism in Ireland dates from Scottish participation in the Plantation of Ulster at the beginning of the 17th century. Lowland Scots were settled as tenants on lands appropriated in the wake of the scorched-earth Nine Years War by officers and undertakers of the King of England. Weavers and small commodity farmers, they brought with them their own ministers, some of whom were recognised and even ordained by Church of Ireland bishops.

Tensions with the established church and with the vice-regal administration in Dublin grew when, in response to a "spiritual awakening", these ministers began holding monthly meetings at Antrim Castle, on the Six Mile Water. From 1625, with scant reference to church doctrine, the preaching of James Glendinning at Carrickfergus on the wrath of God and the terrors of sin had triggered a movement of religious conversion. People were described as being "slain in the Spirit", some appearing to collapse or fall into a trance-like state, and to experience physical convulsions. Deliberating together, ministers would exercise "discernment" in evaluating these manifestations of what some believed was the Holy Spirit, and others the work of Satan.

The Six Mile Water assemblies, which continued until at least 1634, fostered among the newly arrived Lowland settlers a sense of "community and shared religious experience". This was reinforced by the arrival of Covenanters driven across the North Channel by the Crown's attempt to force episcopacy upon the Scottish Kirk. Dublin responded in 1639 by demanding of all Scots in Ulster over the age 16 the so-called Black Oath: a repudiation of the Kirk's National Covenant and a pledge of loyalty or obedience to the King.

In 1642, a further Presbyterian wave followed the army of Robert Monro, whose chaplains established Ireland's first presbytery at Carrickfergus. Monro had been commissioned by the Scottish Parliament, and once landed by the English Parliament, to put down the Irish Catholics waging war against the British settlers who had displaced them.

==== Westminster Confession ====
In 1643, the Scots, in a Solemn League and Covenant promised English parliamentarians aid in their escalating war with the King on the understanding that they would abandon episcopalianism, and bring the church both in England and in Ireland into conformity with "reformed" standards of doctrine and worship. In 1646, this produced the Westminster Confession of Faith. While its systematic exposition of Calvinist theology became (and remains) the subordinate standard of doctrine in the Church of Scotland, in the English legislation significant provisions, including the articles on church synods and councils, were omitted. Following Pride's Purge, in January 1649 Charles Stuart (who had opened negotiations with the disappointed Scots, Monro among the "Engagers") was executed and, a role for the state in religious practice was (in principle) abandoned.

In Belfast, the presbytery issued a remonstrance decrying the execution of the King and accusing the Rump Parliament of seeking to establish by law a universal toleration of all religions. Framing the response from London, John Milton denounced the Scots in Ulster as "ungrateful and treacherous guests", and charged their "unchristian synagogue" in Belfast with seditious libel. In September 1649, Cromwell dispatched a force north from Drogheda who, taking Belfast in a four-day siege, expelled the offending Presbyterians from the town.

==== Dissenters ====
In the wake of the Williamite victory in 1691, the presbyteries of Ulster convened their first General Synod. An immediate task was the distribution among ministers of a regium donum, a royal stipend first granted in acknowledgement of Presbyterian support for the Stuart Restoration in 1660. Despite the mark of Royal favour, under the newly-codified Protestant Ascendancy, Presbyterians remained "Dissenters" from approved communion. Its tests of conformity excluded them from public office, and its tithe-levying clergy retained exclusive authority to certify their marriages and, hence, the legitimacy of their children.

=== 18th Century ===
==== Emigration ====
In summer of 1718, several hundred Presbyterians were led by their ministers aboard a fleet (the "Five Ships of Ulster") that departed for New England from Derry and Coleraine. During the next two years, 2,600 followed and, in the half century until passage was disrupted by the American War of Independence, it is estimated that as many as a quarter of a million crossed to the American colonies (this at a time when the Presbyterian population of Ulster was not above half a million). For the home church, the scale of departure was unsettling. The confusion was compounded by reports of a "Great Awakening" in which, in a seeming reprise of the Six Mile Water Revival, their emigrant brethren were abandoning traditional liturgy and confession in favour of the greater emotionalism of outdoor gatherings and personal witness.

There was also alarm in Dublin at the abandonment of Ulster by Protestants, and at the subsequent growth of the American-inspired Volunteer movement. There were concessions: in 1780, the Test Act was repealed; in 1782, Parliament recognised the legitimacy of marriages celebrated by Dissenting clergy; and in 1784 one thousand pounds was added to Regiun Donum of the Synod of Ulster.

==== Subscription controversy ====
In 1719, the Rev. John Abernethy of Antrim, published an address to a group of young clergy, the Belfast Society, under the title Religious Obedience based on Personal Persuasion. Taking issue with what he described as "servile notions of ecclesiastical power . . . attended with confusion and fear", and taking as his text Romans 14:5, "Let every man be fully persuaded in his own mind", Abernethy argued that no confession of faith could be framed from which Christian sincerity and human reason could deny a right of dissent.

In a response, Personal Persuasion no ground for Religious Obedience, Rev. John Malcolme of Dunmurry charged Abernathy with innovation. A "New Light" was being followed that, in questioning the authority of Christ's church, must lead to the anti-Trinitarian denial of his divinity. Abernethy insisted on the essential orthodoxy of his position, but his implicit challenge to the Westminster Confession was brought to a head a year later when, on being installed at the First Church in Rosemary Street, Belfast, Rev. Samuel Halliday refused to Subscribe. Others followed his example, some calling themselves Old Presbyterians as a reminder to their critics that, until the General Synod began to insist upon the Confession, presbyteries had licensed ministers without any requirement to Subscribe to Calvinist doctrine or to any creedal statement "apart from the Bible".

In 1725, the Synod had the Non-Subscribers (sixteen ministers and congregations) form into one Presbytery, the Presbytery of Antrim, with which it then proceeded to sever communion ties. While the Non-Subscribing Presbytery of Antrim maintained its formal independence, its members were not consistently excluded from Synod proceedings. For its centenary celebrations in 1791, the General Synod minutes listed the ministers of the Presbytery on its roll.

==== Seceders ====
Not all Subscribers were satisfied with measures taken to uphold Calvinist doctrine. Following arguments advanced by latter-day Covenanters in Scotland, they suggested that in accepting a regium donum, the church had failed in its Confessional duty to maintain the "Kingship of Christ". The payment to its ministers was the price for capitulating to a religious settlement in which prelacy had been not denounced as "accursed of God", nor Presbytery declared as "of Divine right". In the 1740s and 50s, a number of congregations began to withdraw from the General Synod, but separately along lines reflecting divisions among seceders in Scotland. These included Burghers and Anti-Burghers (heirs to a dispute in Scotland over whether "the true religion" to be upheld in the oaths required of town Burgesses could be read as that of the Seceders themselves, or had to be rejected as that of the established Kirk) and Reformed Presbyterians (commonly known in Ireland as Covenanters, and who in contrast to their fellow seceders were never to accept a regium donum)). Each sect was, in time, to form its own presbytery and synod.

==== The "democratic party" ====
In the absence of a Presbyterian seminary in Ireland, candidates for the ministry were typically educated at the University of Glasgow. There they were exposed to the teaching of the Ulster divine, "Father of the Scottish Enlightenment", Francis Hutcheson. Enlarging on Abernethy's defence of personal conscience and individual inquiry, Hutcheson proposed that, the doctrine of original sin notwithstanding, men have an innate moral sense and a natural inclination toward fellowship. This gives them claim to unalienable rights and to their collective defence against oppressive government. Carried across the Atlantic, these were ideas that stiffened the resolve of the patriots in the colonies (the "Scotch-Irish" prominent among them), and affirmed by the declarations, first of Independence in America, and then of the Rights of Man and the Citizen in France, they returned to Ireland in the patriotic resolutions of the Volunteers and of the societies of United Irishmen.

After the United Irish risings in 1798, the General Synod resisted a government attempt to wrest control of the distribution of the regium donum, and to condition its payment to ministers on proofs of their loyalty. The Chief Secretary for Ireland, Lord Castlereagh was reacting to what he perceived as a "democratic party in the [Ulster] synod, most of whom, if not engaged in the Rebellion, were deeply infected with its principles".

No more than about twenty Presbyterian ministers and probationers were directly implicated in the insurrectionary movement (of whom two were executed). But the call to expunge " bigotry in religion and policies", and to seek an "equal distribution of the Rights of Man through all Sects and Denominations of Irishmen", had had an appeal beyond the New Light congregations whose members had been to the fore in establishing the first United society in Belfast. These included some of those who, bowing to "no king but Jesus", had held themselves aloof from political contention. In county Antrim, thousands filled fields to hear the itinerant Reformed preacher William Gibson prophesy – in the tradition that had seen the disestablishment of the Catholic Church in the French Republic as a defeat for the Antichrist – the "immediate destruction of the British monarchy". On the pages of the United Irish paper, the Northern Star, Gibson was joined by Thomas Ledlie Birch of Saintfield, a Subscribing member of the General Synod, in anticipating the "overthrow of the Beast".

=== 19th Century ===
==== Union and Catholic emancipation ====
The General Synod initially protested proposals to secure Ireland through a legislative union with Great Britain. But once it was clear that this was the fixed policy of Crown, there was little appetite for argument. Few were persuaded that the Ascendancy parliament was worth the price of opposition.

The Synod did petition the government after the 1800 Acts of Union failed to deliver what Castlereagh had suggested would be a final act of Catholic Relief. The new United Kingdom Parliament had retained the excluding oaths of abjuration. In 1813, 139 members of the Synod resolved in favour of Catholic claims, and called for the removal of all civil disabilities on account of religious opinion. When, in 1829, a government bill for emancipation was finally presented, an otherwise commanding figure within the Synod, Henry Cooke (newly installed in a church specially built for him in May Street, Belfast), failed in his attempt to have a special meeting called in defence of the Protestant constitution. This was despite Cooke having split, on theological grounds, the majority who were against him on the question of confessional privilege.

==== Arian controversy ====
The occasion was the seminary education, provided for the first time in Ireland, in the collegiate section of a school that had been founded on a non-denominational basis (Fr. William Crolly, the future Roman Catholic Archbishop of Armagh, was among the subscribers). Lord Castlereagh perceived "a deep laid scheme again to bring the Presbyterian Synod within the ranks of democracy". The Belfast Academical Institution was the conception of William Drennan, author of the original United Irish pledge or test, and the son of Rev Thomas Drennan of Belfast First Presbyterian, a close disciple of Hutcheson.

In 1822, Cooke revived Malcombe's charge against Abernethy. He attacked the Belfast Institution as a "seminary of Arianism". Cooke's principal target, Rev Henry Montgomery, conceded that he and other ministers associated with the school were, indeed, non-trinitarians, allowing Cooke to attack them as heretics. At the General Synod in 1827, Montgomery made plea for liberty of conscience (of which there was a print-run of 30,000 copies), but the trinitarian faith of the Subscribing church was confirmed, and the following year the General Synod carried Cooke's motion for a committee to examine theological orthodoxy of future ordinands.

==== Creation of the General Assembly ====
The dispute contributed to an organisational realignment of the broader church. In 1830, Montgomery and his supporters (seventeen ministers and their congregations, all but one from the Protestant-majority areas east of the Bann) withdrew into their own Remonstrant Synod. In 1835, this joined with the Presbytery of Antrim and the much smaller Synod of Munster (which had never subscribed to the Westminster Confession) in the Association of Irish Non-Subscribing Presbyterians. Later, in 1910, the coalition was consolidated as the Non-subscribing Presbyterian Church of Ireland (NSPCI).

Meanwhile the General Synod, purged of its Unitarian tendencies, was able to make common cause with older Seceders (Burgher and Anti-Burgher). In 1840, their Act of Union created the General Assembly of the Presbyterian Church in Ireland (PCI). In 1853, the Assembly established its own Subscribing, Trinitarian seminary, Assembly College, today's Union Theological College.

==== Home Missions and the Ulster Revival of 1859 ====
The first Moderator of the General Assembly, in 1840, was Rev. Samuel Hanna of the 3rd Presbyterian, Belfast. Hanna had himself taught at the Belfast Institution, and while a strict trinitarian, he was not among those who insisted on full subscription to the Westminster Confession. He was distinguished rather as a supporter from 1827 of the Presbyterian Missionary Society that sought to match the ambition of Church of Ireland "Biblicals" or "New Reformers" in renewing the spirit of evangelism and in proselytising among Catholics. In this, Hanna was supported by Henry Cooke who urged upon missionaries the use of Irish. In the famine years of the 1840s, this "home" missionary effort elicited charges of Souperism.

Hanna's colleague and later successor, Rev. William Gibson, promoted the second-wave, more exclusively Presbyterian, Ulster Revival in 1859. While Gibson emphasised the participation of "respectable" elements, he conceded that "the ordinary Belfast convert was a female textile hand", and in parts of the country the movement appears to have been spread independently by the daughters of weavers and small farmers. Preceded by reports of a second Great Awakening in North America, the Revival reproduced many of its more spectacular elements: all-night prayer meetings, speaking in tongues, and episodes of choreomania and leaping. While the PCI, following Gibson, had been broadly supportive of the movement, increasingly these "excesses"were condemned as "doctrinal, liturgical, ecclesiological, and moral aberrations".

The emphasis in both the New Reformation and the Revival on "personal conversion", on choosing "God's grace" (for Presbyterians, a challenge for the Confessional doctrine of Predestination), had transcended the theological differences between the Protestant denominations. It also launched them into "a far more conscious sense of separateness from the Roman Catholic Church", then undergoing its own devotional revolution.

==== Protestant unity ====
In 1834, at a Conservative demonstration called by Lord Roden at Hillsborough, Cooke published what he described as "the banns of a Christian marriage" between the two main Protestant denominations. Setting aside their doctrinal differences, Presbyterians and Anglicans would cooperate on all "matters of common safety". Presbyterians should acknowledge the established status of Church of Ireland as a bulwark of the "Protestant Constitution" (Cooke ranked himself not as a Dissenter, but as a minister of "a branch of the Church of Scotland"), and should unite with Anglicans in opposing Daniel O'Connell's gathering campaign for a repeal of the union, a prospect that, in the wake of belated Catholic Relief Act of 1829, must produce in Ireland a Catholic-majority parliament.

The General Assembly elected Cooke as its Moderator for 1841, but it did not rally to his call. Rather than throw their support behind the Ascendancy's Conservative and Orange candidates, in 1843 the Assembly urged its members to secure the return of Presbyterian representatives to Parliament. In protest, Cooke formally withdrew from the Assembly and did not return until the resolution was rescinded in 1847.

Presbyterian voters found Liberals more responsive to their agrarian grievances (on which many of their ministers were active campaigners). It is only after these were addressed, and only once Irish nationalists, holding the balance of power at Westminster, succeeded in committing Liberals to Irish Home Rule, that Cooke's vision of pan-Protestant unionism was realised. In 1869, the levying of tithes atop the landlord's rent ceased with the disestablishment of the Church of Ireland--as did payment to the PCI of the regium donum. Beginning in 1880, Irish Land Acts, resolved the issues of tenure in favour of the tenant farmer. Bought out on his behalf by the government, the landowning, largely Anglican, gentry were retired.

After a second Home Rule bill was introduced in 1892, an Ulster Unionist Convention in Belfast demonstrated a broad Protestant unity. As reported by the Northern Whig, among the 12,300 delegates attending there were "the old tenant-righters of the 'sixties' ... the sturdy Reformers of Antrim ... the Unitarians of Down, always progressive in their politics ... the old-fashioned Tories of the Counties ... modern Conservatives ... Orangemen ... All these various elements—Whig, Liberal, Radical, Presbyterian, Episcopalian, Unitarian and Methodist ... united as one man."

=== 20th century ===
Ulster Covenant

When a third Home Rule Bill was introduced in 1912, the PCI publicly aligned with Ulster Unionist Council. On 28 September 1912, "Ulster Day", Edward Carson and Lord Londonderry led the Council in signing Ulster's Solemn League and Covenant at Belfast City Hall. In affirming their readiness to use "all means which may be found necessary to defeat the present conspiracy to set up a Home Rule Parliament in Ireland", they were immediately followed, as first of the several Protestant church leaders, by the Moderator of General Assembly, Rev. Henry Montgomery (not to be confused with his earlier Arian namesake), the Clerk of the General Assembly, Rev. W. J. Lowe also signing.

When it had met earlier in the summer, the General Assembly had declined to vote on a Home Rule motion (the views of the membership had been "expressed elsewhere"). Just over a third its of members declined, or failed, to follow the Moderator's example in signing the Covenant, but Rev. J. B. Armour, a veteran of the Tenant Right campaign of the 1870s, was among the very few to make his reservations public. In October 1913, as the Unionists began to drill their Ulster Volunteers, he helped organise a "Protestant protest" against "Carsonism" in Ballymoney The Times of London was able to conclude that, overshadowed by the scale of a unionist rally in the town weeks later, the meeting had represented but a "small pocket of dissident Protestants, the last survivors of the Old Liberals.”

==== Opposition to secular and mixed education ====
Following partition in 1921, the devolved legislature for the six Ulster counties remaining, as Northern Ireland, within the United Kingdom convened in Assembly College. It continued to do so until the opening of the Parliament Buildings at Stormont in 1932.

In an early intervention with the new parliament, the Presbyterian Church protested a 1923 Education Act. Consistent with the obligation under the Government of Ireland Act to neither establish nor endow a religion, the Act provided that in education authority schools there should be no religious criteria in hiring teachers and no denominational religious instruction during school hours. The Minister, Lord Londonderry, acknowledged that his ambition was to see Protestant and Catholic children educated in the same schools. The PCI joined with other Protestant denominations in demanding guaranteed Bible instruction and a continuation of their role in school governance. In 1930, the Act, which was also opposed by the grant-assisted Catholic school sector, was amended so that the statutory "Christian ethos" of public ("controlled") schools was defined, in effect, as Protestant.

Fifty years later, against the background of violent communal conflict, the General Assembly did endorse the idea that there might be an "integrated" third sector: schools in which Catholic and Protestant parents might choose to have their children educated together.

==== Overseas missions and women's enfranchisement ====
In addition to its Home Mission, the PCI developed commitments to education, evangelism, and social service overseas. These foreign missions included, from 1841 India (where the PCI retains links with the Church of North India), and Manchuria (northeast China) from 1869 until foreign missionaries were expelled in the early 1950s.

Women were at the forefront of this missionary effort. Church historian, Rev Trevor Morrow, suggests that for every 10 missionaries going abroad, on average seven were women. Mission stations were being manned by women who "were doing what they could not do at home": they were "preaching, pastoring and in some cases overseeing congregations".

This, together with the leadership Presbyterian women were demonstrating at home in Christian Temperance and other social and political movements, forms part of the context for the decision of the General Assembly in 1926 to enfranchise women. It bowed to the view that just as there are no biblical and theological reasons to bar women from elective office in the state, there are none to disqualify them from voting and being elected to office in the church. The Assembly resolved: “That women shall be eligible ... as ruling elders on the same conditions as men.”

In 1973, the Assembly approved women for full congregational ministry, but there was resistance. In 1990 the church allowed those who have "personal conscientious reservations or objections to this policy on the basis of their reading of the Scriptures" to absent themselves from the ordination of female members. The first woman to be ordained was the Rev. Ruth Patterson in 1976. This made her the first woman in any denomination to be ordained in Ireland. The first woman to be ordained in the Non-Subscribing Presbyterian Church in Ireland was in 1982.

==== The Troubles ====
According to a study the PCI itself commissioned in 2019, Considering Grace: Presbyterians and the Troubles by Gladys Ganiel, during the three decades of sustained communal and political violence from the late 1960s, "the Troubles", the Assembly avoided potentially contentious commentary and initiative. Local ministers were often in the role of "first responders": identifying bodies and sitting with grieving families, and some were to engaged with Catholic priests to build bridges across the communal divide. One their Catholic interlocutors, Fr. Des Wilson, noted that such initiatives tended to be "clobbered" by Protestant evangelists, and notably by Ian Paisley.

Paisley, who had training at the Reformed Presbyterian Theological Hall in Belfast, and from 1951 had been the leader off his own "Bible Protestant" Free Presbyterian Church of Ulster, had long criticised the PCI for a lack of sufficient zeal in denouncing the errors of the Catholic church. With the other mainline Protestant churches, he suggested the PCI was being led down a "Roman road" by the Irish Council of Churches. Treading, as he believed, the path of the "greatest son" of Irish Presbyterianism, Dr. Henry Cooke, Paisley suggested that an evangelical truce with the Catholic Church amounted to a "policy of treachery".

In 1965, before the onset of the Troubles, Rev. Ray Davey, the first Presbyterian Chaplain and Dean of Residences at Queen's University, Belfast, and the minister who was to succeed him in that position, John Morrow, founded the Corrymeela Community. Committed to intercommunal understanding and reconciliation, it subsequently received international recognition for its efforts to promote dialogue between loyalist and republican paramilitaries and their supporters.

In 1974, Rev. Jack Weir, who was then clerk to the General Assembly, "defied widespread criticism and hostility from the Unionist community" in helping broker a short-lived ceasefire with the Provisional IRA. He served as Moderator in 1976, and in 1979 led a Presbyterian delegation to meet Pope John Paul II, during his visit to Ireland. In the 1990s, he again "defied public hostility, and engaged in further talks and contacts in a bid to bolster the fledgling peace process".

Evolution of Presbyterian churches connected to the Presbyterian Church in Ireland

== The Church today ==
=== Governance ===
Congregations are governed, in the first instance, by their Kirk Session, a court comprising both men and women in the role either of ordained ministers ("teaching Elders") or of elected lay Elders. Several congregations form a Presbytery, a local area court, of which there are currently 19. These handle, inter alia, the ordination, installation, transfer, and pastoral care of ministers, as well as overseeing vacant congregations by appointing a minister-in-charge (convener).

According to the 1840 Act of Union between the synods, "the highest ecclesiastical power upon earth, acknowledged by the Presbyterian Church, is the Presbytery. The General Assembly is therefore not higher than a Presbytery in power, claimed or exercised; but merely, as being a larger Presbytery, is entitled to exercise an equivalently larger jurisdiction; and as being the common council of the Churches. is, therefore, entitled to have the final cognisance of all common concerns".

All congregations are represented in the Church's General Assembly, which normally meets annually during the first full week in June. Every minister and every retired minister is a member, and every congregation sends one lay elder. Women's and youth organisations, deaconesses and sister churches are also entitled to send delegates, giving a total membership of around 1,300 delegates.

The sitting Assembly first installs a new Moderator of the Presbyterian Church in Ireland, who acts as a presiding officer for the rest of the session. After the Assembly rises at the end of the week, the Moderator spends much of the rest of the year as its ambassador.

The headquarters of the church are at Assembly Buildings, Fisherwick Place, Belfast, which were extensively renovated as part of a multimillion-pound project in 2010–2012. The Presbyterian Church in Ireland was a founding member in 1922 of the Irish Council of Churches and in 1970 of the World Alliance of Reformed Churches. The church's two nineteenth-century theological colleges, Magee College (Derry) and Assembly's College (Belfast), merged in 1978 to form Union Theological College in Belfast. Union offers post-graduate education to the denomination's candidates for the full-time ministry.

=== Membership ===
In 2015, the General Assembly acknowledged that church membership had dropped 40% since 1975, from an historic peak of 375,000 to 230,000 attending 545 congregations. The last, 2021, Northern Ireland census, identified the PCI as the church of 316,103 people. It is not clear how "membership" is defined, but, in 2026, the Church itself was reporting an all-Ireland total of "around 185,000 members across 500-plus congregations".

These numbers concentrate in the north-east, in Belfast and its hinterlands in counties Down and Antrim. The smaller congregations in the Republic of ireland (accounting for perhaps 5% of the total membership) are found largely in the border counties and in Dublin.

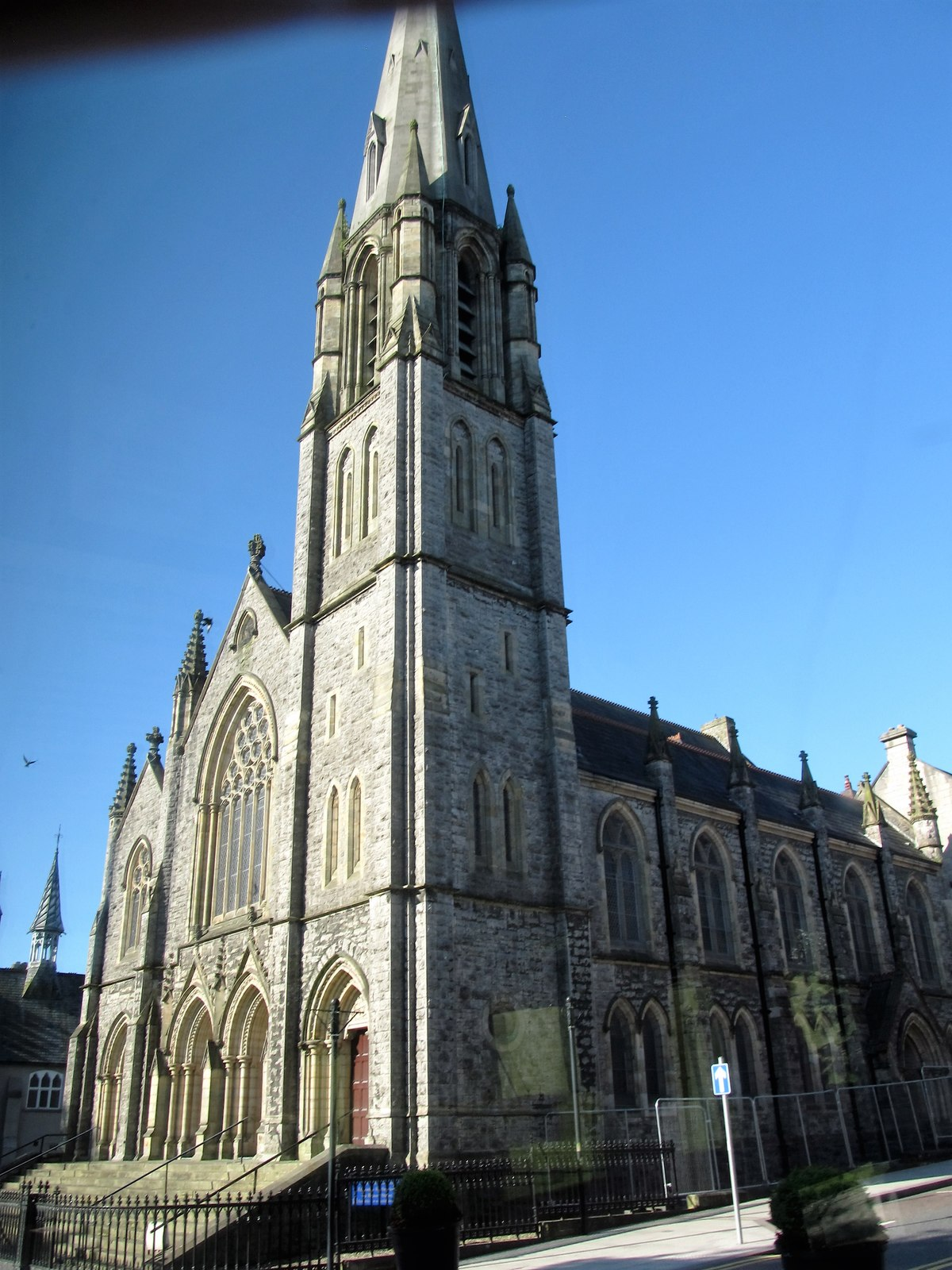
First Presbyterian Church, Armagh

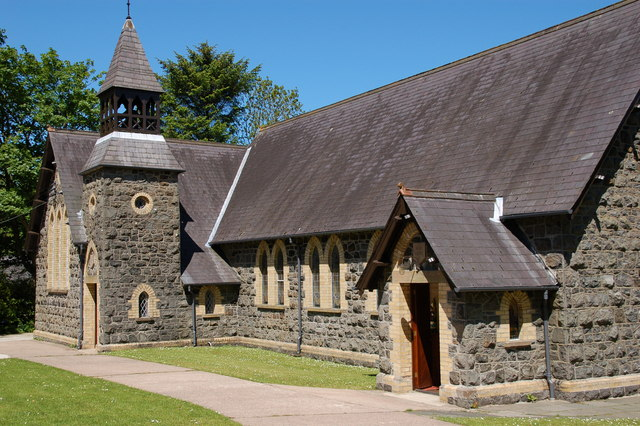
Magheramorne Presbyterian Church

=== Liturgy ===
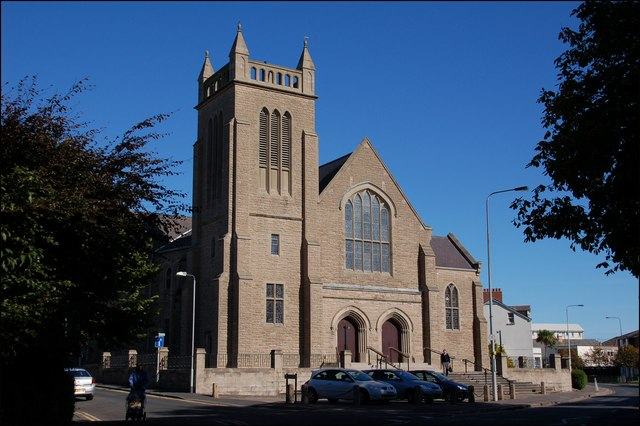
Hamilton Road Presbyterian Church, Bangor

==== Meeting house ====
Apart from the seats for worshippers, the inside of a Presbyterian church building (often called the meeting house) is dominated by four items of furniture.

- The Pulpit is the place from which sermons are preached. It generally occupies the central place in the church, reflecting the central place of the proclamation of the Word of God in the worship of the Church.
- The Lectern, or Bible Stand, holds the Bible in a prominent place in the church. The Bible is the source of all authority in the life of the church.
- The Communion Table is often placed directly in front of the pulpit. The associated chairs are occupied by the minister and elders during the service of Holy Communion.
- The Baptismal Font is used during baptisms.

==== Service ====
Presbyterianism is confessionally tied to what is known as the 'regulative principle of worship' which teaches that only that which is commanded in scripture should be done in worship. According to chapter 21 of the Westminster Confession of Faith a service of worship includes, reading the bible, a sermon on a selected passage or passages, (this being the central element in the Presbyterian Church's services), along with prayer and singing. The order all these things take place in the service varies from congregation to congregation.

In recent years, the singing of hymns has almost exclusively taken over from what was usual in the past, which was the singing of psalms and paraphrases. At the turn of the last century, many Irish presbyterian congregations also moved from singing without being accompanied by musical instruments to the use of them and now most if not all Presbyterian churches use a variety of instruments but nearly always a piano or guitar, many still have a traditional organ as well.

Along with these aspects, many churches will also have a section of public announcements, a time to give money to the church, and often, a talk designed especially for children. Other elements found less regularly are, a time of explicit doctrinal teaching using one of the church's two catechisms or confession of faith, the celebration of one or both of the churches two sacraments baptism and the Lord's supper, an interview of some person in a Parachurch organization or who does some role in the church, usually for free but sometimes paid, a vow ceremony whereby teenagers or adults become communicant members and very rarely ordinations of elders or ministers.

=== Logo and motto ===
The motto of the Presbyterian Church in Ireland is Ardens sed Virens– "burning but flourishing". It is usually seen alongside the Burning Bush, the church's symbol. A burning bush was included in the more modern logo (top).

According to the Bible, in Exodus 3:2, Moses heard the voice of God coming from a burning bush that was not consumed by fire. This occurred after he had to flee Egypt, and was when he was called to go and demand the release of the Israelites.

== Contemporary issues ==
=== Female ordination ===
Fifty years after the Assembly approved women for full congregational ministry, the ordination of women was challenged by a Moderator designate. In 2023, Rev. Dr Sam Mawhinney of the Adelaide Road Church, Dublin, made known that he objected to the ordination of women. Other ministers also made public statements proposing that only men are qualified by Scripture in the roles of teaching and ruling elder.

In response, the general secretary of the church, Rev. Trevor Gribben, affirmed that the settled position of the General Assembly remains that "both men and women can apply to be students for the ministry, trained in our college and become eligible to be ordained as full ministers of the Presbyterian Church in Ireland". However, he also noted that this is an issue on which the PCI accepts conscientious dissent: "the church permits those who genuinely and sincerely differ from its position to hold a different personal view".

Within the PCI, there is a growing interest in "complementarity", the idea that women’s role in the church, as defined in Scripture, is "complementary’" to men, but not necessarily equal.

Rev. Ruth Patterson OBE, who in 1976 was the first woman ordained in the PCI, was twice nominated as Moderator, but the General Assembly has yet to elevate a woman to that position.

=== Child safeguarding ===
Since November 2025 the Presbyterian Church has faced a significant and ongoing safeguarding crisis after an internal report revealed "serious and significant failings" in its handling of child protection matters between 2009 and 2022. In 2025, these failures prompted the resignation of the denomination's Moderator, Rev Dr Trevor Gribben, who stepped down after acknowledging the extent of the safeguarding breakdowns. In the aftermath, the Police Service of Northern Ireland (PSNI) launched a criminal investigation into the Church's safeguarding practices. Additionally, the Charity Commission for Northern Ireland opened a statutory inquiry to examine systemic issues, including inadequate record‑keeping and failures to protect vulnerable individuals across the Church's structures.

=== Abortion ===
On life issues, the denomination opposes abortion except for when the woman's life is in danger, and maintained "total opposition" to the liberalisation of Northern Ireland's abortion laws. The General Assembly professed itself to be "deeply disappointed" when this was inserted in Westminster legislation: the Northern Ireland (Executive Formation) Act 2019.

On this, and on other matters, there are members (including past Moderators) who, while supporting the majority position, emphasize the principle of individual conscience under Scripture. While the General Council issues moral guidance and may urge specific actions (such voting in the 2018 referendum in the Republic of Ireland to retain the anti-abortion Eighth Amendment to the Constitution), it does not legally or coercively dictate what individual members must profess..On the question of same sex marriage, however, there was less ambiguity.

=== Same-sex marriage ===
In June 2006, the General Assembly voted to prohibit its ministers from blessing same-sex relationships. In 2015, it voiced its opposition to the legalisation of same-sex marriage.

In June 2018, the Assembly debated and adopted a report of its Doctrine Committee, ruling that anyone in a same-sex relationship cannot be a full member of the Church. The Committee stated that:

In light of our understanding of Scripture and the Church’s understanding of a credible profession of faith, it is clear that same sex couples are not eligible for communicant membership, nor are they qualified to receive baptism for their children. We believe that their outward conduct and lifestyle is at variance with a life of obedience to Christ.

The outcome of this debate was controversial among the church's members, and several ministers spoke out against the adoption of any formal rules. It also led to several resignations; notable Presbyterian elder, Lord Alderdice, announced his resignation in protest, and later wrote a book on the subject of tolerance. When a minister of Whitehead Presbyterian, Ian Carton, resigned three years later, he partially attributed his decision to the 2018 decision of the General Assembly. An open letter was published by newspapers from 232 members of the church, including many ministers, elders, and one former Moderator of the Church Assembly, entitled "A Cry from the Heart", addressing the "profound sense of hurt" the church had inflicted on its LGBT members.

Earlier in the year, the church voted to cut its ceremonial ties with the Church of Scotland with a vote of 255 to 171, after that church took steps towards letting its ministers preside at same-sex marriages. At the behest of the Assembly, its Moderator had for several years declined to attend Church of Scotland's meetings, in protest against its acceptance of gay relationships.

In September 2019, the PCI dismissed Steven Smyrl as an elder of Christ Church, Sandymount, Dublin, after he had contracted a same-sex civil marriage. Following an appeal, it subsequently ruled Smyrl's minister, Rev Katherine Meyer, had breached the Church’s laws and teachings on sexuality by refusing to recant her decision to support Smyrl, as had their kirk session in voting to re-instate him as an elder. The response from the media and several congregations was highly critical, with an editorial in The Irish Times describing the church as being on "the road to irrelevance". When, in 2024, the PCI's Judicial Commission ruled that Meyer had failed to "yield submission in the Lord to the courts of the Church"; she decided to resign from her ministry.

=== Education ===
Together with the two other major Protestant denominations on the Controlled Schools Support Council (CSSC), the Church of Ireland and Methodist Church, the PCI nominates over 1,800 governors to serve on the boards of controlled schools in Northern Ireland. Controlled schools remain "church-related schools" because, beginning in the 1930s, the Protestant churches transferred their school buildings, pupils and staff into state control on the understanding that the (Protestant) "Christian ethos" of these schools would be maintained in perpetuity.

Fifty years after agreeing in principle to the creation a third Integrated schools sector, PCI remains, both with its partners in the Controlled Council and with the Catholic Church on the Council for Maintained Schools, broadly opposed any transfer of resources. In 2022, in an open letter, the churches objected that an Integrated Education Bill sought to prioritise the integrated sector (currently attended by just 7% of pupils in Northern Ireland) "above all others".

With the other churches, the PCI lobbies, instead, for the alternative of "shared education". This accepts "the right of communities to separate schools" but seeks to develop connections between through joint classroom, and extracurricular, initiatives.

=== Decarbonisation ===
In 2021 the General Assembly agreed to ‘…direct the Trustees to employ a 'divest and engage' strategy in relation to companies producing or using fossil fuels, thereby divesting from those that derive more that 10% of their turnover from oil and gas extraction (the coal, oil and gas majors), and engaging with companies that derive more than 10% of their turnover from the use of fossil fuels encouraging them to make clear commitments to the targets for global heating and carbon emission reduction as set out in the COP 21 Paris Agreement; reporting back to the 2022 General Assembly.'

=== Legacy of the Troubles ===
On the issue of dealing with the legacy of the Troubles, the Church's Council for Public Affairs has commented on "the right of victims and survivors to seek due process and justice in the courts. The Council’s report expressed its 'deep disquiet at the current proposals' stating that, 'whilst the Stormont House Agreement (SHA) was not perfect, it did set out a broader, four-strand framework to address legacy issues. We are on public record stating our support for all four key principles outlined in the SHA, especially the right of victims and survivors to seek due process and justice in the courts."

The Church is active in social work and provides services to those with addictions and offending behaviours, and who require supported housing through specialist facilities.

== Publications ==
- The Presbyterian Herald, is the official magazine of the Presbyterian Church in Ireland founded in 1943
- The Missionary Herald of the Presbyterian Church in Ireland (1904 to 1946) incorporated into Presbyterian Herald
- The Witness, was a Presbyterian newspaper, published in Belfast (from 1874 to 1941)
- Irish Presbyterian, (1853-1858 and 1895–1942) incorporated into The Presbyterian Herald
- The Banner of Ulster, was a twice-weekly Presbyterian newspaper published first on 10 June 1842 by William Gibson
- Young Men's Magazine, (1858-1859)
- The Presbyterian Penny Magazine, (1834-1837)
- The Orthodox Presbyterian, (1829-1840)
- The Covenanter, (1830-1843)
- The Bible Christian, (1830-1845)
- The Non-Subscriber, (1857-1863) re-founded as The Non-Subscribing Presbyterian in 1907
- The Orthodox Presbyterian, (1829-1840)
- The Presbyterian Churchman, (1877-1894)
- The Christian Irishman

== Bodies to which the PCI is affiliated ==
- Irish Council of Churches
- Community of Protestant Churches in Europe (Leuenberg Church Fellowship)
- Conference of European Churches
- World Communion of Reformed Churches

== See also ==
- Christianity in Ireland
- Presbyterianism
- Church of Scotland
- Religion in the United Kingdom
- Ulster-Scots
- History of Christianity in Ireland
- List of Irish Presbyteries

Other Presbyterian denominations in Ireland or Northern Ireland

- Free Presbyterian Church of Ulster
- Non-subscribing Presbyterian Church of Ireland
- Reformed Presbyterian Church of Ireland
- Evangelical Presbyterian Church
