= William Hamilton Drummond =

Irish poet and writer (1778–1865)

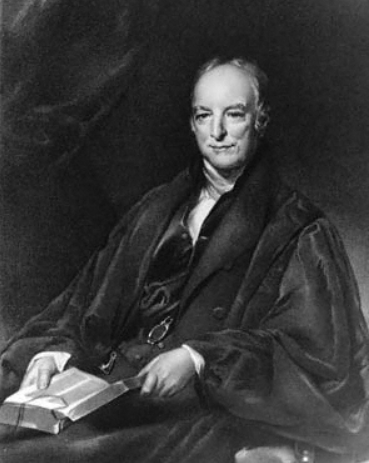
- Born: August 1778; Larne, Ireland
- Died: 16 October 1865 (aged 87); Dublin, Ireland
- Occupations: Poet; writer; controversialist
- Notable work: The Rights of Animals (1838)

William Hamilton Drummond, D.D. (August 1778 – 16 October 1865) was an Irish theologian, poet, animal rights writer and controversialist.

== Life ==
Drummond, eldest son of William Drummond, surgeon, R.N., by his wife Rose Hare, was born at Larne, County Antrim, in August 1778. His father, paid off in 1783, died of fever soon after entering on a practice at Ballyclare, County Antrim. His mother, left without resources, removed to Belfast with her three children, and went into business. Drummond, after receiving an education at the Belfast Academy, under James Crombie, D.D., and William Bruce, was placed in a manufacturing house in England. Harsh usage turned his thoughts from the prospects of commercial life, and at the age of sixteen he entered Glasgow College (November 1794) to study for the ministry.

Straitened means interrupted Drummond's course, and left him without a degree, but he acquired considerable classical culture, and as a very young student began to publish poetry, in which the influence of the revolutionary ideas of the period culminating in 1798 is apparent. Leaving Glasgow in 1798 he became tutor in a family at Ravensdale, County Louth, pursuing his studies under the direction of the Armagh presbytery, with which he connected himself on the ground of its exacting a high standard of proficiency from candidates for the ministry. In 1799, returning to Belfast, he was transferred to the Presbytery of Antrim, and licensed on 9 April 1800. He at once received calls from First Holywood and Second Belfast, and accepting the latter was ordained on 26 August 1800, the presiding minister being William Bryson. He became popular, especially as a preacher of charity sermons, and dealt little in topics of controversy.

On his marriage he opened a boarding-school at Mount Collyer, and lectured on natural philosophy, having among his pupils Thomas Romney Robinson, the astronomer. He was one of the first members of the Belfast Literary Society (founded 23 Oct. 1801), and contributed to its transactions several of his poems. Bishop Percy of Dromore sought his acquaintance, and obtained for him the degree of D.D. from Marischal College, Aberdeen (29 January 1810). In 1815 he was an unsuccessful candidate for the chair of logic and belles-lettres in the Belfast Academical Institution, and on 15 October that year he was called to Strand Street, Dublin, as colleague to James Armstrong, D.D. Installed on 25 December, he entered on the chief charge of his long life. He was soon elected a member of the Royal Irish Academy, contributed frequently to its Transactions, held for many years the office of its librarian, and took a scholarly interest in Celtic literature. His poetical pieces, versified from ancient Irish sources, are graceful paraphrases rather than close translations. Most of his writings show traces of very wide reading. His house was crammed with the heterogeneous results of an insatiable habit of book-collecting.

Some years after his settlement in Dublin Drummond came out as a polemic, exhibiting in this capacity a degree of sharpness and vivacity which seemed a rather remarkable outcome of his gentle and genial temperament. In two instances (in 1827 and 1828) he took advantage of discussions between disputants of the Roman Catholic and established churches as occasions for bringing forward arguments for unitarian views; and in the controversies thus provoked he was always ready with a reply. His essay on The Doctrine of the Trinity is the best specimen of his polemics. His Life of Servetus is a continuous onslaught on Calvinism.

In old age Drummond suffered from attacks of apoplexy, under which his powers of recollection were gradually extinguished. He died at Lower Gardiner Street, Dublin, on 16 October 1865 and was buried at Harold's Cross cemetery, near Dublin, on 20 October.

== Animal rights ==
First edition of The Rights of Animals (1838)

Drummond has been described as a "staunch advocate of animal rights". He authored An Essay on the Rights of Animals, which won an essay competition. This work was later published as The Rights of Animals: And Man's Obligation to Treat Them With Humanity, in 1838. It was written at the behest of the Society for the Prevention of Cruelty to Animals. In 2005, Edwin Mellen Press republished the book with editorial notes from Rod Preece and Chien-hui Li.

== Works ==
The following is a list of Drummond's poems:

- Juvenile Poems: By a Student of the University of Glasgow [1795].
- Hibernia. A Poem. Part the First, Belfast, 1797 (apparently all that was published).
- The Man of Age, Belfast, 1797 ("of age" here means "aged"); 2nd edition, in which "some things are suppressed", Glasgow, 1798 (with an ode on the death of Robert Burns).
- The Battle of Trafalgar: A Heroic Poem, 1806, (contributed to the Belfast Literary Society, 3 March).
- The First Book of T. Lucretius Carus on the Nature of Things. Translated into English verse, Edinb., 1808 (Belfast Literary Society, 7 March).
- The Giant's Causeway, Belfast, 1811, (three books, with two maps and five plates; Belfast Literary Society, 2 March 1807).
- An Elegiac Ballad on the Funeral of the Princess Charlotte, Dublin, 1817, (anon.).
- Who are the Happy, Dublin, 1818, (appended are other poems and 33 hymns).
- Clontarf, Dublin, 1822 (anon.).
- Bruce's Invasion of Ireland, Dublin, 1826.
- The Pleasures of Benevolence, 1835.
- Ancient Irish Minstrelsy, Dublin, 1852 (eight of the pieces in this volume had already appeared in vol. ii. of James Hardiman's Irish Minstrelsy, 1831).

Among his controversial works were:

- The Doctrine of the Trinity, 1827; 2nd edition, 1827; 3rd edition, 1831, (reprinted also in America).
- Unitarian Christianity the Religion of the Gospel, 1828.
- Unitarianism no feeble and conceited Heresy, 1829, (addressed to William Magee, in reply to a publication by a layman, Philip Dixon Hardy, commended by Magee).
- Original Sin, 1832.
- An Explanation and Defence of the Principles of Protestant Dissent, 1842 (in reference to proceedings taken against unitarian trustees by Duncan Chisholm, alias George Matthews).

His works on animal rights:

- Humanity to Animals, 1830.
- An Essay on the Rights of Animals, 1838.
- The Rights of Animals: And Man's Obligation to Treat Them With Humanity, 1838.

His biographical publications were:

- Funeral Sermon for James Armstrong, D.D., Dublin, 1840.
- Autobiography of Archibald Hamilton Rowan, with additions, Dublin, 1840.
- The Life of Michael Servetus, 1848.

With papers in the Transactions of the Royal Irish Academy, Drummond wrote a prize essay The Poems of Ossian, Dublin, 1830, defending James Macpherson's authorship. Posthumous was Sermons, 1867, with memoir and two portraits.

== Family ==
Drummond married twice;

- Barbara Tomb of Belfast, and had several children, of whom William Bruce Drummond and two daughters survived him;
- Catherine Blackley (d. 22 April 1879) of Dublin, by whom he left children Robert Blackley Drummond, minister of St. Mark's, Edinburgh; James Drummond, LL.D., principal of Manchester New College, London, and two daughters (one of the daughters by the second marriage died before him).

His brother was the surgeon and naturalist James Lawson Drummond.

Presbyterian Church titles
Preceded by James Armstrong	Minister of Strand Street Presbyterian Church, Dublin: church moved to St Stephen's Green in 1863 –; 1815–1865; With: James Armstrong,1815-1839; George Allman Armstrong,1841-1865	Succeeded by George Allman Armstrong
