= Henry Montgomery (minister) =

Irish Presbyterian minister

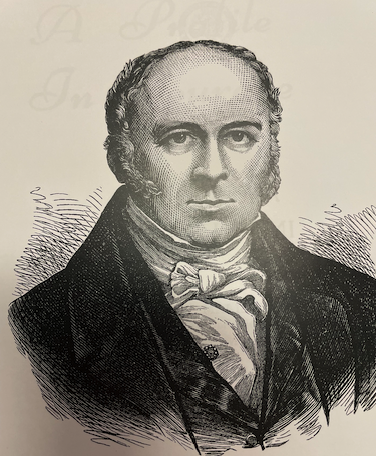
- Born: 16 January 1788; Killead, County Antrim
- Died: 18 December 1865 (aged 77); Dunmurry
- Occupation: Presbyterian minister

Henry Montgomery (16 January 1788 – 18 December 1865) was an Irish Presbyterian minister.

== Biography ==
Montgomery was the founder of the remonstrant synod of Ulster.

=== Early life and education ===
Henry Montgomery was the fifth son and youngest child of Archibald Montgomery, and was born at Boltnaconnel House, in the parish of Killead, County Antrim, on 16 January 1788. His father had held a commission in the Irish Volunteers of 1778 and was usually styled lieutenant. His mother was Sarah, daughter of William Campbell of Killeally, in the same parish. His brothers, William and John, being 'United Irishmen,' were engaged in the battle of Antrim, 7 June 1798. On 9 June a body of yeomanry, in search of the fugitives, plundered and burned his father's house.

Henry received his schooling in 1799 from Alexander Greer, at Lyle Hill, Co. Antrim, and in 1802 from Nathaniel Alexander (d. 7 April 1837), Presbyterian minister of Crumlin, Co. Antrim. In November 1804 he entered Glasgow College as a student for the ministry. He graduated M.A. in 1807, and after acting for a few months as a tutor in the family of Thomas. Stewart of Seapark, Carrickfergus, returned to Glasgow for a year's study of divinity.

=== Clerical career ===
He preached his first sermon at Killead on 8 January 1809, and on 5 February he was licensed by Templepatrick presbytery. In May he preached as candidate at Donegore, Co. Antrim, but was rejected for his refusal to subscribe to the Westminster confession. His life-long antagonist, Henry Cooke, D.D., was ultimately the successful candidate. On 11 June he preached for the first time at Dunmurry, Co. Antrim, within four miles of Belfast. On 9 July he received a call to the church in Dunmurry and he received a call on 9 July and was ordained by Bangor presbytery on 24 September as successor to Andrew George Malcom, D.D. At this ceremony he did not subscribe to the Westminster confession. In this pastoral charge, he remained till his death.

=== Teaching career ===
From the beginning of his settlement at Dunmurry, Montgomery engaged in tuition, and from 1815 he and his wife boarded pupils in their home.

On 3 October 1817, he was elected head-master, in succession to James Knowles of the English school in the Belfast Academical Institution, his congregation agreeing that he should reside there. He had just declined an invitation, made through Archibald Hamilton Rowan, to preach on trial at Killeleagh, Co. Down, the charge to which Cooke was subsequently elected. He held the mastership till June 1839 and exercised much influence on the literary education of Ulster. Children of all Presbyterian ministers he taught without fee. His connection with the institution naturally led him to vehemently repel the attacks made upon it as a 'seminary of Arianism' by Cooke from 1822.

Montgomery's first appearance as a debater in the general synod of Ulster was in June 1813, when he espoused the cause of William Steel Dickson, D.D., and helped to break the power of Robert Black, D.D., who, though a liberal in theology, had hitherto swayed the synod in the interests of political conservatism. In 1816 Montgomery was a candidate for the clerkship of synod but withdrew in favour of William Porter (1774–1843), minister of Newtownlimavady, County Londonderry. On 30 June 1818, at an unusually early age, he was elected moderator of the general synod.

== Subscribing and non-subscribing controversy ==
Since 1783, owing to the action of William Campbell, D.D., subscription had ceased to be in full force. Ministers no longer had to swear their agreement to the Westminster Confession of Faith. Ten of the fourteen presbyteries composing the synod treated subscription as optional. The result was a considerable amount of undemonstrative heterodoxy. A code of discipline, which had been contemplated since 1810, was adopted by the general synod at Moneymore, co. Londonderry, in 1824. It provided that presbyteries should ascertain 'soundness in the faith,' either by subscription or by examination. This compromise, suggested by Samuel Hanna, D.D., was accepted by all parties. But Cooke persistently sought to render the discipline more stringent. To defeat Cooke's policy was the object to which Montgomery devoted the marvellous resources of his commanding eloquence.

At Strabane in 1827 Cooke carried a proposal that members of the synod should declare whether or not they believed the doctrine of the Trinity. Only two voted 'Not.' Montgomery, who proclaimed himself an Arian, withdrew with others before the roll-call. His speech on this occasion, in favour of religious liberty, made a deep impression; it was circulated over Ireland, and a service of plate was presented to him (18 June 1828) by members of various denominations, including Roman Catholics. He had advocated Catholic emancipation since 1813.

At Cookstown in 1828 James Morell, minister of Ballybay, Co. Monaghan carried a resolution for the appointment of a committee for the theological examination of all candidates for the ministry. This was meant to defeat the action of liberal presbyteries, and cut off the supply of Arian clergy. On 16 October 1828, Montgomery and his friends adopted a 'remonstrance' at a Presbyterian meeting in Belfast, attended by Cooke. The last of Montgomery's speeches in the general synod was delivered at Lurgan on 3 July 1829. The remonstrance was presented at a special meeting of synod, held at Cookstown on 18 August, and terms of separation were arranged at a conference on 8 September. The first meeting of the remonstrant synod was held on 25 May 1830; it consisted of three presbyteries containing seventeen congregations; it retained the 1824 code of discipline, and its ministers were secured in the possession of the regium donum financial grant.

== Activism ==
Montgomery had visited the English Unitarians and advocated Catholic emancipation at public dinners in Manchester (December 1828) and London (January 1829). On his return, he spoke in the same strain from the altar of St. Patrick's, Belfast, at a meeting (27 January 1829) presided over by William Crolly, D.D., then Roman Catholic bishop of Down and Connor. To O'Connell's agitation for repeal of the union he was strongly opposed. His letter to O'Connell (1 February 1831) was among the most powerful attacks upon the Liberator's position and did much to alienate Irish liberals from his cause. He was in favour of Irish disestablishment and gave evidence in this sense before parliamentary committees in 1832.

He warmly supported the national system of education (established in 1831), which Cooke as warmly opposed.

In 1833 he received the degree of LL.D. from Glasgow University.

His last great personal encounter with Cooke was in connection with the management (1838–41) of the Belfast academical institution; his speech of 13 April 1841 was followed by the defeat of Cooke's endeavour to exclude Arian professors of theology from chairs in the faculty. In the struggle for the tenure of meeting-house properties and endowments by Unitarians, resulting in the Dissenters' Chapels Act 1844, Montgomery took a very important and laborious part. His exertions brought on an illness in London (1844), when Peel, whose support of the measure Montgomery had secured, showed him much personal attention.

== Non-subscribing church ==
In 1835 the association of Irish non-subscribing Presbyterians was founded. This was a union, though not an amalgamation, of the remonstrant synod with the Antrim presbytery and the Munster synod. Montgomery, who had since 1832 given regular courses of lectures to non-subscribing divinity students, was on 10 July 1838 appointed the association's professor of ecclesiastical history and pastoral theology. The office was without salary, till in 1847 the government endowed the chair with 150l. per annum out of regium donum. Many of the students became ministers to the English Unitarians. A controversy on the efficiency of the system of ministerial training arose in 1847. Montgomery founded in his synod in 1857 a revised code of discipline, which restricted the wide range already given to presbyteries in the matter of ministerial examination; but the new questions were withdrawn in 1863 in consequence of a legal decision in the Ballyclare case.

== Death and funeral ==
Montgomery, who had suffered from calculus, died at the Glebe, Dunmurry, on 18 December 1865, and was buried in the ground attached to his meeting-house on 20 December. His funeral was attended by all ranks and classes, including his old opponent Cooke, with whom in later years he had been on terms of friendship, and the Bishop of Down, Connor, and Dromore. The funeral sermon was preached (24 December) by Charles James McAlester (1810–1891) of Holywood, Co. Down.

== Family ==
Montgomery married, on 6 April 1812, Elizabeth Swan (d. 16 Jan. 1872, aged 78) of Antrim; they had ten children, of whom five died young.

== Publications and legacy ==
Having a remarkable memory, he rarely wrote either sermons or speeches. His first publication seems to have been an anonymous catechism (1811, 12mo); his best printed sermon is an anniversary discourse, 'We persuade men,' 1843, 8vo. Some of his best speeches are reprinted in his 'Life,' others are to be sought in separate pamphlets and in the 'Northern Whig.' In 1830 he was one of the original editors of the 'Bible Christian,' with Fletcher Blakely and William Bruce. In that year he published his theological apologia, ‘’The creed of an Arian’’. In 1846–7 he contributed to the 'Irish Unitarian Magazine' a valuable series of 'Outlines of the History of Presbyterianism in Ireland.'.

In person Montgomery was of commanding stature and handsome presence, with a voice of great sweetness, and fascinating manners. His portrait, painted in 1835 by John Prescott Knight, has been several times engraved. Classon Porter describes him as 'a born diplomatist'; his political influence with successive governments was undoubted. His politics in later life became more conservative. It has been alleged that his religious sentiments likewise underwent a change, but his theology neither advanced nor receded. His oratory was more polished than that of Cooke; in pathos and in sarcasm he was Cooke's equal, but he had not Cooke's mastery of the passions of a crowd. He was much in controversy with later developments of Unitarian thought, which he viewed as equivalent to deism. On his deathbed he recommended to his successor, Thomas Hugh Marshall Scott, his 'Creed of an Arian' (1830), as containing his lifelong opinions.

His son-in-law J. A. Crozier published ‘The life of the Rev. Henry Montgomery LL.D ‘.

In 2015, an Ulster History Circle Blue Plaque was unveiled on the walls of his old meeting house.
