= James Armstrong (Unitarian minister) =

Irish Unitarian minister

James Armstrong, D.D. (1780–1839), was an Irish Unitarian minister.

== Life ==
Armstrong was born in 1780 at Ballynahinch, County Down. He was the son of John Armstrong, who married a daughter of Rev. John Strong, for 36 years (1744–1780) presbyterian minister of Ballynahinch. He was a descendant of John Livingstone, of Killinchy, one of the founders of Irish presbyterianism. He was first trained at the Rademon Academy, under Moses Neilson, after which he became classical assistant to William Bruce at Belfast Academy, and conducted a special class of sacred history. He graduated at Trinity College, Dublin, and studied philosophy in the University of Edinburgh under Dugald Stewart. He was licensed 11 May 1806 by the Presbytery of Antrim (non-subscribing). The same year he received calls to Clonmel and Strand Street, Dublin (2 October); choosing the latter, he was ordained 25 December 1806 by Dublin Presbytery (non-subscribing) as a colleague to John Moody,(b. 11 Dec. 1742, d. 15 July 1813), after whose death William Hamilton Drummond, became (25 December 1815) his colleague. He was one of the founders of the Irish Unitarian Society (1830) and of the Association of Irish Nonsubscribing Presbyterians (1835), and he represented the latter body at the celebration of the tercentenary of the reformation at Geneva in August 1835.

In the previous year he had received the degree of DD from the university of Geneva. He was a member of the Royal Irish Academy. He died very suddenly at Stonehouse, Stillorgan Road, Dublin on Wednesday, 4 December 1839, having preached on the previous Sunday, and married a couple that very morning. He married Mary Allman, and left two sons (John Strong Armstrong, A.B., president of the Dublin Historical Society, and Rev. George Allman Armstrong, A.B., originally a barrister, who succeeded him in 1841 at Strand Street) and four daughters. A petition from his widow is printed in Parliamentary Debates on the Dissenters' Chapels Bill, 1844.

== Works ==
He published:

- 'A Discourse on Presbyterian Ordination,' and an 'Appendix, containing some account of the Presbyterian Churches in Dublin,' both included in the 'Ordination Service' for James Martineau, London 1829.
- 'The Sin against the Holy Ghost,' London 1836 (sermon before the British and Foreign Unitarian Association).
- 'A Sermon vindicating the Principles of Unitarian Christianity,' Dublin, 1838 (a discourse originating in local controversy).

Presbyterian Church titles
Preceded by John Moody	Minister of Strand Street Presbyterian Church, Dublin; 1806–1839; With: John Moody,1806-1813; William Hamilton Drummond,1815-1839	Succeeded by William Hamilton Drummond
