= William Bruce =

William Bruce may refer to:

== Law and politics ==
- William Bruce (diplomat) (died 1610), Scottish diplomat in Poland
- William Bruce (Canadian politician) (died 1838)
- William Wallace Bruce (1846–1907), British politician
- William Cabell Bruce (1860–1946), United States Senator

== Others ==
- William Bruce of Symbister (died 1624), Scottish landowner
- Sir William Bruce (architect) (c. 1630–1710), Scottish architect
- William Bruce, 8th Earl of Kincardine (died 1740), Scottish nobleman
- William Bruce (minister, born 1757) (1757–1841), Irish Presbyterian educator
- William Bruce (minister, born 1790) (1790–1868), Irish Presbyterian professor
- Sir William Bruce, 9th Baronet (1825–1906), Scottish cricketer
- William George Bruce (1856–1949), American publisher and civic leader
- William Napier Bruce (1858–1936), British educationalist
- William Blair Bruce (1859–1906), Canadian painter
- William Bruce (cricketer) (1864–1925), Australian cricketer
- William Speirs Bruce (1867–1921), Scottish naturalist and oceanographer
- William Bruce (VC) (1890–1914), Scottish military officer
- William J. Bruce III (born 1980), Canadian celebrity publicist

== See also ==
- Bill Bruce (disambiguation)
