= John Scott Porter =

Irish biblical scholar and Unitarian minister

John Scott Porter (31 December 1801 – 5 July 1880) was an Irish biblical scholar and a preacher in the Presbyterian and Unitarian denominations.

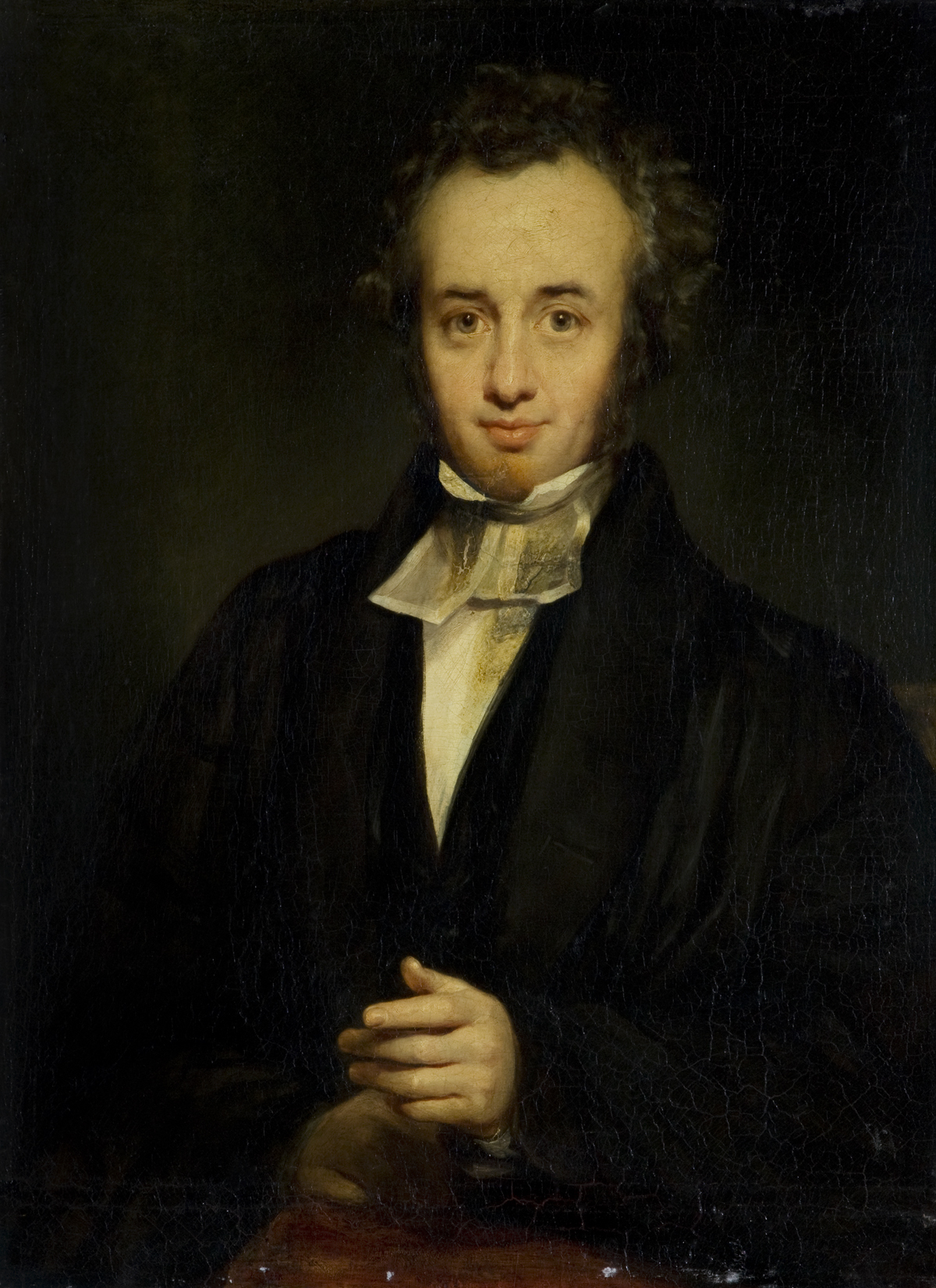
John Scott Porter, portrait c.1845

== Life ==
He was born on 31 December 1801 in Newtownlimavady, County Londonderry, Ireland on 31 December 1801; he was eldest son of William Porter (1774–1843), a Presbyterian minister, by his first wife, Mary Scott. The barrister William Porter (1805–1880) was a younger brother, and the minister Classon Emmett Porter (1814–1885) a half-brother.

After schools at Dirtagh and Derry, he was admitted as a student for the ministry under the care of Strabane presbytery. He took his arts course at the Belfast Academical Institution in 1817–19 and 1821–3, acting in the interim as tutor in a private family in County Kilkenny. In 1823–5 he studied Hebrew and divinity under Thomas Dix Hincks and Samuel Hanna.

Porter was licensed in October 1825 by Bangor presbytery, without subscription. On 1 January 1826 he received a unanimous call from the Presbyterian congregation in Carter Lane, Doctors' Commons, London, and was ordained there on 2 March, in succession to John Hoppus. His views were Arian, and he became the editor (1826–8) of an Arian monthly, the Christian Moderator; but he was in friendly relations with Thomas Belsham, the leader of those of Joseph Priestley's opinion.

With David Davidson, minister at the Old Jewry, Scott Porter kept a school at Rosoman House, Islington; among his pupils was Dion Boucicault. In January 1829 he declined a call to the second Presbyterian church of Belfast, to which a cousin, John Porter (1800–1874), was appointed. He accepted a call (11 September 1831) to the first Presbyterian church of Belfast, and was installed on 2 February 1832 by the Presbytery of Antrim. He was successor to William Bruce (1757–1841), and colleague to William Bruce (1790–1868) His ministry at Belfast included an early public discussion (14–17 April 1834) on the unitarian controversy with Daniel Bagot, and the arguments on both sides were issued in a joint publication.

From 1832 Porter had lectured on biblical subjects to divinity students, and on 10 July 1838 he was appointed, with Henry Montgomery, professor of theology by the "Association of Irish non-subscribing Presbyterians", his responsibilities being biblical criticism and dogmatics, in a chair endowed by government in 1847. On 16 July 1851 he was appointed professor of Hebrew and cognate languages. For many years he also taught classics to private pupils. He and his wife Margaret ran a day school in Belfast.

Later theological controversies were internal to Porter's own denomination. He led a secession from the Antrim presbytery (of which he had been clerk from 7 May 1834), and founded (21 February 1862) the northern presbytery of Antrim, with the purpose of emphasising a recognition of the authority of Christ and of divine revelation (the two presbyteries were reunited on 7 November 1894). On the same grounds he withdrew, with a large majority, from the local Unitarian society, and formed (December 1876) the Ulster Unitarian Christian Association.

Porter preached for the last time, at Larne, on 18 August 1878, and died, after long illness, at his residence, Lennox Vale, Belfast, on 5 July 1880; he was buried on 8 July in the Borough cemetery, Belfast, where an Irish cross of black marble was erected to his memory. A memorial tablet was placed in his church.

== Views ==
Though a recipient of regium donum, Porter supported the policy of Irish disestablishment. He favoured an Irish system of national education, organised the Ulster National Education Association, and was interested in efforts to preserve the Irish language. He followed the liberal theology of Henry Montgomery.

== Works ==
A list of Porter's 38 publications, including single sermons, was appended to his Memorial. They included:

- Authentic Report of the Discussion on the Unitarian Controversy, Belfast, 1834; four editions.
- Twelve Lectures in Illustration … of Unitarianism, Belfast, 1841; 2nd edit., London, 1853.
- Principles of Textual Criticism, with their application to the Old and New Testaments, 1848. Criticism, on the lines of Griesbach and Hug,.
- Servetus and Calvin: Three Lectures, &c., 1854.
- Bible Revision: Three Lectures, 1857.
- Lectures on the Doctrine of Atonement, 1860.
- The National System and the National Board, 1864, (anon.)
- Is the "National" or the "Denominational" System of Education the best?, 1868.
- The Fourth Gospel is the Gospel according to John, 1876. A defence (1876) of the authenticity of St. John's Gospel.

Porter contributed to the Bible Christian (which for a time he edited), the Ulster Journal of Archæology and the Christian Reformer. He also contributed to the Irish Unitarian Magazine, Christian Unitarian, and other periodicals. He contributed revised translations of Kings, Chronicles, Ezekiel, and Daniel to an edition of The Holy Scriptures of the Old Covenant issued by Longmans, 1859–1862.

== Family ==
Porter married, on 8 October 1833, Margaret Marshall (d. 7 April 1879, aged 66); they had eleven children. Sir Andrew Porter, 1st Baronet was their eldest son.

== Notes ==
Attribution

This article incorporates text from a publication now in the public domain: Lee, Sidney, ed. (1896). "Porter, John Scott". Dictionary of National Biography. Vol. 46. London: Smith, Elder & Co.

Presbyterian Church titles
Preceded by William Bruce (Senior); William Bruce (Junior)	Minister of First Presbyterian Church, Rosemary St, Belfast; 1832-1880; With: William Bruce (Senior), 1832-41; William Bruce (Junior), 1832-1868; Alexander Gordon, 1877-1880	Succeeded by Alexander Gordon
