= Unitarian Church in Ireland =

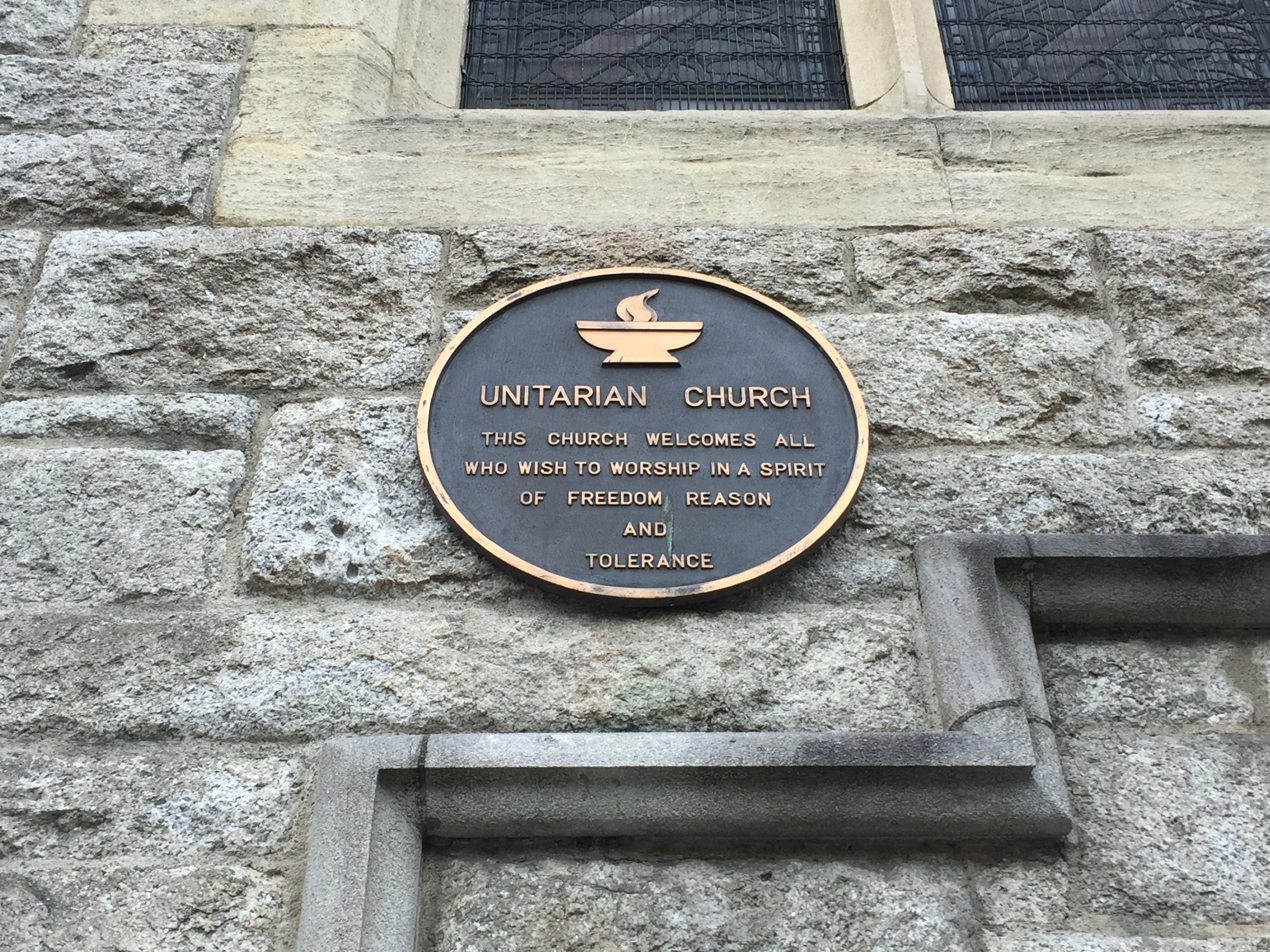
Plaque outside the Unitarian Church on St Stephen's Green, Dublin

The Unitarian Church in Ireland presently consists of two Congregations, Dublin and Cork, part of the Synod of Munster, in the Republic of Ireland, which has itself been part of the Non-Subscribing Presbyterian Church of Ireland since 1935. Some congregations remain closely associated with the General Assembly of Unitarian and Free Christian Churches. These churches would abide by the traditional Unitarian principles of Freedom, Reason, and Tolerance.

== History ==
Unitarianism in Ireland dates back to the 1600s with early recorded communities in Dublin and Bandon, Co. Cork, it has its roots in the Puritan Non-Conformist / Dissenters who did not subscribe to established church doctrines, like Westminster Confession. Unitarianism was illegal up until 1813. Thomas Emlyn and Joseph Boyse who ministered in Wood Street, Dublin, were two non-conformist ministers instrumental in Unitarianism developing in Ireland. In 1809 the Synod of Munster was founded when the non-subscribing presbyteries Dublin and others in the South of Ireland came together. In 1830 the Irish Unitarian Society (for the Diffusion of Christian Knowledge) now the Irish Unitarian Christian Society was formed. Among its founders was Rev. Dr. James Armstrong, who promoted Unitarianism particularly in the South of Ireland by publishing books and other works. In 1835 the Association of Non-Subscribing Presbyteries was formed. In 1910 the Non-subscribing Presbyterian Church of Ireland was formally established with the merger of the Antrim Presbytery and Remonstrant Synod of Ulster. In 1935 the Unitarian Synod of Munster joined the Non-subscribing Presbyterian Church of Ireland.

=== Former communities and churches ===
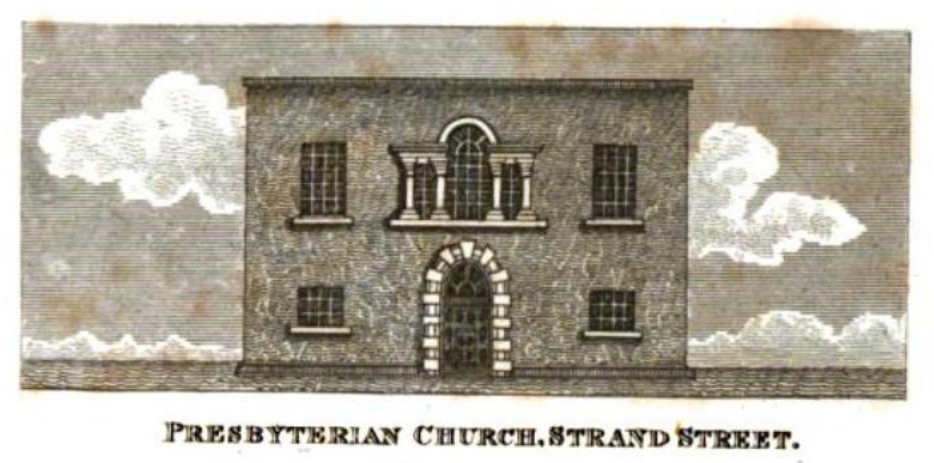
Presbyterian Church, Strand Street from an illustration in 1821.

In the past there were Unitarian communities in Clonmel, Co. Tipperary, as early as 1666, who met from 1789 to 1924 at the Unitarian Chapel (built in 1838) in Wellington Street, and Bandon, as early as the 1600s but met at the Unitarian Presbyterian Church, built by Rev. Edward King, sometimes called The Old Preaching House or The Seekers Church, in Bandon, from 1813 to 1908. It became a bakery and more recently an agricultural supplies store. There were also communities in Tipperary Town and a Presbyterian (Unitarian) Church in Fethard.

Prior to being based in Stephens Green, Unitarians had premises in Wood Street which moved to (Great) Strand Street in 1764, Cook Street joined Strand Street in 1787, and New Row which moved to Eustace Street in Dublin, the Eustace Street and Strand Street Congregations merged to form the new Dublin Unitarian Church on Stephens Green.

== Congregations and churches ==
The Synod of Munster is still one of the three presbyteries of the Non-subscribing Presbyterian Church of Ireland. Its two churches in the Republic of Ireland produce the monthly magazine Oscailt. A fellowship in Limerick began holding monthly Unitarian services in 2014, first at the Limerick School Project and then at the University of Limerick's interfaith Contemplative Centre, but disbanded in 2019.

=== Dublin Unitarian Church ===
The Dublin Unitarian Church is based on St. Stephen's Green. It is a Gothic styled building started in 1861 and opened in 1863, built by the architect William Henry Lynn of the Belfast company Lanyon, Lynn and Lanyon, largely funded by wealthy businessman Thomas Wilson. A stained glass window was donated by the coach building Hutton family. In recent years the church has hosted a variety of events including plays, film screenings, and concerts, and participated in Culture Night. Over 2006 and 2008 the archive of the Dublin Unitarian Church was transferred to the Royal Irish Academy. On Good Friday the Unitarian Church in Dublin hosts a reading out of the names of the victims of The Troubles in Northern Ireland, for Good Friday 2016, the dead of the 1916 Rising were also remembered. Ministers who have ministered at the Church include Rev. D. D. Jeremy, M.A., Rev E. Savell Hicks (1910–1962), Rev Kenneth Wright (1962–1996), Rev Bill Darlison (appointed in 1996) and Rev Bridget Spain who became permanent minister in 2012.

=== Unitarian Church Cork ===
The Unitarian Church in Cork has a history that stretches back for more than three hundred years. Since 1717 the congregation has met in the Church in Princes Street, built between 1710 and 1717, after it outgrew its premises in South Main Street. As a dissenting chapel without a steeple, it was originally called the Presbyterian Meetinghouse. Unitarianism was not a recognised religious movement until into the 19th century and did not appear on the church's signage until 2004. The Father Mathew Temperance Agreement was signed in this church building in 1839. In recent years the church has hosted plays and concerts and has been venue for the Cork festival and for Culture Night. In 2017 the church celebrated its tri-centenary, and has undergone some repairs for this celebration. On 26 January 2017 President Michael D. Higgins visited the church to mark its tercentenary year. On 24 February 2017 Rev Mike O'Sullivan was ordained and installed as minister of the church. He became the first Cork minister in almost 200 years. Following his appointment restoration began on the building. The entrance, main hall and South Chapel are now restored. Services are held every Sunday at 11 am. On Saturday 30 September a service of Thanksgiving was held to mark the 300th anniversary of the opening of the church. The service was led by the Moderator of the synod Rev Bridget Spain along with clergy from the synod. The sermon was preached by Rev Mike O 'Sullivan. The service was attended by the Deputy Lord Mayor and the Ven. Adrian Wilkinson representing the Church of Ireland diocese of Cork and Ross. The church building was extensively fire damaged on 29 January 2024 and since then meetings have been held online. Due to a lack of operational funds, Rev. Mike O Sullivan was made redundant by the Unitarian Church Cork on October 16, 2024, having taken his last service the previous Sunday. As a result Rev. O Sullivan decided to end his membership of and association with the NSPCI and the wider Unitarian movement.

== Famous Irish Unitarians ==
- George Allman - botany and natural history professor
- Rev. Dr. James Armstrong DD MRIA, minister in Strand Street
- Rev. William Bruce - Presbyterian(Unitarian) minister, philosopher and educator
- Richard Dowden - Lord Mayor of Cork; member of the Bandon, and Cork Congregations, and served as treasurer
- William Hamilton Drummond - minister in Strand Street Dublin (1819–1859)
- William Hazlitt, a Unitarian minister and author, and the father of the Romantic essayist and social commentator of the same name.
- Rev. Thomas Dix Hincks, founder of the Royal Cork Institution
- Rev. William Hincks (son of Thomas) - minister, theologian, professor of natural history in Cork and Toronto, edited Unitarian magazine The Inquirer
- Rev. Dr. John Leland ministered in New Row and Eustace Street for 50 years, (1716–1766).
- Daniel Maclise RA - artist; was a member of the Cork Congregation
- Archibald Hamilton Rowan - United Irishman
- Rev. Dr. Samuel Winter - Provost of Trinity College Dublin; first pastor to the New Row congregation
