= The Rights of Animals =

1838 book by William Hamilton Drummond

- First edition title page
- Author: William Hamilton Drummond
- Language: English
- Subject: Animal rights; Animal welfare; Animal theology
- Publisher: John Mardon
- Publication date: 1838
- Publication place: United Kingdom of Great Britain and Ireland
- Pages: 216
- Text: The Rights of Animals at the Internet Archive

The Rights of Animals, and Man's Obligation to Treat Them with Humanity is an 1838 book by the Irish Unitarian minister and writer William Hamilton Drummond. It originated as an essay submitted to a prize competition organised by the Society for the Prevention of Cruelty to Animals (SPCA), but was excluded because it arrived after the deadline. Drummond subsequently expanded the essay for publication, incorporating material from an earlier sermon on the treatment of animals.

Drummond argues for animal rights and maintains that humans have a Christian duty to treat animals humanely. He describes human dominion over animals as a "delegated trust" for which people are accountable to God. Although he accepts the use of animals for food and other human purposes, he maintains that their rights place moral limits on human conduct and condemns the infliction of unnecessary suffering.

== Background and publication ==
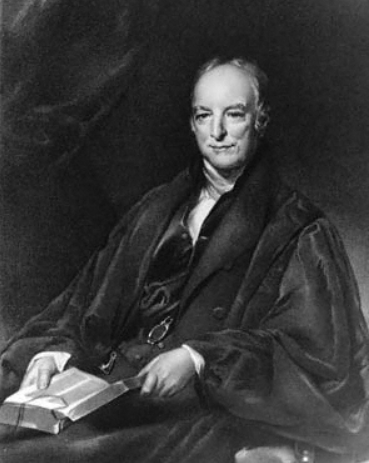
Drummond in 1846

In 1829, while visiting London, William Hamilton Drummond was asked by the Society for the Prevention of Cruelty to Animals (SPCA) to advocate its cause. After returning to Dublin, he delivered a sermon on the subject, published in 1830 as Humanity to Animals, the Christian's Duty.

When the SPCA later offered a prize for an essay on "Man's Obligation as respects the Brute Creation", Drummond submitted an entry. In the preface to The Rights of Animals, he explained that the essay reached London "arriving a day too late" and was therefore not considered. He subsequently expanded it for publication, incorporating passages from his 1830 sermon.

The book was published in London by John Mardon in 1838, with Hodges and Smith named on the title page as Dublin booksellers. Historian Chien-hui Li discusses the work in her study of the Christian arguments employed by the early British animal-protection movement, particularly the SPCA's efforts to promote religious duties towards animals.

In 2005, Edwin Mellen Press published a new edition, edited, introduced and annotated by Rod Preece and Li.

== Arguments and contents ==
The opening chapters examine the moral basis of human obligations towards animals and the duties imposed by Christianity. Drummond argues that animals, like humans, are capable of suffering and possess rights that can be violated by cruelty. He rejects the view that human dominion gives people unrestricted authority over other creatures, describing it instead as a "delegated trust" for which they must answer to God.

Drummond draws on Christian teachings to argue that mercy should extend beyond humanity to other sentient beings. He maintains that Christianity is a religion of mercy whose obligations extend to all creatures capable of suffering. Li identifies this interpretation as an example of the Christian discourse employed by nineteenth-century animal-protection advocates to argue for humane treatment.

Drummond then considers the use of animals for food, hunting and fishing. He accepts the consumption of animal flesh and defends certain forms of hunting and fishing, but argues that these practices are subject to moral restrictions. He distinguishes between killing animals for human purposes and inflicting suffering or destroying life without sufficient justification, maintaining that human rights over animals are limited.

Subsequent chapters examine the purposes for which animals exist and the benefits they provide to humans. Drummond discusses their usefulness, obedience and affection towards people, arguing that these qualities provide further reasons for treating them humanely.

A substantial portion of the book addresses the causes and forms of cruelty to animals. Drummond examines gambling, blood sports, luxury, gluttony, ignorance and hostility towards particular species. He also devotes chapters to cruelty committed in the pursuit of scientific knowledge, including vivisection and the killing of animals to obtain natural history specimens. He condemns experiments that inflict avoidable suffering, although he does not oppose all experimental use of animals.

The concluding chapters concern humane education, the possibility of animals existing after death and the arguments used to excuse cruelty. Drummond argues that cruelty in children can result from their upbringing and the example of adults, rather than being an unavoidable characteristic of childhood. He advocates teaching children kindness towards animals and concludes by rejecting attempts to justify cruelty.

== Reception and assessment ==
In an 1840 lecture to the Zoological Society of Ireland, the Church of Ireland clergyman Caesar Otway recommended Drummond's writings on animal rights, while making clear that he did not endorse Drummond's Unitarian sermons.

The American abolitionist Nathaniel Peabody Rogers discussed Drummond's book favourably in an 1845 article titled "The Rights of Animals". Rogers questioned the basis on which humans could claim rights while denying them to other animals. He argued that all beings capable of experiencing enjoyment or suffering possessed rights that humans were obliged to recognise. Rogers's essay was later included in Jean-Baptiste Jeangène Vilmer's anthology of animal ethics, Anthologie d'éthique animale: Apologies des bêtes, alongside nineteenth-century writings by Drummond, Lewis Gompertz and Arthur Schopenhauer.

Henry Stephens Salt offered a more qualified assessment. In the bibliography to the 1922 revised edition of Animals' Rights: Considered in Relation to Social Progress, he described Drummond's book as "a guarded essay", observing that its author advocated restrictions on vivisection while defending meat consumption and field sports.

Historian Helen O'Connell examines The Rights of Animals alongside Drummond's earlier Humanity to Animals in her study of animal welfare in nineteenth-century Ireland. She describes Drummond as a participant in the republican culture of the 1790s who argued that society could not become sufficiently humane while animals were denied rights. O'Connell interprets his writings in the context of the political and religious divisions of post-Union Ireland, particularly the period following Catholic emancipation in 1829.

== See also ==
- History of animal rights
- Christianity and animal rights
- A Dissertation on the Duty of Mercy and Sin of Cruelty to Brute Animals (1776), by Humphrey Primatt
- The Cry of Nature (1791), a defence of ethical vegetarianism
- An Essay on Humanity to Animals (1798), on Christian duties towards animals
- Moral Inquiries on the Situation of Man and of Brutes (1824), on animal rights
