= John Malcome =

British Presbyterian minister

- Born: 1662?
- Died: 17 May 1729; Dunmurry
- Occupation: Presbyterian minister

John Malcome (1662? – 17 May 1729) was a British Presbyterian polemic.

== Biography ==
Malcome was probably a native of Scotland. He was educated at Glasgow, where he graduated M.A. In December 1686 the Presbyterian congregation of Killead, co. Antrim, was divided into upper and lower. Malcome was called to Lower Killead in June 1687, and ordained there on 5 December, hence his birth may be dated about 1662. Early in 1699 he was transferred to Dunmurry, co. Antrim, where an old malt-kiln was used as a meeting-house.

In 1703 the Presbyterian clergy was divided on the question of the oath of abjuration. Malcome was strongly in favour of taking the oath, and attacked a neighbouring minister, Alexander McCracken (d. November 1730), who, though a staunch Hanoverian, had preached against the oath as sinful, and had retreated to Scotland to avoid it. The affair came before the general synod of Ulster in June 1704, when Malcome was rebuked and McCracken admonished.

In 1720 the non-subscription controversy broke out in Belfast in connection with the installation of Samuel Haliday. Malcome adhered to subscription. He was the inventor of the phrase ‘new light,’ which, in a criticism of John Abernethy, he applies to the position of the non-subscribers. It is observable, however, that he does not employ it in its present received sense, as denoting a new departure in theology. His point is that ‘a set of men, by preaching and printing, pretend to give new light to the world by putting personal persuasion in the room of a church government.’

He died at Dunmurry on 17 May 1729. He was buried in Dunmurry on 20 May 1729.

He published:

- ‘Personal Persuasion no Foundation for Religious Obedience … friendly Reflections on a Sermon … by … Abernethy,’ &c., Belfast, 1720,18mo.
- ‘More Light … Remarks on the late Vindication … By a true lover of Presbyterian Principles,’ &c. [Belfast], 1721–2, 32mo (conjectured by Reid to be Malcome's).
- ‘The Dangerous Principles … revived … by our Modern New Lights,’ &c., Belfast, 1726, 12mo. Letters by Malcome are printed in Thomas Gowan's ‘Power of Presbyters,’ 1711, 4to, and in. ‘Remarks on a Pamphlet … by … Tisdall,’ 1716, 4to, by Joseph Boyse
