= Harriet Ritvo =

American historian

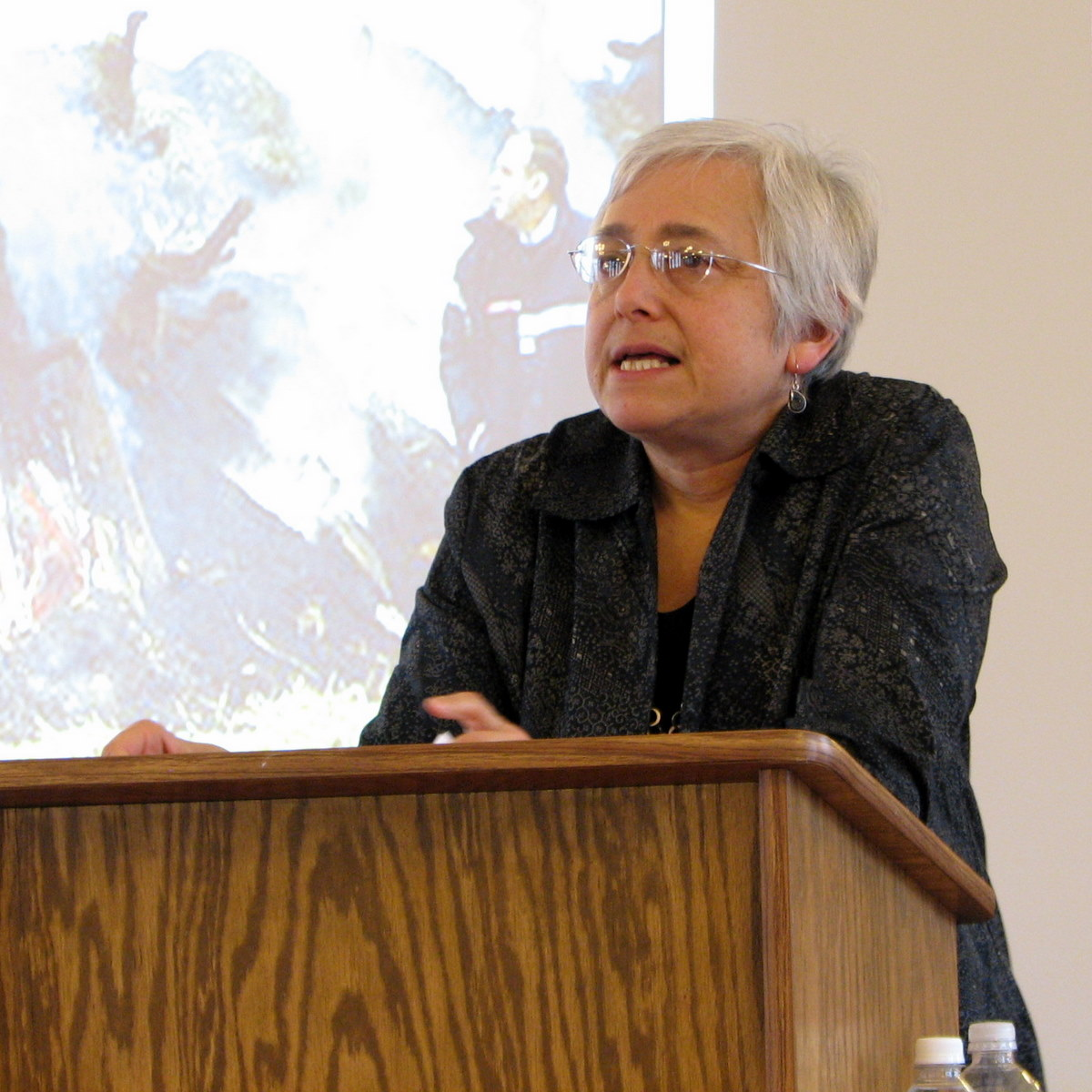
- Ritvo delivering a talk at Yale University
- Born: September 19, 1946 (age 80); Cambridge, Massachusetts, U.S.
- Occupations: Historian, author

Academic background
- Education: Harvard University (A.B; Ph.D.)

Academic work
- Main interests: British cultural history Environmental history History of natural history

Harriet Ritvo (born September 19, 1946) is an American historian who specializes in British history, particularly environmental history and the history of natural history. Ritvo is the Arthur J. Connor Professor of History at MIT and a member of the Program in Science, Technology and Society, and she was the head of MIT's History Faculty from 1999–2006.

== Biography ==
=== Early life ===
Harriet Ritvo was born on September 19, 1946 in Cambridge, Massachusetts, and received her A.B. and Ph.D. from Harvard University. She also studied at Girton College at Cambridge University.

=== Career ===
Harriet Ritvo joined the Massachusetts Institute of Technology as a lecturer in the Humanities Department in 1979 and was promoted to assistant professor in 1980. In 1985, she was promoted to associate professor and then full professor in 1987. She has been teaching as the Arthur J. Connor Professor of History at MIT since 1995. From 1999-2006, Ritvo served as the head of the History Faculty at MIT as well as the director of Graduate Studies for the History, Anthropology, and Science, Technology and Society (HASTS) program from 2011-2013 and 2017-2018.

She was on the Humanities jury for the Infosys Prize from 2016 to 2018.

Ritvo has been a Visiting Fellow at Clare Hall at Cambridge University, as well as at Balliol College at Oxford University. Since 2016, Ritvo has served as a trustee of the National Humanities Center in Research Triangle Park, NC.

== Publications ==
Ritvo has published books on the history of British scientific classification of animals and of the roles of animals in Victorian culture.

Ritvo is the author of the following books:

- The Animal Estate: The English and Other Creatures in the Victorian Age (Harvard UP, 1987)
- The Platypus and the Mermaid, and Other Figments of the Classifying Imagination (Harvard UP, 1997)
- The Dawn of Green: Manchester, Thirlmere, and Modern Environmentalism (Chicago UP, 2009)
- Noble Cows and Hybrid Zebras: Essays on Animals and History (Virginia, 2010)

Ritvo was the editor of:

- Charles Darwin's The Variation of Animals and Plants under Domestication (Johns Hopkins University Press, 1998)

Ritvo was a co-editor of:

- Macropolitics of Nineteenth-Century Literature: Nationalism, Imperialism, Exoticism (University of Pennsylvania Press, 1991)

=== Periodicals ===
Ritvo has written articles and reviews on British cultural history and environmental history in such periodicals as The London Review of Books, Science, Daedalus, The American Scholar, Technology Review, and The New York Review of Books, as well as scholarly journals in several fields.

== Recognition ==
Ritvo received a Whiting Award for nonfiction writing in 1990 following her first book, The Animal Estate: The English and Other Creatures in the Victorian Age (1987). In 2008, she was a recipient of the Radcliffe Institute for Advanced Study Graduate Society Award, which is awarded to Harvard and Radcliffe graduate alumnae who have made significant contributions in their field.

== See also ==
- Animal studies
- Hilda Kean
- Chien-hui Li
