= Irish Council of Churches =

The Irish Council of Churches (ICC) (founded 1922, reorganised under its present name 1966) is an ecumenical Christian body. It is a sister organisation of Churches Together in Britain and Ireland.

Member churches are currently:

- The Antiochian Orthodox Church,
- The Church of Ireland,
- The Greek Orthodox Church in Britain and Ireland,
- The LifeLink Network of Churches,
- The Lutheran Church in Ireland,
- The Methodist Church in Ireland,
- The Moravian Church (Irish District),
- The Non-subscribing Presbyterian Church of Ireland,
- The Presbyterian Church in Ireland,
- Ireland Yearly Meeting (Quakers),
- The Rock of Ages Cherubim and Seraphim Church, (Eternal Sacred Order of Cherubim and Seraphim)
- The Romanian Orthodox Church in Ireland,
- The Russian Orthodox Church in Ireland,
- The Salvation Army (Ireland Division),
- The Syriac Orthodox Church.

The Irish Inter-Church Meeting (IICM) was established in 1973 as a forum between ICC's member churches and the Catholic Church.
