= Sam Hutton =

Rugby union player from Northern Ireland

- Full name: Samuel Allen Hutton
- Died: 2019
- School: Belfast Royal Academy

Rugby union career
- Position: Prop
International career
Years	Team	Apps	(Points)
1967	Ireland	4	(0)

Samuel Allen Hutton is an Irish former international rugby union player.

Educated at Belfast Royal Academy, Hutton was a strong, mobile prop, who played his rugby with Malone. He was only 19-year of age when he earned his first Irish trial and won all four of his Ireland caps in 1967, debuting in the Five Nations match against Scotland at Murrayfield. His final cap came in a win over the Wallabies in Sydney and during the same trip he memorably kicked a drop-goal in a tour match.

Hutton emigrated to South Africa in 1975. He died in 2019.

== See also ==
- List of Ireland national rugby union players
