= Barton McCallan =

Irish rugby union player (born 1936)

- Born: 18 July 1936 (age 90) Belfast, Northern Ireland
- School: Belfast Royal Academy
- University: Queen's University Belfast

Rugby union career
- Position: Hooker
International career
Years	Team	Apps	(Points)
1960	Ireland	2	(0)

Barton McCallan (born 18 July 1936) is a former Ireland international rugby union player from Northern Ireland.

Born in Belfast, McCallan attended Belfast Royal Academy and was first XV captain for two seasons, while gaining Ulster Schools representative honours. He went on to Queen's University and earned his first Ulster call up as a varsity player. In 1958, McCallan moved to Ballymena to work at a tobacco manufacturer and joined Ballymena RFC.

McCallan was a hooker for Ireland in two 1960 Five Nations matches, against England at Twickenham and Scotland at Lansdowne Road, forming a front-row partnership with Ballymena teammate Syd Millar.

== See also ==
- List of Ireland national rugby union players
