= Bill Bruce =

Bill Bruce may refer to:

- Bill Bruce (guitarist), American guitarist, producer, and songwriter
- Bill Bruce (athlete) (1923–2002), Australian athlete who won a silver medal at the 1948 Olympics in long jump
- Bill Bruce (died 1943), American airman in World War II, the Bruce–Mahoney Trophy is named partially in his honor
- Bill L. Bruce, American film producer, see Stingray (film)

== See also ==
- William Bruce (disambiguation)
