= Andrew George Malcom =

Irish Presbyterian minister and hymn-writer

- Born: 15 September 1782; County Down
- Died: 12 January 1823 (aged 40)
- Occupations: Presbyterian minister and hymn-writer

Andrew George Malcom (15 September 1782 – 12 January 1823) was an Irish Presbyterian minister and hymn-writer.

== Biography ==
Malcom was born at Hill Hall House, County Down, on 15 September 1782. He was the second son of James Malcolm (d. 3 October 1805), who was ordained minister of Drumbo, County Down, on 24 December 1764, in succession to his uncle, Andrew Malcom (d. 2 March 1763). His mother was Fanny, third daughter of Andrew Kennedy, presbyterian minister of Mourne, County Down. Through his mother he was the great-grandson of George Lang (d. 25 January 1702), the first presbyterian minister of Newry.

He was educated at Glasgow, where he graduated M.A. On 11 March 1807 he was ordained by Bangor presbytery as minister of Dunmurry, County Antrim. He was not related to his predecessor at Dunmurry, John Malcome. He resigned Dunmurry on 11 September 1808, and was installed minister of first Newry, County Down, on 14 March 1809. His ministry at Newry was one of marked success, and his position as a leader of educational and charitable movements was highly influential. His theology was Arian, of an uncontroversial type. Early in 1820 he received the degree of D.D. from Glasgow. On 27 June 1820 he was elected moderator of the general synod of Ulster. On 28 June 1821 the general synod approved an exposition of the principles of presbyterianism from his pen, and ordered it to be prefixed as an introduction to their forthcoming code of discipline. This order was not carried out, the introduction being set aside in committee after Malcom's death. He died of fever at Newry on 12 January 1823.

== Family ==
He married Eleanor Hunter, by whom he had five sons and two daughters. His children reverted to what they believed to be the original spelling of his surname - i.e. Malcolm. His eldest son, James Malcolm (b. 1811, d. 26 December 1855), was unitarian minister successively at Carrickfergus, County Antrim; Billingshurst, Sussex; Boston, Lincolnshire; and Chester. His fourth son, Andrew George Malcolm, M.D. (b. 7 December 1818, d. 1857), was physician to the Royal Hospital, Belfast.

== Publications ==
He published:

- A Collection of Psalms, Hymns, and Spiritual Songs, &c., Newry, 1811, 12mo. This contains 405 hymns, twenty-three of them being by Malcom himself, and was long the most considerable collection put forth in connection with Irish presbyterianism. It was in use at Newry till 1887, and at Dundalk for many years. Many of Malcom's own hymns are of real merit; six are retained in ‘Hymns for Christian Worship,’ 1886, the authorised hymnal of non-subscribing presbyterians; a large number remain unpublished.
- A Catechism … for … Young Persons, &c., Newry, 1812, 12mo.
- The Communicant's Catechism, &c., Newry, 1812, 12mo. Malcom was one of the founders (1813) of the ‘Newry Magazine,’ and for years a frequent contributor. He had some hand in the Newry edition of 1816, 12mo, of Towgood's ‘Dissent,’ probably writing the section ‘Of Church Government,’ &c., in the Irish appendix.

His journal has also been published.
