= Alexander Henry Haliday (physician) =

Irish physician and politician

- Born: c. 1728; Belfast
- Died: 28 April 1802; Belfast
- Occupations: Physician and politician

Alexander Henry Haliday (c. 1728 – 28 April 1802) was an Irish physician and politician.

== Biography ==
Haliday was the son of Samuel Haliday, the nonsubscribing divine, was born at Belfast about 1728. He was educated at Glasgow as a physician, and practised with great repute at Belfast, where for nearly half a century he was one of the most influential of public men. On 23 December 1770 Belfast was invaded by some twelve hundred insurgents belonging to the society known as ‘Hearts of Steel,’ who marched from Templepatrick, co. Antrim, to rescue one David Douglas, imprisoned on a charge of maiming cattle. The ‘Hearts of Steel’ were animated by agrarian discontent, and their immediate grievance was that Belfast capitalists had purchased leases from the Marquis of Donegall over the tenants' heads. Haliday's prompt interposition between the rioters and the authorities saved the town from destruction by fire. His house in Castle Street was the headquarters of James Caulfeild, earl of Charlemont, on his annual visits to Belfast from 1782 in connection with the volunteer conventions. His correspondence with Charlemont (of which some specimens are given in Benn) lasted till the earl's death, and is full of information on the politics of the north of Ireland, enlivened by strokes of humour. He died at Belfast on 28 April 1802. ‘Three nights before he died,’ writes Mrs. Mattear to William Drennan, ‘Bruce and I played cards with him, and the very night that was his last he played out the rubber. “Now,” said he, “the game is finished, and the last act near a close.”’ He was buried in the Clifton Street cemetery, then newly laid out. His will leaves to his wife (an Edmonstone of Red Hall) ‘a legacy of 100l. by way of atonement for the many unmerciful scolds I have thrown away upon her at the whist table,’ also ‘the sum of 500l. in gratitude for her never having given on any other occasion from her early youth till this hour any just cause to rebuke or complain of her,’ and ‘a further sum of 100l.’ for her goodness in amusing him with ‘a game of picket’ when his eyesight had decayed. His fine library, rich in classics, was sold after his death; part of it was later the property of the First Presbyterian Church, Belfast. Haliday wrote, but did not publish, a tragedy, submitted to Charlemont, and many satirical verses. His grandson and namesake published anonymously a volume of original hymns, Belfast, 1844, 16mo.

His great-nephew was the entomologist Alexander Henry Haliday.
