= George Benn =

Irish historian

George Benn (1 January 1801 – 8 January 1882) was an Irish historian of Belfast.

== Biography ==
Benn was born on 1 January 1801, at Tanderagee, County Armagh. His grandfather, Jonn Benn, came from Cumberland about 1760 as engineer of the Newry canal. His father, also John Benn (1767-1853), was proprietor of a brewery in Belfast; George was his fourth son. He was educated at the Belfast Academy, under Rev. Dr. Bruce; afterwards under Sheridan Knowles, then a teacher of English at Belfast. He entered the collegiate classes of the Belfast Academical Institution in 1816, being one of the original alumni, and took gold medals in logic (1817) and moral philosophy (1818).

In 1819 the faculty prize was offered for the "best account of a parish". Benn was the successful essayist, with the parish of Belfast as his theme. He gained also in 1821 the faculty prize ("The Crusades"), and Dr. Tennant's gold medal ("Sketch of Irish Authors in the Seventeenth and Eighteenth Centuries"). The lad's essay of 1819 attracted the attention of James M'Knight, LL.D., then editor of the Belfast News-Letter who offered to print and publish it. It was issued anonymously in an enlarged form in 1823, with three maps and sixteen engravings by J. Thomson. For so young a writer it was a work of uncommon judgment and research, exceedingly well written, with an eye for scenery and a taste for economics as well as for antiquities. It is not superseded by Benn's later and later labours.

Benn, with his brother Edward (1798-1874), engaged in distilling near Downpatrick; subsequently the brothers spent the prime of their days on an estate they purchased at Glenravel, near Ballymena. Here, in an unimproved district, they planted the hillsides, ploughed the moors, built good houses, and collected a valuable library. They endeavoured to create a new industry by an experiment in the manufacture of potato spirit, but excise regulations (since repealed) frustrated their object. The cost of the experiment, and the losses from potato disease, induced the brothers to undertake a business in Liverpool for some years. Returning to Glenravel, a casual circumstance led to a rich discovery of iron ore in the Glenravel hills; the first specimen was smelted in 1851 under Edward Benn's direction; in 1866 an agreement was made with Mr. James Fisher, of Barrow-in-Furness, to work the mineral beds. Hence came a new and valuable addition to the commercial products of Ulster, which has since attained important proportions.

Meanwhile, Edward Benn was contributing antiquarian articles to various journals (Journ. Kilkenny Archaeol. Soc., Irish Penny Journal, etc.), and forming a fine archaeological collection, now in the Belfast Museum. It had been proposed to George to resume and complete the history of Belfast. He modestly indicated, as more fit for the task, Mr. William Pinkerton, who collected some materials, but died (1871) without having begun the history. Pinkerton's papers were submitted to George Benn for publication, but he found employment of them impracticable, and states in his preface to his history, "It is all my own work from beginning to end."

He returned to Belfast after his brother's death in 1874, publishing A History of the Town of Belfast in 1877. A second volume appeared in 1880. This supplementary volume, though the proof-sheets were "corrected by a kind friend", the late John Carlisle, head of the English department in the Royal Academical Institution, bears evidence of the author's affecting statement: "Before I had proceeded very far, my sight entirely failed." Benn died on 8 January 1882. He is buried in Belfast City Cemetery.

Edward and George Benn were members of the non-subscribing Presbyterian (Unitarian) body, but wide in their sympathies and broad in their charities beyond the limits of their sect. Edward was the founder, and George the benefactor, of three hospitals in Belfast (the "Eye, Ear, and Throat", the "Samaritan", and the "Skin Diseases"), and their gifts to educational institutions were munificent. Both were unmarried. They left four sisters.

== Works ==
- The History of the Town of Belfast, with an Accurate Account of its Former and Present State, to which are added a Statistical Survey of the Parish of Belfast and a Description of some remarkable Antiquities in its Neighbourhood, 1823. 8vo.
- A History of the Town of Belfast from the Earliest Times to the close of the Eighteenth Century, 1877. 8vo, with eight maps and two portraits.
- A History of the Town of Belfast from 1799 till 1810, together with some Incidental Notices on Local Topics and Biographies of many well-known Families.
