= Chien-hui Li =

Taiwanese historian

- 李鑑慧
- Awards: Wu Ta-You Memorial Award (2012); Academia Sinica Scholarly Monograph Award (2020)

Academic background
- Education: National Cheng Kung University; King's College, Cambridge (MPhil; PhD)
- Thesis: Mobilizing Traditions in the Animal Defence Movement in Britain, 1820–1920 (2002)

Academic work
- Discipline: History
- Sub-discipline: Animal history; British history; History of social movements
- Institutions: National Cheng Kung University; Fu Jen Catholic University; Wolfson College, Cambridge
- Notable works: Mobilizing Traditions in the First Wave of the British Animal Defense Movement (2019)

Chien-hui Li (Chinese: 李鑑慧) is a Taiwanese historian and professor of history at National Cheng Kung University. Her research examines British animal protection movements and the history of human–animal relationships, including the experiences of animals during the Industrial Revolution. Her 2019 book, Mobilizing Traditions in the First Wave of the British Animal Defense Movement, received the 2020 Academia Sinica Scholarly Monograph Award in the Humanities and Social Sciences.

== Education and academic career ==
Li studied history at National Cheng Kung University before obtaining an MPhil and PhD in history from King's College, Cambridge. Her 2002 doctoral thesis was titled Mobilizing Traditions in the Animal Defence Movement in Britain, 1820–1920. Her 2019 monograph, Mobilizing Traditions in the First Wave of the British Animal Defense Movement, developed from this doctoral research.

Li was a junior research fellow at Wolfson College, Cambridge, and an assistant professor in the Department of History at Fu Jen Catholic University. She subsequently joined the Department of History at National Cheng Kung University, where she became a professor. Li is also a fellow of the Oxford Centre for Animal Ethics.

Her research and teaching interests include modern European history, British history, the history of social movements, animal history and Western historiography. In 2012, she received the Wu Ta-You Memorial Award.

== Research ==
=== British animal protection movement ===
Li's early research examined the development of the British animal protection movement from the nineteenth century onwards, including its religious, political and cultural foundations. In a 2000 article published in Society & Animals, she examined the relationship between Christianity and the emerging British animal protection movement, particularly the influence of evangelical Christianity and the changing place of religious ideas as evolutionary theories became more prominent.

Her 2019 book, Mobilizing Traditions in the First Wave of the British Animal Defense Movement, published by Palgrave Macmillan, examines how British animal protection campaigners drew upon Christianity, political radicalism, natural history, evolutionary thought and literature during the nineteenth and early twentieth centuries. The study considers the movement's responses to animal experimentation, the treatment of working animals, slaughter, hunting, vegetarianism and other practices involving animals. Li approaches the movement as an active participant in the interpretation and adaptation of existing intellectual and cultural traditions. A Chinese translation by Tsang Wan-lam (曾琬淋), titled 为动物而战：19世纪英国动物保护中的传统挪用, was published by Guangqi Book Company in 2025.

The book received the 2020 Academia Sinica Scholarly Monograph Award in the Humanities and Social Sciences. The award committee's assessment discussed Li's treatment of the relationship between animal protection and intellectual traditions in nineteenth-century Britain.

Alongside her historical research, Li co-edited an edition of William Hamilton Drummond's The Rights of Animals, and Man's Obligation to Treat Them with Humanity (1838) with Rod Preece. She also translated Andrew Linzey's Animal Gospel into Chinese, with editions published in 2005 and 2006.

=== Animal history ===
Li has also worked on the development of animal history as an academic field. In 2020, she helped organise a special issue of the Cheng Kung Journal of Historical Studies devoted to animal history. In his introduction to a 2021 special issue of Chinese Studies in History, historian Q. Edward Wang identified Li, alongside Huaiyu Chen, Li Ruo-wen and Cheng Li-jung, as one of the principal scholars working on animal history in the Chinese-speaking academic community.

Her later research has examined the contributions and experiences of animals during the Industrial Revolution in Britain, including their roles in agriculture, mining, transportation and urban life. In a 2020 article, she investigated the contribution of livestock and working animals to industrialisation and the conditions in which they lived and worked. A 2021 study reconsidered the relocation of London's Smithfield Market in the mid-nineteenth century, examining the interactions between people and animals involved in the livestock trade.

In a 2023 interview, Li discussed the treatment of livestock during the transition from traditional droving to railway and steamship transportation. She argued that historical accounts of industrialisation should consider animals' experiences and their contributions to economic and social developments. She also advocated drawing upon ethology, veterinary science and animal welfare research to inform the historical study of animals.

== See also ==
- Animal studies
- Harriet Ritvo
- Hilda Kean
- History of animal rights
- Timeline of animal welfare and rights in Europe
