= Fletcher Blakely =

Irish Presbyterian minister

- Born: 13 May 1783; Ballyroney, County Down
- Died: 25 February 1862 (aged 78); Cradley, Worcestershire
- Occupation: Presbyterian minister

Fletcher Blakely (13 May 1783 – 25 February 1862) was an Irish non-subscribing Presbyterian minister.

== Biography ==
Blakely was born on 13 May 1783 at Ballyroney, County Down. He was the youngest son of Joseph Bleakly, a farmer, and was named after the Rev. William Fletcher, Presbyterian minister of Ballyroney (d. 1824), who gave him his early training; both his parents died when he was very young.

In 1799 he entered Glasgow College (at which time he spelled his name Bleakly), where he graduated. On 19 September 1809 he was ordained by Bangor presbytery as minister of Moneyrea, County Down, in succession to Samuel Patton. Blakely held this post for over 50 years until his death.

Fletcher had trained Blakely in Calvinism, but he did not long retain this form of theology. He became by degrees a Unitarian of what was then a very advanced type in Ireland, being the first avowed humanitarian preacher in Ulster (after 1813; see Mon. Rep. 1813. p. 515). Under his influence Moneyrea was so marked a home of heterodox opinion that it passed into a proverb, 'Moneyrea, where there is one God and no Devil.' In 1821, the English unitarians sent John Smethurst (1792–1859) on a mission to Ulster, and the Moneyrea meeting-house was the first that was opened to him; the Arian pulpits were (with five exceptions) refused to him.

In 1829 Blakely, with his whole congregation, joined the remonstrant secession from the synod of Ulster; he had throughout the previous synodical debates been one of the most powerful coadjutors of Henry Montgomery, the leader of the New Light party, and assisted him in forming the remonstrant synod.

On 27 April 1836 a public testimonial bore witness to his successful advocacy of the rights of conscience and human freedom.' In his own neighbourhood he did much for popular education, for the cause of tenant right, and for the promotion of the flax industry. He was a joint-editor (1830–3) of the 'Bible Christian'.

He resigned his charge on 22 September 1857, but continued to preach till the installation of his successor, John Jellie, on 27 September 1859.

He died on 25 February 1862 at Cradley, Worcestershire, the residence of the Rev. William Cochrane, who had married his eldest child. He was buried at Moneyrea.

== Science ==
Blakely was involved in the growing scientific discussions on geology and phrenology; in the early 1830s, he wrote several letters to the Guardian and Newsletter newspapers under the name of ‘Philalethes’, debating the merits of phrenology and materialism.

In the 1820s, he also set up five schools around the Moneyrea area.

== Family ==
He married Margaret Lindsay (1783–1825), and they had four children: Jane, who married Rev. William Cochrane; Sarah (1814–1844); David Lindsay (1816–1854), inspector of Irish National Schools; and William Joseph (17 April 1818 – 19 March 1842), unitarian minister at Billingshurst, Sussex, and York Street, Belfast.

== Publications ==
He published two or three tracts and sermons, especially:

- 'A Dialogue,' Belf. 1817, 8vo (anon.); on the bible and other standards of faith (not seen; it was answered by a covenanting minister, not Paul).
- 'The Battle of the Two Dialogues, being a conversation between a Rev. Covenanter and a Rev. Presbyterian on the impropriety of adhering to any standard of faith except the Bible,’ Belf. 1818, 8vo (also anon.; in reply to it John Paul, then covenanting minister of Loughmourne, afterwards of Carrickfergus and D.D. (died 17 March 1848, aged 71), published his first work, ‘Creeds and Confessions defended,’ &c., Belf. 1819, 8vo, which is one of the most caustic pieces of satire ever contributed on the orthodox side of the religious controversies in Ulster).
- ‘The Doctrine of the Trinity not comprised in the Faith which was once delivered unto the Saints’ (Jude 1–3), London, 1846, 8vo.
- ‘An Explicit Avowal of Truth the best mode of teaching it’ (Romans i. 16), Belfast, 1853, 8vo (preached as president of the Association of Irish Nonsubscribing Presbyterians).
