= Alexander Gordon (Unitarian) =

English Unitarian minister and religious historian

Alexander Gordon (9 June 1841 – 21 February 1931) was an English Unitarian minister and religious historian. A prolific contributor to the Dictionary of National Biography, he wrote for it well over 700 articles dealing mainly with nonconformists.

== Life ==
Gordon was born in Coventry, the son of John Gordon, a Unitarian minister. He was an undergraduate at the University of Edinburgh from 1856 to 1859, then trained at Manchester New College in London, and studied under Ignaz von Döllinger in Munich. He was a minister at Aberdeen, at Hope Street Unitarian Chapel in Liverpool alongside Charles Wicksteed, and at the Octagon Chapel, Norwich, before settling in Belfast in 1877 at its First Presbyterian Church. He was Principal of the Unitarian Home Missionary College, Manchester, from 1890 to 1911. Gordon also contributed dozens of articles to the Encyclopædia Britannica Eleventh Edition (1911).

== Notes ==
Presbyterian Church titles
Preceded by John Scott Porter	Minister of First Presbyterian Church, Rosemary St, Belfast; 1877-1889; With: John Scott Porter, 1877-1880	Succeeded by James Kirk Pike
