= Harry Rea =

Rugby union player from Northern Ireland

- Full name: Harold Halliday Rea
- Born: 18 March 1946 (age 80) Belfast, Northern Ireland
- School: Belfast Royal Academy
- University: University of Edinburgh
- Occupation: Professor of medicine

Rugby union career
- Position: Centre
International career
Years	Team	Apps	(Points)
1967–69	Ireland	2	(0)

Harold Halliday Rea (born 18 March 1946) is an academic and former Ireland international rugby union player.

== Early life ==
Born in Belfast, Rea was educated at Belfast Royal Academy, where he followed his brothers John and Richard in captaining the first XV. He led the school to the 1964 Ulster Schools' Cup title (shared with Campbell College).

== Rugby career ==
Rea played his senior rugby with Edinburgh University, North of Ireland, London Irish and Ulster, while winning two Ireland caps as a centre. He made his debut in Ireland's 1967 win over the touring Wallabies and played a 1969 Five Nations match against France, both at Lansdowne Road.

== Medicine ==
Rea moved to New Zealand in 1974 to take over an Auckland medical practice. He became a professor of medicine.

== See also ==
- List of Ireland national rugby union players
