= William Bruce (minister, born 1790) =

Irish Presbyterian minister and professor

- Born: 16 November 1790; Belfast
- Died: October 25, 1868 (aged 77)
- Occupations: Presbyterian minister and professor

William Bruce (16 November 1790 – 25 October 1868) was an Irish Presbyterian minister and professor.

== Biography ==
Bruce was born at Belfast 16 November 1790. He was the second son of minister William Bruce. He was educated first at the Belfast Academy under his father; entered Trinity College, Dublin, on 2 July 1804, where he obtained a scholarship and graduated A.B. on 20 July 1809. Meantime he attended a session (1808–1809) at Edinburgh, where he studied moral philosophy, church history, &c., under Dugald Stewart, Hugh Meiklejohn, and others. His theological studies were directed by the Antrim presbytery, by which body he was licensed on 25 June 1811. On 19 January 1812 he was called to First Belfast as colleague to his father, and ordained 3 March. He had few of his father's gifts, but his quiet firmness and amiability gave him a hold on the affections of his people. Theologically he followed closely in his father's steps. It is believed that he edited the Belfast edition, 1819, 8vo, of ‘Sermons on the Christian Doctrine,’ by Richard Price, D.D. (originally published 1787), which contain a mild assertion of a modified Arianism, as a middle way between Calvinism and Socinianism. In 1821 Bruce came forward as a candidate for the vacant classical and Hebrew chair in the Belfast Academical Institution. Two-thirds of the Arian vote went against Bruce, in consequence of the hostility hitherto shown to the institution by his family; but Sir Robert Bateson, the episcopalian leader, and Edward Reid of Ramelton, moderator of the general synod, made efforts for Bruce, and he was elected on 27 October by a large majority. The appointment conciliated a section which had stood aloof from the institution on the ground that it had sympathised with unconstitutional principles in 1798, and ultimately the government grant, which had been withdrawn on that account, was renewed (27 February 1829). Bruce, still keeping his congregation, held the chair with solid repute till the establishment of the Queen's College (opened November 1849) reduced the Academical Institution to the rank of a high school. The Hebrew chair was separated from that of classics in 1825, when Thomas Dix Hincks, LL.D., another Arian, was appointed to fill it. Bruce took no active share in the polemics of his time. An early and anonymous publication on the Trinity sufficiently defines his position. In later life he headed the conservative minority in the Antrim presbytery, maintaining that nonsubscribing principles not only allowed but required a presbytery to satisfy itself as to the Christian faith of candidates for the ministry. The discussion was conducted with much acrimony (not on Bruce's part), and ended in the withdrawal of five congregations, since recognised by the government as a distinct ecclesiastical body, the northern presbytery of Antrim, of which, at its first meeting, 4 April 1862, Bruce was elected moderator. In the same year the jubilee of his ordination was marked by the placing of stained glass windows in his meeting-house. He retired from active duty on 21 April 1867. From 1832 he had as colleague John Scott Porter, who remained sole pastor. He continued his services to many of the charities and public bodies of the town. He studied agriculture, and carefully planted his own grounds at The Farm. His last sermon was at a communion in Larne on 28 April 1867. He died 25 October 1868, and was buried at Holywood 28 October. On 20 May 1823 he married Jane Elizabeth (died 27 November 1878, aged 79), only child of William Smith of Barbadoes and Catherine Wentworth. By her he had four sons and six daughters; his first-born died in infancy; William died 7 November 1868, aged 43; Samuel died 6 March 1871, aged 44.

He published:

- ‘Observations on the Doctrine of the Trinity, occasioned by the Rev. James Carlile's book, entitled “Jesus Christ, the Great God our Saviour,”’ Belfast, 1828, 8vo, anonymous; Carlile was minister of the Scots Church, Mary's Abbey, Dublin (died March 1854).
- ‘On the Right and Exercise of Private Judgment,’ Belfast, 1860, 8vo (sermon, Acts iv. 19, 20, on 8 July).
- ‘Address delivered to the First Presbyterian Congregation, Belfast, on Sunday, 12 Jan. 1862, in reference to the recent proceedings in the Presbytery of Antrim,’ Belfast, 1862, 12mo.
- ‘On Christian Liberty; its Extent and Limitation,’ Belfast, 1862, 12mo (sermon, 1 Cor. viii. 9, on 5 Oct., the day of the reopening of his church after the erection of memorial window).
