= Thomas Drennan =

Irish Presbyterian minister (1696-1768)

- Born: 25 December 1696; Belfast, Ireland
- Died: 14 February 1768 (aged 71); Belfast, Ireland
- Occupation: Presbyterian minister

Thomas Drennan (25th December 1696–14 February 1768) was an Irish Presbyterian minister active in advocating political and religious reforms as a "New Light" scholar.

== Life ==
Drennan was born in Belfast, Kingdom of Ireland on 25th December 1696. He was a friend of James Arbuckle and Drennan graduated from the University of Glasgow at the same time. Drennan was first ordained as a Presbyterian minister in Holywood. Drennan later became the minister of First Presbyterian Church, Belfast, where he was installed in 1736 as a colleague of Samuel Haliday. Drennan and Haliday shared the theological viewpoint to not subscribe to the Westminster Confession of Faith. He became sole minister of the congregation following Hailday's death in 1739. He was one of several Irish reformers who influenced Scottish Enlightenment philosopher Francis Hutcheson, during the latter's time as master of an academy in Dublin. Drennan taught New Light philosophy based upon equity and justice.

Despite being recognised by his contemporaries as a learned philosopher and Christian scholar, as well as being listed in the Dictionary of Irish Philosophers, none of his philosophy work or sermons exist in written form. The historian Ian McBride described him as "an elegant scholar". Drenan died in Belfast on 14 February 1768. James Crombie became one of the ministers of First Presbyterian Church, Belfast following Drennan's death.

== Family ==
Drennan's son, William Drennan, would become a famous physician, poet, and political radical. His daughter, Martha, married the United Irishman Samuel McTier.

Presbyterian Church titles
Preceded by Samuel Haliday	Minister of First Presbyterian Church, Rosemary St, Belfast; 1736–1768; With: Samuel Haliday, 1736-1739; Andrew Millar, 1745-1749; Clotworthy Brown, 1749-1756; James Mackay, 1756-1768	Succeeded by James Mackay; John Beatty; James Crombie (from 1770)
