= James Crombie (minister) =

James Crombie D.D. (1730–1790) was the founder of Belfast Academy.

== Early life ==
The eldest son of James Crombie [sic], a mason, by his wife May Johnstoun, he was born at Perth in December 1730.

In 1748 he matriculated at the University of St Andrews, graduating A.M. in 1752. He studied for a short time at Edinburgh on leaving St Andrews.

== Minister in Scotland ==
Crombie was licensed by Strathbogie presbytery on 8 June 1757 at Rothiemay, where he acted as parish schoolmaster for some time. On 1 July 1760 he was presented to Lhanbryde, near Elgin, by the Earl of Moray, in whose family he had acted as tutor. Having been duly called, he was ordained at Lhanbryde on 11 September by Elgin presbytery.

Crombie then immediately applied to the Strathbogie presbytery to give ordination without charge to James Thompson, a licentiate, in order that Thompson might fill his place at Lhanbryde, and release Crombie for winter studies at Glasgow University. The Strathbogie presbytery agreed, and Crombie spent the next four sessions at Glasgow, attending classes himself, and superintending the studies of his pupil. Attempts to bring Crombie back to his duties at Lhanbryde culminated in a formal censure on 1 March 1763. After this he seems to have stayed for some years in his country parish.

== Move to Ireland ==
In February 1768 a colleagueship in the first non-subscribing Presbyterian congregation of Belfast became vacant on the death of Thomas Drennan. Presumably with the recommendation of Principal William Leechman of Glasgow, Crombie was put forward for the post. He received a call in December 1769, but did not give up his charge at Lhanbryde until 22 October 1770, when he was already settled in Belfast as colleague to James Mackay. On Mackay's death (22 January 1781) he became sole pastor of the First Presbyterian Church of Belfast.

His congregation, which worshipped in a dilapidated meeting-house, was declining; Crombie met a suggestion for amalgamation with a neighbouring congregation by proposing the erection of a new meeting-house. This was carried into effect in 1783; John Wesley, who preached in the new building in 1789, describes it as "the completest place of worship I have ever seen". In September 1783 Crombie was made D.D. of St. Andrews.

== Belfast Academy ==
Crombie planned a non-sectarian college in Belfast. This would provide higher education, so that Presbyterian boys would not need to travel to Dublin or Glasgow. This modified earlier plans of William Campbell for a university in northern Ireland, and differing from William Crawford's Strabane college by dropping theology from the curriculum. A prospectus for the Belfast Academy, issued on 9 September 1785, had broad support in Belfast, and funds were subscribed.

The scheme was ambitious, and included a provision of preparatory schools. The Academy was opened in February 1786. Crombie, as principal, took on classics, philosophy, and history. The same political complications that led to the collapse of the Strabane Academy frustrated Crombie's original ideas and the Belfast Academy lost its collegiate classes; but as a high school it established itself, with success under Crombie's successor William Bruce.

== Last years ==
Crombie's health declined, but he continued his duties. On 10 February 1790 he attended a meeting of the Antrim presbytery, at which two congregations were added to its roll, and he was appointed to preside at an ordination on 4 March. On 1 March he died.

== Works ==
Crombie stayed out of theological disputes, but he defended Presbyterians from charges of schism. He published:

- An Essay on Church Consecration, Dublin, 1777, (published anonymously in February); 3rd edit. Newry, 1816, (a defence of the Presbyterians, who had lent their meeting-house to episcopalians during the rebuilding of the church, against a charge of schism).
- The Propriety of Setting apart a Portion of the Sabbath for the purpose of acquiring the Knowledge and use of Arms, Belfast 1781; countered the strict sabbatarian standpoint by advocating Sunday drill for volunteers, in time of public danger and answered by Sinclare Kelburn in The Morality of the Sabbath Defended, 1781.
- Belfast Academy, Belfast 1786, an enlarged issue of the original newspaper prospectus.
- Two Volunteer Sermons, Belfast, 1778 and 1779.

== Family ==
Crombie was married on 23 July 1774 to Elizabeth Simson (d. 1824), and left four sons and one daughter.

== Legacy ==
The Crombie building at the school is named after him.

== Notes ==
Attribution

This article incorporates text from a publication now in the public domain: Stephen, Leslie, ed. (1888). "Crombie, James". Dictionary of National Biography. Vol. 13. London: Smith, Elder & Co.

Presbyterian Church titles
Preceded by Thomas Drennan (died 1768); James Mackay; John Beatty	Minister of First Presbyterian Church, Rosemary St, Belfast; 1770–1790; With: James Mackay, 1770–1781	Succeeded by William Bruce
