= Andrew George Malcolm =

Andrew George Malcolm (1818–1856) was an Irish medical doctor and medical historian, who was employed by the General Hospital in Belfast. He has been called the "earliest respiratory physiologist" of the hospital. Today, he is mostly known for his reports on the sanitary state of Belfast and particularly for his History of the General Hospital. Malcolm is also considered to be the "first historian" of Belfast General Hospital.

== Early life and education ==
Malcolm was born in Belfast in 1818 to Andrew George Malcom, (a Presbyterian minister in Dunmurry and Newry) and Eleanor Hunter of Dunmurry. He was their fourth son. His father died when he was only five years of age. At the end of his schooling at Inst he had been assistant to Henry Montgomery, the famous headmaster of the English department and his father's successor at Dunmurry. It was there, at the medical school, that he would commence his medical training. Malcolm graduated from Edinburgh in 1842 at the age of 24. His thesis was on the pathology of continued fever and he received one of the three gold medals of the year.

== Medical career ==
In 1843, Malcolm was appointed medical attendant to the Dispensary in Belfast, to attend the sick at the Dispensary rooms and in their own homes. In 1846 he was appointed to the hospital as physician, at the age of 28. From then on he was in regular attendance on the sick in the old hospital in Frederick Street. He lived nearby in York Street as those working in the medical profession did in those times. Apart from his general medicine, Malcolm had a class in skin diseases and was powerful and assiduous teacher. He says in his History, "Clinical instruction is not to be imparted by a careless walk through the wards. On the part of the teacher, the most patient, assiduous, vigilant, zealous and unceasing labour, and on the part of the pupil, the most rigid attendance, are absolutely necessary to develop the educational resources of a Hospital'. He was also a main contributor of specimens to the pathological museums of the Belfast Medical Society and the Belfast Clinical and Pathological Society, of which he was the founder.

== Writings ==
While Malcolm wrote both medical and historical texts, he is primarily known for his historical writing and his records, which remain valuable historical sources today. During his time at the hospital, Malcolm wrote many reports on the sanitary state of Belfast. His reports were the result of several years of study of the housing, the water-courses, the sewers and drains of Belfast, the water supply, and the statistics or estimates of disease and mortality, some of which he had to compile for himself. Malcolm also published a statistical paper on the Influence of Factory Life on the Health of the Operatives, showing the harmful effect of flax dust on the lungs of the workers, and pleading for improvements in factory hygiene. There are two other major reports, among numerous lesser papers, one on the Asiatic cholera in Belfast (there were only 84 cases and Malcolm regretted the paucity of numbers) and one on the epidemic dysentery in the north of Ireland. In 1851 he published his History of the General Hospital at Belfast, which has become a valuable resource for the study of the sanitary state of Belfast during the famine.
