= James Gray (poet) =

Scottish educator, poet and linguist

James Gray (c. 1770 – 1830) was a Scottish educator, poet and linguist. While master of the high school of Dumfries, he became a friend of Robert Burns, later teaching his children. He later held posts at the high school of Edinburgh and the Belfast Academy. He then took orders in the Church of Ireland, serving as a chaplin for the East India Company in Kutch and serving as tutor to the young Rao or Prince of that province, Deshalji II.

== Life ==
Gray was originally the master of the high school of Dumfries, where he became good friends with Robert Burns. From 1801 to 1822, he was master of the high school of Edinburgh. In 1822, he became Headmaster of the Belfast Academy.

Gray subsequently took orders in the Church of Ireland and in 1826 went out to India as chaplain in the East India Company's service at Bombay. He was eventually stationed at Bhuj in Kutch and was entrusted by the British government with the education of the young Rao of that province, Deshalji II, being, it is said, the first Christian who was ever honoured with such an appointment. Gray died at Bhuj on 25 March 1830.

== Works ==
Gray published anonymously, Cona; or the Vale of Clwyd. And other poems, London, 1814 (2nd ed., with author's name, 1816); and edited the Poems of Robert Fergusson, with a life of the poet, Edinburgh, 1821. He left a poem on India in a manuscript. Another poem, A Sabbath among the Mountains, is attributed to him. His Kutchi version of the Gospel of St. Matthew was printed at Bombay in 1834. A manuscript collection of his poems in Scots, now in the possession of the National Library of Scotland, is one of the earliest extant collections of Scots poetry. It includes variant readings of several poems by Robert Henryson and a collection of prayers, geographical tables and chronological tables of early Scottish history, all written in Latin.

== Family ==
Gray married Mary Phillips of Longbridgemoor, Annandale, the eldest sister of James Hogg's wife. His family mostly settled in India. Hogg introduced Gray into the Queen's Wake as the fifteenth bard who sang the ballad of King Edward's Dream.
