= Rod Preece =

English-Canadian philosopher and historian (1939–2021)

- Born: Rodney John Charles Preece; 15 August 1939; Cheadle Hulme, England
- Died: 22 July 2021 (aged 81); Cheadle Hulme, England
- Citizenship: British; Canadian
- Education: University of Leicester (B.A., PhD)
- Occupations: Political philosopher; historian
- Spouse: Lorna Chamberlain
- Partner: Janet Penny
- Children: 2

Rodney John Charles Preece (15 August 1939 – 22 July 2021) was an English-Canadian political philosopher and historian of animal rights and vegetarianism. He was professor emeritus in the Department of Political Science at Wilfrid Laurier University. Preece authored and edited 19 books on animal rights and welfare, vegetarianism, German politics, socialisation in Europe, and political theory.

== Biography ==
=== Early life and education ===
Rodney John Charles Preece was born in Cheadle Hulme, England, on 15 August 1939. He earned a B.A. in philosophy and a PhD in political science from the University of Leicester.

=== Academic career ===
Preece taught at the University of Surrey and the University of Leicester before moving to Canada in 1969 to lecture for one year at the University of Waterloo. He later accepted a full-time position at Waterloo. In 1973, he joined Wilfrid Laurier University. He was later Maurice Young Invited Research Scholar in the Centre for Applied Ethics at the University of British Columbia.

Preece's early work was on European politics, especially German politics. He later wrote on political philosophy and ideology, particularly conservatism. From the 1990s, his work focused on animal rights and animal welfare.

Preece authored and edited 19 books. His 1998 book Animals and Nature: Cultural Myths, Cultural Realities was shortlisted for the Harold Adams Innis Prize and the Raymond Klibansky Prize, and was named a Choice Outstanding Academic Book.

=== Advocacy roles ===
Preece served on the board of directors of the Ontario Society for the Prevention of Cruelty to Animals and on the executive boards of the Oxford Centre for Animal Ethics and the Campbell Centre for the Study of Animal Welfare at the University of Guelph. He was also vice-president of the Canadian Federation of Humane Societies.

Preece was on the advisory board of the Christian Vegetarian Association.

=== Personal life and death ===
For many years, Preece owned an antique store in Waterloo, Ontario. He was married to Lorna Chamberlain, who predeceased him; they had two children.

In 2013, Preece moved back to Cheadle Hulme after reuniting with Janet Penny, a former girlfriend. He died there on 22 July 2021, aged 81.

== Selected publications ==
- Animal Welfare and Human Values (with Lorna Chamberlain; Wilfrid Laurier University Press, 1993)
- Animals and Nature: Cultural Myths, Cultural Realities (1998)
- Awe for the Tiger, Love for the Lamb: A Chronicle of Sensibility to Animals (2002)
- William Hamilton Drummond's Rights of Animals and Man's Obligation to Treat Them with Humanity (edited with Chien-hui Li; The Edwin Mellen Press, 2005)
- Brute Souls, Happy Beasts and Evolution: The Historical Status of Animals (2005)
- Sins of the Flesh: A History of Ethical Vegetarian Thought (2008)
- Animal Sensibility and Inclusive Justice in the Age of Bernard Shaw (2012)
