= Kenneth Houston =

Irish rugby union player

- Born: Kenneth Houston; 20 July 1941 (age 85)

Rugby union career
- Position: Wing
- Correct as of 11 October 2012
International career
Years	Team	Apps	(Points)
1960-1965	Ireland	6	(0)
- Correct as of 11 October 2012

Kenneth Houston (born 20 July 1941) is an Irish former rugby union player. He won 6 caps playing on the wing for the Irish rugby union side between 1960 and 1965. He was later a schoolteacher at Merchiston Castle School in Edinburgh until retiring in 2001.
