= William Campbell (minister) =

Irish Presbyterian minister

- Died: 17 November 1805
- Occupation: Presbyterian minister

William Campbell (died 17 November 1805) was an Irish Presbyterian minister.

== Biography ==
Campbell was the son of Robert Campbell, merchant, of Newry. In 1819 it is said that there were about fifteen hundred living descendants of his grandmother, who died in 1727. Campbell was educated at Glasgow, where he matriculated in November 1744, and was licensed by Armagh presbytery in 1750. He became tutor in the Bagwell family of Clonmel, and in this capacity spent seven years in France. He got into prison in Paris, through refusing to genuflect while the host was passing. Returning to Ireland in 1758 he married his cousin, Jane Carlile of Newry, and in 1759 was ordained minister of the non-subscribing presbyterians at Antrim. In November 1764 he became minister of First Armagh, in connection with the general synod, his successor at Antrim being William Bryson. He was moderator of synod in 1773 at Lurgan. In 1782 the rule of 1705, requiring subscription before ordination, was practically repealed on his motion. An unpublished pamphlet, addressed to Hussey Burgh in the same year, proposed a scheme for a northern university which, though considered by several governments, ultimately failed through Henry Grattan's disapproval. In 1783 he exerted himself to procure an addition to the regium donum (then yielding only 9l. a year to each minister), and obtained an increase of 1,000l. a year to the grant. But the influence of Lord Hillsborough went strongly against the general synod, for political reasons; by his advice a grant of regium donum (500l. a year) was for the first time given to the secession church. However, the synod acknowledged Campbell's efforts by a presentation of plate in 1784. His alma mater gave him the degree of D.D. in the same year. In 1786 he entered into controversy with Richard Woodward, bishop of Cloyne, who had maintained that none but episcopalians could be loyal to the constitution. Woodward answered Campbell, omitting to answer a stronger attack by Samuel Barber. Campbell wrote against the reply with calmness and learning. Meanwhile, his eyesight had failed, and he was nearly blind. He had earned the gratitude of his denomination, but was paid this time only with addresses of congratulation. Applying in 1788 for the post of synod's agent for the regium donum, he was defeated by a large majority in favour of Robert Black. Campbell, much mortified, determined to leave the north of Ireland. On 14 September 1789 he resigned Armagh, and spent the remainder of his days in charge of the small flock at Clonmel, Tipperary. He is said to have shone more in conversation than in the pulpit, and to have possessed much scientific knowledge and a remarkable memory. He was probably an Arian, certainly a strong opponent of subscription. He died on 17 November 1805, leaving three surviving children out of a family of eleven. His successor at Clonmel was James Worrall. Campbell published:

- ‘The Presence of Christ with his church,’ &c., Belfast, 1774, 8vo (synodical sermon at Antrim on 28 June, from Matt. xxviii. 20).
- ‘A Vindication of the Principles and Character of the Presbyterians in Ireland; addressed to the Bishop of Cloyne,’ &c., Dublin, 1787, 12mo (four editions).
- ‘An Examination of the Bishop of Cloyne's Defence,’ &c. Belfast, 1788, 12mo. He left a manuscript history of presbyterianism in Ireland of some value. It refers for further particulars to other manuscripts not preserved.
