= William Bruce (minister, born 1757) =

Irish Presbyterian minister and educator

William Bruce (1757–1841) was an Irish Presbyterian minister and educator.

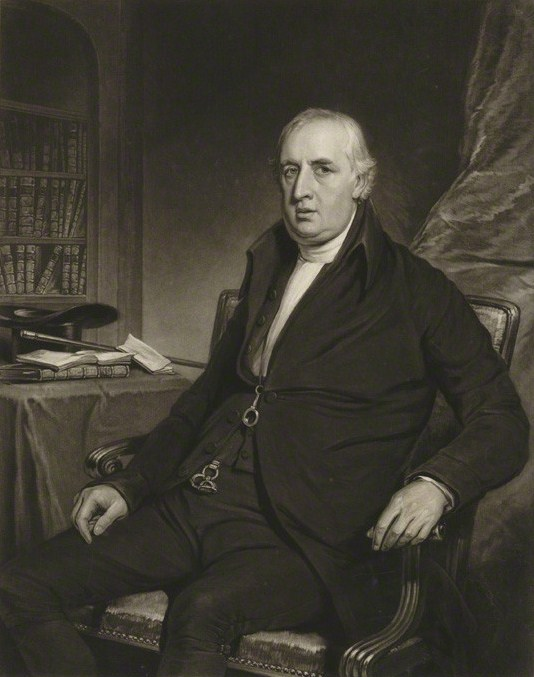
William Bruce, 1819 engraving

== Early life ==
The second son of Samuel Bruce, Presbyterian minister and grandson of Michael Bruce, of Wood Street, Dublin, and Rose Rainey of Magherafelt, County Londonderry, he was born in Dublin on 30 July 1757. He entered Trinity College, Dublin, in 1771. In 1775, he obtained a scholarship, and graduated A.B., supporting himself by private tuition. In 1776, he went to Glasgow for a session, and, in 1777, to Warrington Academy for two years.

Bruce's first settlement was at Lisburn, and he was ordained, on 4 November 1779, by the Bangor presbytery. His father's old congregation at Strand Street, Dublin, then called him on 24 March 1782 as colleague to John Moody, D.D., on the death of Thomas Plunket. He took part in the volunteer movement of 1782, serving in the ranks, but declined a command. At the national convention which met in November 1783, in the Rotunda at Dublin, he sat as delegate for Carrickfergus, and was the last surviving member of this convention. In 1786, he received the degree of D.D. from Glasgow University. His Dublin congregation increased when on 25 or 29 March 1787, the Cooke Street congregation, with its ex-minister, William Dunne, D.D., joined it.

== In Belfast ==
In October 1789 Bruce was called to the First Belfast congregation, as colleague to James Crombie. He did not accept this call, but on Crombie's death he was again called (11 March 1790) to First Belfast, and at the same time elected Principal of Belfast Academy. His Dublin congregation released him on 18 March.

In the extra-synodical Antrim presbytery, to which his congregation belonged, Bruce became influential. His congregation increased and included leading families of Belfast, increased. He drew up for his congregation a hymn-book in 1801 (enlarged 1818), but while he paid attention to congregational singing he resisted, in 1807, the introduction of an organ. He broke the custom of silent Presbyterian interments by allowing addresses at the grave.

The Belfast Academy mainly owed its reputation to Bruce, who came through the "barring out" student rebellion of 12 April 1792. In the troubles of 1797 and 1798 he enrolled himself as a private in the Belfast Merchants' Infantry, sent his family to Whitehaven, and continued to preach; many of the more liberal Presbyterians had been in favour of the Irish Rebellion of 1798. His influence with the government in 1800 was on the side of adequate consideration for the Presbyterians in the Anglo-Irish Union.

At this period Bruce founded (23 October 1801) the Belfast Literary Society, and his advice was sought by the orthodox leaders of the General Synod of Ulster. In November 1805 there were negotiations for the readmission of his presbytery to the synod without subscription, but in May 1806 the idea was dropped. On the death of Robert Black in 1817, the agency for the regium donum was offered to him, but he put forward the claims of another. He did become involved with the Widows' Fund, founded in 1751 by his great-uncle, William Bruce (1702–1755), and the establishment of a Lancasterian school, with a Protestant but otherwise non-denominational Sunday school.

Bruce penned the address presented to George IV at Dublin (1821) in the name of the whole Presbyterian body. In the preface (dated 17 March) to his Sermons on the Study of the Bible (1824) Bruce claimed that his Unitarian views were "making extensive though silent progress through the general synod of Ulster". This was a challenge to the orthodox, and the general synod at Moneymore, on 2 July, agreed to a public contradiction of the assertion. Bruce joined the seceders of 1829 in the formation of the Unitarian Society for the Diffusion of Christian Knowledge (9 April 1831), though he would have preferred as the colourless name "A Tract Society".

== Last years ==
By 1834 Bruce had retired, and was suffering from a loss of sight, which ended in blindness in November 1836 he moved to Dublin with his daughter Maria, where he died on 27 February 1841.

== Works ==
Bruce published:

- The Christian Soldier, 1803, a sermon.
- Literary Essays on the Influence of Political Revolutions on the Progress of Religion and Learning; and on the Advantages of Classical Education, Belfast, 1811, 2nd edition 1818 (originally published in the Transactions of the Belfast Literary Society, 1809 and 1811).
- A Treatise on the Being and Attributes of God; with an Appendix on the Immateriality of the Soul, Belfast, 1818, (begun in 1808, and finished November 1813).
- Sermons on the Study of the Bible, and on the Doctrines of Christianity, Belfast, 1824, 2nd edition 1826. In the second edition he rated his doctrines as "anti-trinitarian"; in later life he was anxious to have it known that he had not altered his views. He considered himself a Unitarian, though not in the sense of Theophilus Lindsey and Thomas Belsham.
- The State of Society in the Age of Homer, Belfast, 1827.
- Brief Notes on the Gospels and Acts, Belfast, 1835.
- A Paraphrase, with Brief Notes on St. Paul's Epistle to the Romans, Belfast, 1836.
- A Paraphrase and Notes on the Epistles and Apocalypse, Liverpool, 1836.
- A Brief Commentary on the New Testament, Belfast, 1836.

In Presbyterian matters, Bruce preferred the looser administration of the English, and did not favour the presence of lay-elders in church courts. His view of the freedom consistent with Presbyterian discipline was written up in the supplement "by a member of the presbytery of Antrim" to the Newry edition (1816) of Micaiah Towgood's Dissenting Gentleman's Letters.

Besides these works, Bruce contributed papers to the Transactions of the Royal Irish Academy, Belfast Literary Society, Dublin University Magazine and other periodicals. A series of twenty-three historical papers on the "Progress of Nonsubscription to Creeds" went to the Christian Moderator, 1826–8, with extracts from original documents. His "Memoir of James VI", in Transactions of the Royal Irish Academy, 1828, published original letters, and information on his ancestor Robert Bruce of Kinnaird.

== Family ==
Bruce married, on 25 January 1788, Susanna Hutton (died 22 February 1819, aged 56). They had twelve children, of whom six survived him. His son William was also a minister.

== Notes ==
Attribution

This article incorporates text from a publication now in the public domain: Stephen, Leslie, ed. (1886). "Bruce, William (1757-1841)". Dictionary of National Biography. Vol. 7. London: Smith, Elder & Co.

Presbyterian Church titles
| Preceded by John Moody | Minister of Strand Street Presbyterian Church, Dublin; 1782–1790; With: John Moody | Succeeded by John Moody |
| Preceded by James Crombie | Minister of First Presbyterian Church, Rosemary St, Belfast; 1790–1841; With: William Bruce (Junior), 1812–1841; John Scott Porter, 1832–1841 | Succeeded by William Bruce (Junior), 1812–1841; John Scott Porter |
