= Samuel Haliday =

Irish Presbyterian minister

- Born: 16 July 1685 probably Omagh, County Tyrone, Ireland
- Died: 5 March 1739 (aged 53); Belfast, County Antrim, Ireland
- Occupation: Presbyterian minister
- Known for: Leading figure in the Irish "non-subscribing" controversy over the Westminster Confession

Samuel Haliday or Hollyday (1685–1739) was an Irish Presbyterian non-subscribing minister, to the "first congregation" of Belfast.

== Life ==
He was the son of the Rev. Samuel Haliday (or Hollyday) (1637–1724), who was ordained presbyterian minister of Convoy, County Donegal, in 1664; then moved to Omagh in 1677; left for Scotland in 1689, where he was successively minister of Dunscore, Drysdale, and New North Church, Edinburgh; and returning to Ireland in 1692, became minister of Ardstraw, where he continued till his death. Samuel, the son, was born in 1685, probably at Omagh, where his father was then minister. In 1701, he entered Glasgow College, enrolled among the students of the first class under John Loudon, professor of logic and rhetoric. He graduated M.A., and went to Leiden University to study theology (19 November 1705).

In 1706, he was licensed at Rotterdam, and in 1708 received ordination at Geneva, choosing to be ordained there because of its tolerance. He now became chaplain to the Cameronian regiment, serving under the Duke of Marlborough in Flanders. He was received by the Synod of Ulster in 1712 as an ordained minister without charge and declared capable of being settled in any of its congregations. For some time, however, he lived in London, where he associated with the Whig faction, in and out of the government, and used his influence to promote the interests of his fellow-churchmen. He opposed the extension of the Schism Bill to Ireland. In 1718 he took a leading part in obtaining an increase in the regium donum; the synod of Ulster thanked him. Haliday introduced two historians, Laurence Echard and Edmund Calamy, in a London social meeting with Richard Ellys.

In 1719, he was present at the Salters' Hall debates, and in the same year received a call from the first congregation of Belfast, vacant by the death of the Rev. John McBride. He was at this time chaplain to Colonel Anstruther's regiment of foot. It being rumoured that he held Arian views, the synod in June 1720 considered the matter and cleared him. His accuser, the Rev. Samuel Dunlop of Athlone, was rebuked. On 28 July 1720, the day appointed for his installation in Belfast, he refused to subscribe to the Westminster Confession of Faith, making instead a declaration to the presbytery; the presbytery proceeded with the installation, in violation of the law of the church, and the face of a protest and appeal from four members. The case came before the synod in 1721; but though Haliday still refused to sign the Confession, the matter was allowed to drop. A resolution was, however, carried after a long debate that all members of the synod who were willing to subscribe to the confession might do so, with which the majority complied. Hence arose the terms "subscribers" and "non-subscribers". Haliday continued to identify with the latter till his death. A number of members of his congregation were so dissatisfied with the issue of the case that they refused to remain under his ministry. After much opposition they were erected by the synod into a new charge.

The subscription controversy raged for years, Haliday continuing to take a major part in it, both in the synod and through the press. To end the conflict the synod in 1725 adopted the expedient of placing all the non-subscribing ministers in one presbytery, that of Antrim, which in the following year was excluded from the body.

Haliday was a lifelong friend to Francis Hutcheson the philosopher. In 1736, Thomas Drennan was installed as his colleague in Belfast. Haliday died on 5 March 1739 in his fifty-fourth year.

== Works ==
In 1706, whilst at Leiden, Haliday published a theological Disputatio in Latin. The establishment of the seceded Belfast congregation called forth A Letter from the Revs. Messrs. Kirkpatrick and Haliday, Ministers in Belfast, to a Friend in Glasgow, with relation to the new Meeting-house in Belfast, Edinburgh, 1723.

In 1724, he published Reasons against the Imposition of Subscription to the Westminster Confession of Faith, or any such Human Tests of Orthodoxy, together with Answers to the Arguments for such Impositions, pp. xvi and 152, Belfast, 1724. A reply to this was issued by the Rev. Gilbert Kennedy of Tullylish, County Down, Haliday published A Letter to the Rev. Mr. Gilbert Kennedy, occasioned by some personal Reflections, Belfast, 1725, and in the following year A Letter to the Rev. Mr. Francis Iredell, occasioned by his “Remarks” on “A Letter to the Rev. Mr. Gilbert Kennedy,” Belfast, 1726.

Haliday also published A Sermon occasioned by the Death of the Rev. Mr. Michael Bruce, preached at Holywood on 7 Dec. 1735, pp. 35, Belfast, 1735. A correspondence between him and the Rev. James Kirkpatrick of Belfast on the one side, and the Rev. Charles Mastertown, minister of the new congregation there, on the other, over a proposal that the two former and their congregations should communicate along with the hearers of the latter, is in the preface to Kirkpatrick's Scripture Plea, 1724.

== Family ==
Haliday married the widow of Arthur Maxwell, who brought him property; the physician Alexander Henry Haliday was their son.

== Notes ==
Attribution

This article incorporates text from a publication now in the public domain: Hamilton, Thomas (1890). "Haliday, Samuel". In Stephen, Leslie; Lee, Sidney (eds.). Dictionary of National Biography. Vol. 24. London: Smith, Elder & Co. pp. 46–47.

Presbyterian Church titles
Preceded by John McBride (minister)	Minister of First Presbyterian Church, Rosemary St, Belfast; 1720–1739; With: Thomas Drennan, 1736-1739	Succeeded by Thomas Drennan
