= Belfast Royal Academy =

Oldest school in Belfast, Northern Ireland

Coordinates: 54°36′54″N 5°56′20″W

Location
- 5-17 Cliftonville Rd; Belfast, County Antrim, BT14 6JL; Northern Ireland

Information
- Type: Voluntary day grammar school
- Motto: Latin: Per vias sapientiae (Along the roads of wisdom)
- Religious affiliation: Non-denominational
- Established: 1785; 241 years ago
- Founder: James Crombie
- Warden of the Board of Governors: Eric Porter
- Principal: Alistair Anderson
- Gender: Co-educational
- Age: 11 to 18
- Enrolment: 1,450 (approx.)
Houses
Cairns	Currie
Pottinger	Shaw
- Colours: Maroon and& navy
- Publication: The Owl
- Affiliations: HMC
- Website: www.belfastroyalacademy.com

The Belfast Royal Academy (also known as BRA) is the oldest school in the city of Belfast, Northern Ireland. It is a co-educational, non-denominational voluntary grammar school in north Belfast. The Academy is one of 8 schools in Northern Ireland whose Head is a member of the Headmasters' and Headmistresses' Conference.

== History ==
The Academy was founded in 1785 by James Crombie and opened on 1 May 1786. Originally situated near St Anne's Parish Church in what is now Academy Street, it moved to its current location on the Cliftonville Road in 1880. For more than a century the school was named Belfast Academy. On 27 November 1887, Queen Victoria granted permission for the school to style itself Belfast Royal Academy, and its name was officially changed in November 1888.

=== "Barring out" incident ===
On 12 April 1792, a group of schoolboys (eight boarders and two day boys) barricaded themselves in the mathematics classroom. In doing so they "declared war against the masters until their requests should be granted". As they expected to be holed up for some time, they had taken a quantity of provisions from the Academy kitchens; further they managed to arm themselves with 5 pistols and a large quantity of gunpowder and shot. A letter, headed “Liberty Hall”, was sent by the students to their masters in which they stated they would not surrender until their demands had been met. The Academy authorities, in an attempt to break the siege, sent workmen to break down the door and pour water down the chimney, without success, as the boys opened fire on them. Finally the Sovereign of Belfast, William Bristow, was summoned, he read the Riot Act to the boys but failed to end the barring out, and one of the boys opened fire on him.

The siege ended by negotiation between the governors and the boys soon after; the boys, however, refused to show remorse and were later beaten, all leaving the school shortly following their punishment.

=== Admission of girls ===
Originally a boys' school, girls were admitted to the secondary level in 1900 but taught separately. Mixed classes were introduced in 1924.

== Principals ==
No.	Name	Tenure
1	James Crombie	1785–1790
2	William Bruce	1790–1822
3	James Gray	1822–1826)
4	Reuben John Bryce	1826–1880
5	William Collier	1880–1890
6	Thomas W. Foster	1890–1898
7	Thomas R. Collier	1898–1923
8	Alexander Foster	1923–1942
9	John Darbyshire	1943–1968
10	Louis Lord	1968–1980
11	William Sillery	1980–2000
12	William Young	2000–2008
13	Moore Dickson	2009–2017
14	Hilary Woods	2017–2026
15	Alistair Anderson	2026-present

== School emblem ==
The school emblem comprises the rose, the thistle and the shamrock, along with the Royal Coat of Arms of the United Kingdom, the Arms of the City of Belfast and those of the province of Ulster. The three significant dates mark the foundation of the school by James Crombie in 1785, the transfer to the present site in 1880 and the approval by Queen Victoria of the designation Belfast Royal Academy in 1888.

== House system ==
When a pupil enters the Academy they are placed into one of the four houses: Shaw, Currie, Pottinger or Cairns, named after past pupils: James Shaw, Donald Currie, Henry Pottinger, and Hugh Cairns, 1st Earl Cairns, for whom the house colours are yellow, green, red, and blue, respectively; each pupil must wear a tie with a stripe of their house colour on it.

== Honours system ==
As a pupil progresses through the Academy, they can earn honours through excellence in sport and/or the arts. There are minor honours, allowing a pupil to wear a minor honours tie, (green owls) intermediate honours (blue owls) and major honours (gold owls). In addition, a pupil gaining intermediate honours is entitled to wear a black blazer with maroon braid surrounding a golden school badge. A pupil gaining major honours in sport is entitled to wear a distinctive maroon blazer with blue braid and a gold school badge. Pupils who receive major honours in the arts, be it for music, drama, or art & design are entitled to wear a blue blazer with maroon braid and a gold school badge. The honour, e.g. Cricket XI 2004 or Music 2002, is stitched in gold letters under the badge for both intermediate and major honours.

== Preparatory department ==
In 1829, a preparatory department was founded for boys too young to attend the main school; girls were also admitted. The rudiments of reading and grammar were taught, provision additionally being made for moral and physical instruction. The preparatory department migrated, in 1880, with the rest of the school, to a new site on the Cliftonville Road. Rapid expansion by 1926, however, compelled the Board of Governors to purchase Wingfield, a large, detached house, opposite the school; this characterful building, standing in an acre of ground, with an enclosed garden at the rear, housed the kindergarten and preparatory departments until the mid-1960s, when, having sustained bomb damage in the Belfast Blitz, it had become too hazardous for young children. Consequently, in 1965, the preparatory department was transferred to the Castle Grounds, where a new school, Ben Madigan, had been constructed on the site of the school tennis courts, nestled at the foot of Cave Hill (for which Ben Madigan is the historic name). In contrast to the quaint Wingfield, the new building was fashioned in a modernist style, the airy, spacious design helping to foster a stimulating learning environment for the pupils, who fondly recall their positive experiences there.

Demographic shifts in the North Belfast catchment area, coupled with a general economic downturn, and other adverse, external factors over which BRA had no control, forced the eventual closure of Ben Madigan Preparatory School in 2026.

== Extra–curricular activities ==
=== Sports ===
The main sports are rugby for boys, and hockey for girls. Other sports played include cricket, netball, athletics, swimming, cross-country running, badminton, tennis, table-tennis, basketball, and rounders. In addition, pupils can participate in golf, water polo, lifesaving, and gymnastics.

Since the Academy moved to the Cliftonville Road, various sports facilities have been utilised, including Cliftonville Cricket Club, Bladon Drive, Castle Grounds, Belfast Jewish Institute, Shore Road, Ballywonard, and currently Roughfort. The Castle Grounds is used primarily by Ben Madigan Preparatory School, but still hosts some showpiece events. At the main school site, there is also a dedicated sports centre, and a 25-metre swimming pool.

The school has competed consistently, at the highest level, in Ulster Schools' sports. An extremely successful period for sporting achievement was 1960-74, with the 1st XV Rugby team reaching the Ulster Schools' Cup final on five occasions, sharing the trophy three times; the 1st XI Hockey team equalled this record in the Ulster Schoolgirls' Senior Cup, also winning that outright in 1974. The 1967 1st XI Cricket team, featuring three Irish Schools' internationals, is regarded as one of the most accomplished in the history of the school.

==== JC Picken Playing Fields ====
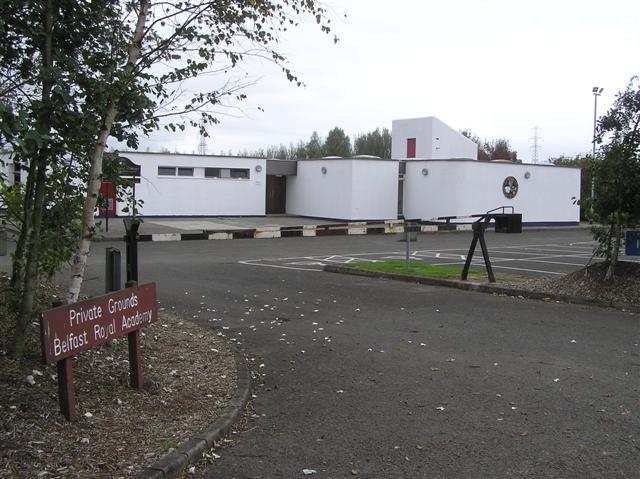
JC Picken Playing Fields in 2009

JC Picken Playing Fields are the main outdoor sports facilities of Belfast Royal Academy, located at Roughfort, near Mallusk, County Antrim, Northern Ireland. The 44-acre site was acquired and developed by the school in 1978 to provide extensive playing space for rugby, hockey, cricket, athletics, and other outdoor activities. Named in honour of former Academy Rugby Football Club President, James C. Picken, the grounds serve as a home venue for the school's competitive fixtures and training sessions, and are a key part of its physical education programme. The complex includes multiple grass pitches, an athletics track, and associated changing facilities. It is also known by the school community, simply as Roughfort, or, more informally, as The Fort.

==== Rugby ====
It was not until the school relocated to the Cliftonville Road, that there were sufficient numbers for organised games to be considered. Although several attempts were made to establish rugby, which had been played as early as the 1880s, the major sport for many years was association football, this preference likely influenced by the proximity of Cliftonville Football Club. In 1923, Alexander Foster, who had been an Ireland international rugby player himself, became Headmaster, and successfully reintroduced rugby to the school. Eventually, in 1935, the school acquired its own playing fields when the picturesquely situated Castle Grounds was purchased from Lord Shaftesbury, in no small part due to the efforts of Alexander Foster; before then, home matches were played at various venues, including Bladon Drive. Additional pitches were procured at Ballywonard in the 1950s, but, notwithstanding that the tenure thereof coincided with an exceptionally successful period for BRA rugby, the environment was deemed too inhospitable, and Ballywonard was superseded in the late 1970s by new sports facilities at Roughfort, where the 1st XV have played their home matches, ever since.

Several former pupils have represented Ireland in rugby at international level: Jack Kyle, Barton McCallan, Sam Hutton, Kenneth Houston, Harry Rea, Rob Saunders, Iain Henderson, Stuart Olding, and Tom Stewart. Jack Kyle, who earned 46 caps at out-half, including all of the 1948 Grand Slam winning matches, is acknowledged as one of Ireland's greatest rugby players. More recently, the world-class Iain Henderson has amassed over 80 caps for Ireland, playing in the back five of the scrum.

Until 1997, an outright win had eluded BRA in the Ulster Schools' Cup. In the final that year, despite adverse playing conditions, the 1st XV produced a solid defensive display, grinding out a tough, but convincing, 12–0 victory against RBAI. Aside from this success, the school has shared the trophy three times, and reached the final on five other occasions.

Ulster Schools' Cup final appearances
Year	Opponent	Score (BRA-Opponent)	Result
1937	Methodist College Belfast	3-5	Lost
1962	Royal Belfast Academical Institution	6-6	Trophy shared
1963	Rainey Endowed School	8-8	Trophy shared
1964	Campbell College	0-0	Trophy shared
1968	Campbell College	0-13	Lost
1972	Ballymena Academy	9-13	Lost
1984	Methodist College Belfast	9-13	Lost
1997	Royal Belfast Academical Institution	12-0	Won
2010	Ballymena Academy	7-10	Lost

Medallion Shield final appearances
Year	Opponent	Score (BRA-Opponent)	Result
1956	Royal Belfast Academical Institution	0-3	Lost
1958	Royal Belfast Academical Institution	0-14	Lost
1962	Methodist College Belfast	0-8	Lost
1965	Royal Belfast Academical Institution	9-0	Won
1967	Annadale Grammar School	0-0	Trophy shared
1968	Coleraine Academical Institution	9-3	Won
1969	Ballymena Academy	5-5	Trophy shared
1973	Methodist College Belfast	3-6	Lost
1978	Coleraine Academical Institution	7-3	Won
1979	Royal Belfast Academical Institution	9-4	Won
1981	Royal Belfast Academical Institution	6-8	Lost
1984	Campbell College	4-6	Lost
1987	Regent House Grammar School	3-11	Lost
1989	Coleraine Academical Institution	3-10	Lost
1992	Royal Belfast Academical Institution	3-30	Lost
1994	Royal School Dungannon	13-17	Lost

== Notable alumni ==
Religious
- William Hamilton Drummond (1778–1865), Presbyterian minister and poet
- William Bruce (1790–1868), Presbyterian minister
- Robert Henry Charles (1855–1931), clergyman and biblical scholar
- Owen Thomas Lloyd Crossley (1860–1926), Bishop of Auckland, 1911–13
- John Ward Armstrong (1915–1987), Dean of St. Patrick's Cathedral, Dublin, 1958–68, Bishop of Cashel, Emly, Waterford and Lismore, 1968–77, Bishop of Cashel and Ossory, 1977–80, and Archbishop of Armagh and Primate of All Ireland, 1980–86
- Robin Eames, Baron Eames of Armagh (born 1937), Archbishop of Armagh and Primate of All Ireland, 1986–2006
Academia and science
- Alexander Mitchell (1780–1868), blind civil engineer and inventor of the screw-pile lighthouse
- James Lawson Drummond (1783–1853), professor of anatomy and medical physiology, Royal Belfast Academical Institution, 1819–49
- John Thomas Romney Robinson (1792–1882), director, Armagh Observatory, 1823–1882
- Robert Patterson (1802–1872), naturalist
- Sir James Emerson Tennent (1804–1869), politician and traveller
- Thomas Andrews (1813–1885), professor of chemistry, Queen's College, Belfast, 1845–1879, and physician
- Bowman Malcolm (1854–1933), railway, civil and mechanical engineer
- Denis Weaire, (born 1942), Erasmus Smith's Professor of Natural and Experimental Philosophy, Trinity College Dublin, and physicist
- James Stirling, provost of Imperial College London and former Jacksonian Professor of Natural Philosophy, University of Cambridge
- Stephen D. M. Brown, director of the Medical Research Council (MRC) Mammalian Genetics Unit, MRC Harwell at Harwell Science and Innovation Campus
- Dame Nicola Brewer, vice-provost (international) University College London; British High Commissioner to South Africa 2009–2013
- Ian White, master of Jesus College, Cambridge, van Eck Professor of Engineering, and deputy vice-chancellor University of Cambridge
- Geoffrey Beattie, professor of psychology
- Paul Seawright (born 1965), photographer and Deputy Vice-Chancellor Ulster University
Politics
- Lieutenant-General Sir Henry Pottinger (1789–1856), envoy and plenipotentiary to China, 1840–43, first Governor of Hong Kong, 1843–44, and Governor of Madras, 1847–54
- Hugh Cairns, 1st Earl Cairns (1819–1885), Lord Chancellor, 1868, 1874–80
- Joseph Gillis Biggar (1828–1890), Irish Home Rule MP for County Cavan, 1874–90
- James Bryce, 1st Viscount Bryce (1838–1922), jurist, historian and politician
- Kate Hoey (born 1946), Minister for Sport, 1998–2001, MP for Vauxhall, 2001–2019
- Basil McCrea UUP member of the Northern Ireland Assembly
- Nelson McCausland DUP member of the Northern Ireland Assembly and Minister of Culture, Arts and Leisure 2009–
- Samuel MacCurdy Greer (1810–1880), MP for County Londonderry 1857–59
- Sir Francis Evans (1897–1983), ambassador to Israel, 1952–54, ambassador to Argentina, 1954–57, and agent for the Government of Northern Ireland in London, 1962–66
Law
- Sir Samuel Ferguson (1810–1886), poet, barrister and antiquarian
- John Atkinson, Baron Atkinson (1844–1932), Lord of Appeal in Ordinary
- Sir Donald Murray (born 1923), Lord Justice of Appeal of the Supreme Court of Northern Ireland
- Sir Paul Girvan (born 1948), Lord Justice of Appeal of the Supreme Court of Northern Ireland
Business
- George Benn (1801–1882), historian of Belfast, and distiller
- Sir William Ewart (1817–1889), linen manufacturer
- John Mulholland, 1st Baron Dunleath (1819–1895), textile manufacturer
- Sir Donald Currie (1825–1909), founder and owner, Castle Shipping Line, 1862–1900, and Union-Castle Line, 1900–09, and politician
- Samuel Cunningham (1862–1946), businessman and senator of the Parliament of Northern Ireland, 1921–45
- Sir Myles Humphreys (1925–1998), bus manufacturer, engineer, and Lord Mayor of Belfast
Media and arts
- Abeer MacIntyre (born 1964), journalist, broadcaster and charity worker
- Charles Williams (1838–1904), first editor, Evening Standard, 1860–63, first editor, Evening News, 1881–84, and war correspondent
- Douglas Gageby (1918–2004), editor, Evening Press, 1954–63, and editor, Irish Times, 1963–86
- John Cole (1927–2013), political editor, BBC, 1981–92
- Ali McMordie (born 1959), musician, founding member of Stiff Little Fingers
- William Crawley, BBC radio and television presenter
- Peter Dickson, (born 1957), radio presenter, television announcer
- Tony Macaulay (writer) (born 1963) Northern Ireland author, leadership consultant, peace builder and broadcaster
Sport
- Jack Kyle (1926-2014), Ireland and British Lion rugby union player
- Marty Smyth, professional poker player
- Iain Henderson (born 1992), British and Irish Lion and Ireland rugby union player
- Stuart Olding (born 1993), Ireland rugby union player
- Rob Saunders (born 1968), Ireland rugby union player
- Henry Morgan (1907-1987), Ireland first-class cricketer
- Stephen Warke (born 1959), Ireland first-class cricketer
- Danielle Hill (born 1999), Ireland swimmer
- Christine McMahon (born 1992), Ireland athlete
- Andy Reid (born 1994), Motorcycle racer
- Max Burton (born 2001), cricketer
- Tom Stewart (born 2001), Ireland rugby union player
- Tom McKibbin (born 2002), golfer
- Barton McCallan (born 1936), Ireland rugby union player
- Sam Hutton (born c. 1940), Ireland rugby union player
- Kenneth Houston (born 1941), Ireland rugby union player
- Harry Rea (born 1946), Ireland rugby union player
Military
- P. Dean McFadden (born 1957), vice-admiral Royal Canadian Navy
- Sir 'Timo' Anderson, RAF, air marshal and former director general of the Military Aviation Authority
- Major General Sir Eric Girdwood (1876–1963), commandant of the Royal Military College Sandhurst and General Officer Commanding Northern Ireland District
- Brigadier Nigel Beacom (born 1958), British Army Reserve officer, Deputy Lieutenant of Somerset, former aide-de-camp to the Queen, and recipient of the Queen’s Volunteer Reserves Medal.
Others
- Peter Scott (1931-2013), burglar
