= Robert Black (minister) =

Irish Presbyterian minister

- Born: 1752
- Died: 4 December 1817 (aged 64–65)
- Occupation: Presbyterian minister

Robert Black (1752 – 4 December 1817) was an Irish Presbyterian minister.

== Biography ==
Black was born in 1752. He was the eldest son of Valentine Black, a farmer at Mullabrack, co. Armagh. In 1770 he entered the class of ethics under Dr. Thomas Reid at Glasgow. He was licensed by the Armagh presbytery and declined in 1776 a call to Keady, co. Armagh, and in the following year, on the death of Alexander Colville, M.D., the non-subscribing minister of Dromore, co. Down, he accepted the call of this congregation, which returned to the jurisdiction of the general Synod of Ulster. Black was ordained at Dromore by the Armagh presbytery on 18 June 1777. On 15 February 1782, he attended the convention of Irish volunteers at Dungannon as captain, Robert Black, and seconded the resolution adopted in favour of catholic emancipation. Like other ministers of that date, he sometimes preached in regimentals, and with drumhead for bookrest. He attended also the second great Dungannon convention on 8 September 1783, when his eloquence attracted the attention of Frederick Augustus, earl of Bristol and bishop of Derry, and Robert Moore of Molenan near Derry. Hence his call to First Derry, where he was installed by the Derry presbytery on 7 January 1784 as colleague to David Young. On 2 December 1788, he was elected synod agent for the Regium Donum, in succession to James Laing. He delivered an applauded oration at the centenary commemoration (7 Dec. 1788) of the closing of the gates of Derry. As an agent for the royal bounty, he exerted himself to secure its augmentation; in 1792, with the help of the Earl of Charlemont, Henry Grattan, and Colonel Stewart of Killymoon, the Irish parliament passed a favourable resolution, and 500l. a year was added to the grant, thus increasing the dividend from about 10l. to 32l. (Irish currency). In gratitude for his services, the synod in 1793 presented Black with a piece of plate. The seditious tendencies now beginning to appear in the volunteer movement excited his alarm, and he delivered a solemn warning against them in a speech at a meeting of the parishioners of Templemore held in Derry Cathedral on 14 Jan. 1793 (see abstract in Belfast News-Letter, 25 Jan. 1793). He never, however, receded from the positions he had taken in favour of parliamentary reform and catholic emancipation. In the rebellion of 1798, he was strongly on the side of constituted authority and had great influence as the friend and correspondent of Castlereagh. One form in which this influence was exercised was a further increase of the regium donum, which from 1804 was distributed in three classes (100l., 75l., and 50l.), the agent being henceforth appointed not by the synod but by the government. Black held this office till his death and did not scruple to use the power it gave him. Opponents called him ‘the unmitred bishop’ and ‘chief consul of the general synod.’ In 1800 or 1801 the degree of D.D. was sent him by an American college. As a speaker, he had no equal in his day. In theology, he was strongly suspected of heresy, a view which is countenanced by the fact that in 1804 he endeavoured to secure as his colleague William Porter, whose Arianism was openly known. His local prestige was impaired by the circumstances of Castlereagh's defeat at the county Down election of 1805, but his influence at Dublin Castle was equally strong with all ministries. In 1809 the synod publicly thanked him for his exertions in procuring the act of parliament incorporating the widows’ fund. In 1813 his controversy with William Steele Dickson, D.D., one of the chief victims of the rebellion of 1798, was ended by a synodical resolution declaring that words in a previous resolution (1799), complained of by Dickson, had been ‘inaccurately used;’ but Black's influence was still powerful enough to cause the expulsion of an elder who, in the course of debate, had laid charges against him in connection with the bounty. Black was a strong opponent of the establishment of the Belfast Academical Institution (opened 1814); at the synod of 1815, in Black's absence from ill-health, a resolution was passed in its favour; in the same year, government made the institution an annual grant of 1,500l. Next year the grant was withdrawn on political grounds, but Black vainly endeavoured, in two successive years, to procure the rescinding of the synod's resolution. His defeat was softened by a not very successful public dinner, given by his admirers in Belfast. Black was a man whose ambition could not brook repulses; his temperament alternated between geniality and gloom. Loss of leadership unhinged his spirit. He threw himself over the railing of Derry Bridge and was drowned in the Foyle, on the evening of 4 December 1817. His body appears to have been filched from its grave.

There is a curious caricature engraving of Black in ‘The Patriotic Miscellany’ 1805, a collection of squibs relating to the Down election of that year. It represents him as a short corpulent man, with a. large head and strong profile. He had married his cousin, Margaret Black (who died in April 1824), and left three sons and two daughters. He published: 1. ‘A Catechism.’ 2. ‘Substance of Two Speeches delivered at the Meeting of Synod in 1812, with an Abstract of the Proceedings relative to the Rev. Dr. Dickson,’ Dublin. 1812.
