= Non-subscribing Presbyterian Church of Ireland =

Irish Christian denomination

- The official logo of the Non-subscribing Presbyterian Church of Ireland
- Classification: Protestant
- Orientation: Presbyterian/Liberal Christianity
- Polity: Presbyterian
- Moderator: Rev. Alistir Bell
- Associations: Irish Council of Churches, European Liberal Protestant Network, International Association for Religious Freedom
- Region: Northern Ireland, Ireland
- Origin: 1910
- Merger of: Presbytery of Antrim with Remonstrant Synod of Ulster
- Congregations: 34
- Members: 4,000
- Official website: http://www.nspresbyterian.org/

The Non-subscribing Presbyterian Church of Ireland is a non-creedal Christian denomination, which maintains a great emphasis on individual conscience in matters of Christian faith. Today, the denomination has thirty-four congregations (thirty-three churches) on the island of Ireland, divided into two Presbyteries and one synod, with a total of about four thousand members. The denomination currently has twenty-five ministers on its roll with both women and men serving as ministers. The NSCPI is also a member of the International Association for Religious Freedom. It has also recorded year-on-year growth in recent years.

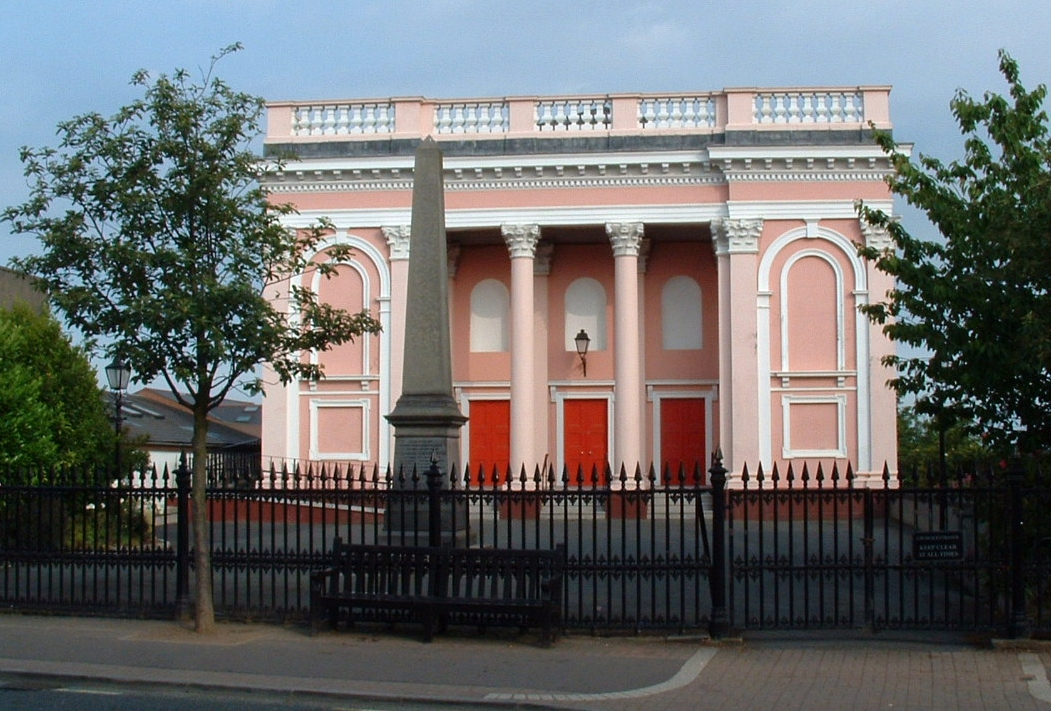
Holywood First Non-subscribing Presbyterian

Non-subscribing Presbyterians continue to maintain a strong commitment to the worship of God, the person of Christ, and the centrality of Scripture. This is in accordance with 'The Constitution and Code of Discipline' (1997) of the denomination, which states:

"That the Scriptures of the Old and New Testament are the rule of Christian Faith and Duty under the teaching of our Lord Jesus Christ" and "That it is the inalienable right of every Christian to search these records of Divine Truth for his instruction and guidance, to form his own opinions with regard to what they teach and to worship God in sincerity, agreeably to the dictates of his conscience, without privation, penalty or inconvenience by his fellow-men."

Whilst it continues, for historic reasons, friendly relations with the Unitarian and Free Christian General Assembly, it does not share the latter's 'post-Christian' outlook and remains firmly part of the Christian family of faith. In common with most Protestant churches they affirm the two Biblical Sacraments of communion and baptism. Baptism is usually performed using the wording from Matthew 28, and this usage has increased in many places in recent years.

The Non-Subscribing Presbyterian Church of Ireland is a founder of, and active within, the Irish Council of Churches and the European Liberal Protestant Network (ELPN). The Church became part of the General Assembly of Unitarian and Free Christian Churches on its foundation in 1928, although it is now recognised under the terms of the 2010 Accord with the General Assembly as an independent and fully functioning denomination in its own right.

== History ==
The Church has its origins with early 18th-century Presbyterian ministers who refused to subscribe at their ordination to the Westminster Confession, a standard Reformed (Calvinist) statement of faith; and who were placed, in 1725, in the Presbytery of Antrim. A similar disagreement led to the creation of the Remonstrant Synod of Ulster in 1830. In 1835 the two bodies together with the Synod of Munster formed the Association of Irish Non-subscribing Presbyterians. However, the foundation of the earliest of Irish Presbyterian congregations predates the formulation of the Westminster Confession, and the congregations of the Synod of Munster never subscribed to this. When the Presbytery of Antrim was formed, it received support from the Synod of Munster. As the eighteenth century progressed, the attitude to subscription within the Synod of Ulster became more relaxed.

The Non-subscribing Presbyterian Church of Ireland (NSPCI) was consolidated in 1910 when the Presbytery of Antrim, the Remonstrant Synod of Ulster, and those congregations that had formed the Free Congregational Union (a radical group made up of a few congregations who had left the Remonstrant Synod or the Presbytery of Antrim) for a few years, formed the General Synod. By 1910 only three congregations of the original Synod of Munster remained in the south of Ireland. Although (like all the elements that came to form the General Synod in 1910) the Synod of Munster was and remained a member of the Association of Irish Non-subscribing Presbyterians, it did not formally join the General Synod until 1935.

== Statement of uniting principles ==
Evolution of the Presbyterian churches in Ulster

The Non-subscribing Presbyterian Church of Ireland has a statement of uniting principles, which are:

"We declare allegiance to the principle that:

- The teaching of Christ must take precedence over the doctrines of a later time, and
- Christian unity is to be sought, not in the uniformity of creed but in a common standard of duty and adherence to the commandments set out in the Bible.

Our faith:

- is governed by the Scriptures of the Old and New Testaments of the Bible
- asserts and upholds the right of every individual to search these scriptural records for themselves and to use reason and personal conscience to discover God’s Divine Truth
- removes Human Tests and Confessions of Faith that restrict private judgment and prevent free enquiry
- upholds the beautiful simplicity of the great commandments as defined by Jesus Christ: “You must love the Lord your God with all your heart, with all your soul and all your mind” and “You must love your neighbour as yourself.”

== Structure ==
The denomination is constituted of two Presbyteries and one synod: the Presbytery of Antrim with 16 churches, the Presbytery of Bangor with 13 churches, and the Synod of Munster with four churches. The denomination publishes its own monthly magazine called Inspiration. The Unitarian churches of Dublin and Cork publish a monthly magazine titled Oscailt.

== Presbytery of Antrim ==
In 1725, the Synod of Ulster formed a new Presbytery of Antrim, consisting of the following 16 congregations:

- Aghadowey - John Elder - the congregation rejoined the Synod of Ulster after his resignation in or before 1773
- Ahoghill - Thomas Shaw - the congregation rejoined the Synod of Ulster after his death in 1731
- Antrim - John Abernethy
- Ballyclare - Thomas Wilson
- 1st Belfast - Samuel Haliday
- 2nd Belfast - James Kirkpatrick
- Cairncastle - William Taylor
- Comber - John Orr - the current non-subscribing congregation was not founded until 1838
- Downpatrick - Thomas Nevin
- Dromore - Alexander Colville (died 1719)
- Dundalk - Patrick Simpson - the congregation rejoined the Synod of Ulster after his death in or before 1779
- Duneane - John Henderson - the congregation rejoined the Synod of Ulster after his death in 1753
- Holywood - Michael Bruce
- Larne - Josias Clugston
- Moira - Samuel Harpur - the congregation rejoined the Synod of Ulster after his death in or before 1731
- Newtownards - John Mears

Newtownlimavady, under Joseph Osborne, is included in a list given by James Armstrong in A summary history of the Presbyterian churches in the City of Dublin. However, William Dool Killen in History of the congregations of the Presbyterian Church in Ireland states that Osborne's ordination by the Presbytery of Antrim occurred after 1740. He and his congregation joined the Synod of Ulster in 1743.

== See also ==
- Free Christians (Britain)

=== Other Presbyterian denominations in Ireland ===
- Free Presbyterian Church of Ulster
- Presbyterian Church in Ireland
- Reformed Presbyterian Church of Ireland
- Evangelical Presbyterian Church
