= List of Irish Presbyterians =

The following are notable Irish Presbyterians from a variety of different Presbyterian denominations in Ireland.

== Clergy ==
- John Abernethy, 18th-century Presbyterian minister and advocate for religious freedom.
- John Alexander, linguist and patristic scholar.
- J. B. Armour, Presbyterian minister who supported Home Rule.
- John Baird, Old Testament scholar.
- John Bankhead, published a catechism that differed from the Westminster Shorter Catechism.
- Samuel Barber, former moderator and advocate of catholic emancipation.
- William Boyd, petitioned the governor of Province of Massachusetts Bay with a proposal for emigration.
- William Bruce, grandson of Michael Bruce, minister and educator.
- Stafford Carson, former Principal at Union Theological College and former moderator.
- Henry Cooke, 19th-century Presbyterian minister.
- Martyn C. Cowan, lecturer in Historical Theology at the Union Theological College.
- Thomas Croskery, theologian and reviewer.
- James E. Davey, theologian and historian, acquitted of heresy charges in 1927, elected moderator in 1951.
- Ray Davey, founder of the Corrymeela Community.
- Samuel Davidson, first professor of biblical criticism at Belfast College, subsequently a Congregationalist.
- William Steel Dickson, minister and member of the Society of the United Irishmen.
- John Dunlop, CBE, former moderator (1992), a leading participant in Northern Ireland's civic life.
- John Edgar, professor of theology, moderator and Honorary Secretary to the Presbyterian Home Mission during the Famine in 1847.
- William Gibson, professor of Christian Ethics and former moderator.
- Hugh Hanna, evangelist, Orangeman and Unionist.
- James Alexander Hamilton Irwin, Presbyterian Home Ruler who converted to the republican cause post-1916. Appointed to the Fianna Fáil led the government's Commission on Vocational Organisation from 1939 to 1943 and later joined the party and served on the Fianna Fáil national executive from 1945 until his death.
- William Dool Killen, church historian.
- John Kinnear, Member of Parliament for County Donegal, first clergyman to be elected to the House of Commons.
- Francis Makemie, Irish Presbyterian immigrant to America; moderator of the first Presbytery in America.
- Charles McMullen, former moderator of the Presbyterian Church in Ireland.
- John Morrow, co-founder of the Corrymeela Community.
- Trevor Morrow, Presbyterian minister of Lucan Presbyterian Church in Dublin, former moderator.
- Ken Newell, peacemaker and former moderator.
- Isaac Nelson, Irish Nationalist politician and advocate of home rule whose views were condemned by the moderator of the time.
- W. P. Nicholson, evangelist.
- Robert James Patterson, social reformer and founder of Catch-My-Pal Total Abstinence Union.
- Ruth Patterson, first woman to be ordained to the ministry of the Presbyterian Church in Ireland.
- James Seaton Reid, church historian.
- David J. Templeton, murdered after press coverage regarding purchase of gay pornography.
- Robert Watts, conservative theologian and missionary in Philadelphia.

== Laypeople ==
- Robert Anderson, second Assistant Commissioner (Crime) of the London Metropolitan Police.
- Samuel Bill, founder of the Qua Iboe Mission (later renamed Mission Africa).
- Thomas Blood, self-styled colonel who attempted theft of the Crown jewels.
- Amy Carmichael, missionary in India who opened an orphanage and founded a mission in Dohnavur.
- James Dickey, active in the Society of the United Irishmen and hanged for role at the Battle of Antrim.
- Jeffrey Donaldson, Northern Irish politician and leader of the Democratic Unionist Party.
- Robert Emmet, United Irishman and revolutionary leader.
- David Ford, politician and former leader of the Alliance Party.
- James Galway, flautist.
- Watty Graham, executed for his role as a United Irishman in the Rebellion of 1798.
- James Hope, radical democrat organised for the Society of the United Irishmen.
- Heather Humphreys, Fine Gael politician and government Minister.
- Arthur Langford, Anglo-Irish lawyer and politician.
- Hercules Langford, Anglo-Irish baronet, merchant and landowner.
- Naomi Long, Northern Irish politician and leader of the Alliance Party.
- Robert Wilson Lynd, Irish nationalist. editor of poetry and essayist.
- Mary Ann McCracken, social activist and campaigner.
- Henry Joy McCracken, leading member of the United Irishmen and rebel commander.
- Isabel Deane Mitchell, medical missionary in China.
- William Orr, member of the United Irishmen who was executed in 1797.
- Edwin Poots, Northern Irish politician and former leader of the Democratic Unionist Party.
- Morris S. Seale, scholar and theologian.
- William R. Rodgers, radio broadcaster, script writer and former Presbyterian minister.
- John Skeffington, 2nd Viscount Massereene, Anglo-Irish politician, official, and peer.
- Robert Stewart, Viscount Castlereagh, Anglo-Irish politician and statesman.
- Jacob Stockdale, professional Irish rugby player.
- John Tennant, militant member of the Society of the United Irishmen.
- Billy Wright, loyalist paramilitary leader and lay preacher in the Free Presbyterian Church.
