= Davey (surname) =

Davey is a surname. Notable people with the surname include:

== A ==
- Aaron Davey, Australian rules footballer (Melbourne Demons)
- Alan Davey (civil servant), chief executive of the Arts Council England
- Alan Davey (musician) (born 1963), former bassist with Hawkwind
- Alfred Davey (New Zealand politician) (1894–1982), New Zealand politician of the National Party
- Alwyn Davey, Australian rules footballer (Essendon Bombers)

== B ==
- Basil Davey (1897–1959), British commandant of the Royal Military College of Science

== C ==
- Cathy Davey (born 1979), Irish singer-songwriter
- Charlie Davey (cyclist) (1887–1964), a British racing cyclist
- Charlie Davey (footballer) (1908–1991), a former Australian rules footballer
- Charles Davey (Nebraska politician) (1909–1989), American politician from Nebraska
- Charles Pierce Davey (1925–2002), American boxer and boxing commissioner
- Claude Davey (1908–2001), Wales international rugby player
- Clive Davey (1932–2021), English cricketer
- Con Davey, Northern Irish footballer

== D ==
- Daniel Lloyd Davey (born 1973), better known as Dani Filth, the lead singer of Cradle of Filth
- Sir David Penry-Davey (1942–2015), judge of the High Court of England and Wales
- Dick Davey (born 1942), an American college basketball coach
- Ditch Davey (born 1975), an Australian actor
- Don Davey (born 1968), a former American football defensive tackle in the National Football League

== E ==
- Edith Mary Davey (1867–1953), British artist
- Sir Edward Davey (born 1965), British politician
- Edward Henry Davey (1854–1911), architect and politician

== F ==
- Ray Davey (footballer), New Zealand footballer
- Felicity Davey, Australian newsreader
- Frankland Wilmot Davey (born 1940), Canadian poet and scholar
- Frederick Hamilton Davey (1868–1915), amateur botanist
- Frederick Davey (1847–1926), English-born political figure in British Columbia

== G ==
- Geoffrey Davey (1906–1975), Australian civil engineer and priest
- Gerry Davey (1914–1977), English ice hockey player
- Gilbert Davey (1913–2011), British writer and radio enthusiast
- Grenville Davey (1961–2022), English sculptor and winner of the 1992 Turner Prize

== H ==
- Horace Davey, Baron Davey (1833–1907), British Lord of Appeal in Ordinary

== I ==
- Ian Davey (born 1986), British rugby union player

== J ==
- J. Charles Davey (1869–1935), American Jesuit educator
- Jack Davey (cricketer) (born 1944), English cricketer
- James Davey (rugby union) (1880–1951), British rugby union player
- James Davey (rugby league) (born 1989), English rugby league player
- James E. Davey (1890–1960), Irish Presbyterian minister, historian and theologian
- John Davey (disambiguation), multiple people
- Josh Davey (born 1990), Scottish cricketer

== K ==
- Kenneth Davey, British academic
- Krista Davey (born 1978), American women's soccer player
- Keath Davey, (born in Ierlind 1973) C.E.O of Marino Software

== M ==
- Mark Wing-Davey (born 1948), British actor and director
- Martin L. Davey (1884–1946), American politician
- Maude Davey (born 1963 or 1964), Australian stage, television, and film actress
- Mike Davey (baseball) (born 1952), American baseball player

== P ==
- Phillip Davey VC MM (1896–1953), Australian recipient of the Victoria Cross
- Philip Davey (cricketer) (1913–2000), English cricketer

== R ==
- Ray Davey (1915–2012), Northern Ireland Presbyterian minister
- Ray Davey (footballer), New Zealand footballer
- Richard Davey (disambiguation), multiple people
- Robert C. Davey (1853–1908), American politician
- Robin Davey (born 1975), English musician, record producer, musical director and photographer

== S ==
- Seamus Davey-Fitzpatrick (born 1998), American child actor
- Shaun Davey (born 1948), Irish composer
- Simon Davey (born 1970), Welsh former footballer and football manager
- Spencer Davey (born 1983), English rugby union player
- Stan Davey (1922–2010), Australian Aboriginal rights activist
- Steve Davey (born 1948), English footballer

== T ==
- Thomas Davey (governor) (c. 1758–1823), Lieutenant Governor of Van Diemens Land
- Thomas Davey (New Zealand politician) (1856–1934), New Zealand politician
- Tom Davey (baseball) (born 1973), American baseball player
- Trevor Davey (1926–2012), New Zealand politician

== V ==
- Valerie Davey (born 1940), British politician
