= Archibald Heron =

Archibald Heron may refer to:

- Archie Heron, Irish politician and trade unionist
- Archibald Heron (rugby union), Irish international rugby union player
