= Lycia (disambiguation) =

Lycia is a former geopolitical region in Anatolia.

Lycia may also refer to:

== Species ==
- Lycia (moth), a genus of moths in the family Geometridae
- Lycia (butterfly), an invalid name for the butterfly genus Lycaena

== People ==
- Lycia Naff (born 1962), American actress and journalist
- Lycia Trouton, artist from Northern Ireland

== Other ==
- Lycia (band), a dark wave band
- The League of Lycia, a fictional confederation of states from the video game Fire Emblem
- Lycia, Cunard cargo ship;

== See also ==
- Lycian (disambiguation)
