= Sectarian violence in Iraq =

Violence between different ethnic and/or religious sects in Iraq

Sectarian violence in Iraq refers to the conflict that had developed in the aftermath of the 2003 invasion of Iraq as a result of rising sectarian tensions between the different religious and ethnic groups of Iraq, most notably the conflict between extremist Shi'ite groups and extremist Sunni groups, which escalated into a full-scale civil war between 2006 until 2008, and had largely ceased following the defeat of ISIS in 2017 during the 2013–2017 war in Iraq.

According to most sources, including the CIA's World Factbook, the majority of Iraqis are Shi'i Arab Muslims amounting to around 64% to 69% of the population, whereas Sunni Muslims represent between 32% and 37% of the population. Furthermore, both Sunnis and Shias are split ethnically among Arabs, Kurds and Turkmen.

== Historical background ==
Before the creation of the Iraqi state, Iraq's territory belonged to the Ottoman Empire as Ottoman Iraq and was divided up into three vilayets (provinces): Baghdad Vilayet (1869–1918), Basra Vilayet (1884–1918) and Mosul Vilayet (1878–1918). Together, these three vilayets were home to a wide variety of different ethnic and religious groups which all lived in relative tolerance under Ottoman rule, although the Shi'i community was largely excluded from administrative positions and the army. After the First World War, the population of the three vilayets were unified into one nation-state under the British Mandate. In line with the ‘Sharifan Solution’, the British appointed a Sunni Arab as king: Faisal I of Iraq. Zoe Preston states that this decision to back Sunni Arab political leadership, despite being a minority in Iraq, created an exclusion of other religious and ethnic groups.

With the state of Iraq granted independence in 1932, the struggle to create an Iraqi national identity became more apparent. Although Faisal I repeatedly tried to bring cultural values and practices of Shi'ites, Sunnis and other populations together within the context of Pan-Arabism, the outcome was a more visible distinction between the ethnic and religious groups of Iraq. Many Shi'i Arabs opposed Pan-Arabism because of their fear for marginalization while many Kurds opposed Pan-Arabism because of their demand for an independent Kurdish state. So on the one hand, Shi'ites, Kurds and other sects refused to give up their cultural values and practices. While on the other hand, the Sunnis in power tried to abolish these values and practices in cohesion with Pan-Arabism. Eventually, this led to a clearer consolidation of the different communities which resulted in the enhancement of division among Iraq's population. Kurds were wary of Arab domination from the central authority in Baghdad. Furthermore, Iraq's independence and the struggle to create a national identity resulted in different unsuccessful tribal uprisings and clashes in the 1930s. Yet, the government repeatedly managed to knock down the riots and maintain its hegemony.

The first official documented attempt to outline sectarian frustrations after the establishment of the Iraqi state came with the Najaf Charter document in 1935. In this 12-point manifesto, a group of Shi'i lawyers expressed their discontent about sectarian discrimination against the majority of the Shi'ite population and called for the appointment of Shi'i judges and courts in predominantly Shi'ite areas and development projects throughout the country, especially in the south. Although this manifesto was the first effort to present the sectarian elite with political frustrations, aspirations, and demands of the Shi'ites, they remained unheard.

After 1932, the Iraqi government kept expanding its bureaucracy, increasing Sunni control over the state's machinery. Although greater control of the government meant fewer uprisings and rioting, sectarian tensions among the Iraqi population kept growing. These sectarian tensions were supplemented with a very stark unequal wealth distribution between the urban elite and the rural population. These different tensions eventually resulted in the 14 July Revolution of 1958 in which the Hashemite monarchy was overthrown by a group of army officers under the leadership of General Abd al-Karim Qasim who then founded the Republic of Iraq. Having a mixed Sunni-Shi'i background, General Abd al-Karim Qasim abolished the practice of limiting Shi'ites and peoples with other ethnic backgrounds into the military. Although this measure made him partly popular, sectarian tensions with the Kurdish population of Iraq developed into a violent conflict which started in 1961 after Qassim was unable to fulfill his promise of Kurdish national rights. Furthermore, his implementation of land reforms and reforms regarding family law undermined the power of religious leaders and landlords, meaning that tension between his regime and religious leaders increased.

These tensions, along with disagreement within the government on whether to pursue an Iraqi nationalist or Pan-Arabist agenda, eventually resulted in the bloody overthrowing of the Qassim regime in February 1963, also known as the Ramadan Revolution. After various bloody street battles between primarily the Shi'i working class and Ba'athist militias, a variety of Arab Nationalist army officers, primarily Sunni-affiliated officers, took over power. Of them, the pan-Arabist Abdul Salam Arif became president. However, his power was constantly challenged by members of his cabinet who opted for a more sectarian and violent trajectory and were members of the Ba'ath Party. In order to appease these elements, loyalties of communalism and sectarianism were thus restored under Arif's presidency, as well as the political power of Sunni Arab nationalists. Sectarian policies thus remained in place and further enhanced sectarian and inter-communal tensions. Within this tense atmosphere, different officers and cliques planned military coups to overthrow Arif's rule and seize power. Eventually, in a bloodless coup in 1968, the Ba’ath Party seized power for the second time in a decade.

== Anti-sectarian efforts under Ba'ath rule ==
With the resurrection of power to the Ba’ath Party, Iraq entered a new stage of nation-building. This included two main strategies of cultivating national identity under Ba’ath rule throughout the 1970s and 80s. The first strategy was to enhance social integration through the success of state-sponsored development programs, which were made possible by the growth of the Iraqi economy. In the 1970s, the government nationalized Iraq's oil industry and, with the revenues from the export of this oil, Iraq started a project of modernization and nation-building. In addition to investments in infrastructure and industry, the Iraqi government also launched a program to invest in basic public goods such as schools, universities, and hospitals. By doing this, Iraq developed into a welfare state: citizens throughout the country benefitted from economic advancement, rising incomes and social mobility, regardless of their ethnic, tribal or religious background.

This links to the second strategy which was to de-emphasize sectarian identity. Ba'ath ideology can be categorized as a Pan-Arabist ideology with a clear socialist component. In line with this ideology, the Iraqi Ba'ath Party advocated a focus on an Iraqi nationalist identity with no room for sectarian affiliations. As a result, the party downplayed any religious affiliations and instead pursued a secular, nationalist Iraq. Later, under the leadership of Saddam Hussein, this nationalist Iraq was to be based on a common Mesopotamian past in order to incorporate both the Shi'ite and Kurdish population into the project of nationalist state-building.

== Sectarian violence at the beginning of Ba’ath rule ==
In line with its nationalist nature, the Ba’ath party managed to include different ethnic and religious groups in their governmental system after 1968. And while Shi'i Arabs and Kurds did not reach the highest levels of political power, they still managed to reach high levels of influence within the regime. However, with the rising influence of Saddam Hussein during the 1970s, he came to appoint tribal and regional allies to the most influential positions within the government. Whereas the Ba'ath party thus tried to emphasise a common national identity at the expense of communal sectarian identities, the policies of building on a small circle of trusted allies by both Ahmed Hassan al-Bakr and his successor Saddam Hussein, caused a rift between the national emphasis of the Ba'ath party and their own communal interests.

From the 1970s onwards, sectarian tensions brewed underneath the surface and sectarian opposition and violence began to occur and were at times highly vocal. Primarily a vast majority of the Shi'ites were discontent about their governmental exclusion. Although the Ba'ath propagated the abolishment of sectarian ideologies and the inclusion of different sects in the military and other governmental institutions, by 1977 only Sunni tribal figures close to Hussein maintained positions in the Revolutionary Command Council, the highest form of authority. Furthermore, the Kurdish population also felt marginalized by the Ba'ath. Towards the end of the 1960s, the Ba'ath Party started an Arabization campaign of Northern Iraq in order to secure the north's loyalty. This meant that many Kurdish families were displaced and replaced with Arab families. An example of clear violent sectarian opposition to such policies is the Second Iraqi-Kurdish War which took place in 1974 and 1975, when different Kurdish rebel groups unsuccessfully tried to gain independence in Northern Iraq by initiating riots. During the same period, the Shi'ite Da’wa party gained popularity in Iraq. After its establishment in 1970, party activists initiated different riots, most noteworthy the riots in 1974 and 1977.

Because of its military supremacy and resources, the Ba'ath regime was able to quickly crackdown on such riots with a sectarian character. From the start, the Ba'ath regime had established tight control over Iraq's population. All those considered unloyal, were manoeuvred away, and close allies, often selected on a sectarian basis, were brought in. While the Ba'ath thus propagated national identity and included different ethnic and religious groups in the government, the party was also involved in constructing a tense atmosphere where there was no room for disloyalty or opposition. Under the Ba'ath regime, instances of sectarian violence were quickly crushed.

== Sectarian violence under Saddam Hussein ==
In 1979, Saddam Hussein formally became the president of Iraq after Ahmed Hassan al-Bakr resigned due to health issues. Under Hussein's rule, the system in which citizens, organizations, and parties were monitored intensified in order to prevent losing political dominance over Iraq. Hussein assured full loyalty through extensive monitoring and by getting rid of any potential political opponent. Only six days after his formal installment, Hussein had 66 members of the Ba'ath party arrested and some of them killed, in what is known as the Khuld Purge, because he doubted their loyalties. This event set the stage for the next decades in which figures who were suspected of being disloyal to him could face years of imprisonment. Since many of those considered to be enemies or disloyal were of another sectarian background, sectarian tensions increased as well. For example, Kurdish, Shi'ite, and Iranian citizens were being deported out of Iraq with the motivation of being foreigners, which was often referred to as an act of sectarian cleansing at that time.

The sectarian tensions surfaced with the Iranian Revolution and the outbreak of the Iran-Iraq War in 1980. In 1979 the Iranian Revolution took place under the leadership of Shi'ite Grand Ayatollah Ruhollah Khomeini when he ousted the Pahlavi dynasty and paved the way for the establishment of the Islamic Republic of Iran. Khomeini started a propaganda campaign aimed at Shi'ites in Iraq encouraging them to follow the Khomeinist ideology and to revolt against the Sunni dominated regime of Hussein in order to eventually overthrow it. In 1980, Hussein declared war on Iran and tried to annex the oil-rich Iranian Khuzestan province. The reasons for going to war included Hussein's belief that Iran had broken the 1975 Algiers Agreement concerning the waterway and was interfering in Iraqi politics. Yet despite these political and economic motivations to go to war, the war was also fought on religious grounds. As Hussein later recalled, Khomeini had believed that the Shi'ite population in Southern Iraq would follow him, but they did not do so and remained loyal to Iraq, fighting the Iranians.

In order to prevent the Shi'ites from joining Iran, Hussein laid more emphasis on the Arabic character of Iraq as opposed to the Persian character of the Iranians. Furthermore, he tried to gain support from citizens with various ethnic backgrounds by making generous contributions to their communities. Examples include financial support to Shi'ite waqfs and the restoring of Imam Ali’s tomb. Despite these far-reaching efforts to gain support among different sects, sectarian tensions kept rising, mainly due to the Iran-Iraq War. Estimates suggest that around 250,000 Iraqis died during the war. These casualties on both Sunni and Shi'ite sides further enhanced rivalry among the different ethnic and religious groups. In addition, many Shi'ite soldiers, officers, and citizens fled the country and sought refuge elsewhere, primarily in Iran and Alawite-dominated Ba'athist Syria.

In the north, the displacement of Kurdish people as part of the Arabization campaign continued throughout the 1980s. Although the majority of people with a Kurdish background were not subjected to high casualty rates during the war, Hussein saw the activities from Kurdish political groups as a betrayal against his regime and accused them of cross-border military and intelligence cooperation with Iran. The Ba’ath regime punished these activist groups in northern Iraq by the use of extensive violence in the Al-Anfal Campaign at the end of the 1980s. This use of extreme violence caused a high number of casualties estimated to be around 150,000 to 200,000 deaths and echoed further into the Kurdish community, contributing to a stronger sentiment of sectarian division.

In the aftermath of the Iran-Iraq War, sectarian distrust exploded and became more visible during the First Gulf War, initiated by Hussein when Iraq invaded Kuwait in August 1990. Coalition forces responded by bombing Iraqi targets, mainly in the southern regions of Iraq. These counterattacks affected particularly Shi'ites, which endowed both casualties and damage to infrastructure. Following the retreat from Kuwait in 1991, uprisings erupted throughout 14 of the 18 provinces in Iraq. The rebels were mainly Shi'ite Arabs and Kurds who attacked the existing political power and their social exclusion under Ba’ath rule. The uprisings were predominantly sectarian in nature with the protesters showing pictures of Shi'ite religious leaders, such as Khomeini, and religious symbols. As researcher and journalist Khalil Osman describes the uprisings:

The rebellion in southern Iraq was marked by a vigorous assertion of Shi’ite identity, featuring overtly Shi’ite religious symbolism and rhetoric.… But the passionate and strident assertion of Shi’ite identity vis-à-vis the despotic Ba’athist state gave rise to fears and feelings of exclusion among Sunnis, which resulted in their loss of sympathy for the rebellion.

The uprisings were eventually suppressed by the use of brutal force and extensive violence by the regime such as mass executions of rebels. In the north, many Kurdish citizens felt forced to flee because of their fear for retaliation by the Hussein regime. Due to the bad living conditions in the mountains, over 20,000 of these refugees died during the subsequent months.

Although the restoration of Sunni state control and security proved to be a hurdle for the Ba’ath regime, they managed to restore order. In the next decade, Hussein would rely even more on allies of his own family and tribe and those that were loyal to him. Yet, despite Hussein's own renewed sectarian focus, other expressions of sectarian identity were harshly suppressed by the regime during the 1990s. Besides different assassinations on influential political and religious figures, widespread sectarian violence in Iraq only erupted again after the removal of Hussein from office in 2003 following the U.S.-led invasion.

== Sectarian violence following the U.S. invasion ==
Following the U.S.-led invasion of Iraq and the toppling of Saddam Hussein, the country slowly descended into a sectarian civil war. This rise in sectarian tensions was the result of a multiplicity of factors. First of all, the Coalition Provisional Authority (CPA), under leadership of Paul Bremer, started a campaign of de-Ba'athification and dissolved the Iraqi military and security. These two measures caused great unemployment, especially among the Sunni population of the country. Furthermore, the disbanding of the security forces led to high levels of criminality. In order to protect themselves, many Iraqi civilians joined or paid militias, mostly with a sectarian character.

At the same time, the Sunni Arab community, which had dominated the country under Saddam Hussein, was removed from power whereas the Shi'ite Arabs and Kurds rose to power. The new Iraqi Governing Council (ICG) came to be made up according to the country's demographics: 13 Shi'i, 5 Sunni Arabs, 5 Kurds, 1 Christian and 1 Turkman. Within this council, the Sunni community had many problems representing itself and setting its demands. Since many of the community's old leaders were mostly Ba'ath affiliates, they were either arrested or banned from participating in the ICG. In addition, there were no organized Sunni political parties since all political forms of Sunni representation besides the Ba'ath had been harshly suppressed under Hussein. In their rejection of the new political order, most Sunnis decided not to vote in the January 2005 parliamentary elections which resulted in their disenfranchisement in the newly formed government. Instead, the United Iraqi Alliance, made up of the two Shi'i parties Supreme Council for the Islamic Revolution in Iraq (SCIRI) and Da'wa, obtained a major victory.

Being dissatisfied with the Occupation of Iraq by the Multi-National Force, an insurgency arose from the summer of 2003 onwards. This insurgency was most intense in the Sunni provinces because the Sunni community felt marginalized by both the Coalition forces and the newly Shi'i-dominated government. Since many Sunnis viewed their demise from power as coherent with the Shi'i rise to power, this insurgency came to adopt a sectarian nature as well. Especially with the rise of Al-Qaeda in Iraq, attacks on Shi'i places and people became more common. Other prominent sectarian groups on the Sunni side were the Islamic Army in Iraq and the 1920 Revolution Brigades. Minorities such as Shia Turkmen, Feyli Kurds, and Shabaks were also targeted by Sunni Islamists.

Until the start of 2005 these sectarian attacks were hardly responded to by the Shi'ite population. Only the Badr Organisation was accused of perpetrating retaliatory attacks on former regime officials and prominent Ba'ath members. With the January 2005 elections, however, members of the Badr Corps infiltrated the security forces and started retaliatory actions against the Sunni population. It was at this moment that the Mahdi Army, under leadership of Muqtada al-Sadr, came to be involved in sectarian cleansing as well. These retaliatory attacks led to a cycle of violence which flooded the country in 2006 and 2007.

With the February 2006 al-Askari mosque bombing in Samarra, the violence escalated into a civil war which lasted from 2006 until the start of 2008. In this war, sectarian militias engaged in sectarian cleansing activities. Although exact numbers of casualties are uncertain, it is estimated that more than 20,000 civilians were killed in 2006 alone. By the start of 2008, tens of thousands of Iraqi civilians had been killed with about 4 million being displaced. Especially, the capital of Baghdad was hard hit as the city came to be rearranged on a sectarian basis. Former mixed neighbourhoods came to be ruled by sectarian militias who drove out everyone with another sectarian affiliation. Besides sectarian killings by death squads, the violence also included kidnappings for ransom payments and torture in secret detention centres ran by militias.

== See also ==
- Humanitarian crises of the Iraq War
- Sectarian discrimination
