= James Davey =

James Davey may refer to:

- James Davey (rugby union), British rugby union player
- James Davey (rugby league), English rugby league player
- James E. Davey, Northern Irish Presbyterian minister, historian and theologian
