= Lycian =

Lycian may refer to:

- Lycia, a geopolitical region in Anatolia (now Turkey)
- Lycian Apollo, a type of ancient Greek statuary
- Lycian Way, a hiking trail in southwestern Turkey
- Lycian Way Ultramarathon, an annual ultra-marathon in Lycian Way
- Lycians, people who lived in Lycia
- extinct languages formerly spoken in Lycia, i.e.
  - the Lycian language, also known as Lycian A and
  - the Milyan language, formerly known as Lycian B or, sometimes, Lycian 2
- the Lycian alphabet, used to write the Lycian language
- Lycian (Unicode block), the Unicode characters comprising the Lycian script

== See also ==
- Lucian (disambiguation)
- Lycia (disambiguation)
