= Sectarian discrimination =

Discrimination occurring with a group

Sectarianism can be defined as a practice that is created over a period of time through consistent social, cultural and political habits leading to the formation of group solidarity that is dependent upon practices of inclusion and exclusion. Sectarian discrimination focuses on the exclusion aspect of sectarianism and can be defined as 'hatred arising from attaching importance to perceived differences between subdivisions within a group', for example the different denominations of a religion or the factions of a political belief.

Sectarian discrimination is commonly an underlying factor in periods of sectarian violence. Sectarian violence can be characterised as a conflict either between or among groups with specific ethnicity or religion, where the reason for the violence is their differences. An example of sectarian violence is the conflict between Catholics and Protestants in Northern Ireland.

== Europe ==
Since the 17th century, there has been sectarian conflict of varying intensity in Ireland. This religious sectarianism is bound up with nationalism. This has been particularly intense in Northern Ireland since the 17th century. Due to Irish emigration these tensions can be found in other regions of the world, including Scotland (with some fans of football clubs such as Rangers and Celtic and Hearts and Hibs indulging in sectarian chants) (see: Sectarianism in Glasgow), Newfoundland, Canada's Maritime provinces, New York State, Ontario, Liverpool, Birmingham and elsewhere. See also Know-Nothings for anti-Catholic sentiment in the United States.

In Catholic countries, Protestants have historically been persecuted as heretics. For example, the substantial Protestant population of France (the Huguenots) was expelled from the kingdom in the 1680s following the revocation of the Edict of Nantes. Many Huguenots fled over the Channel to England in hope of a better life. In Spain, the Inquisition sought to root out not only Protestantism but also crypto-Jews and crypto-Muslims (moriscos); elsewhere the Papal Inquisition held similar goals.

In most places where Protestantism is the majority or 'official' religion, there have been examples of Catholics being persecuted. In countries where the Reformation was successful, this often lay in the perception that Catholics retained allegiance to a 'foreign' power (the Papacy), causing them to be regarded with suspicion. Sometimes this mistrust manifested itself in Catholics being subjected to restrictions and discrimination, which itself led to further conflict. For example, before Catholic Emancipation in 1829, Catholics were forbidden from voting, standing for election and buying land in Ireland.

Today, bigotry and discrimination in employment are usually relegated a few places where extreme forms of religion are the norm, or in areas with a long history of sectarian violence and tension, such as Northern Ireland (especially in terms of employment; however, this is dying out in this jurisdiction, because of strictly-enforced legislation. Reverse discrimination now takes place in terms of employment quotas which are now applied). In places where more 'moderate' forms of Protestantism (such as Anglicanism / Episcopalianism) prevail, the two traditions do not become polarised against each other, and usually co-exist peacefully. Especially in England, sectarianism is nowadays almost unheard of. However, in Western Scotland (where Calvinism and Presbyterianism are the norm) sectarian divisions can still sometimes arise between Catholics and Protestants. Indeed, in the early years following the Scottish Reformation there was actually internal sectarian tension between Church of Scotland Presbyterians and 'High Church' Anglicans, whom they regarded as having retained too many attitudes and practices from the Catholic era. Northern Ireland has introduced a Private Day of Reflection, since 2007, to mark the transition to a post-[sectarian] conflict society, an initiative of the cross-community Healing through Remembering organisation and research project.

The civil wars in the Balkans which followed the breakup of Yugoslavia have been tinged with sectarianism. Croats and Slovenes have traditionally been Catholic, Serbs and Macedonians Eastern Orthodox, and Bosniaks and the majority of Albanians Muslim. Religious affiliation served as a marker of group identity in this conflict, despite relatively low rates of religious practice and belief among these various ethnic groups after decades of Communism.

== Australia ==
Sectarianism in Australia is a historical legacy from the 18th, 19th and 20th centuries.

== Middle East and Asia ==
=== Iraq ===
The main sectarian conflict in Iraq is between Shia and Sunni Muslims, and it has led to large amounts of discrimination, bloodshed and instability. While the majority of Muslims in Iraq are Shia and the minority are Sunni, a number of scholars, including Hassan al’-Alawi, have consistently argued that sectarianism in Iraq privileges Sunni Arabs and discriminates against Shi’ites. The sectarian tensions between these two sects of Islam can be traced back to creation of the State of Iraq under British mandate, when the British appointed a Sunni oriented king, Faisal I. The first written evidence of sectarian discrimination is from 1935 when Shia lawyers wrote the Najaf Charter which documented their frustrations and discontent towards the sectarian discrimination against the Shia community in Iraq.

There are mixed views on how the Ba’ath regime effected sectarianism in Iraq. One perspective believes that the Ba’ath regime implemented policies that hardened lines between sectarian identities, contributing to worsened sectarian tensions. The second perspective believes that the Ba’ath regime tried to suppress sectarianism by implementing policies such as prison sentences for destroying, religious materials, places of worships or rituals.

More recently, the Sunni minority have been expressing feelings of increasing marginalisation by the Shia-led government led by Prime minister Nouri Maliki. The feelings of sectarian discrimination within the Sunni population has led to the creation of a narrative of communal victimhood.

=== Syria ===
The United Nations Human Rights Investigators, operating in Syria determined the Syrian civil war an overtly sectarian conflict. A deep sense of threat arising from sectarian discrimination against ethnic and religious minorities has caused such groups to align with parties involved in the conflict in hope they will provide protection, however this is contributing to deeper sectarian divides within the country.

The civil war has changed the sectarian distribution of Syria, due to large amounts of displacement and ethnic cleansing in specific areas. The country now can be seen as divided into four zones; aegis of the regime, the Rebels, or the Kurds.The zones under the control of the regime's army can be considered the most diverse zone, consisting of mainly Sunnis, a large number of Alawites and a small number of minorities who have fled into the area looking for protection. The rebel-controlled zones, are dominated by Sunni Arabs, and the minorities who lived in these areas have either been forced to convert to Sunnism or have fled. Lastly the Kurdish dominated zones, existing mainly along the northern border is controlled by the Kurdish-led Syrian Democratic Forces (SDF).

=== Lebanon ===
Lebanon's religious divisions are extremely complicated, and the country is made up by a multitude of religious groupings. Sectarianism in Lebanon was caused because of the sectarian incitement after Palestinian refugees and PLO entered the country. Jews in Lebanon faced discrimination after the Arab-Israeli War and during the civil war, although Lebanon was a Jewish friendly country and "far from an 'anti-Semitic [sic]' country" according to Kirsten Shulze. In the 1940s, after his appointment as interim president to supervise the parliamentary elections, President Ayoub Tabet tried to put in place a new election law that would allow Lebanese emigrants (with a Christian majority) to participate in the electoral process; this law caused a sectarian uproar (from Muslims) and a dispute occurred over the distribution of parliament seats. Dr. Ayoub Tabet was dismissed, and Christian emigrants were prevented from voting in the elections until 2018 by a law sought by the Minister of Foreign Affairs and Emigrants, Gebran Bassil. After the Taif agreement that ended the civil war, power was taken from the [Maronite] Christians' positions and was divided and/or given to Muslim positions; General Michel Aoun opposed the agreement and called it a conspiracy against the last country that preserves and respects the Christians of the Middle East and their historical role in it.

=== Pakistan ===
In Pakistan, there has been a history of sectarian violence and unrest since the 1970s, although much of the violence may be attributed to non-theological clashes over tribal lands, rivalries, and class-disputes. Almost all relations between Shias and Sunnis are peaceful, and there exists a large degree of intermarriage between the two communities. Further, many prominent Shias play an important political role in the country — the late Benazir Bhutto is believed to have been Shia, for example. However, sporadic violence between the two communities is often initiated by extremists on both sides, particularly in South Punjab.

== Sectarianism within Judaism ==
Sectarianism also exists between Orthodox and Reform Jews, with orthodox Jews often characterizing reform Jews as being non-religious, disobeying the Torah, rarely attending shul and adopting semi-Christian styles of worship. Reform Jews, on the other hand, often view the orthodox as being intolerant of them and of other religions, placing legalistic rules such as the observance of the Sabbath above ethical obligations, being cult-like and hostile to change.

== Religious sectarianism ==
Within Islam, there has been conflict at various periods between Sunnis and Shias; Shi'ites consider Sunnis to be Muslim but "non-Believers". Many Sunni religious leaders, including those inspired by Wahhabism and other ideologies have declared Shias (and sometimes mainstream Sunnis) to be heretics and/or apostates.

== Political sectarianism ==
In the political realm, to describe a group as 'sectarian' (or as practising 'sectarianism'), is to accuse them of prioritizing differences and rivalries with politically close groups. Separatist fundamentalist Protestant political parties have proliferated, and regularly denounce one another, in New Zealand, as can be seen from the entries on United Future New Zealand and Future New Zealand. Libertarianism seems to be similarly susceptible to fissiparous tendencies of its own.

== See also ==
- Authoritarianism
- Communalism (South Asia)
- Caste-related violence in India
- Ethnic cleansing
- Feud
- Fundamentalism
- Religious segregation
- Sports rivalry
- Sectarian violence
- Sect
- Cybersectarianism

== Memorials fostering a fragile parity-of-esteem-for-difference ==
- The Linen Memorial : Northern Ireland
