= Corrymeela Community =

Northern Irish charitable organisation

- Founded: 1965 by Ray Davey
- Type: Charitable organisation
- Location(s): 5 Drumaroan Rd, Ballycastle BT54 6QU and 83 University St, Belfast, BT7 1HP, Northern Ireland
- Services: runs programmes aimed at establishing a shared society defined by tolerance in schools, families, communities
- Fields: reconciliation, peace-building, building community
- Members: 161
- Key people: Alexander Wimberly
- Website: www.corrymeela.org

The Corrymeela Community was founded in 1965 by Ray Davey, along with John Morrow and Alex Watson, as an organisation seeking to aid individuals and communities which suffered through the violence and polarisation of the Northern Irish conflict.

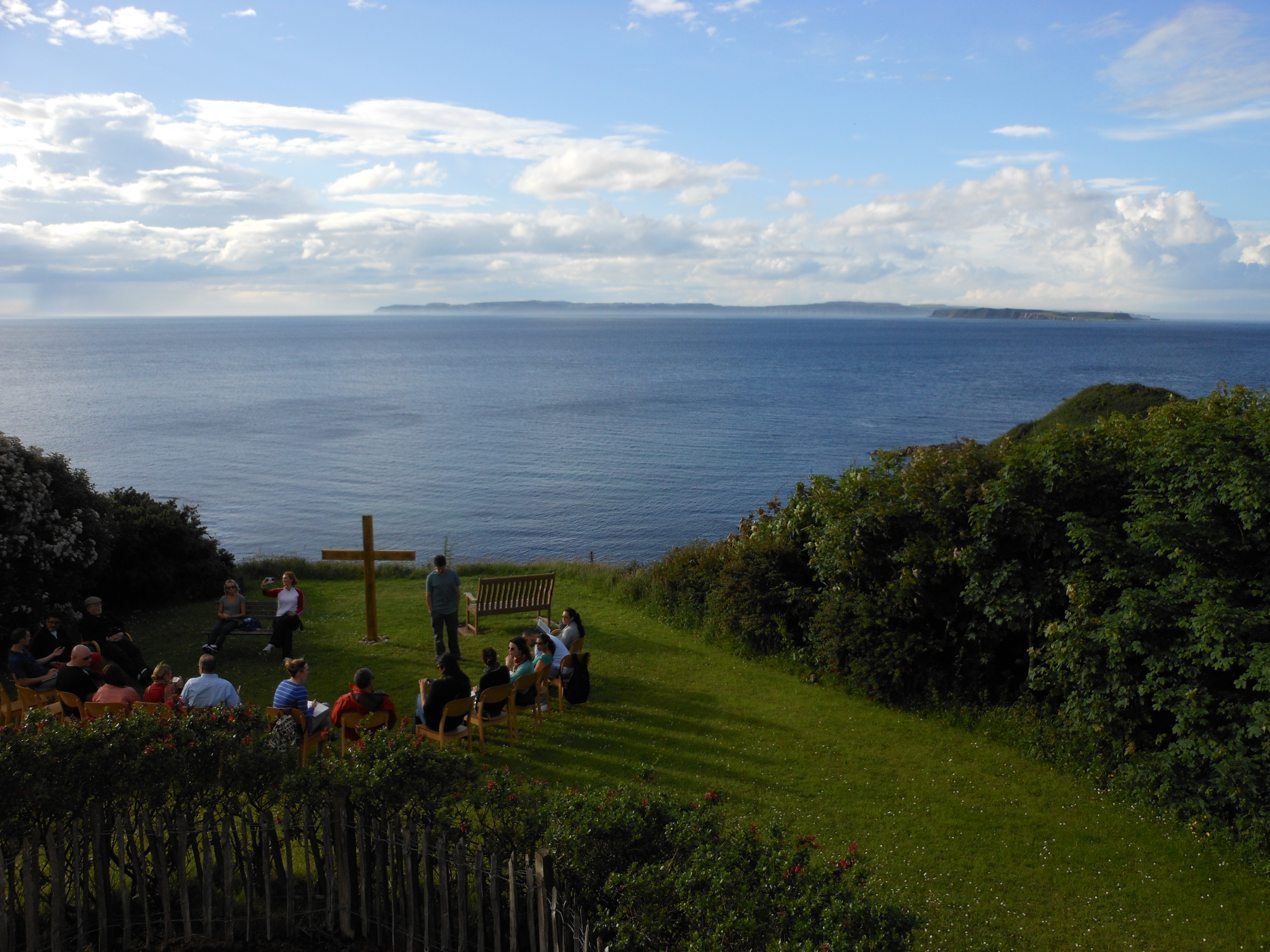
The Corrymeela Ballycastle Centre overlooks Rathlin Island.

Early members were Christians in Northern Ireland from diverse backgrounds who wanted to begin a new community which could counter apathy and complacency and open up new possibilities.

In early 1965, to give the community a physical gathering place, Corrymeela moved to the Holiday Fellowship Centre near Ballycastle in County Antrim. The new centre was formally opened that same year by Pastor Tullio Vinay, founder of the Agape Community, which was one of Ray Davey's greatest inspirations.

Its structure formalised, and a council was elected with Davey serving as treasurer and secretary. Corrymeela opened for the public in November 1965, opening itself as a place for Christian reconciliation in Northern Ireland.

Corrymeela was awarded the Niwano Peace Prize in 1997, in honour of "its contribution to significantly to interreligious cooperation, thereby furthering the cause of world peace."

== Programme work ==
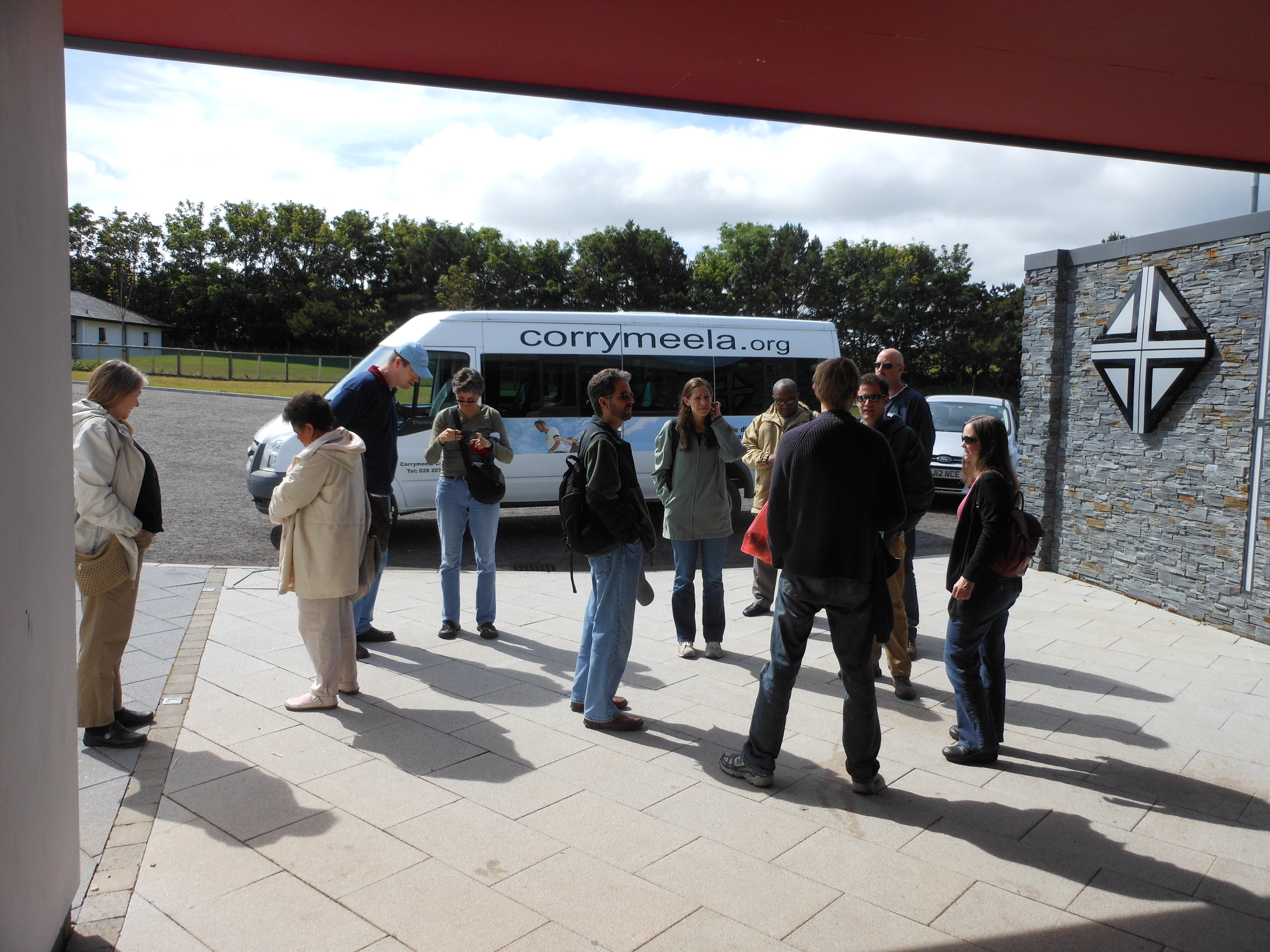
Each year over 6,000 participants take part in programmes at the Corrymeela Ballycastle Centre.

The community also exhibits artwork with themes of peace and reconciliation for Northern Ireland. In 2007, it exhibited The Linen Memorial, a piece made from almost 400 Irish linen handkerchiefs listing almost 4000 names of those killed in the Northern Irish conflict. Visitors left mementos and tokens beside names of those killed, making it an interactive and evolving artwork.

The community also hosts educational programmes at the Corrymeela Ballycastle Centre for groups of students and faculty members visiting from colleges and universities around the world.

== Leaders ==
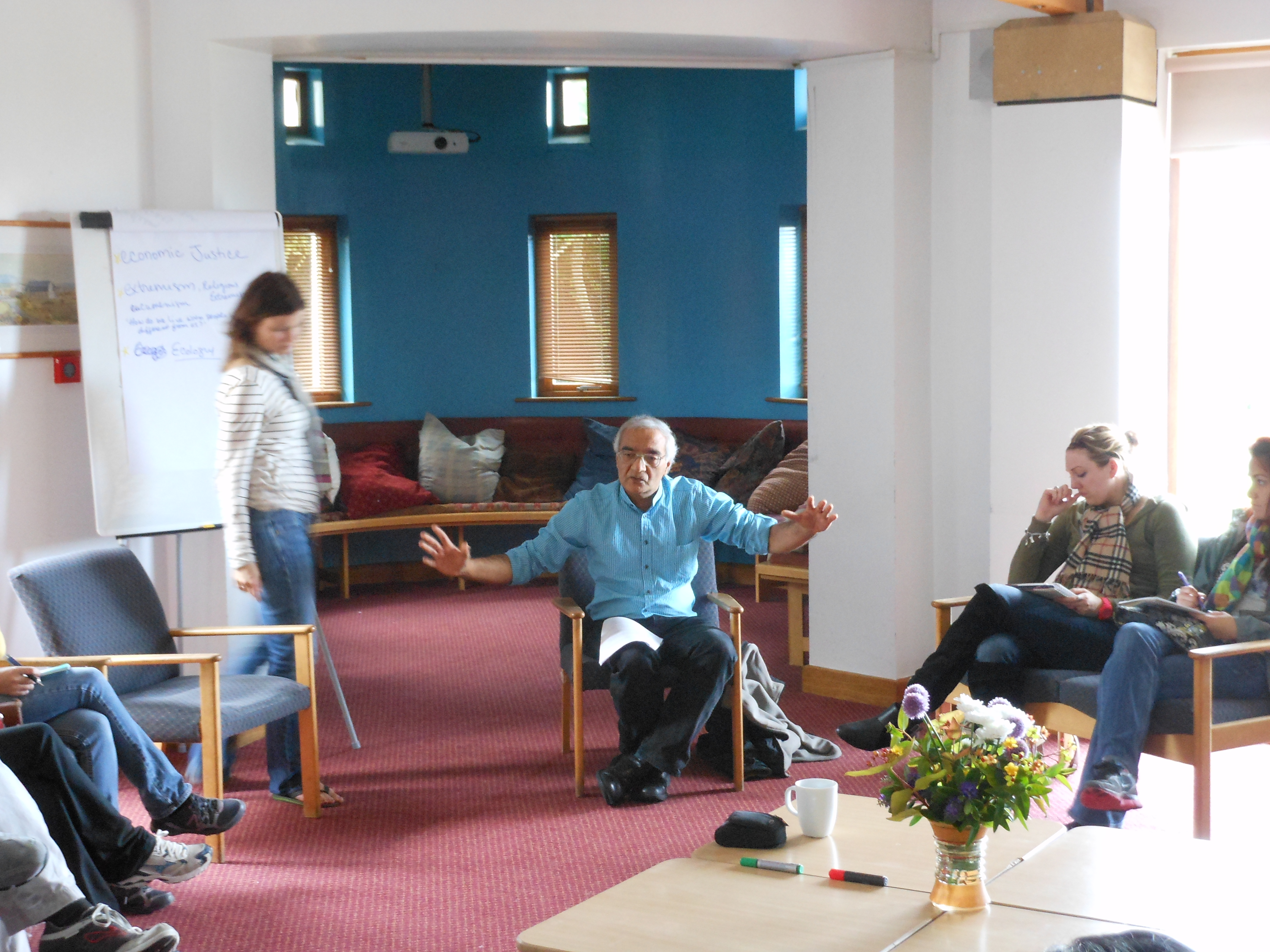
The Rev. Dr. Inderjit S. Bhogal, OBE, Leader of the Corrymeela Community, speaking at the Centre in 2012.

- Ray Davey 1965–1980
- John Morrow 1980–1994
- Trevor Williams 1994–2003
- David Stevens 2003–2010
- Kate Pettis 2010–2011
- Inderjit Bhogal 2011–2013
- Pádraig Ó Tuama 2014–2019
- Alexander Wimberly 2019–present

== Centre Directors ==
- Derick Wilson 1978 - 1985
- Colin Craig 1990 - 2001

== Volunteers ==
- Shaunagh Craig, Northern Ireland netball international

== See also ==
- Reconciliation theology in Northern Ireland
