= Isabel Deane Mitchell =

Irish missionary

- Born: 1879; Belfast, County Antrim
- Died: 23 March 1917 (aged 37–38); Silver Springs, Templepatrick, County Antrim

Isabel "Ida" Deane Mitchell (1879 – 23 March 1917) was an Irish Presbyterian medical missionary in China.

== Early life and family ==
Isabel Deane Mitchell was born in 1879 in Belfast. Her father was the Rev. Deane Knox Mitchell (1840–1939). Her mother was from Scotland, moving to Belfast when her father became a ruling elder in Elmwood Presbyterian church. She was the fourth child of five, with two sisters and two brothers. As Mitchell was entering university, it appears that talking to a wife of a missionary doctor in Manchuria, Mrs Sarah Greig, she decided to study medicine to also become a missionary. Others in her family worked in the church, her brother David became a minister, her sister Janie married the Rev. J. McWhirter and went with him in 1908 to China, and her other sister married a local Irish minister. Mitchell entered Queen Margaret University at age 18, studying there for six years and funded by donations from her father's parish. During her time there she received four medals and two prizes. From 1903 to 1905, she worked as a house-surgeon in Chorlton-on-Medlock dispensary in Manchester, as the Russo-Japanese War limited travel to China.

== Work in China ==
Mitchell set sail for China in the autumn of 1905 with Sara MacWilliams and Reverend F.W.S O’Neill, to take up a post as missionary for the Women's Association of Foreign Missions of the Presbyterian Church in Ireland. In November 1905 she reached the mission station in Fakumen, immediately taking up lessons in Mandarin. Her correspondence with her mother details events she witnessed including the opening of a new ladies' house at the mission station in 1907, and a new women's hospital on 16 October 1909 which was later described as "the first modern hospital". She returned to Ireland in October 1910, initially for one year, but an illness delayed her returning to China until 1912. She spent the following year in Chinchow, Manchuria engaged in lighter work until she was well enough to return to Fakumen. There she continued her medical work, as wall as training dispensary assistants, and teaching teachers' training class and Sunday school. She attempted, unsuccessfully, to establish a fund to train Chinese women in western medicine.

After conducting her clinic and teaching a class, Mitchell complained of feeling tired on Friday 16 March. By the next day she had a throat complaint, leading to her being seen by local and later missionary doctors, and ultimately being diagnosed with diphtheria. She rallied at first, but died suddenly on 23 March 1917. A service was held in tribute to her on 26 March 1917, and she was buried in the Russian cemetery in Kurin, near to where her sister was living as a missionary wife. A local Christian leader, Elder Shang, spoke at her funeral service stating that "Our doctor has given her life for us. For twelve years she has been at the call of any one who suffered. She was like a man in her strength, and rose at any hour of the night or day to help us. Her name is known and revered through all this country."

A selection of her writing to her mother was later published by her former colleague, Reverend F.W.S. O’Neill titled Dr Isabel Mitchell of Manchuria.
