= Samuel Barber (minister) =

Irish Presbyterian minister

Samuel Barber (1738?–1811), was an Irish Presbyterian minister. He is best known for the way in which he threw himself into the political and ecclesiastical struggles of his time. Charles Teeling considered him "one of the first and boldest advocates of the emancipation of his country and the union of all her sons."

== Early life ==
Barber was a native of County Antrim. He was the younger son of John Barber, a farmer near Killead. He entered Glasgow College in 1757, was licensed 1761 (on second trials 28 August at Larne) by Templepatrick presbytery, and ordained by Dromore presbytery, 3 May 1763, at Rathfriland, County Down, where he ministered until his death. He was a good Latinist, Tacitus being his favourite author; his Greek was thin; he was somewhat given to rabbinical studies, having collected a small store of learned books on this subject.

== Minister and colonel ==
When Lord Glerawley disarmed the Rathfriland regiment of volunteers in 1782, the officers and men chose Barber as their colonel in his stead. In this double capacity he preached (in regimentals) a sermon to the volunteers, in the Third Presbyterian Congregation, Belfast. He sat in the three volunteer conventions of 1782, 1783, and 1793, as a strong advocate of parliamentary reform, catholic emancipation, and a revision of the tithe system, the revenue laws, and the Irish pension list. Lord Kilwarlin, being asked to contribute to the rebuilding of his meeting-house, said he would rather pay to pull it down (broadsheet of August 1783). In 1786 Richard Woodward, Bishop of Cloyne, published his Present State of the Church of Ireland, to prove that none but Episcopalians could be loyal to the constitution. Barber's Remarks in reply showed him a master of satire, and embodied the most trenchant pleas for disestablishment that any dissenter had yet put forth ("Must seven-eighths of the nation for ever crouch to the eighth?"). Woodward made no response.

== Imprisonment and later career ==
In 1790 Barber was moderator of the general synod. He took a leading part in the County Down election of that year, which returned the Hon. Robert Stewart (afterwards Lord Castlereagh) in the Presbyterian interest, after a contest of thirteen weeks. In 1798 the authorities regarded him as a dangerous man. He was seized by a body of troops at his residence in the townland of Tullyquilly, and lodged in Downpatrick gaol on a charge of high treason. On 14 and 16 July he was tried by court-martial, but nothing was proved against him; he was never a United Irishman. However, he was detained in durance, and his third daughter, Margaret, a girl of sixteen, voluntarily shared his imprisonment. On his release, after a long confinement, he could obtain no redress. In religion, as in politics, he was a pronounced liberal, though no controversialist. His manuscript sermons are unmistakably Arian, and in the original draft of his Remarks he says, "Suppose now any legislator should so far forget common sense as to decree three one, and one three, &c." He was fond of quoting the Greek Testament in his sermons, and (marvellous to say) his draft of a petition to parliament from his presbytery contains two citations from Theodoret in the original. For an incident of his pastoral experience, turning on the difficulties of the then Irish marriage law, can be found in the autobiography of Catherine Cappe. Montgomery assigns to him "a singularly vigorous mind, a cultivated taste, a ready wit, a fluent elocution, a firm purpose, an unsullied character, and a most courteous demeanour."

Barber died 5 September 1811, in his seventy-fourth year.

== Family ==
In 1771 Barber married Elizabeth, eldest daughter of the Rev. Andrew Kennedy, of Mourne, and had seven children, but no son survived him. His daughter Margaret, (12 August 1782 – 21 May 1875), married John Galt Smith, of Belfast. George Kennedy Smith, his son, was left Barber's portrait and manuscripts.

== Publications ==
Barber wrote:

- Funeral Sermon for the Rev. George Richey (Job xxxiv. 15), Newry, 1772.
- Volunteer Sermon (2 Sam. xiii. 28), 1782 (a very spirited piece, under apprehension of foreign invasion).
- Remarks on a Pamphlet … by Richard, Lord Bishop of Cloyne, Dublin, 1787.
- Synodical Sermon at Lurgan (Rev. xviii. 20), 1791 (reckons the Nicene council as the beginning of the reign of Antichrist, and the French Revolution as the omen of its fall). Nos. 2 and 4 appear to have been published, but were also circulated in manuscript.
