= William Boyd (minister) =

Irish presbyterian

William Boyd (1685 - 1772), was an Irish Presbyterian minister.

== Life ==
Boyd studied at the university of Edinburgh and read divinity at Glasgow; he was ordained minister of Macosquin, County Londonderry, by the Coleraine presbytery on 31 January 1710.

In 1718, over 300 people from the River Bann area sent Boyd to Boston, to petition Samuel Shute, the governor of Province of Massachusetts Bay, with a proposal to allow an emigration from County Londonderry to that colony. In the same year (without awaiting the result of Boyd's negotiation), James McGregor (minister of Aghadowey, County Londonderry, from 1701 to 1718), who had not signed the document, emigrated to New Hampshire with some of his people and founded a town to which was given the name of Londonderry. Boyd stayed in Boston for several months and then returned to Macosquin.

In the non-subscription controversy, Boyd took a warm part. When the general synod of Ulster in 1721 permitted its members to subscribe to the Westminster Confession of Faith, Boyd was one of the signatories. He was on the committee of six appointed in 1724 to draw up articles against Thomas Nevin, M.A. (minister of Downpatrick from 1711 to 1744 and accused of impugning the deity of Christ), and probably drafted the document.

The following year, Boyd moved from Macosquin to a congregation nearer Londonderry (formerly known as Taughboyne and later as Monreagh), where he was installed by the Derry presbytery on 25 April 1725. His stipend was £50l. The congregation had been vacant since the removal of William Gray to Usher's Quay, Dublin, in 1721. In 1727, Gray (without ecclesiastical sanction) returned to Taughboyne and set up an opposition meeting in a disused corn-kiln at St. Johnston (within the boundary of his old parish). There arose defections, recriminations and the reduction of Boyd's stipend to £40l.

The general synod elected him moderator at Dungannon in 1730. The sermon with which he concluded his term of office the following year at Antrim demonstrates his orthodoxy as a subscriber to the Westminster Confession, and perhaps also proves that the influence of a non-subscribing publication (more than 10 years old) was still great. His sermon was directed especially against a discourse by the non-subscribing minister of the town in which it was delivered: Rev. John Abernethy, whose "Religious Obedience founded on Personal Persuasion" was preached at Belfast on 9 December 1719 and published in 1720. Boyd decided that "conscience is not the supreme lawgiver" and that it has no judicial authority, except insofar as it administers "the law of God": an expression which (to him) was synonymous with the interpretation of scripture accepted by his church.

In 1734, Boyd was an unsuccessful candidate for the clerkship of the general synod. His zeal for the faith was again shown in 1739, when he took the lead against Richard Aprichard, a probationer of the Armagh presbytery (who had scruples about some points of the Confession, and ultimately withdrew from the synod's jurisdiction). He was one of ten clergymen appointed by the synod at Magherafelt on 16 June 1747 to draw up a "serious warning" to be read from the pulpit against dangerous errors "creeping into our bounds". These "errors" referred to original sin, the "satisfaction of Christ", the Trinity and scriptural authority. The synod (despite its "serious warning") would not entertain a proposal to forbid the growing practice of inter-communion with nonsubscribers.

In 1754 Boyd was nominated to become the new minister at Carsphairn in Scotland; he was ordained on 24 February 1756 and was appointed Moderator of Presbytery at the end of that year.

Boyd died on 2 May 1772; he was buried at Taughboyne.

== Family ==
He was married with several children.

== Works ==
Boyd published only "A Good Conscience, a Necessary Qualification of a Gospel Minister: a Sermon on Hebrews 13:18 Preached at Antrim on 15 June 1731 at a General Synod of the Protestants of the Presbyterian Persuasion in the North of Ireland" in Derry in 1731.
