= Archibald Heron (rugby union) =

Rugby union player from Northern Ireland

- Full name: Archibald George Heron
- Born: 21 October 1875 County Down, Ireland
- Died: 1 January 1942 (aged 66) County Down, Northern Ireland

Rugby union career
- Position: Forward
International career
Years	Team	Apps	(Points)
1901	Ireland	1	(0)

Archibald George Heron (21 October 1875 — 1 January 1942) was an Irish international rugby union player.

Heron, the son of a reverend, was one of four siblings. His father was a professor at Assembly's College in Belfast. He attended the Royal Belfast Academical Institution, where he had four years with the first XV, earning Ulster Schools representative honours in 1893 and 1894, before taking up a scholarship to Queen's College Belfast. In 1901, Heron was capped for Ireland in a match against England at Lansdowne Road in 1901.

A medical doctor, Heron was a civil surgeon during the Second Boer War and was also served in World War I, with the Royal Army Medical Corps. He otherwise was based in County Down, working as a medical officer.

== See also ==
- List of Ireland national rugby union players
