= Clive Davey =

English cricketer

Personal information
- Full name: Clive Frederick Davey
- Born: 2 June 1932; North Petherton, Somerset, England
- Died: 3 August 2021 (aged 89); Taunton, Somerset, England
- Batting: Right-handed
- Bowling: Leg-break

Domestic team information
- Years: Team
- 1953–1955: Somerset

Career statistics
Competition	FC
Matches	13
Runs scored	261
Batting average	12.42
100s/50s	0/0
Top score	46
Catches/stumpings	4/–
- Source: CricketArchive, 22 December 2015

Clive Frederick Davey (2 June 1932 – 3 August 2021) was a cricketer who played in 13 first-class matches for Somerset split between the 1953 and 1955 cricket seasons.

Born at North Petherton, Davey was a right-handed batsman who in the mobile Somerset batting order of the early 1950s often batted at No 8 or even No 9. It was at No 9 that he made his debut in the match against Kent at Bath in June 1953. He played in seven further matches that summer, never making more than 30 runs, and never coming in higher than No 6.

Not appearing in 1954, he returned in 1955, and was more successful immediately. On his return to the team, again at Bath, this time against Leicestershire, he made 46, batting at No 5 in the first innings. But this was the highest score of his career: he failed to maintain this form and he turned down the option of a one-year extension to his contract at the end of the season. He did not bowl in first-class cricket.

Davey died on 3 August 2021, at the age of 89.
