= Richard Davey (disambiguation) =

Richard Davey (1938–2013) was an Australian actor, director and writer.

Richard Davey may also refer to:

- Richard Davey (MP) (1799–1884), British politician
- Richard Davey (writer) (1848–1911), English author and journalist
- Richard Davey (rugby union), English international rugby union player
- Richard A. Davey, American attorney and transportation executive
- Dick Davey, American college basketball coach
