= Ray Davey (footballer) =

New Zealand footballer

Personal information
- Full name: F Ray Davey
- Place of birth: New Zealand
- Position: Goalkeeper

Senior career*
Years	Team	Apps	(Gls)
- Technical Old Boys

International career
1947	New Zealand	4	(0)
- * Club domestic league appearances and goals

Ray Davey is a former association football goalkeeper who represented New Zealand at international level.

Davey made his full All Whites debut in a 5–6 loss to South Africa on 28 June 1947 and ended his international playing career with four A-international caps to his credit, his final cap an appearance in a 1–4 loss to South Africa on 17 July 1947.
