= John Morrow (peace activist) =

The Reverend John Morrow
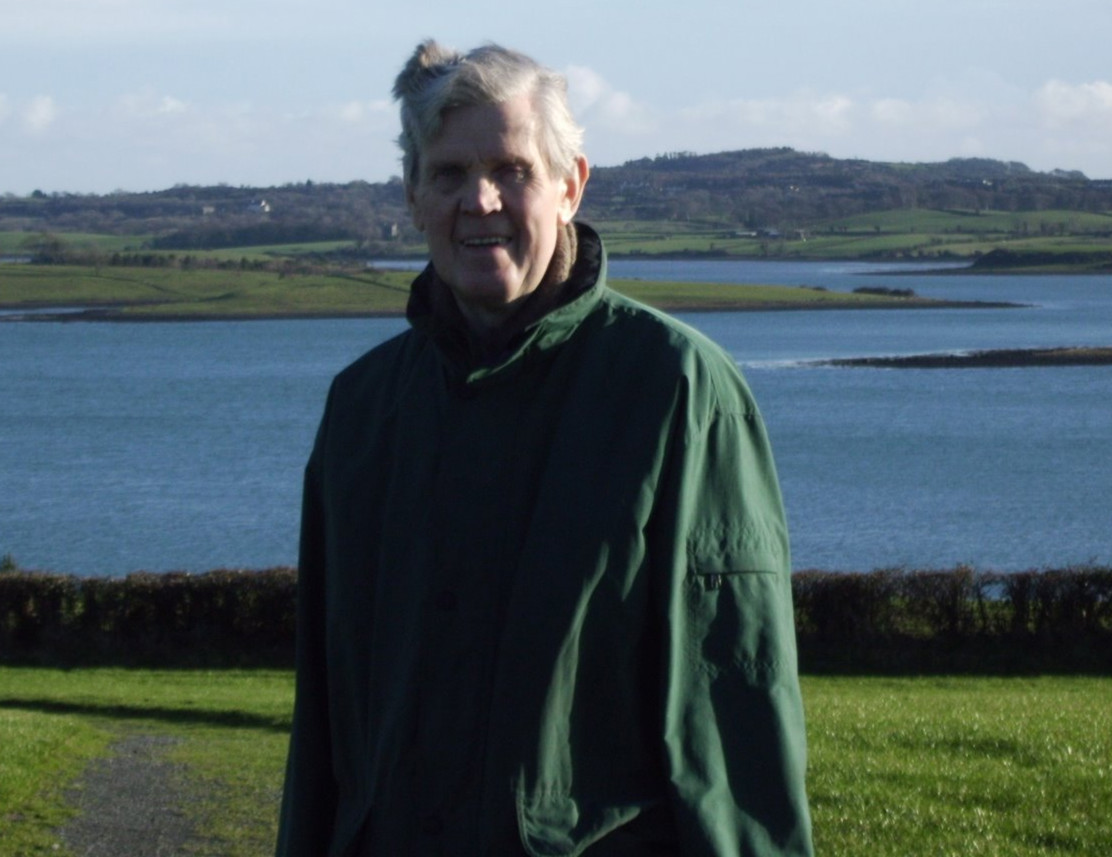
- Rev. Dr. John Morrow in front of Strangford Lough
- Born: 28 June 1931; Belfast, Northern Ireland
- Died: 1 January 2009 (aged 77); Belfast, Northern Ireland
- Education: Queen's University, New College, Edinburgh
- Occupation: Christian minister
- Employer: Corrymeela Community
- Known for: Peace activist during the Troubles, leader of the Corrymeela Community
- Title: Leader and Chief Executive
- Predecessor: Ray Davey
- Successor: Trevor Williams
- Spouse: Shirley Hume Edwards Morrow (1959-2004)
- Children: 4
- Relatives: Addie Morrow (brother)
- Website: corrymeela.org

John Morrow (28 June 1931 – 1 January 2009) was a Presbyterian minister and peace activist in Northern Ireland. He was integral in the 1965 founding of the Corrymeela Community, a Christian group committed to promoting peace and reconciliation in Northern Ireland. He succeeded Corrymeela's founder Ray Davey as the leader of the community in 1980 and served as its leader until 1993, providing it with a sense of cohesion and direction in its work of ecumenical Christian leadership and help for families during the Troubles.

== Education ==
Morrow grew up on a dairy farm near Dundonald, on the outskirts of Belfast. He was educated at Campbell College grammar school and then at Queen's University, where he took primary and master's degrees in agriculture. He then decided to become a minister and completed his theological training at New College Edinburgh and at the former Assembly's College, now Union Theological College.

== Early career ==
Morrow's first charge was at Seymour Hill Presbyterian Church near Lisburn, where he served as minister and pursued a career in the difficult and often controversial area of ecumenical relations.

From 1958 to 1971, he was a member of the Iona Community, which greatly shaped his philosophy and Christian witness.

== Leader of Corrymeela ==
In 1965, Morrow was a founding member of the Corrymeela Community, a Christian group committed to promoting peace and reconciliation in Northern Ireland. He served as the community's leader from 1980 to 1994, taking over the role from Corrymeela founder Ray Davey. He was involved with human rights issues, such as playing a role in the foundation of the Committee on the Administration of Justice, campaigning for the UDR Four, working as a member of the Faith and Politics Group, and helping with many other campaigns for justice on behalf of those affected by the Troubles. He also developed important links with church figures in the Netherlands, including the controversial Roel Kaptein, who shared with Corrymeela some of the stimulating philosophy of the noted critic and Bible commentator, René Girard.

During the darkest days of the Troubles, Morrow regularly arranged sanctuary for families being intimidated by paramilitary organisations on both sides of the political divide in Northern Ireland. As Corrymeela's leader, Morrow promoted dialogue with the main political parties and met regularly with parties connected to paramilitary organisations, including Provisional Sinn Féin and the Ulster Loyalist Democratic Party; the political wings of the Irish Republican Army and the Ulster Defence Association respectively.

== University chaplain ==
Morrow also served as university chaplain to overseas students in Glasgow from 1967. From 1971, he was a student chaplain in Dublin where he helped to establish the Glencree Centre for Peace and Reconciliation. In 1975, he became the Presbyterian chaplain at Queen's University, where Ray Davey had been a founding predecessor. Morrow quickly demonstrated his own breadth of vision as chaplain, as well as his sturdy independence and leadership qualities. He was described by his students as having inspired them to take the vision of better relationships and understanding into the wider world.

As Presbyterian Chaplain at Queens University, he encouraged the movement known as The Peace People, under the leadership of Betty Williams and Mairead Corrigan.

== Later work ==
After his time at Corrymeela, Morrow worked in association with the Irish School of Ecumenics as a lecturer and Northern Ireland co-ordinator. He published his memoir, entitled On the Road of Reconciliation: A Brief Memoir, in 2004.

Morrow received an honorary doctorate from the University of Ulster in 2006.

== Personal life ==
Morrow married Shirley Duncan on 29 December 1959; Shirley died on 8 July 2004. The couple had four children; Duncan, Philip, Alison, and Neil. He died in his sleep on 1 January 2009.

== Books ==
- The Captivity of the Irish Churches (1974)
- Confessions of Prionsias O’Toole (1977) [This book is actually by the novelist John Morrow (1930-2014) http://artscouncil-ni.org/news/obituary-john-morrow-belfast-novelist ]
- The Essex Factor (1982)
- Journey of Hope: Sources of the Corrymeela Vision (1995)
- Belfast: Faith in the City (contributor) (2001)
- On the Road of Reconciliation: A Brief Memoir (2004)
