= Edith Mary Davey =

British artist (1867-1953)

Edith Mary Davey (1867–1953) was a British artist known for painting miniatures and portraits.

== Biography ==
Davey was born at Chapel St Leonards in Lincolnshire, where her father was a farmer and landowner.

Davey studied at the Lincoln School of Art and then at the Royal College of Art, RCA, in London. At the RCA, Davey won, among other prizes, a silver medal and studied mural painting under Gerald Moira. Davey remained in London after her studies to paint murals, portraits and flower studies, working in oils, watercolours and chalk. She exhibited works at the Salon des Artistes Francais in Paris between 1928 and 1935 and also exhibited works at the Royal Academy, with the Women's International Art Club, the Society of Women Artists and the Royal Miniature Society. She also illustrated a number of books.

Davey was elected an Associate of the Royal College of Art in 1903 and also became an Associate member of the Royal Miniature Society. She died at Barnes in west London.
