= James Davey (rugby league) =

English rugby league footballer

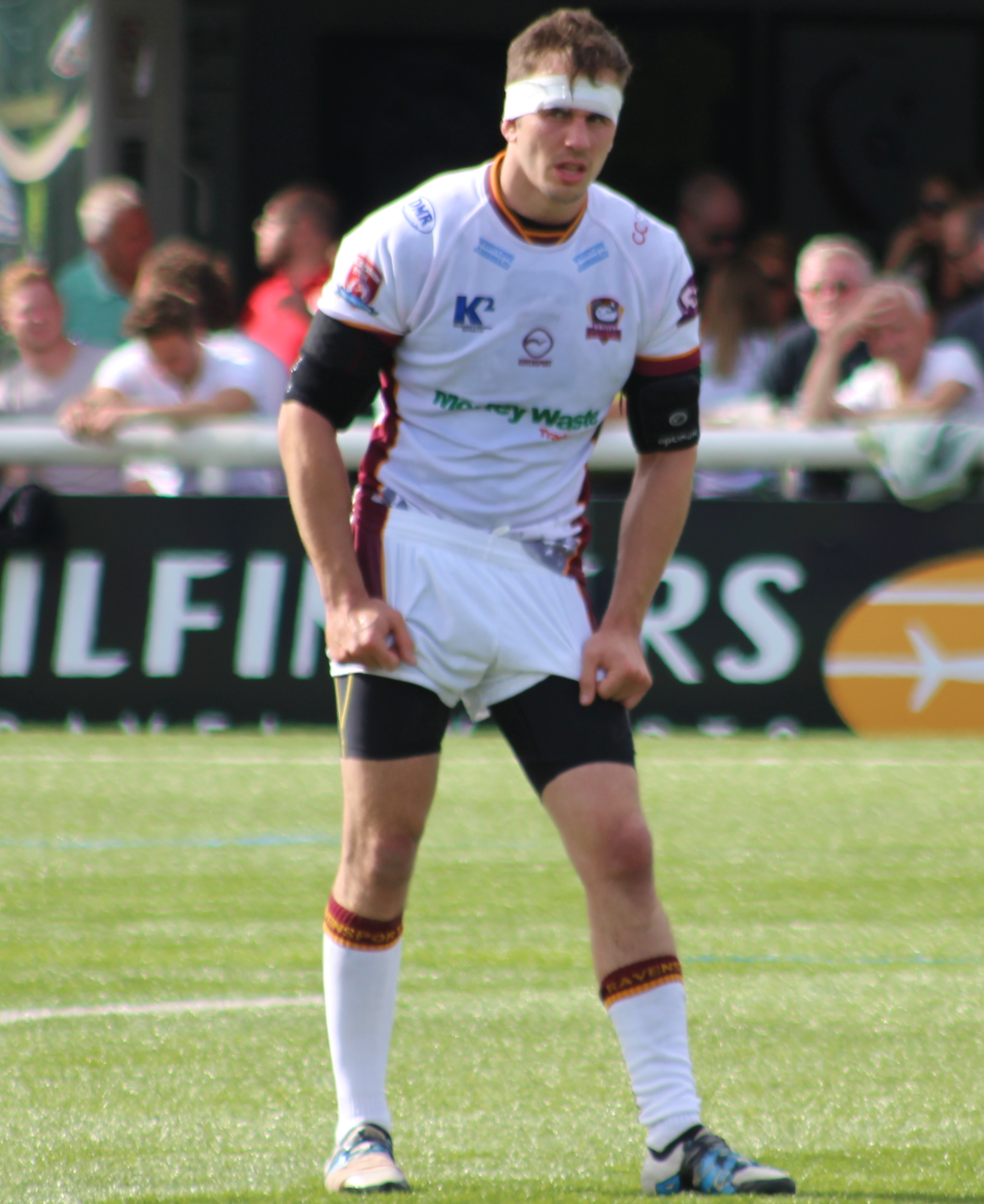

Personal information
- Full name: James Davey
- Born: 21 August 1989 (age 37) England

Playing information
- Height: 5 ft 9 in (1.76 m)
- Weight: 13 st 1 lb (83 kg)
- Position: Hooker
Club
Years	Team	Pld	T	G	FG	P
2009–12	Wakefield Trinity Wildcats	19	1	0	0	4
2011(loan)	→ Featherstone Rovers	0	0	0	0	0
2012(loan)	→ Keighley Cougars	5	0	0	0	0
2012–15	Sheffield Eagles	93	14	0	0	56
2016–18	Batley Bulldogs	67	6	0	0	24
2019–22	Sheffield Eagles	44	2	0	0	8
	Total	228	23	0	0	92

James Davey (born 21 August 1989) is a former English Rugby league footballer who last played as a hooker for the Sheffield Eagles in the Championship.

== Career ==
He made his first team début for Wakefield in 2009's Super League XIV, coming off the bench in a 31–18 loss away to Hull Kingston Rovers. In 2011, Davey scored his first professional try in 26–24 points win over Hull K.R. He played 19 times for Trinity and had loan spells with RFL Championship sides Featherstone Rovers and Keighley Cougars. Following his time at Wakefield, Davey moved on to then Championship title holders Sheffield Eagles. He made nearly 100 apps for the Eagles during his three years with the club and notched up 14 tries. After his release from Sheffield, James Davey joined fellow Championship side Batley Bulldogs. In his time at the club, two seasons, he played 55 games for Batley and scored 3 tries in that time. Off the back-end of the 2018 season, Sheffield Eagles re-signed Davey on a two-year deal, he was the Eagles' first summer signing ahead of 2019. He helped the Eagles to win the inaugural 1895 Cup as they defeated Widnes Vikings 36–18 in the final.
