= Ray Davey =

The Reverend Ray Davey
- Born: 10 January 1915; Belfast, Northern Ireland
- Died: 16 April 2012 (aged 97)
- Education: Royal Belfast Academical Institution, Queen's University Belfast, Union Theological College, and New College, Edinburgh
- Occupation: Christian minister
- Employer: Corrymeela Community
- Known for: Founder of the Corrymeela Community
- Title: Leader and Chief Executive
- Successor: John Morrow
- Relatives: Ernest Davey
- Website: corrymeela.org

Robert Raymond Davey (10 January 1915 – 16 April 2012) was a Presbyterian minister in Northern Ireland and the founder of the Corrymeela Community.

== Biography ==
He was educated at the Royal Belfast Academical Institution, Queen's University Belfast, Union Theological College, and New College, Edinburgh. He was married to Kathleen Davey (née Burrows), who died on 19 December 2008.

In 1940, he was ordained for field work with the YMCA War Service in North Africa, and helped to establish a centre in Tobruk for use by all faiths to care for the social, physical and spiritual needs of those engaged in desert warfare. He was taken captive in 1942 and held as a prisoner of war near Dresden, where he witnessed the allied bombing of the city, in which huge numbers of civilians died, and was imprisoned in France and Germany.

Returning home following the war, he was appointed (in 1946) the first Presbyterian Chaplain and Dean of Residences at Queen's University, Belfast.

As part of that work, he established a Community Centre (the first denominational community centre in the university); it was from those beginnings that the Corrymeela Community was eventually born in 1965 when a building on the north coast of Northern Ireland was purchased. The new centre was formally opened that same year by Pastor Tullio Vinay, founder of the Agape Community, which was one of Ray Davey's greatest inspirations.

At first, Ray Davey served as the elected Leader in a part-time capacity; he became full-time Leader of the Community in 1974 and continued in that position until his retirement in 1980, when John Morrow took over the role.

== Awards and honours ==
- Honorary Ph.D., Pontifical University, St Patrick’s College, Maynooth, 2002.
- People of the Year Award in 1978

== Books ==
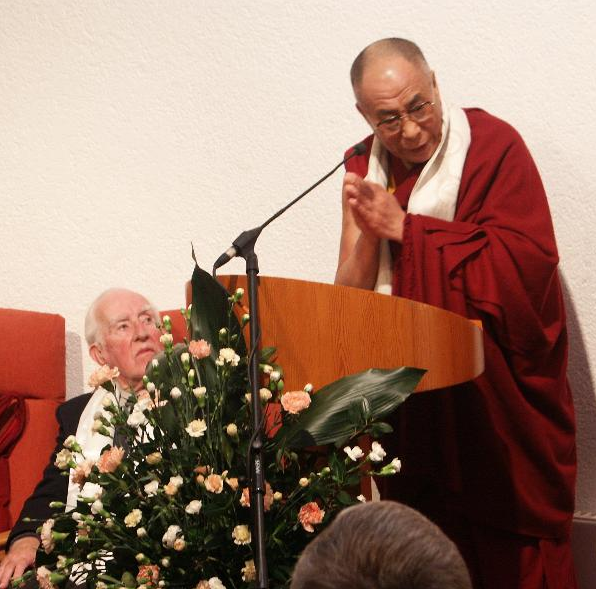
Ray Davey and the 14th Dalai Lama at the Corrymeela Ballycastle Centre

- The Pollen of Peace (Corrymeela Press, 1991).
- A Channel of Peace: Story of the Corrymeela Community (with John Cole, Zondervan, 1993).
- Six of the Best: Stories for My Grandchildren (Corrymeela Press, 2000).
- The War Diaries: From Prisoner-of-war to Peacemaker (Belfast: Brehon Press, 2005).
