= Lycia Trouton =

Canadian artist

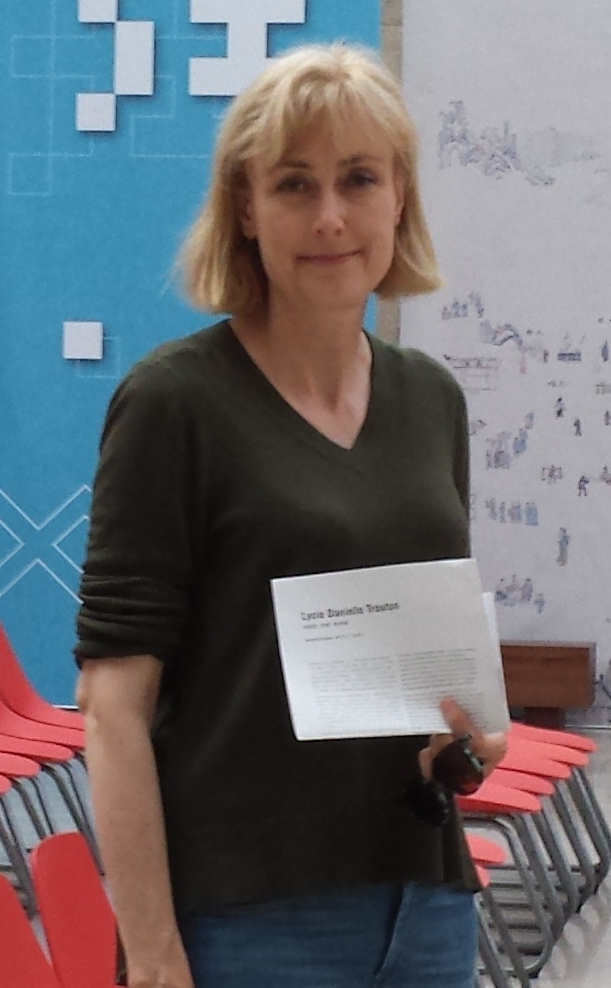
- Trouton in 2016
- Born: 1967 (age 58–59); Belfast, Northern Ireland, United Kingdom
- Other name: Lycia Danielle Trouton
- Education: Carnegie Mellon University, Cranbrook Academy of Art, University of Wollongong
- Occupation: Visual artist
- Notable work: "Linen Memorial"
- Movement: Land art

Lycia Danielle Trouton (born 1967) is a United Kingdom-born Canadian visual artist, teacher, and curator. She is known for her "Linen Memorial", a tribute to those that died in Northern Ireland during The Troubles. Trouton resides in British Columbia, Canada, and Belfast, Northern Ireland.

== Early life and education ==
Lycia Danielle Trouton was born in 1967, in Belfast, Northern Ireland, United Kingdom, and raised in Vancouver, Canada. Trouton went to a pre-college program at Emily Carr University of Art and Design and Otis College of Art and Design.

Trouton received a BFA degree in sculpture at Carnegie Mellon University in Pittsburgh, Pennsylvania, U.S.A. in 1988; a MFA degree from Cranbrook Academy of Art in Bloomfield Hills, Michigan, U.S.A. in 1991. She moved to Australia in 2001, and completed her doctorate in 2005 at the age of 38, at the University of Wollongong in Wollongong, New South Wales, Australia. Her thesis was titled, "An Intimate Monument: Re-Narrating 'the troubles' in Northern Ireland" (2004).

== Career ==
After beginning her career working in land art, she pivoted to work in public art with commissions in Seattle, Washington. Trouton has held visiting lectureships or done presentations at several higher education institutions, including Malmo Art School of Lund University, FLACSO Ecuador, University of Tasmania and Sheridan College, Toronto.

=== Linen Memorial ===
In 1999, after a visit to Northern Ireland, Trouton received a grant from Canada Council of the Arts to work on textile memorial to those killed in The Troubles of Northern Ireland called the "Linen Memorial". It is a list of almost 4,000 of those who died in 'The Troubles in Northern Ireland from 1966 to 2009 in a chronological names list, embroidered on Irish Linen handkerchiefs.

The Memorial was publicly unveiled in Northern Ireland at a peace and reconciliation centre on the first Private Day of Reflection, 2007, on the sectarian violence. It formed the basis of Trouton's graduate thesis. It was also shown in Canberra's Design Centre, CraftACT, Australia, 2004, and in 2011 in Portneuf, Quebec, Canada as a part of Quebec's International Biennale of Flax and Linen (BILP).

== Writings by or about the artist ==
- Heffer, Cecilia; Dorst, Kees; Shepherd, Rosemary; Williamson, Liz; Carnie, Bruce Wood; Trouton, Lycia (2007). Lace: Contemporary Textiles: Exhibition + New Works: Ceceila Heffer 2005–2007 (catalogue). University of Technology, Sydney, Ultimo, N.S.W. ISBN 9780977532551.
- FibreArts 2007, VOL 34; NUMB 3, pages 44–45
- The Linen Memorial: State and Sectarian Violence in Northern Ireland, in Pain and Death: Politics, Aesthetics, Legalities, a Journal of Research School of Humanities, ed. Carolyn Strange. Vol. XIV, No. 2, 2007. ANU Press and e-Press, Canberra, ACT, Australia.
- TIMEFRAMES 52 page color catalogue essays by Donald Kuspit, Beverly Leviner, Robert Metzger, Christopher Youngs works by Stan Douglas, Peter Fischli and David Weiss, Hamish Fulton, Rebecca Horn, Mark Klett, Eadweard Muybridge, Michael Snow, Hiroshi Sugimoto, Susan Crowder, Lycia Trouton February 14 – April 11, 1997 FG97-A1249-20
