= 1994 Birthday Honours =

British government recognitions

Queen's Birthday Honours are announced on or around the date of the Queen's Official Birthday. Publication dates vary from year to year. Most are published in supplements to the London Gazette and many are formally conferred by the monarch (or her representative) some time after the date of the announcement, particularly for those service people on active duty.

The 1994 Queen's Birthday honours lists were announced on 10 June 1994 for the United Kingdom, New Zealand, Grenada, Papua New Guinea, Solomon Islands, Tuvalu and Belize. The list for Australia was announced separately on 13 June.

Recipients of awards are shown below as they were styled before their new honours.

== United Kingdom ==
=== Life peer (Baron) ===
- Professor Sir David Chilton Phillips, K.B.E., F.R.S., Emeritus Professor of Molecular Biophysics in the University of Oxford.
- Professor Sir Charles Randolph Quirk, C.B.E., Professor of English and Fellow of University College, London.
- Sir Allen John George Sheppard, Chairman, Grand Metropolitan plc.

=== Privy Counsellor ===
- Michael Wolfgang Laurence Morris, M.P., Chairman of Ways and Means and Deputy Speaker of the House of Commons.
- Richard Francis Needham, M.P., Member of Parliament for Wiltshire North and Minister of State, Department of Trade and Industry.
- Sir Christopher James Prout, T.D., Q.C., Member of the European Parliament for Shropshire and Stafford.

=== Knight Bachelor ===
- Jeremy Hugh Beecham, Chairman, Association of Metropolitan Authorities. For services to local government.
- William Richard Benyon, D.L. For political service.
- Gordon Smith Grieve Beveridge, President and Vice-Chancellor, The Queen's University, Belfast. For services to higher education.
- Andrew Bowden, M.B.E., M.P., Member of Parliament for Brighton Kemptown. For political service.
- Professor Norman Leslie Browse, President, Royal College of Surgeons of England and Professor of Surgery, St Thomas's Hospital, London. For services to medicine.
- Joseph Stuart Burgess, C.B.E., Chairman, Anglia and Oxford Regional Health Authority. For services to health care.
- Kenneth Melville Carlisle, M.P., Member of Parliament for Lincoln. For political service.
- Robert Charlton, C.B.E. For services to sport, particularly association football.
- Paul Leslie Condon, Q.P.M., Commissioner, Metropolitan Police.
- Alan George Cox, C.B.E., Chief Executive, ASW Holdings plc. For services to industry in Wales.
- John Sagar Daniel, Vice Chancellor, Open University. For services to higher education.
- Jeremy Vernon Elwes, C.B.E. For political and public service.
- Robert Evans, C.B.E., lately Chairman and Chief Executive, British Gas plc. For services to the gas industry and to export.
- Ronald Garrick, C.B.E., Managing Director and Chief Executive, the Weir Group plc. For services to Industry and to public life in Scotland.
- John Michael Gorst, M.P., Member of Parliament for Hendon North. For political service.
- Martin Wyatt Holdgate, C.B., lately Director General, International Union for Conservation of Nature and Natural Resources. For services to conservation.
- Professor David Alan Hopwood, F.R.S., John Innes Professor of Genetics, University of East Anglia, Norwich and Head, Department of Genetics, John Innes Centre. For services to science.
- Ludovic Henry Coverley Kennedy. For political service and for services to broadcasting and writing.
- Edwin Alfred Grenville Manton. For charitable services to the Tate Gallery.
- Professor Laurence Woodward Martin, D.L., Director, Royal Institute of International Affairs.
- Charles David Naish, D.L., President, National Farmers' Union. For services to agriculture.
- Paul Henry Newall, T.D., Lord Mayor of London. For public and charitable services in London.
- Professor Roger Penrose, F.R.S., Rouse Ball Professor of Mathematics, University of Oxford. For services to science.
- Christopher Matthew Peterson, C.B.E., T.D., D.L. For political service.
- Brian Ivor Pitman, Director and Chief Executive, Lloyds Bank. For services to Banking.
- Simon Denis Rattle, C.B.E., Conductor and Music Director, City of Birmingham Symphony Orchestra. For services to Music.
- Timothy Miles Bindon Rice. For services to the Arts, particularly Music, and Sport.
- Neil McGowan Shaw, Executive Chairman, Tate and Lyle plc. For services to the Community and to the Food Industry.
- Professor Hans Wolfgang Singer, Emeritus Professor, University of Sussex. For services to Economic Issues.
- Professor William Duncan Paterson Stewart, Chief Scientific Adviser, Cabinet Office.
- Ray Stanley Tindle, C.B.E., D.L., Chairman, Tindle Newspapers. For services to the Newspaper Industry.
- Professor Leslie Arnold Turnberg, President, Royal College of Physicians and Professor of Medicine, University of Manchester. For services to Medicine.
- Professor David Philip Tweedie, Chairman, Accounting Standards Board. For services to the Accountancy Profession.

=== Order of the Bath ===
==== Knight Grand Cross of the Order of the Bath (GCB) ====
Military Division

- General Sir Charles Ronald Llewelyn Guthrie, K.C.B., L.V.O., O.B.E., A.D.C. Gen (461440), late Welsh Guards.
- Air Chief Marshal Sir John Thomson, K.C.B., C.B.E., A.F.C., Royal Air Force.

Civil Division

- Sir Clifford John Boulton, K.C.B., Clerk of the House of Commons.

==== Knight Commander of the Order of the Bath (KCB) ====
- Vice Admiral Peter Charles Abbott.
- Lieutenant General Robert Jeremy Ross, C.B., O.B.E.
- Major General John Paul Foley, C.B., O.B.E., M.C., late The Royal Green Jackets.
- Air Marshal Timothy Garden, C.B., Royal Air Force.
- Michael Addison John Wheeler-Booth, Clerk of the Parliaments, House of Lords.
- Nicholas Jeremy Monck, C.B., Permanent Secretary, Department of Employment.

==== Companion of the Order of the Bath (CB) ====
Military Division

Royal Navy

- Major General Andrew Myles Keeling, C.B.E.
- Rear Admiral Jeremy Thomas Sanders, O.B.E.

Army

- Major General Walter James Courage, M.B.E., late 5th Royal Inniskilling Dragoon Guards.
- Major General Robin Digby Grist, O.B.E., late The Gloucestershire Regiment.
- Major General Anthony Charles Peter Stone, late Royal Regiment of Artillery.
- Major General Michael Trenchard Tennant, late Royal Regiment of Artillery.

Royal Air Force

- Air Vice-Marshal Anthony John Crowther Bagnall, O.B.E., Royal Air Force.
- Air Vice-Marshal Peter Dodworth, O.B.E., A.F.C., Royal Air Force.

Civil Division

- Terence John Brack, Grade 3, Ministry of Defence.
- Patrick Carvill, Permanent Secretary, Department of Education for Northern Ireland.
- Charles Anthony Clark, Grade 3, Department of Education.
- John Edward William D'Ancona, Grade 3, Department of Trade and Industry.
- John William Scott Dempster, Grade 2, Department of Transport.
- Peter Sydney Draper, Grade 3, PSA Services.
- Michael Ernest George Fogden, Chief Executive, Employment Service, Department of Employment.
- John Frederick Halliday, Grade 2, Home Office.
- Michael Denis Huebner, Grade 2, Lord Chancellor's Department.
- Melvyn Gwynne Jeremiah, Grade 3, Department of Health.
- John Kenneth Ledlie, O.B.E., Grade 2, Ministry of Defence.
- John Wyn Owen, lately Grade 3, Welsh Office.
- Michael Alan Pickford, Grade 3, Government Actuary's Department.
- Quentin Thomas, Grade 2, Northern Ireland Office.
- Juliet Louise Wheldon, Legal Secretary to the Law Officers.
- David Anthony Wilkinson, Grade 3, Office of Public Service and Science.

=== Order of St Michael and St George ===
==== Knight Commander of the Order of St Michael and St George (KCMG) ====
- Leonard Vincent Appleyard, C.M.G., H.M. Ambassador, Peking.
- Alistair John Hunter, C.M.G., H.M. Consul-General and Director-General of Trade and Investment, New York.

==== Companion of the Order of St Michael and St George (CMG) ====
- John Kelvin Toulmin, Q.C., lately President, Council of Bars and Law Societies of Europe (C.C.B.E.). For services to the Legal Profession.
- Hugh Llewellyn Davies, Senior Representative, Sino-British Joint Liaison Group, Hong Kong.
- Simon William John Fuller, Head of UK Delegation to the Conference on Security and Co-operation in Europe, Vienna.
- Jeffrey Russell James, Chargé d'Affaires, H.M. Embassy, Tehran.
- Philip Alexander McLean, Minister, H.M. Embassy, Peking.
- Roland Hedley Smith, Minister, UK Delegation to the North Atlantic Treaty Organization, Brussels.
- Adrian Charles Thorpe, Minister, H.M. Embassy, Tokyo.
- Roger Clive Tutt, M.B.E., Foreign and Commonwealth Office.

=== Royal Victorian Order ===
==== Knight Grand Cross of the Royal Victorian Order (GCVO) ====
- The Right Honourable Matthew White, Viscount Ridley, K.G., T.D.

==== Knight Commander of the Royal Victorian Order (KCVO) ====
- Colonel Michael William McCorkell, O.B.E., T.D.
- The Right Honourable Savile William Francis Crossley, Baron Somerleyton.
- Doctor Conrad Marshall John Fisher Swan, C.V.O.
- Lieutenant Colonel Blair Aubyn Stewart-Wilson, C.V.O.

==== Commander of the Royal Victorian Order (CVO) ====
- Commander Richard John Aylard, Royal Navy.
- Marsom Henry Boyd-Carpenter.
- The Lady Margaret Colville.
- Terence Tenison Cuneo, O.B.E.
- Michael Charles Gerrard Peat.
- Frederick John Pervin.
- John Handby Thompson, C.B.

==== Lieutenant of the Royal Victorian Order (LVO) ====
- Philip David Charles Collins.
- Air Commodore Alan Charles Curry, O.B.E., Royal Air Force (Retired).
- John Trevor Dean.
- Suresh Dinkar Dhargalkar.
- Commander David Andrew Kenneth Freeman, Royal Navy.
- Peter Llewellyn Gwynn-Jones.

==== Member of the Royal Victorian Order (MVO) ====
- Stephen Charles Batchelor.
- Leslie Arthur Broome.
- Inspector John Leonard Frederick Brownridge, Metropolitan Police.
- Miss Heather Rosalind Colebrook.
- Captain The Honourable Edward Lionel Seymour Dawson-Damer.
- Inspector John William Harding, Metropolitan Police.
- Miss Belinda Jane Harley.
- Lieutenant Commander Robert Collie Henry, Royal Navy.
- Ronald Charles Aver Hooper.
- Anthony John Jarred, R.V.M.
- Lawrence Peter David Salter.
- Patricia Eileen, Mrs Simmonds.
- Miss Helen Andrea Louise Spiller.

==== Bar to the Royal Victorian Medal (Silver) (RVM) ====
- Leslie Donald Hillier, R.V.M.

==== Royal Victorian Medal (Silver) (RVM) ====
- David Leonard Biggs.
- Henry Charles Bynoth.
- Christopher Arthur Chiverton.
- Peter Robert Fielder.
- Elizabeth Muriel, Mrs Greenfield.
- Chief Technician Barry Neil Kelly, Royal Air Force.
- Elizabeth Pamela, Mrs Kirby.
- Peter Horace Matthews.
- Robert Raymond Melling.
- Police Constable Ian Miles, Metropolitan Police.
- Chief Petty Officer Marine Engineering Mechanic (Mechanical) Martin Peet.
- Albert Joseph Peterson. (Honorary)
- Robert John Richard Spokes.
- Gordon Thomas George Stephens.
- William Stanley Walker.
- Chief Technician Richard Henry Wicks, Royal Air Force.
- Divisional Sergeant Major Drummond Alfred Window, M.B.E.

=== Order of the Companions of Honour (CH) ===
- Sir Alec Guinness, C.B.E., Actor. For services to Drama.
- Professor Reginald Victor Jones, C.B., C.B.E. For services to Science.
- The Right Honourable David Anthony Llewellyn, Baron Owen, EU Co-Chairman of the International Conference on the former Yugoslavia.

=== Order of the British Empire ===
==== Dame Commander of the Order of the British Empire (DBE) ====
- Hazel Byford, O.B.E. For political and public service.
- Diana Rigg, C.B.E., Actress. For services to Drama.

==== Knight Commander of the Order of the British Empire (KBE) ====
- Keith Elliot Hedley Morris, C.M.G., H.M. Ambassador, Bogota.

==== Commander of the Order of the British Empire (CBE) ====
Military Division

Royal Navy

- Captain Bryan Burns, Royal Navy.
- Captain Ian Forbes, Royal Navy.
- Commodore Richard Montgomery Thorn, Royal Fleet Auxiliary.

Army

- Brigadier James Robert Drew (468987), late Corps of Royal Electrical and Mechanical Engineers.
- Colonel Robert Duncan Seaton Gordon (490208), late 17th/21st Lancers.
- Colonel Brendan Charles Lambe (492701), late Royal Regiment of Artillery.
- Brigadier Herbert Arthur Woolnough, O.B.E. (461526), late The Worcestershire and Sherwood Foresters Regiment (since retired).

Royal Air Force

- Air Commodore Robert David Arnott, Royal Air Force.
- Group Captain Michael Frederick John Tinley, A.E., A.D.C., Royal Auxiliary Air Force.
- Acting Air Commodore James Leslie Uprichard, Royal Air Force.

Civil Division

- Michael David Abrahams, M.B.E. For services to the community in Yorkshire.
- Keith Ackroyd, Managing Director, Retail Division, Boots Company and Chairman, British Retail Consortium. For services to the Retail Industry.
- The Right Reverend Michael Edgar Adie, lately Chairman, General Synod Board of Education. For services to Education.
- Michael Stanley Alderson, Chairman, Motorola Ltd. For services to the Electronics Industry.
- Philip John Attenborough, Deputy Chairman, Hodder Headline. For services to Publishing.
- Trevor Edward Bailey. For services to cricket.
- Professor Kenneth Barker, Chief Executive and Vice Chancellor, De Montfort University, Leicester. For services to Higher Education.
- Peter William Barker, lately Chairman, South East Thames Regional Health Authority. For services to Health Care.
- Allan Geoffrey Beard, C.B., Governor and Honorary Treasurer, Motability. For services to people with disabilities.
- Timothy Reuben Ladbroke Black, Chief Executive, Marie Stopes International. For services to Family Planning in Developing Countries.
- John Boorman, Film Director. For services to the Film Industry.
- George Cooper Borthwick, Managing Director, Etrucon Ltd. For services to Industry and to the community in Scotland.
- His Honour Henry Callow, lately Her Majesty's Second Deemster, Isle of Man.
- Herbert Anthony Cann, Chairman, East Lancashire Training and Enterprise Council Ltd. For services to Training.
- Iain Donald Cheyne, General Manager, Corporate Banking, Lloyds Bank. For services to the Administration of the Canary Wharf Development, London.
- John Colin Leslie Cox, Director General, Chemical Industries Association Ltd. For services to the Chemical Industry
- Professor Barry Cunliffe, Professor of European Archaeology, University of Oxford. For services to Archaeology.
- Peter Hampson Dawe, lately Grade 5, Department of Transport.
- Hugh Brendan Devlin, Consultant Surgeon, North Tees NHS Trust. For services to Medicine.
- Heather May Dick, Professor of Medical Microbiology, University of Dundee. For services to Medicine and to Food Safety.
- John Neville Diserens, lately Finance Director, Intervention Board.
- Professor Charles Thomas Elliott, F.R.S., Grade 4, Defence Research Agency, Ministry of Defence.
- George Esson, Q.P.M., lately Chief Constable, Dumfries and Galloway Constabulary.
- Douglas McKay Fairbairn. For political service.
- Professor Alexander Taylor Florence, Dean, the School of Pharmacy, University of London. For services to Pharmacy.
- Dennis Ernest Gilbert, Managing Director (Shipbuilding Division), Vickers Shipbuilding & Engineering For services to the Defence Industry.
- David Glencross, Chief Executive, Independent Television Commission. For services to Broadcasting.
- Charles Milne Glennie, Registrar General, General Register Office for Scotland.
- Charles Ireland Gray, lately President, Convention of Scottish Local Authorities. For services to Local Government in Scotland.
- Richard Joseph Haas. For charitable services, especially to Science and Technology.
- Ronald Joseph Harrison, Chief Executive, Student Loans Company. For services to Higher Education.
- John Edgar Harvey. For political and public service.
- David Edwin Hatch. For services to Radio Broadcasting.
- Roger Matthew Hay, Grade 5, Forestry Commission.
- Professor Robert Brian Heap, F.R.S., Director, Agricultural and Food Research Council's Babraham Institute. For services to Science.
- Max Hebditch, Director, Museum of London.
- James Henry, O.B.E. For services to the Construction Industry.
- Robin Arthur Elidyr Herbert, lately President and Chairman of the Council, Royal Horticultural Society. For services to Horticulture.
- John Hoddinott, Q.P.M., Chief Constable, Hampshire Constabulary.
- Thelma Holt, Director, Thelma Holt Ltd and Cultural Producer, Royal National Theatre. For services to the Theatre.
- Noel Denis Ing, Senior Legal Adviser, Monopolies and Mergers Commission.
- Anthony John Jackson, O.B.E., Chief Executive, Blue Circle Enterprises. For services to the Construction Industry.
- Eva Jiricna. For services to Interior Design.
- Christopher William Jonas, Senior Partner, Drivers Jonas. For services to the Chartered Surveying Profession.
- William Barry Keates, Director of Personnel, British Insulated Callender's Cables. For services to Industrial Relations.
- Barbara Mary Kelly, Grade 5, Overseas Development Administration.
- Stuart Oliver Knussen, Composer and Conductor. For services to Music.
- Dennis William Lait, lately Chairman, Graseby Dynamics Ltd. For services to the Defence Industry.
- Philip Gordon Langridge, Opera Singer. For services to Music.
- Richard Leslie Henry Lawrence, Grade 5, Her Majesty's Board of Customs and Excise.
- Richard Henry Lawson, Chairman, Investors' Compensation Scheme. For services to the finance industry.
- Peter Wilton Lee, Deputy Chairman, Carclo Engineering Group plc. For services to the steel industry.
- Professor Peter Lees, Member, Veterinary Products Committee. For services to the veterinary profession.
- John Patrick Leonard, Grade 5, Ordnance Survey, Department of the Environment.
- Anthony John Lewis, Accountant, House of Commons.
- Geoffrey Richard Lister, Director and Chief Executive, Bradford & Bingley. For services to the Building Society movement.
- Richard Arthur Lloyd Livsey. For political service.
- Brian Manley, Managing Partner, Manley Moon Associates. For services to Engineering and to training.
- John Ferguson McClelland, Director of Manufacturing and Product Development, IBM United Kingdom for services to Industry and Education in Scotland.
- Professor William Grigor McClelland, D.L. For charitable services in Tyne & Wear.
- Robert McGee, Chairman, British Vita plc. For services to the Polymer and Textiles industry.
- Professor Alasdair Duncan McIntyre. For services to Fisheries and Conservation of the Aquatic Environment.
- Jill McIvor, Q.S.M. For public services.
- David McMurtry, Chairman and Chief Executive, Renishaw plc. For services to Science and Technology.
- Professor Thomas Meade, Director, Medical Research Council's Epidemiology and Medical Care Unit and Honorary Consultant, St Bartholomew's Hospital, London and Northwick Park Hospital, Harrow. For services to Medicine and to Science.
- Professor John Gareth Morris, Professor of Microbiology, University College of Wales, Aberystwyth. For services to Science.
- Peter John Alexander Arthur Muir, Past Founding Chairman, Milton Keynes and North Buckinghamshire Training and Enterprise Council. For services to Training.
- Nigel Musselwhite, Q.F.S.M., Territorial Inspector of Fire Service.
- Donald Naismith, lately Director of Education, London Borough of Wandsworth. For services to Education.
- John Mitchell Neill, Group Chief Executive, Unipart. For services to the Motor Car Industry.
- Eric Newby, M.C., Travel Writer. For services to Literature.
- Jennie Page, Chief Executive, English Heritage. For services to Conservation.
- Ronald Talbot Parkinson, lately Chairman, Blackpool, Wyre and Fylde Health Authority. For services to Health Care.
- John Matthew Croose Parry. For political service (fundraiser).
- Matthew Le May Patient, lately Senior Technical Partner, Coopers & Lybrand. For services to the Accountancy Profession.
- John Denys Charles Anstice Prideaux, lately Chairman, Union Railways. For services to Rail Transport.
- Martin Charles Raff, Grade 4, Employment Service, Department of Employment.
- Cecil Herbert Rapport, M.B.E. For charitable services in Cardiff.
- Jessica Rawson Rawson. For services to the History of Art and Archaeology in China.
- Henry Rimmer, Leader, Liverpool City Council. For services to Local Government.
- Alexander Patrick Joseph Ross, Chairman, Joint Consultants Committee and Consultant Surgeon, Royal Hampshire County Hospital. For services to Medicine.
- Derek Thomas Jones Rutherford, Grade 5, Department of Social Security.
- Doug Scott. For services to Mountaineering.
- Madron Seligman, M.E.P., Member of the European Parliament for West Sussex. For political service.
- Duncan McCallum Sharp, Grade 4, Crown Prosecution Service.
- John Brian Shepherd, lately Grade 5, Her Majesty's Board of Inland Revenue.
- Pranlal Sheth. For services to Community Relations.
- Sidney Stewart Siddall, lately President, Association of the British Pharmaceutical Industry. For services to the Pharmaceutical Industry.
- Roger Castle-Smith, M.B.E., Grade 5, Foreign and Commonwealth Office
- Professor Thomas Christopher Smout, Deputy Chairman, Scottish Natural Heritage and Member, Royal Commission on the Ancient and Historical Monuments of Scotland. For services to Conservation.
- Professor Olive Stevenson, Member, Social Security Advisory Committee. For services to the Development of Social Services.
- Professor John Leslie Stollery, Head, College of Aeronautics, Cranfield University. For services to the Aviation Industry.
- John Harold Vick Sutcliffe, Chairman, North Housing Association. For services to Housing and Conservation.
- Professor Lindsay Symon, T.D., Professor of Neurological Surgery, Institute of Neurology and Honorary Consultant Neurosurgeon, National Hospital for Neurology and Neurosurgery. For services to Medicine.
- Iris Elsie Mary Tarry, Vice Chairman and Former Conservative Leader, Hertfordshire County Council. For services to Local Government.
- Joan Thirsk. For services to Agrarian and Local History.
- Bryan Sydney Townsend, Chairman, Midlands Electricity plc. For services to the Electricity Industry.
- John Anthony Wall, Chairman, Royal National Institute for the Blind. For services to Blind People.
- Clifford William Welch, lately Acting Chairman, the Design Council. For services to Industrial Design.
- Arthur Lewendon Wilson, lately Chief Executive, Stockport Metropolitan Borough Council. For services to Local Government.
- Cecil Douglas Woodward, O.B.E., lately Chief Commoner, Corporation of London. For services to the Corporation of London.

Diplomatic and Overseas List

- Edgar Robert Inglis Allan, O.B.E. For services to the International Exhibition Bureau, Paris.
- The Honourable Raymond Ch'ien Kuo-fung, J.P. For services to the community in Hong Kong.
- Elizabeth Mrs. Wong Chien Chi-lien, I.S.O., IP. Secretary for Health and Welfare, Hong Kong.
- Lieutenant Colonel Laurence Hollingworth, M.B.E. Lately UNHCR in the former Republic of Yugoslavia.
- Walther Gottlieb Louis Leisler Kiep. For services to British commercial interests in Germany.
- Miss Angela Brigid Lansbury (Mrs. Shaw). For services to the dramatic arts.
- Brian Buik Low, H.M. Ambassador, Tallinn.
- Michael Suen Ming-yeung, J.P., Secretary of Home Affairs, Hong Kong.
- The Honourable Rosanna Mrs. Wong Yick-ming, O.B.E., J.P. For services to the community in Hong Kong.
- The Honourable Clarence Vernon Woolridge, J.P, M.P., Minister of Tourism, Bermuda.

=== Officer of the Order of the British Empire (OBE) ===
Military Division

Royal Navy

- Commander Robin Patrick Parsons Burkitt, Royal Navy.
- Commander Alan Arthur Colmer, Royal Navy.
- Commander William David Frisken, Royal Navy.
- Local Lieutenant Colonel Michael Peter Hitchcock, Royal Marines.
- Major David Alan Hopley, Royal Marines.
- Major William Martin McDermott, Royal Marines.
- Commander Brian Purnell, M.B.E., Royal Navy.
- Commander Robert Reeder, Royal Navy.
- Commander Timothy John Kay Sloane, Royal Navy.
- Commander Dennis Richard Udy, Royal Navy.

Army

- Lieutenant Colonel (Acting Colonel) Clive Richard Elderton (495507), The Royal Logistic Corps.
- Colonel Glynne Rhys Baylis Jones, T.D. (491933), late Royal Army Medical Corps, Territorial Army.
- Lieutenant Colonel John Mark Kane (499731), The Royal Logistic Corps.
- Lieutenant Colonel Christopher Michael Edward Pugh (484007), Royal Tank Regiment.
- Lieutenant Colonel Colin Robinson, B.E.M. (499424), The Royal Logistic Corps (since retired).
- Lieutenant (Acting Lieutenant Colonel) Christopher James Rowland (471076), Army Cadet Force.
- Lieutenant Colonel Norman Geoffrey Smith (488100), Queen's Own Highlanders.
- Lieutenant Colonel (now Colonel) Andrew Richard Evelyn De Cardonnel Stewart (493787), The Light Dragoons.
- Lieutenant Colonel Simon Marcus Perrin Stewart, M.B.E. (483553), Queen's Dragoon Guards.
- Lieutenant Colonel Peter Anthony Wall (497536), Corps of Royal Engineers.
- Lieutenant Colonel Donald Allan Rance, The Bermuda Regiment.

Royal Air Force

- Wing Commander Terrence John Bacon (1936987), Royal Air Force.
- Wing Commander Andrew Bowen Wight-Boycott (0608611), Royal Air Force.
- Wing Commander John Alfred Cliffe (8025930), Royal Air Force.
- Wing Commander John Sutherland Douglas, M.B.E. (4232150), Royal Air Force.
- Wing Commander Gordon Harris (1948063), Royal Air Force,
- Wing Commander Anthony Peter Taylor Main (4232681), Royal Air Force (Retired).
- Wing Commander Alastair Campbell Montgomery, M.B.E. (2619737), Royal Air Force.
- Wing Commander William Kyle David Morrow (8025405), Royal Air Force.
- Wing Commander (now Acting Group Captain) Paul Anthony Robinson (0609492), Royal Air Force.
- Wing Commander Roderick Graham Thompson (4232434), Royal Air Force.
- Wing Commander Roger Utley (5201215), Royal Air Force.

Civil Division

- Jack Abernethy, Member, Radioactive Waste Management Advisory Committee. For services to Environmental Protection.
- John Allen, General Manager, Clarke Chapman Marine and Director, NEI Clarke Chapman Ltd. For services to the Defence Industry.
- Terence James Anderson, Grade 7, Department of the Environment.
- Eric Barker, lately Regional Pollution Control Manager, North West Region, National Rivers Authority.
- William Frederick Barton. For political and public service.
- Francis Streeter Bebbington, Vice President, Defence Marketing Pacific Rim, British Aerospace Defence Ltd. For services to the Defence Industry.
- Mary, Mrs. Bentall, Chairman, Board of Visitors, Wolds Remand Centre. For services to Prison Visiting.
- Vivian Norman Bingham. For political and public service.
- Bernard Thomas Binnington, lately President, Harbours and Airport Committee, Jersey. For services to the community on Jersey.
- Andrew Arthur Bishop, Second Master, Harrow School. For services to Science Education.
- Claude Blair. For services to Church Conservation.
- James Blair, Curator, Perth Museum and Art Gallery. For services to the Arts.
- Miss Joyce Blow (Mrs. Darlington), Member, Board of British Standards Institution. For services to Consumer Protection.
- Rabbi Lionel Blue, Writer and Broadcaster.
- Brian William Blunden, Managing Director, Pira International. For scientific services to the Paper, Printing and Publishing Industries.
- Harold Davies Blundred, Chairman and Managing Director, Transit Holdings Ltd. For services to the Bus Industry.
- Thomas Henry Boore, lately Chairman, National Caravan Council. For services to the Caravan Industry and to Tourism.
- Benjamin Edward Boot, Member, MAFF's North Mercia Regional Panel. For services to Agriculture.
- Michael Anthony Frederick Borrie, Manuscripts Librarian, the British Library.
- Antony James Boyce, Chairman, South Devon Healthcare NHS Trust. For services to Health Care.
- Philip Charles Bradbourn. For political and public service.
- Stephen Bradshaw, Executive Director, Spinal Injuries Association. For services to Disabled People.
- David Henry, Baron Brassey of Apethorpe, D.L. For services to the community in Northamptonshire.
- Richard James Briggs. For services to the Development of Hyde Park.
- Major William Garratt St. Stephen Brogan, D.L. For services to the Army Benevolent Fund in Leicestershire and Rutland.
- Christopher David Brook, Grade 7, Her Majesty's Board of Customs and Excise.
- Matthew Kennedy Browne, Medical Director, Monklands and Bellshill Hospitals NHS Trust and Consultant Surgeon, Monklands and District General Hospital, Glasgow. For services to Medicine.
- Colin Brummitt, lately Finance Officer, University of Warwick. For services to Higher Education.
- Peter William Brunt, Consultant Physician, Aberdeen Royal NHS Trust. For services to Medicine.
- Dilys Averil, Mrs. Burgess, Chairman, Policy Group, Independent Schools Joint Council. For services to Education.
- Peter Henry Frederick Burton, Group Chief Executive, Bloxwich Engineering Ltd. For services to the Engineering Industry.
- Frederick Bushe. For services to Sculpture.
- Peter Buxton, Governor 1, Her Majesty's Prison, Frankland.
- Gerald Cakebread, Grade 7, Hydrographic Office, Ministry of Defence.
- Miss Judith Chalmers, Broadcaster and Vice Chairman, Holiday Care Service. For services to Holidays for People with Disabilities.
- Alan Chapman, Official Receiver (B), Insolvency Service, Department of Trade and Industry.
- Philip Hemming Charters, Grade 7, Overseas Development Administration.
- Anne, Mrs. Cheetham, M.B.E. For political and public service.
- Andrew John George Chinn, Headmaster, Ferndale Comprehensive School, Mid-Glamorgan. For services to Education in Wales.
- John Edward Holder Christie. For services to Truro Cathedral and to the community in Cornwall.
- Hector Goodfellow Clark, Q.P.M., lately Deputy Chief Constable, Lothian and Borders Police.
- Elisabeth Kay, Mrs. Coleman, Chief Executive, Harveys and Company (Clothing) Ltd. For services to Equal Opportunities.
- Kenneth George Churchill-Coleman, Q.P.M., Commander, Metropolitan Police.
- Henry Anthony Coll. For services to Employment.
- Isabella Amelia, Mrs. Colvin, Member, Executive Committee, Women's National Commission. For services to Women's Issues and to the community.
- Elizabeth Margaret, Mrs. Conran, Curator, The Bowes Museum. For services to The Bowes Museum.
- Colonel Mark Thurston Cook (Rtd.). For humanitarian services in former Yugoslavia.
- Angela Beryl Sackville, Mrs. Cope, Vice President, Royal Society for the Prevention of Cruelty to Animals. For services to Animal Welfare.
- Robert Arthur Peter Coupe, Grade 7, Department of Health.
- Sebert Leslie Cox, Assistant Chief Probation Officer, Home Office.
- Colin Alexander Bell Crosby, Chairman, Grampian Housing Association. For services to the Housing Association Movement in Scotland. *David Lewis Crosby, Senior Consultant Surgeon, South Glamorgan. For services to the National Health Service in Wales.
- George Crowther. For political and public service.
- Ezekiel Adams Currie, Agricultural Inspector Grade 1, Department of Agriculture.
- Miss Jane Helen Darbyshire. For services to Architecture.
- Mary, Lady Davidson. For services to the community, particularly to Christian Aid, in Edinburgh.
- Anthony Murles Davis. For services to the community in Sheffield.
- Miss Caroline Harriet Dawes, Deputy Chairman, Occupational Pensions Board. For services to the Pensions Industry.
- Gillian, Mrs. Dawson, County Vice President, St. John Ambulance Brigade, Jersey.
- Captain James Charles Laurie De Coverly, Grade 6, Department of Transport.
- Charles Martin de Selincourt, Chairman, Foundation for the Study of Infant Deaths.
- Maureen Drew, Mrs. de Viell, Grade 7, Department of Employment.
- Peter Delany, Courts Administrator, Lord Chancellor's Department, Leeds.
- John Alexander Dempsey. For political and public service.
- John MacMillan Walter Dinwoodie, Grade 6, Department of the Environment.
- George Blyth Dorward, lately Member, Border Regional Council. For services to Local Government.
- Stephen Thomas Doughty, Grade 7, National Audit Office.
- Professor (John) Kerry Downes, Commissioner, Royal Commission on the Historical Monuments of England. For services to Architectural History.
- Philip Duffin, Grade 7, Her Majesty's Board of Customs and Excise.
- Gillian, Mrs. Duncan, lately Chairman, North Oxfordshire Area Advisory Panel on Justices of the Peace. For services to the Magistracy.
- Robin Gardner Easton, Rector, High School of Glasgow. For services to Education.
- Dorothy Joan, Mrs. Ekins, Chairman, Planning Services Committee, Fareham Borough Council. For services to Local Government.
- Ian Robert Emmerson, President, British Cycling Federation. For services to Cycling.
- Josephine, Mrs. Fairlie. For services to Industry and Commerce in Yorkshire.
- John McCallum Ferguson. For services to Waste Management.
- Jack Desmond Fisk, Member, Bristol City Council. For services to the Bristol Development Corporation.
- Lord Mark Fitzalan Howard, lately Member, Lord Chancellor's Honorary Investment Advisory Committee.
- James Anthony Fitzpatrick, lately Assistant Controller, Her Majesty's Board of Inland Revenue.
- James Wilson Flynn, Managing Director, Navico Ltd. For services to the Electronics Industry.
- Professor Max Fordham, Senior Partner, Max Fordham and Partners. For services to Engineering.
- David Oakley Arnold-Forster, T.D., Grade 7, Ministry of Defence.
- Valerie Edith, Lady France, Headmistress, the City of London School for Girls. For services to Education.
- Donald Frank Frost, lately Principal Valuer, Her Majesty's Board of Inland Revenue.
- David Richard Fryer, Secretary General, Royal Town Planning Institute. For services to Town Planning.
- Andrew Geddes, Controller, Her Majesty's Board of Inland Revenue.
- Peter Bryan Gildersleeves, Grade 6, Office of Public Service and Science.
- Miss Roma Gill, Lecturer and Writer. For services to English Literature.
- Catherine Joyce, Mrs. Glanvill. For services to the British Red Cross and to the community in Devon.
- William John Goldfinch, lately Director, Kent Training and Enterprise Council. For services to Training.
- Graeme Gordon, Chairman, Scottish Quality Trout. For services to the Fish Farming Industry.
- Martin Laing Gordon, Vice Chairman, S G Warburg and Co. Ltd. For services to Industry.
- David Roger Grayson, Managing Director, Business Strategy Group, Business in the Community. For services to Industry.
- Ralph Green. For services to the Meat Industry.
- Edward Harry Grenfield, Music Critic. For service to Music and to Journalism.
- Richard George Greenhow, Member, Dumfries and Galloway Regional Council and Member, Annandale and Eskdale District Council. For services to Local Government.
- Anthony William Parke Gribble, Chairman, Rent Assessment Panel for Wales.
- Philip John Hamilton-Grierson, Chairman, Management Committee, State Hospital, Carstairs. For public services in Scotland.
- Miss Pamela Helen Gruber, Assistant Secretary (International and Development Affairs), Board for Social Responsibility, General Synod of the Church of England.
- Christopher Clark Gustar, Managing Director, Westland Aerospace Holdings Ltd. For services to the Aerospace Industry.
- John Peter Brookes Hadfield, D.L., Chairman, South Manchester University Hospitals NHS Trust. For services to the community in Manchester.
- Mathew Joseph Hovey Hale, M.C., T.D., Chairman, T R Beckett Ltd. For services to the Newspaper Industry.
- David Robertson Hall. For services to the Food Industry.
- Professor Desmond Hammerton, Director, Clyde River Purification Board. For services to the Environment.
- Thomas Trevor George Hardy, Chief Executive, East Cambridgeshire District Council. For services to Local Government.
- Ralph David Hart. For services to the community, particularly the University of Essex, in Colchester.
- Betty, Mrs. Harvey, Chair of Governors, Lincolnshire College of Agriculture and Horticulture. For services to Education.
- Robert Francis Haselden, lately Grade 6, Department of Trade and Industry.
- Ruth Joyce, Mrs. Hawker, Director, Tor and South West College of Health Studies. For services to Health Care.
- Professor John Gregory Hawkes, President, Linnean Society. For services to botany.
- Vernon Walker Worsfold Hedderly. For services to Christian Charities through the Wallington Missionary Mart and Auctions.
- The Reverend Mary Elizabeth Hewitt. For services to the Welfare of Young People.
- Janet Cecilia Mary, Mrs. Hickman, lately Head, World Bank in London.
- Michael Wren-Hilton. For political and public service.
- William Edward Hindmarsh, Head of Operations, British Coal Corporation. For services to the Coal Industry.
- Deborah Mary, Mrs. Hinton. For services to the community in Westminster, London.
- Keith Hodge, lately Corporate Director, South Wales Region, Barclays Bank pic. For services to Banking.
- Joan Catherine, Mrs. Holton, Grade 7, Department of Health.
- Robin Harry Hood, Headteacher, Whitchurch High School, Cardiff and President, Welsh Secondary Schools' Association. For services to Education.
- John Walter Horn, Headteacher, Ossett School, Wakefield. For services to Education.
- Robin Clifford Horsfall, Grade 6, Ministry of Defence.
- Hugh Richard Owen Humphreys, Managing Director, Delcam International pic. For services to Export.
- Peter Ibbotson, Director of Construction and Engineering, J Sainsbury pic. For services to Energy Efficiency.
- Professor Norman Lindsay Innes, Deputy Director, Scottish Crop Research Institute. For services to Agricultural Science.
- Miss Marjorie Stephanie Irwin. For services to the Development of the Social Work Profession.
- Robert William Moore Irwin, Grade 6, Department of Health and Social Services.
- Gerald Michael Isaaman, lately Editor, Hampstead and Highgate Express. For services to Journalism.
- Peter Gordon Jarvis. For services to the community in Kingston upon Thames, Surrey.
- Graham Rhodes Johnson, Concert accompanist. For services to Music.
- Kenneth James Ross Johnston, General Manager, the Royal British Legion Industries.
- Samuel Johnston, lately Acting National Secretary, National Council of Young Men's Christian Associations.
- Michael Arthur Jones, Technical Director, GEC Marconi Dynamics Ltd. For service to the Defence Industry.
- William Ian Jones, Consultant Ear, Nose and Throat Surgeon, West Glamorgan Health Authority. For services to Medicine.
- Denis Walter Kellaway, Grade 6, Department for National Savings.
- Annette, Mrs. Kerr, Overseas Personnel Officer, British Red Cross Society.
- Shirley Patricia, Mrs. Knowles, Grade 7, Ministry of Defence.
- John Herbert Lace, lately Chief Executive, Babcock Energy Ltd. For services to Engineering and to Public Life in Renfrewshire.
- John Frederick Lambeth, Secretary, Liverpool Victoria Friendly Society. For services to the Friendly Society Movement.
- Miss Nancy Jane Lane, Senior Research Associate, Department of Zoology, University of Cambridge and Fellow Girton College. For services to Science.
- Royston David Layer, lately Grade 6, Ministry of Defence.
- Mark Le Fanu, General Secretary, Society of Authors.
- Peter Lederer, Managing Director, Gleneagles Hotels pic. For services to Tourism in Scotland.
- Neville Lees, Assistant Director of Public Health, Nottingham Health Authority. For services to Health Care.
- Arthur James Winterbotham Lewis, Vice Chairman, British Clothing Industries Association. For services to the Clothing and Textile Industries.
- Richard Owen Lewis, Vice Chairman, Economic Development Committee, Association of District Councils. For services to Local Government in Wales.
- Michael James Limb, lately General Secretary, Royal Automobile Club and Chairman, Speedway Control Board. For services to Motoring and Motor Sport.
- John Graham Lindsay, lately Senior Engineering Inspector, Department of Trade and Industry.
- Reginald John Little, lately Chairman, Dudley Advisory Committee on Justices of the Peace. For services to the Magistracy.
- John Longbottom. For political service.
- Keith Benjamin Madelin, County Surveyor, Shropshire County Council. For services to Road Transport.
- Howard Mann, President, British Food Export Council and Member, Food From Britain Council. For services to the Food Industry.
- David John Marlow, Chief Executive, Hammersmith and Queen Charlotte's Special Health Authority. For services to Health Care.
- Harley Hamilton Marshall, Deputy Chairman, East Kilbride Development Corporation. For public services in the West of Scotland.
- Terence Hedley Matthews, President and Chairman, Newbridge Networks Corporation. For services to the Communications Industry.
- Peter Robert McAinsh, lately Chairman, Engineering Construction Industry Training Board. For services to Training.
- William Henry McAndrew, lately Grade 6, Property Services Agency, Department of the Environment.
- Alexander McBean, Grade 6, Department of Social Security.
- Allen McClay. For services to the Pharmaceutical Industry.
- Professor Donaldson McCloy. For services to Education.
- Trevor Frank McCombie. For services to the Royal Society of Chemistry.
- Peter David McDonald, Chairman, Devon Committee for the Employment of People with Disabilities.
- Professor Bartholomew John McGettrick, Principal, St. Andrew's College of Education, Glasgow. For services to Education.
- Jean Camilla, Mrs. McGinty, Vice President, SKILL. For services to Students with Disabilities.
- Constance, Lady McIndoe, Chairman, sub-Committee B, Royal Air Force Benevolent Fund.
- Malcolm McMillan, Grade 7, Ministry of Defence.
- Kenneth McNeill, Q.F.S.M. For services to the Fire Service.
- Arthur David Melzer, Managing Director, Premier Oil Pacific Ltd. For services to the Oil Industry.
- Dorothy May, Mrs. Mercer, Director, Nursing and Patient Services, Royal Liverpool Hospital Trust. For services to Health Care.
- Peter Mannering Middleton, Director, W S Atkins Ltd. For services to Engineering and to the Channel Tunnel Project.
- Philip Mishon, Vice President, Royal Free Hospital Breast Cancer Appeal and for services to the Association of Jewish Ex-service Men and Women.
- John Mitchell, Her Majesty's Staff Inspector of Schools, Scottish Office.
- Martin Christopher Mitcheson. For services to the Prevention of Drug Misuse.
- Grant Morris, Grade 6, Procurement Executive, Ministry of Defence.
- Jon Kay-Mouat, lately President of the States of Alderney. For services to the community on Alderney.
- Rob Murdy, Assistant Managing Director, Marketing and Trading, Safeway. For services to the Food Retailing Industry.
- Michael George Nichol, Chairman, Executive Board, National Youth Agency. For services to Young People.
- Ralph Rodney Vincent Nicholson, T.D. For services to the Church of England and to the community in Newcastle upon Tyne.
- William Reed Nisbet, Representative Chairman, Sea Cadet Corps, Northern Region.
- John Martyn Nixon, lately Grade 6, Department of Social Security.
- Marie Vollam, Mrs. O'Brien, Chairman, South East Hampshire Advisory Committee on Justices of the Peace. For services to the Magistracy.
- Godfrey Harland Odds, Chairman, Berkshire Family Health Services Authority. For services to Health Care.
- Alan Oliver, Grade 6, Advisory, Conciliation and Arbitration Service, Department of Employment.
- Godfrey George Olson. For political and public service.
- Ronald Frederick Packham, Consultant, Binnie and Partners. For services to the Water Industry.
- John Niall Meredydd Parry, Seneschal, Priory for Wales, St. John Ambulance Brigade.
- Brother Francis Patterson, Head, St. Francis Xavier's College, Liverpool. For services to Education.
- Ann Judith, Mrs. Pearce. For political service.
- George Frederick Peterken, Woodland Ecology Consultant. For services to Forestry.
- David Anthony Phillips, Dental Director, Medical Protection Society. For services to the Dental Profession.
- Janet Mary, Mrs. Pugh. For services to the welfare of the Farming Community.
- Professor Colin Buchanan Radford. For services to the Arts.
- Anthony Damien Redmond. For medical services hi the former Yugoslavia.
- Geoffrey Llewellyn Richards, Deputy Head, Science and Materials Division, Engineering and Physical Sciences Research Council. For services to Science.
- Ivor Gifford Richards, Managing Director, Richards, Moorehead and Laing. For services to Civil Engineering.
- Isaac Vivian Alexander Richards. For services to cricket.
- David John Riddington, Chairman, Association of Drainage Authorities. For services to Agriculture and to the Environment.
- Paul James Ernest Rink, Chairman, Blackburn Groundwork Trust. For services to Environmental Regeneration.
- Professor William Ritchie, Senior Vice Principal, University of Aberdeen. For services to Higher Education.
- Tony Bessent Roberts, Chief Executive, Cynon Valley Borough Council. For services to Local Government in Wales.
- Reginald Robinson. For services to Journalism.
- (Henry) Richard Gwynne Robinson, Chairman, Major Spectator Sports Division, Central Council of Physical Recreation. For services to Sport.
- Rita Susan, Mrs. Roth, Director, Sait Communications. For services to the Shipping Industry.
- Peter Lomax Rothwell, District Inspector, Her Majesty's Board of Inland Revenue.
- John Roylance, Chief Executive and Consultant Radiologist, United Bristol Healthcare NHS Trust. For services to Medicine.
- Brian Scotney Russell, lately Principal Administrator, UK Steering Committee for Local Government Superannuation. For services to Local Government.
- John Derek Sanders, lately Organist and Master of Choristers, Gloucester Cathedral. For services to Music.
- Christopher John Saunders. For political service.
- Jill, Mrs. Saunders, Grade 7, Ministry of Defence.
- Garry Edward Schofield. For services to Rugby League Football.
- Garth Barrie Scotford, Q.F.S.M., lately Chief Fire Officer, Royal Berkshire Fire and Rescue Service.
- George Mackenzie Shearer, Governor 1, Her Majesty's Prison, Shotts.
- Michael Thomas Simmons, Chairman, Anglo Taiwan Trade Committee. For services to Export.
- John Vivian Simpson. For public services.
- Susan, Mrs. Slocombe. For services to Women's Hockey.
- Caroline Bridget, Mrs. Abel Smith. For political and public service.
- Leslie William Smith, lately Managing Director, Trainload Freight, British Railways Board. For services to the Rail Industry.
- Alison, Mrs. Smithies, lately Regional Consultant, in Primary Care, Wessex Regional Health Authority. For services to Medicine.
- Brigadier Thomas Stuart Sneyd, Deputy Secretary, Council of Territorial, Auxiliary and Volunteer Reserve Associations.
- John Thompson Spare. For political and public service.
- Margaret Anne, Mrs. Spurr, Headmistress, Bolton School Girls' Division. For services to Education.
- John Simon Stanley, Grade 7, Department of Employment.
- Alistair Donald Stewart, Chairman, Review Committee, Swansea Prison Parole Board.
- David Burnside Stewart. For services to the Dairy Industry.
- Joseph Martin Stewart. For services to the Police.
- Donald Andrew Stirling, Regional Reporter to Children's Panel, Lothian Region. For services to Young People.
- Richard Henry Butler-Stoney, Vice President, Norfolk Churches Trust. For services to Church Preservation.
- Peter Louis Style, Executive Director, British Overseas Trade Group for Israel. For services to Export.
- Laxmidas Narandas Swali, Grade 6, Department of Transport.
- Angela Mary, Mrs. Thomas, D.L., Honorary Vice President, British Red Cross Society, Cumbria.
- Professor Williamina Walker Thomson, Professor of International Health, Queen Margaret College, Edinburgh. For services to Health Care.
- Frederick Thornley. Chief Ambulance Officer for Oxford and Regional Ambulance Officer, Oxford Region. For services to Health Care.
- Robert Girling Tilmouth, lately Chief Executive, Tyne and Wear Chamber of Commerce. For services to Industry and Commerce through the Chamber of Commerce Movement.
- David Paul Bryan Tomblin. For services to the Film Industry.
- Kenneth John Tout, Voluntary Worker, Help Age International. For services to the Elderly.
- Colin Vivian Underwood, Consultant Director, Road Surface Dressing Association. For services to Road Construction and Engineering.
- Captain Edward Maurice Usherwood, D.S.C., Royal Navy (Rtd.), Vice President, Soldiers', Sailors' and Airmen's Families Association, Suffolk.
- Janice Mary, Mrs. Venables. For services to the Women's Royal Voluntary Service in Oxfordshire.
- John Walsh. For political and public service.
- Donald Henry Waters, Deputy Chairman and Chief Executive, Grampian Television. For services to Broadcasting.
- Anthony Gordon Watts, Director, National Institute for Careers Education and Counselling. For services to Education.
- Miss Anne Margaret Watts, Equal Opportunities Director, Midland Bank and Commissioner Equal Opportunities Commission. For services to Equal Opportunities.
- Donald Marshall Weston, Assistant Controller (Personnel), Her Majesty's Board of Inland Revenue.
- Brian George Whitehouse, lately Grade 5, Department of Education.
- Walter Richard Wignall, lately Managing Director, Matra Marconi Space (UK) Ltd. For services to the Space Industry.
- Rodney Gordon Wilkinson, First Secretary, Foreign and Commonwealth Office.
- David Trefor Williams, Senior Visiting Research Fellow in Health Education, University of Southampton. For services to Health Education.
- Richard Wilson, Actor and Director. For services to Drama.
- Mary Eileen, Mrs. Wimbury, Vice Chair, Executive Committee, National Association of Volunteer Bureaux.
- Peter Edric Wood, Chairman, West Yorkshire Commissioning Health Authority. For services to Health Care.
- Pamela, Lady Youde. For voluntary and charitable services, particularly to China.

=== Member of the Order of the British Empire (MBE) ===
- Ethel, Mrs. Acty. For services to the Royal British Legion and to the community in Gwynedd.
- Jennifer Audrey, Mrs. Adair. For services to MENCAP.
- David Hempleman-Adams. For services to Arctic Exploration.
- Harold David Adams, Chief Road Safety Officer, Manchester City Council. For services to Road Safety.
- Enid Sylvia, Mrs. Alanskas, Commercial Support Team Leader, Network South East, British Railways and for services to the community in Kent.
- Jessie Matilda, Mrs. Alexander, Chairperson, Hillcrest Housing Association Ltd. For voluntary services to the Elderly.
- Colin David Allen, Personnel Services Officer, British Steel. For services to the Personnel Profession.
- Richard Stephen Allen, Harbour Engineer, Harwich Haven Authority. For services to the Ports Industry.
- Hilary Sutherland, Mrs. Allinson, General Medical Practitioner in Oxfordshire. For medical services to the Homeless.
- Craig William Allison, Sector Officer, Humber Maritime Rescue Co-ordination Sub Centre, Her Majesty's Coastguard.
- Shaukat, Mrs. Amin. For services to the community in High Wycombe, Buckinghamshire.
- Dilys, Mrs. Anderson. For services to the community in Clwyd, North Wales.
- Pamela Lucy, Mrs. Anderson, Vice Chairman, South Somerset District Council. For services to Local Government.
- Eric Andrews. For services to Industry.
- Michael Charles Andrews, Senior Watch Officer, Brixham Maritime Rescue Co-ordination Sub Centre, Her Majesty's Coastguard.
- Robert Stewart Angus, Principal Officer, Scottish Prison Service.
- Mary Frances, Mrs. Appleton. For services to the community in St Helens, Merseyside.
- Shirley, Mrs. Arnold. For services to the community in Cardiff.
- Joseph Ernest Artus. For services to Road Safety in Gloucestershire.
- Raymond Douglas Ashman, Captain, Army Cadet Force, Kent. For services to Young People and to the community in Dover.
- Griffith Thomas Ellis Asquith. For services to the community in Howden, North Humberside.
- Sally, Mrs. Atherton. Area Organiser, King George's Fund for Sailors in North West England, North Wales and the Isle of Man.
- George Robert Baber, Tipstaff, Royal Courts of Justice, Lord Chancellor's Department.
- Denzil Howard Golden Bacon, Boatman, Nottingham University Boat Club.
- Dwarkanath Venkat Badami, Managing Director, Badami Associates. For services to Industry in North West England.
- Aly Bain, Folk Musician. For services to Music.
- George Ronald Baldock, lately Member, Electricity Consumers' Committee, Eastern Region. For services to Energy and the Electrical Supply Industry.
- John Lionel Ball, Member, Management Committee, Citizen's Advice Bureau, Forest of Dean.
- Dennis John Bambury, Higher Executive Officer, Her Majesty's Board of Customs and Excise.
- Mary Barbara, Mrs. Barber. For services to the community in Worth (near Deal), Kent.
- Frederick Rackett Barkby, lately Senior Probation Officer, British Forces, Germany.
- Arthur Louis Barker, Senior Watch Officer, Thames Maritime Rescue Co-ordination Sub Centre, Her Majesty's Coastguard.
- Helen Irene, Mrs. Barnard. For services to the community in Emsworth, Hampshire.
- Nancy, Mrs. Barnard, Member, Board of Visitors, Her Majesty's Prison Winchester.
- Haydn James Barratt. For humanitarian services in the former Yugoslavia.
- Miss Elsie Hannah Bartlett. For services to the community in Weston-super-Mare.
- John William Bartlett. For services to the community in Lincolnshire.
- Miss Yvonne Olwen Barton, Manager, Gas Sales and Negotiations, British Gas Exploration and Production Ltd. For services to Civil Engineering.
- Jeannine Patricia, Mrs. Bartosik, Co-founder and Trustee, the Zebra Trust. For services to Housing and General Welfare of Commonwealth and other post graduate students and their families.
- Winifred Jean, Mrs. Bavin. For services to the community in Lancashire.
- Kenneth Raymond Frank Beard. For services to the community in Wiltshire.
- Cyril Arthur Beer. For services to the Brass Band Movement.
- Miss Kathleen Anne Bell, Personnel Officer, British Nuclear Fuels pic. For services to the Nuclear Industry and to the community in Cumbria.
- Peter George Ernest Bell, Honorary Secretary, Concord. For services to Religious and Racial Harmony.
- Sylvia Margaret, Mrs. Bertram, lately Auxiliary Lieutenant, Royal Naval Auxiliary Service, S.P.N.X.O., North West Scotland.
- Robert Beswick, Vice Chairman, War Pensions Committee, North London.
- Henry (Harry) Bonnie. For services to the British Limbless Ex-Servicemen's Association in Manchester.
- Edith Mary, Mrs. Bird. For services to the Guild of Friends, Prince of Wales Hospital, Cardiff.
- Robert Victor Bishop. For services to the community in St. Budeaux, Plymouth.
- Phyllis Joy Rose, Mrs. Bissell, Chair, Save the Children Fund, Hornsey Branch.
- Thomas Black, Reserve Constable. For services to the Police.
- Roy Ivan Blackman. For services to the community in Manchester.
- Patricia, Mrs. Blackwell, lately Secretary, Community Council, Scott Bader Company Limited. For services to Industry and to the community.
- Jack Bloom, Treasurer, Self Help Enterprise, Bristol. For services to the community in Bristol.
- Lawrie Bloomfield, lately Manager, BBC Radio Shropshire. For services to Radio Broadcasting.
- Hilda May, Mrs. Bloor. For services to the Women's Institute in Lower Withington, Cheshire.
- George Blunt. For services to the community in Manchester.
- Archie Blyth, Head of Agricultural Services, Royal Bank of Scotland. For services to Banking and to Agriculture.
- Jean, Mrs. Blyth, Revenue Assistant, Her Majesty's Board of Inland Revenue.
- Stanley William Bone. For services to the Agamemnon Housing Association. For services to the Housing Association Movement.
- Charles Harry Arden Bott, D.L., lately Chairman, Hertfordshire Agricultural Society. For services to Agriculture.
- Janet Winifred Margaret, Mrs. Bottrell, Personal Assistant to the Channel Tunnel Complaints Commissioner.
- Marianne Elsie, Mrs. Bounsall. For services to the British Red Cross Society in Dorset.
- William Boyle, Senior Process Engineer, Vosper Thoraycroft (UK) Ltd. For services to the Defence Industry.
- Annie Mary, Mrs. Bracken. For services to the community.
- Francis James Bradley, Honorary Local Secretary, the Church of England Children's Society. For charitable services.
- Mary, Mrs. Bradley, Tutor and Counsellor, Inverclyde Council on Alcohol.
- Julia, Mrs. Brand, lately Administrative Assistant, Ministry of Defence.
- Frances May, Mrs. Bratby, Life Vice President, Derbyshire Federation of Young Farmers' Clubs. For services to Agriculture.
- Thomas Bravin. For charitable services to Young People in West Glamorgan.
- Gareth Bray, Executive Director, Enterprise Taff Ely Ogwr Partnership, Wales. For services to Commerce in Wales.
- Lilian, Mrs. Bray. For services to the community in Briton Ferry, West Glamorgan.
- Gary Brayne, Administrative Officer, Department of Employment.
- Anthony Brazier, Higher Executive Officer, Department of Employment.
- Lieutenant Colonel Hewitt Errington Brewis (Rtd), Chairman, Local War Pensions Committee, Isle of Man.
- Miss Patricia May Briggs, Inspector of Taxes, Her Majesty's Board of Inland Revenue.
- Albert Frederick Granville Brightwell. For services to the Royal National Lifeboat Institution, Tilehurst, Reading.
- Kenneth Frederick Bromfield, Training Officer, King's College, University of London. For services to Higher Education.
- Colin Victor Brown, Tour Guide, The Royal British Legion Poppy Factory Ltd. For services to the Royal British Legion.
- Doreen, Mrs. Brown. For services to the Grange Day Welfare Centre and to the community in Newcastle-upon-Tyne.
- Frances Mary, Mrs. Brown, Support Grade Band 1, Ministry of Defence.
- Miss Linda Brown, Clerk, Council of National Association of Citizen's Advice Bureaux.
- Miss Kay Brownlie. For services to the Guide Dogs for the Blind in Berwickshire.
- David Wolstenholme Budworth, Co-ordinator, Nanotechnology Link Programme. For scientific services to Industry.
- Alfred Reginald Burbanks, lately Senior Professional and Technology Officer, Ministry of Defence.
- Miss Joan Burns. For services to Music.
- Wendy Elizabeth, Mrs. Burt, Postroom Supervisor, British Aerospace Defence Ltd. For services to the Defence Industry.
- John James Burton, Deputy Principal, Lord Chancellor's Department.
- Louise, Mrs. Burton. For services to the community in Leicestershire.
- Reginald Louis Giddings Burton. For services to the community on the Isle of Wight.
- Arthur Butcher. For services to the community in Batley, West Yorkshire.
- John Dennis Griffin Butler, lately Superintendent Registrar for Tunbridge Wells. For services to the community.
- Howard William Cadwallader. For services to Tourism and to the community in Letchworth, Hertfordshire.
- Colin Anthony Caffrey, Vice Chairman, Family Health Services Authority and Chairman, Hospice for Bury Association. For services to Health Care.
- Thomas William Caley. For services to Anglian Water.
- Roger Stalworth Cambray. For services to the community in Blewbury, Oxfordshire.
- Miss Winifred Campbell. For services to the Department of Employment.
- Brian Carson. For humanitarian services in the former Yugoslavia.
- Lucy, Mrs. Carter. For services to Charing Cross and Fulham Hospitals League of Friends.
- David James Case, Honorary Secretary of the Wells Lifeboat Station, Royal National Lifeboat Institution.
- Hugh Brendan Casey. For services to the community.
- Leo Joseph Cassidy. For services to Conservation.
- James William Chambers, Laboratory Superintendent, Department of Psychology, University College, London. For services to Higher Education.
- Doreen, Mrs. Chaney, Chairman, Wandsworth Access for People with Disabilities. For services to Transport for People with Disabilities.
- Doreen Mary, Mrs. Chappell. For services to the Arts in Goole.
- Kenneth Chappell, General Secretary, Society of Ploughmen. For services to Agriculture.
- Joseph Samuel Chinn, Chairman, J. S. Chinn Holdings Ltd. For services to the Sheet Metal Industry.
- Captain George Robert Chisholm (Rtd), lately Retired Officer 2, Ministry of Defence.
- Maurice Edward Clapman, Charge Nurse, Learning Disabilities Service, Hull Health Authority. For services to Health Care.
- Alan Brian Clark, Chaffeur, Leicestershire County Council. For services to Local Government.
- Betty Joyce, Mrs. Clark, Higher Executive Officer, Department of Social Security.
- Maud, Mrs. Clark. For services to the Women's Royal Voluntary Service, Gateshead.
- John Cyril Clement, Central Services Manager, Social Services Department, Hertfordshire County Council. For services to Local Government.
- Miss Susan Merlyn Clifford, Joint Co-ordinator, Common Ground. For services to the Environment.
- Jeremy Rankin Clitherow. For services to the community in Liverpool.
- John William Clough, Chief Executive, Energy Action Grants Agency. For services to Energy Efficiency.
- Ranald Warren Monteith Clouston. For services to the Conservation of Church Bells.
- Keith Graham Clydesdale, Personal Secretary, Her Majesty's Board of Inland Revenue.
- John Edmund Coates. For services to the community in Pant, Merthyr Tydfll, Mid Glamorgan.
- Tongwyn Margaret, Mrs. Coates. For services to the community in Pant, Merthyr Tydfll, Mid Glamorgan.
- Michael Richard Coleman. For services to the community in Bristol.
- Beryl, Mrs. Collins. For political and public service.
- Pauline Beryl, Mrs. Collins. For services to the British Red Cross and to the community in Shepperton, Middlesex.
- Alec John William Collyer, School Crossing Patrol, Warwickshire County Council. For services to Education.
- John Connelly. For services to the community in Fife.
- John Patrick Conway. For humanitarian services in the former Yugoslavia.
- Thomas Edward Cook, Governor 4, Her Majesty's Prison Swansea.
- Barry Cooley, lately Principal Prison Officer, Prison Service College.
- Michael John Coombes, Workshop Supervisor, Avon and Somerset Constabulary. For services to the Police.
- Edith Mary, Mrs. Cope. For services to Blind People in Brentwood, Essex.
- Eileen, Mrs. Cordell, Support Manager 3, Department of Health.
- Miss Evelyn Broomfield Corry. For services to Young People.
- Barbara May, Mrs. Cottier. For services to the Department of Education, Isle of Man.
- Robert James Gordon Coulter. For services to Industry and to the community.
- David James Court, Convoy Leader. For humanitarian services in the former Yugoslavia.
- Alastair Harris Coventry. For services to prison visiting in Scotland.
- Colin Coyle. For humanitarian services in the former Yugoslavia.
- Brian Joseph Crangle, Chief Executive, Business Link Doncaster; lately Chief Executive, Doncaster Business Advice Centre. For services to Industry in Doncaster.
- Barrie John Critchley, Constable, Metropolitan Police.
- Nadene Pamela, Mrs. Crowther, Secretary and Appeals Co-ordinator to Hospice Care, Isle of Man.
- Susan Jenifer, Mrs. Cufflin. For political and public service.
- John Frederick Christopher Cullis, Headteacher, Barclay Junior School, Waltham Forest, London. For services to Education.
- Mary, Mrs. Curlett, School Caretaker. For services to Education.
- Richard Andrew Cuthbertson. For services to Industry in Wales.
- Khalil Rashed Dale, Nursing Delegate, British Red Cross Society. For services to Humanitarian Aid.
- Mary Winifred, Mrs. Davidson, Volunteer Observer, Meteorological Office, Derbyshire.
- Elizabeth Mary, Mrs. Davies, Headteacher, Anson Primary School, Brent, Middlesex. For services to Education.
- Joyce, Mrs. Davies, Clinical Assistant, Craig Dunain Hospital, Inverness. For services to Medicine.
- Marion Irene, Mrs. Davies. For services to the community in Swansea, West Glamorgan.
- Major Thomas Gwyn Davies, T.D., Deputy Clerk to the Justices, Bridgend. For services to the Legal System and to the local community.
- Doris May, Mrs. Davis. For services to the community in North Cornelly, Mid Glamorgan.
- John Davis. For services to the St. John Ambulance Brigade in Derbyshire.
- Brenda Margaret, Mrs. Day, Administrative Officer, Property Service Agency Services.
- Jeremy William Daykin, Group Leader (Audit), Her Majesty's Board of Inland Revenue.
- Rita Margaret, Mrs. Deacon, Typing Manager, Her Majesty's Board of Customs and Excise.
- James Dominic Delaney, Support Manager 3, Department of the Environment.
- Patrick Anthony Denison, M.C., Founder and Co-ordinator, CRASH. For services to the Single Homeless.
- Evelyn, Mrs. Dodson. For services to the community in Huntingdon, Cambridgeshire.
- Kenneth Dodsworth, lately Garage Manager, Rolls Royce Power Engineering Ltd, and for services to the National Society for Phenylketonuria.
- David Doig, Departmental Superintendent, Department of Anatomy and Physiology, University of Dundee. For services to the University of Dundee.
- Jacob Dominian, Director, One Plus One. For services to Marriage Counselling.
- Mavis, Mrs. Doughty. For services to the Lincolnshire Probation Volunteers.
- John Howard Doyle, President, the Romney Marsh Historic Churches Trust.
- James Herbert Drane, lately Sub-Divisional Officer, Suffolk Special Constabulary.
- James Christopher Driscoll, Chairman, the Storm Group pic. For services to Export and to the Publishing Industry.
- Alaster Drummond, Prototype Wireman, GEC-Marconi Avionics. For services to the Defence Industry.
- Agnes Teresa, Mrs. Dufton, Organiser, Women's Royal Voluntary Service and Prison Visitor, Her Majesty's Prison Grendon.
- Patrick John Duncan. For services to the Braemar Mountain Rescue Team.
- Cyril Charles Durrant. For services to the community in Norfolk.
- Jean Milne, Mrs. Dykes, School Secretary, Ardler Primary School, Dundee. For services to Education.
- Robert Lindsay Dykes, Agricultural Engineer, R. L. Dykes. For services to Agriculture.
- Derek Charles Eaglestone. For services to the St. John Ambulance Brigade and to Sport.
- David Jamil El Kabir, General Medical Practitioner in Maida Vale, London. For medical services to the Homeless.
- Patricia, Mrs. Elliott, Registered Health Visitor, Warrington. For services to Health Care.
- Samuel George Ellis, Member, Isles of Scilly Council. For services to Local Government.
- Terry Richard Emery, Supervisor, Thames Water. For services to Health and Safety in the Water Industry.
- Anthony Kevin Evans, Constable, Dyfed-Powys Police and for services to young people in Dyfed.
- Gaynor, Mrs. Evans, Higher Executive Officer, Driver and Vehicle Licensing Agency, Department of Transport.
- John Frederick Evans. For services to the community in Gloucestershire.
- Richard Glyn Evans. For political service.
- Gillian Pamela, Mrs. Eves. For services to Prison Visiting.
- Miss Nicola Kim Fairbrother. For services to Judo.
- Thomas Anthony Fairclough, Local Officer 2, Department of Social Security.
- Leslie Ernest Fairey. For services to the community in Buckinghamshire.
- Miss Venetia Sophia Diana Fane, Administrative Secretary, Scottish Committee, Malcolm Sargent Cancer Fund for Children.
- Arnold Faulkner, Production Leader (Engineering), Midlands Electricity pic and for services to the community in Staffordshire.
- Patricia Carol, Mrs. Fearnley. For political service.
- Roland Feather. For services to the community in Calderdale.
- Miss Doris May Felton. For voluntary services to the National Grocers' Benevolent Fund.
- Thomas Ferris, Principal Officer, Her Majesty's Prison Low Moss.
- Geoffrey Alan Figgett, Head Porter, Kent County Council. For services to Local Government.
- James Finlayson, Inspector, Her Majesty's Board of Inland Revenue.
- Jim Flanagan. For services to the Pottery Industry and to the community.
- Alan Hampson Fogg. For services to the Royal Philanthropic Society and to Young People.
- William James Forster, Superintendent. For services to the Police.
- Eunice Alice, Mrs. Fox, lately School Crossing Patrol, Nottinghamshire County Council. For services to Education.
- Peter Brian Fox, Chairman of Governors, Bishop Burton College, Yorkshire. For services to Agriculture and Agricultural Education.
- Margaret, Mrs. Francis. For services to the community particularly the Scouts, in Lapworth, Warwickshire.
- Peter Laing Fraser, Co-ordinator, Playback Services for the Blind. For services to Blind People.
- Captain John Edward Frost, Harbour Master, Milford Haven Port Authority. For services to the Ports Industry.
- John Lovel Gardiner, Technical Planning Manager, National Rivers Authority, Thames Region.
- William Gartshore, Depot Manager, Springbura Depot, British Rail Maintenance Ltd. For services to the Rail Industry.
- Christopher William Gaudion, Chief Fire Officer, Alderney.
- Dawn Heather Gibbins, Managing Director, Flowcrete Systems Ltd. For services to Industry.
- John Percy Gillett. For services to the British Film Institute.
- John David Gittus, lately Mapping and Charting Officer, Ordnance Survey, Department of the Environment.
- Keith Ainsworth Gledhill, D.L. For services to the community in Blackpool, Lancashire.
- Alison Helen Margaret, Mrs. Glen, lately Commissioner, Mental Welfare Commission for Scotland. For voluntary services to the Mentally 111.
- James Edward Glen, Head Verger, Lancaster Priory. For services to the community in Lancaster.
- Joseph Henry Gliddon, Member, Newton St. Cyres Parish Council, Exeter. For services to Local Government.
- Miss Patricia Newton Goate, Parish Councillor, Colyton, Devon. For services to Local Government. Archibald William *Charles Gooch, Chairman, Gooch and Housego Ltd. For services toTechnology and to Industry.
- May, Mrs. Good, Typist, Department of Social Security.
- Roger Tillyer Goodman, Chief Petty Officer and Instructor Sea Cadet Training School, Wroughton, Wiltshire.
- Reneira Hope Barbara, Mrs. Goonesena, Senior Librarian, Department of Trade and Industry.
- John Phillip Gosby, Station Officer (Retained), Oxfordshire Fire Brigade.
- Vera Elizabeth, Mrs. Gowers. For services to the community in Buckinghamshire.
- Douglas William Grace, Town Clerk, Buckingham Town Council. For services to Local Government.
- John Graham, Chairman, Local Review Committee, Polmont Young Offenders' Institution.
- Lorna Mary, Mrs. Graham, Staff Tutor in Music, Ayr Division of Strathclyde. For services to Music Education.
- Nathaniel Graham, E.R.D., lately Headteacher, Ashington Coulson Park County First School, Northumberland. For services to Education.
- Robert Graham, Project Manager, Ferranti International. For services to the Defence Industry.
- Anna Mary, Mrs. Gravell. For services to the community in Cardigan, Dyfed.
- David Frederick Gray, Assistant Director, Fire Protection Association. For services to Fire Safety.
- Hugh Waddell Gray. For services to the Boys' Brigade in Stirling.
- Miss Kathleen Gray. For political and public service.
- Margaret, Mrs. Gray, Customer Accounts Manager, Solent Division, Southern Electric plc. For services to the Electricity Industry.
- Christopher Roy Green, Stores Clerk, Remploy Ltd. and for services to People with Disabilities in Gwent.
- The Reverend Fred Pratt Green. For services to Hymnody.
- Frank Reid Greenaway. For services to Education.
- Christina Mary, Mrs. Greenman. For services to the University Hospital, Cardiff.
- Bruce Glendinning Grewar, Bridgemaster, Forth Road Bridge. For services to Road Transport.
- David Ernest Griffin, Support Manager Grade 1, Ministry of Agriculture, Fisheries and Food.
- Peter John Charles Griffin, Chairman, Chapeltown and Harehills Enterprises Ltd. For services to the Inner Cities.
- Douglas Gunary. For services to Agriculture.
- Miss Maureen Ann Gunary. For services to the community in Finchingfield, Essex.
- Dolly Mildred, Mrs. Haggerwood, Member, Uttlesford District Council. For services to Local Government.
- Gilbert James Haggett, Senior Valuation Executive, Her Majesty's Board of Inland Revenue.
- Margaret Anne, Mrs. Hall. For political and public service.
- Rod Gordon Hall, Production Supervisor, Engineering Department, British Airways plc and for services to Nature Conservation.
- William Fairgrieve Hall, Deputy Community Relations Officer, Royal Air Force, Laarbruch.
- James Johnston Halley. For services to Aviation History.
- Robert Hamilton, Manager, Harrison and Hetherington Ltd., Lockerbie. For services to Auctioneering.
- Anthony David Hampson, Treatment Manager, North West Water. For services to the Water Industry.
- Patrick David Hannan. For services to Journalism and Broadcasting in Wales.
- Joan Grace, Mrs. Hardy, Vice President, the Royal United Kingdom Beneficent Association. For services to the Elderly.
- Miss Georgina Brown Harley, lately Personal Assistant to the Joint Managing Director and Deputy Chairman, Matthew Gloag and Son Limited.
- Peter James Harpin, Managing Director, Zeus Aluminium Products Ltd. For services to the Metal Industry.
- Jean Margaret, Mrs. Harrington. For services to the Taff Ely Drug Support Group, Mid Glamorgan.
- Colonel Peter George Howard-Harwood, D.L. For political and public service.
- Margaret Eileen, Mrs. Haverly. For services to the community in Friern Barnet.
- Miss Rose Ivy Havis, Support Grade Band 2, Her Majesty's Board of Customs and Excise.
- Doris Mabel, Mrs. Hawker. For services to the community in Weybridge, Surrey.
- Alice Jane, Mrs. Haxby. For services to the Women's Royal Voluntary Service in Filey, Yorkshire.
- Ian Trevor Hayden, Equal Opportunities Adviser, Royal Mail Oxford, The Post Office. For services to Equal Opportunities.
- Peter Lawrence Heaps, News Engineer, Independent Television News. For services to Broadcasting.
- Miss Mary Hellier. For services to the Distressed Gentlefolk's Aid Association.
- Miss Anniss Irene Hemsley, Constable, Derbyshire Constabulary.
- Gerald Anthony William Hicks. For services to Sport and to the community in the South West of England.
- Leslie Roy Hicks, Head Warden, Fowey Coastal Estate, the National Trust. For services to Conservation.
- Geoffrey Martin Hill. For services to the community, particularly for Education and Training in Lancashire.
- Paul Joseph Hill, Founder-Director, Photographers' Place Workshop. For services to Photography.
- Michael John Hinds, Divisional Officer (Grade 1), Somerset Fire Brigade.
- William Henry Hobbs. For services to the Royal Gwent and St. Woolos Cardiology Fund and for charitable services to the community in South Wales.
- John Herbert Hogben, lately Member, London Borough of Redbridge. For services to Local Government.
- Alan Holland, Communications Officer, North West Water. For services to the Water Industry.
- Laurence Neil Hopkins, Production Services Manager, GEC Meters Ltd. For services to Industry and to Energy Efficiency.
- Ian Leslie Horner, Detective Sergeant, Metropolitan Police.
- Eileen, Mrs. Houghton. For services to the Homeless in Bristol.
- Kevin Paul Hourigan. For political service.
- Magnus Dunnet Houston, Crofters Commission Assessor. For services to Crofting.
- Miss Kathleen Monica Howard. For services to the British Red Cross Society in Nottinghamshire.
- Diane Eve, Mrs. Hughes, lately Executive Officer, Department of Health.
- Dudley Lloyd Hughes. For services to the community in Evesham, Worcestershire.
- Olivia Margarita, Mrs. Hughes, Secretary, Pathfinder Association. For services to ex-Service Men and Women.
- Sidney Knowles Hulme. For services to the community in Cheshire.
- Anthony Harry Humphreys, Principal Engineer, Hertfordshire County Council. For services to Road Design and Construction.
- Stan Hurrell. For services to the community in Westminster, London.
- Johnny Hutch, Acrobatics Director, the KOSH Theatre Company. For services to Dance-Drama.
- James Banbury Hynds. For services to the Elderly.
- Mary Elizabeth, Mrs. Irwin, School Cook Supervisor. For services to Education.
- Caroline Margaret, Mrs. Isaac. For services to the community in Crickhowell, Powys.
- Sheila, Mrs. Jackman, Chairman, League of Friends, Ongar War Memorial Hospital.
- Thomas Roland Jackson, Secretary, Soldiers', Sailors' and Airmen's Families Association, Blackpool.
- Arthur George Jakins. For services to the Neighbourhood Watch Scheme in South Yorkshire.
- Miss Rosemary James, Administrative Officer, Companies House Executive Agency, Department of Trade and Industry.
- Stephen Paul Jarrett, Superintendent, Royal National Mission to Deep Sea Fishermen, Brixham.
- Gillian, Mrs. Jeffreys. For services to Education in Powys.
- Gary Jelen. For services to Sport for People with Disabilities.
- Captain Douglas Richard Jennings, National Vice President, the Royal British Legion and Branch President, the Royal British Legion, Patchway, Bristol.
- Miss Muriel Briercliffe Jobling, D.L. For services to the community in Burnley, Lancashire.
- Sylvia May Rose, Mrs. Jobson, House Manageress, British Transport Police Force Training Centre, Tadworth. For services to the British Transport Police.
- Michael John Job, New Projects Manager, Lucas Electronics Division, Lucas Industries plc. For services to the Electronics Industry.
- Colin Johnson, Armature Winder, Parsons Turbine Generators Ltd. For services to Industry and to the Elderly in Newcastle upon Tyne.
- Doris, Mrs. Johnson, Secretary, Soldiers', Sailors' and Airmen's Families Association, Greenwich and Woolwich, London.
- Josiah John Johnston, Foreman Steelworker. For services to the Defence Industry.
- Pauline, Mrs. Johnston, District Occupational Therapist and Paramedical Services Manager, Nottingham City Hospital. For services to Health Care.
- Miss Diana Mary Jones, Secretary to the Chief Constable, Leicestershire Constabulary.
- Geraint Jones, Auxiliary Coastguard in Charge, Newquay, Dyfed.
- George William Albert Jones, Director, Contracts and Commercial Product Support Division, Smiths Industries. For services to the Defence Industry.
- John Owain Parry Jones, Head of Laboratory, Her Majesty's Stationery Office.
- William Eric Jones, Ganger, Forestry Commission.
- William Haydn Jones. For services to Agriculture in Wales.
- Madan Mohan Kalia. For services to the community in South London.
- Paul Mary Kavanagh, Senior Executive Officer, Department of Trade and Industry.
- Donald Frederick Kay, Administrative Officer, Metropolitan Police. For services to the Police.
- Henry Alexander Mills Keddie, Station Officer, Grampian Fire Brigade.
- Brian John Kemble, Joint Managing Director, Kemble and Company Ltd. For services to the Piano Manufacturing Industry.
- James Wood Kemlo, Assembler, NCR (Manufacturing) Ltd., and for charitable services to the community in Dundee.
- James Mario Kenny, Support Grade Band 1, Health and Safety Executive.
- William Kerr, lately Manager, Redundancy Schemes (Steel Industry), British Coal Corporation. For services to the Steel Industry.
- Alan Howard Keys. For services to Conservation.
- Leonard Samuel Keyworth, lately Second Principal Doorkeeper, House of Lords.
- David Robert Kilfoyle, Painter and Trade Union Convenor, British Nuclear Fuels Ltd. For services to the Nuclear Industry.
- John Francis William King, Senior Executive Officer, Ministry of Defence.
- Miss Kathleen Maria King, Senior Personal Secretary, Ministry of Defence.
- Richard Stanley King, lately Publicity and Tourism Officer, Great Yarmouth Borough Council. For services to Tourism.
- Simon Richard King, Convoy Driver and Fitter. For humanitarian services in the former Yugoslavia.
- Miss Nadine Kipling, Processing Systems Manager, Prescriptions Pricing Authority. For services to Industrial Relations.
- Arthur Alexander Kirby, Trustee, International Flight Catering Association. For services to Airline Catering.
- Valerie Lankester, Mrs. Knights. For services to the Acle Voluntary Aid Scheme, Norfolk.
- John (William Harry) Lamb, Area Roadside Services Manager (London), Automobile Association. For services to Motoring.
- Kenneth Lambert, Inspector Fitter, North Yorkshire Fire and Rescue Service.
- Miss Mary Eleanor Langman, Director and Trustee, Wholefood Trust. For services to the Organic Food Movement.
- Miss Rose Brigid Lavery. For services to Education.
- Christian Stuart Ross, Mrs. Lawley, Co-founder, Compassionate Friends. For services to Bereaved Parents.
- Sylvia, Mrs. Lawrence, School Crossing Patrol, Metropolitan Police, London. For services to Education.
- Charles Alan Le Maistre. For services to the community in Grouville, Jersey.
- Jean Leonie, Mrs. Le Maitre, Organiser, Women's Royal Voluntary Service, Guernsey Bailiwick.
- Miss Susan Leather, Member, MAFF's Consumer Panel. For services to Agriculture and to Food Safety.
- Raymond Norman Lee, Head of Flight Test, British Aerospace Defence Ltd. For services to the Defence Industry.
- Samuel Leighton. For services to the Royal Air Forces Association in Formby, Merseyside.
- Norman Lewis. For services to the Elderly.
- Sean Gordon Lewis. For services to Action Aid.
- Gustavo John Linares, Administrative Officer, Commander British Forces, Gibraltar.
- John Raymund Livesey, Organist and Choirmaster, St. Mary's Roman Catholic Church, Brownedge. For services to Church Music.
- John Loach, Chairman, F. F. Allsopp and Company Ltd. For services to the Printing Industry.
- Arthur Henry Lobb, lately Executive Officer, Crown Estate Commissioners.
- Arthur Albert Lockwood, Joint General Secretary, The Royal Sailors' Rest Home. For services to Ex-Service Men and Women.
- Mary Craig, Mrs. Logan, Director, Airfields Environment Federation and Director, Airfields Environment Trust. For services to Environmental Protection.
- Joe Lonergan. For political service.
- John Anthony Lovatt, First Engineer, National Power pic. For services to the Electricity Generating Industry.
- John Lowes, Sergeant, Northumbria Police.
- Jean Young, Mrs. Macfie, Member, Eastwood District Council. For services to Local Government.
- Helen Isabel, Mrs. Macgregor, District Organiser, Women's Royal Voluntary Service, Lochaber, Highland.
- Kenmuir Mackie, Engineering Director, Anderson Group Ltd. For services to the Mining Industry.
- Charles Maclean. For services to the community on the Isle of Jura.
- Murdo MacLennan, Sub-Officer (Retained), Strathclyde Fire Brigade.
- James Clement MacLeod. For political and public service.
- John MacMillan, Auxiliary Coastguard in Charge, Southend, Argyll.
- Surinder Lal Madan, lately Local Officer 1, Department of Social Security.
- Margaret Valentine, Mrs. Maggs, Foundation Governor, St. Edmund's Church of England Girls' Secondary School, Wiltshire and Leaden Hall School. For services to Education.
- Thomas Alfred Benjamin Mahoney, T.D. For services to Rugby Union Football in Bristol.
- Norman George Robertson Mair. For services to Sports Journalism in Scotland.
- Marion, Mrs. Malcolmson, Administrative Officer, Department of Employment.
- Gordon Mallinson, Constable, South Yorkshire Police.
- Eric John Manley, T.D. For political service.
- Alfred Lewis Mapledoram. For charitable services to the community in Salisbury.
- Miss Audrey Grace Martin, lately Personal Secretary, Institute of Naval Medicine.
- Robert Norman Martin, Sub-Divisional Officer, Avon and Somerset Special Constabulary.
- John Mather. For services to the Prison Service.
- Elizabeth, Mrs. Mathews, Chairman, Arthritis and Rheumatism Council for Research, Pangbourne, Berkshire.
- Gladys Gertrude, Mrs. Mathews, Shop Leader, OXFAM, Kingsbridge, Devon.
- Brian Leonard Mayne, Senior Site Manager, James Longley Company Ltd. For services to the Restoration of Hampton Court Palace.
- John James McAleer, Industrial Foreman, Department of the Environment.
- Anthony John McBride, Executive Officer, Department of Economic Development.
- Joan Emily Margaret, Mrs. McCarthy, Executive Officer, the Buying Agency, Department of the Environment.
- John William McCarthy, Curator, Birmingham Central Library. For services to Librarianship.
- Elizabeth, Mrs. McClelland. For services to the Race Against Multiple Sclerosis and for services to the community.
- Alistair McCoist. For services to Association Football.
- Cyril McCombe. For services to the Foundry Industry.
- Dalton McKinley McConney, Inspector, Metropolitan Police.
- Ann, Mrs. McCormack, Chairman, South Cleveland Hospital Voluntary Services. For services to Voluntary Health Care.
- George McCormick, Reserve Constable. For services to the Police.
- John McCready, Referrals Co-ordinator, State Hospital Carstairs. For services to Health Care.
- William Desmond McCreesh, Chief Superintendent. For services to the Police.
- Matilda Irene, Mrs. McCullough. For services to Swimming and Life Saving.
- Mary, Mrs. McCullough, Mess Manageress, Royal Armoured Corps Training Regiment Officers' Mess. For services to the Army.
- Margaret Muriel, Mrs. McCutcheon, Staff Officer, Department of the Environment.
- Margaret Shirley Ramsay, Mrs. McEwan, General Medical Practitioner in Dundee. For services to Medicine.
- Stewart Fletcher McFarlane. For services to the community in Saltburn, Cleveland.
- Morag, Mrs. McGowan. For services to Young People in Wishaw, Lanarkshire.
- The Reverend Thomas Stewart McGregor, Hospital Chaplain, Royal Infirmary of Edinburgh.
- Barry (Finbar Patrick) McGuigan, President, Professional Boxers' Association. For services to Boxing.
- Gibson Cobb McIntosh. For services to the community in Strathdon, Aberdeenshire.
- Thomas Cunningham McKee. For services to Health Care.
- Michael McKendrick, General Medical Practitioner in Northumberland. For services to Medicine.
- Miss Eileen McKenna, Surgical Ward Sister, Queen Elizabeth Hospital, Gateshead. For services to Health Care.
- Miss Margaret Jean McKinney, Academy Secretary, Royal West of England Academy. For services to Art.
- Alexander McLachlan, Higher Scientific Officer, Royal Observatory, Edinburgh. For services to Science.
- Lieutenant Commander Alastair Stephen McLean. For political service.
- Miss Katherine Wilson McNeil. For services to Ladies' Golf.
- Jack McNicol. For voluntary services to the Scottish Association for the Care and Resettlement of Offenders, H.M. Prison Greenock.
- Beryl Sylvia Louise, Mrs. McPhail. For political and public service.
- George Robert McSporran, Auxiliary Coastguard in Charge, Campbeltown, Argyll.
- Jennifer Clare, Mrs. McVeigh. For voluntary services to the Citizen's Advice Bureau, Brighton.
- William McWatters, Honorary Secretary, Roxburgh District Committee, Duke of Edinburgh Award Scheme. For services to Young People.
- Ernest John Medlock, Higher Executive Officer, Department of Employment.
- David William Meeke, Sergeant. For services to the Police.
- Brian Middleton. For services to the community in North Tyneside.
- Peter George Middleton, Director, British Materials Handling Board. For services to the Materials Handling Industry.
- Kenneth Arthur Miles, Dental Technician, Regent Dental Ltd. For services to the Dental Profession.
- Barbara Elizabeth, Mrs. Miller, Norwich City Guide. For services to Tourism.
- Eileen, Mrs. Miller, Company Secretary, Cloverhall Tenants' Association Co-operative Ltd., Rochdale.
- Robert Milligan. For services to the British Limbless Ex-Servicemen's Association in Glasgow.
- Miss Linda Joyce Mitchell, Supervisor, Text Preparation Centre, Surrey Constabulary. For services to the Police.
- Phillip Martin Mitchell, Road Sweeper, Midhurst, West Sussex. For services to the community in Midhurst.
- John Frederick Arthur Moore. For services to the community in Newark, Nottinghamshire.
- Eileen, Mrs. Moorhouse, lately Higher Executive Officer, Employment Service, Department of Employment.
- Doris, Mrs. Morris. For services to Young People in Wales.
- Kenneth John Morris. For services to the community, particularly the Scouts, in Gloucestershire.
- Lawton Morris. For services to Young People in Wales.
- Iris Lucy, Mrs. Moss. For services to the agricultural community in Surrey and Sussex.
- Owen Patrick Murray, Production Manager, Remploy Ltd. and for charitable services in North East England.
- John Murrell, Deputy Head, John Henry Newman Grant Maintained Roman Catholic School, Stevenage, Hertfordshire. For services to Education.
- Sarjit Singh Myrrpurey, Director, West Glamorgan Race Equality Council. For services to Race Relations.
- Agnes, Mrs. Neillie, Senior Cleaner, Duncan of Jordanstone College. For services to Education.
- Reginald Albert Newby, lately Assistant to the Lord Lieutenant, Warwickshire.
- Dennis Charles Arthur Newman, Leading Firefighter (Retained), Kent Fire Brigade.
- Veronica Anne Robertson, Mrs. Nicholas, Training and Development Manager, Commonwealth Development Corporation.
- Colonel John Wilmot Nicol, D.S.O., D.L. For services to the community in Aboyne, Aberdeenshire.
- Harold Nightingale. For services to Bulkeley and Ridley Parish Council, Cheshire.
- James Brian Norman. For services to promoting educational links between the United Kingdom and Hungary.
- Leslie John Norman, Leading Chargehand Electrical Fitter, Defence Research Agency, Farnborough.
- Doris Emily, Mrs. O'Brien, Catering Assistant, Government Hospitality Fund.
- Dorothy Mary, Mrs. O'Connell. For services to the Citizens' Advice Bureau in Portsmouth.
- Clive O'Connor. For political service.
- Stuart Edwin Ogden, Coxswain, Scarborough Lifeboat, Royal National Lifeboat Institution.
- George Ogston, Janitor, Mile End Primary School, Aberdeen. For services to Education.
- Miss Beryl Frances Osborne, Support Grade Band 2, Government Car Service, Department of the Environment.
- Miss Mavis Owen. For services to the Friends of the Community, Tenby and Saundersfoot, Dyfed.
- Robert Malcolm Owen, General Manager, Drives and Rotating Machines, Siemens plc. For services to the Defence Industry.
- Phyllis May, Mrs. Owens. For services to the community in Castle Point, Essex.
- Sumanlal Bhagwanji Pancholi, Executive Officer, Department of Employment.
- Anthony Trevor Pannell, lately Auxiliary Officer and Unit Officer in Charge, Royal Naval Auxiliary Service, Portsmouth.
- Danny Lyn Papworth, Sergeant, Warwickshire Constabulary.
- Margaret Rose, Mrs. Parker, Staff Officer, Valuation Office Agency, Her Majesty's Board of Inland Revenue.
- Frank Parkinson, Caretaker, Mowbray Special School, Bedale, North Yorkshire. For services to Education.
- Manibhai Talashibhai Patel. For political and public service.
- Vengidusamy Ambiga Pathy, Higher Executive Officer, Solicitor's Office, Department of Social Security.
- Ronald Geoffrey Payne, Professional and Technology Officer, Agricultural and Food Research Council's Institute of Food Research. For services to Science.
- John Leonard Pearson, lately Section Officer, Norfolk Special Constabulary.
- Sheila Mary, Mrs. Peck, lately Support Manager 3, Department for Education.
- Derrick Roch Penrose, Agent for the Trustees, Chatsworth Settlement, Derbyshire. For services to Agriculture and to the Chatsworth Estate.
- Margaret Mary, Mrs. Pepperday. For services to the care of Young People.
- Anthony Charles Peters, Stores Manager, Rutherford Appleton Laboratory, Science and Engineering Research Council. For services to Science.
- Neville John Peters. For services to the Church of England.
- Patricia Margret, Mrs. Phillips, Divisional Officer, South Wales and Western Division, Union of Shop, Distributive and Allied Workers. For services to Industrial Relations.
- Miss Karen Denise Pickering. For services to Swimming.
- Stanley Pickles, Volunteer Observer, Meteorological Office, Yorkshire.
- Rita Ann, Mrs. Piepe, Senior Accommodation Officer, University of Portsmouth.
- Frederick Harold Pitcher. For services to People with Disabilities in Walsall.
- Miss Pamela Plumb, Typist, Office of Public Service and Science.
- John Peter Poison, Water Superintendent, Highland Regional Council and for services to the community in Golspie and East Sutherland.
- Christa, Mrs. Pope. For services to the Women's Royal Voluntary Service in Herefordshire.
- Marjorie Broadbent, Mrs. Porter. For services to the community.
- Miss Valerie Helene Potter, Departmental Secretary, University College London.
- Carol Elizabeth, Mrs. Pottinger, Manager, Challenge House, British Red Cross Society, Nottinghamshire.
- Anne Mayhew, Mrs. Powell. For services to the community in Burley, Hampshire.
- David John Prescott, Deputy Director and Secretary, B.E.N. Motor and Allied Trades Benevolent Fund.
- John Thomas Prestwich. For services to People with Disabilities.
- Frank Freeman Price. For humanitarian services in the former Yugoslavia.
- William Prosser. For services to Rugby Union Football and the community in Bognor Regis.
- Albert Leslie Quick. For services to Swimming in Liverpool.
- Miss Stella Francis Rand, lately Auxiliary Officer, Royal Naval Auxiliary Service, Harwich.
- James Donald Rankine, lately Higher Professional and Technology Officer, Scottish Office.
- Marjorie, Mrs. Ravensdale, Catering Liaison Officer, Kent Constabulary. For services to the Police.
- Joan, Mrs. Reader, Emergency Services Organiser, Women's Royal Voluntary Service, Sheffield.
- Miss Beryl Moira Smith Rees. For services to Goldsmiths' College, University of London.
- John Regis. For services to Athletics.
- David Reid, Registrar, Hearing Aid Council. For services to Consumer Protection.
- Thomas Cyril Richardson. For services to Salcare and to the community in Heanor, Derbyshire.
- Mavice, Mrs. Ridgway, Chairman, Macclesfield Society for the Blind. For services to the community in Macclesfield.
- Barry Albert Edward Ridout, Higher Executive Officer, Department of Social Security.
- Brinley Maurice Rixon, Prison Officer, Her Majesty's Prison Spring Hill.
- Alan Roberts, Auxiliary Coastguard in Charge, Portreath, Cornwall.
- Dorothy, Mrs. Roberts, Higher Executive Officer, Welsh Office.
- Eileen, Mrs. Roberts, Organiser, Kensington and Chelsea Volunteer Bureau, London.
- Eryl Gwynfor Roberts, Principal Engineer, British Aerospace Defence Ltd. For services to the Defence Industry.
- Margaret, Mrs. Roberts. For services to the community and the Ruthin Hospital League of Friends, North Wales.
- Maureen Joan, Mrs. Roberts, Senior Personal Secretary, Department of Transport.
- Owen John Roberts, Forest Officer III, Forestry Commission.
- William John Roberts, lately Coxswain, Moelfre Lifeboat, Gwynedd.
- Pamela Elizabeth Roberta, Mrs. Robinson. For services to Agriculture.
- William Robinson, Support Grade Band 1, Department of Economic Development.
- Robert William Robson, Colliery Manager, Bilsthorpe Colliery, British Coal Corporation. For services to the Coal Industry.
- Sheila Mary Harley, Mrs. Robson. For services to the Lincolnshire Free Press.
- Miss Margaret Hillary Roden. For services to the Disabled Drivers Voluntary Advisory Service.
- Michael Daniel Rodgers. For humanitarian services in the former Yugoslavia.
- Celestin Rupert Romain, Senior Craftsman, Royal Mint.
- Miss Frances Avril Ross, Senior Personal Secretary, Ministry of Defence.
- Thomas Eric Roughley, lately Assistant Director, Data Archive, University of Essex. For services to Information Technology.
- Mervyn Round. For charitable services to the community in Sheffield.
- Ronald James Rouse, Divisional Officer, Amalgamated Electric and Engineering Union. For services to Industrial Relations.
- Vera, Mrs. Sadler, Receptionist, Federation of Civil Engineering Contractors.
- Charles Gilbert Duncan Sandison, D.L. For services to the Island of Unst and Shetland.
- Michael Saunders, Assistant Group Scout Leader, 1st Chalfont St Giles Scouts. For services to Scouting in Chalfont St. Giles.
- Vera Eileen, Mrs. Saunders. For services to the Women's Royal Voluntary Service in Niton, Isle of Wight.
- Johnston Scott. For services to Amateur Athletics,
- Miss Tegwen Scourfield. For services to the community in Llangollen, North Wales.
- Miss Elizabeth Anne Scullion. For services to Guiding in Midlothian.
- Vera, Mrs. Semple. For services to Education.
- Marion, Mrs. Shanks, Headteacher, Ravenswood Primary School, Cumbernauld. For services to Education.
- John Michael Sharman, Course Director, Engineering Department, Cambridge University. For services to Engineering Education.
- The Reverend Charles Edward Shaw. For services to the community in Oldham.
- Kenneth Norman Shelley. For services to Young People in Clwyd.
- Mildred, Mrs. Sherrard. For services to OXFAM.
- Leslie David Sherratt. For humanitarian services in the former Yugoslavia.
- Anthony George Lithgow Shore, Restructuring Director, Rolling Stock Companies, British Railways Board. For services to the Rail Industry.
- Linette May, Mrs. Simms. For services to the community in Clapham, London.
- Joan, Mrs. Simpson. For charitable services.
- Archie Victor Skinner. For services to the National Trust at Sheffield Park Garden and to Horticulture.
- Richard Barry Skinner, Administrative Officer, Her Majesty's Board of Customs and Excise.
- Geoffrey Hugh Smerdon, General Medical Practitioner and Chairman, Cornwall Council on Alcohol. For services to Medicine.
- Austin Smith, lately Ward Assistant, Radcliffe Infirmary, Oxford. For services to Health Care.
- Donald Smith, Superintendent, Yarrow Shipbuilders Ltd. For services to the Defence Industry.
- Edith Maud, Mrs. Smith, Chef 2, Foreign and Commonwealth Office.
- The Reverend Io Mavornie Smith. For services to the community in Waltham Forest, London.
- Margaret Lillias, Mrs. Smith, Music Secretary, University of East Anglia. For services to Music.
- Robert Nicol Smith, Sub-Officer (Retained), Tayside Fire Brigade.
- Sandra Jaqueline, Mrs. Smith, General Manager, Portsmouth Information Technology Centre. For services to Training.
- Wilfrid Smurthwaite. For services to the community in Shotley, Northumberland.
- Miss Joan Ethel Smelling. For services to the community in Sherborne, Dorset.
- Jack Sokell. For services to Cricket in Yorkshire.
- Miss Cheryl St Clair, Director and Secretary, Providence Row Housing Association, London. For services to Homeless People.
- Josephine, Mrs. Stackhouse. For services to the community in Walsall.
- Brian Michael Staines, Committee Member, Friends of the London Transport Museum. For services to the London Transport Museum.
- Joseph Cliffe Stead. For services to Road Safety in Lancashire.
- Miss Jeanette Margaret Stewart, lately Personal Secretary, Department of Economic Development.
- Frederick George Stocker. For services to Deaf People.
- Miss Jeanette Margaret Storrier, lately General Administrative Assistant, Dundee Dental Hospital. For services to Health Care.
- Miss Shirley Stott, lately Senior Storekeeper, 42 Signal Squadron (V), 33 Signal Regiment (V), Ministry of Defence.
- James Mclnroy Strachan, Civilian Fingerprint Officer, Fife Constabulary. For services to the Police.
- Gertrude, Mrs. Surma, lately Executive Officer, Welsh Office.
- Mimi, Mrs. Sutton, Chairman, Soldiers', Sailors' and Airmen's Families Association, Hartlepool.
- Patricia, Mrs. Sutton, Local Officer 2, Department of Social Security.
- Foster Gordon Sweet, Trustee, Sea Cadet Corps, Falmouth and Penryn.
- Dorothy Rose, Mrs. Symes. For services to the Women's Royal Voluntary Service in Hampshire.
- Alan Taylor, Principal Prison Officer, Her Majesty's Prison Ranby.
- Alec Taylor. For services to Scouting in Norton, Doncaster.
- Mark Taylor, Operator Setter and Leading Hand, Pall Ilfracombe Ltd.
- Norman Taylor, Chief Inspector, Northumbria Police.
- Henry Joseph Teasdale, Head Forester to the Earl of Shaftesbury. For services to Forestry.
- Albert John Tempest. For services to Architecture.
- Roy Terry, lately Fleet Manager, Sussex Police. For services to the Police.
- Cynthia Joan, Mrs. Thomas, Nurse Manager, Renal Unit, the Children's Hospital, Birmingham. For services to Health Care.
- David George Calvin-Thomas. For services to the community in Wallingford, Oxfordshire.
- John Ronald Thomas, President, Welsh Association of Visually Handicapped Bowlers. For services to Bowling and to People with Disabilities.
- Miss Mary Josephine Thomas. For voluntary services in Pembrokeshire.
- Malcolm Thompson. For political and public service.
- Edward Thomson. For services to the Community in Cuminestown, Aberdeenshire.
- Robert Alexander Dick Thomson. For political and public service.
- David John Tinson, Head of Planning, Bromley Hospitals NHS Trust. For services to Health Care.
- Miss Anne Tipper, Secretary to the Chief Constable, Thames Valley Police.
- June Anne, Mrs. Tonge. For services to the community in Stafford.
- Peter Toolan, lately Higher Executive Officer, Her Majesty's Prison Thorp Arch.
- George William Trotter, Support Grade Band 2, Home Office.
- Adrian Stewart Tulloch. For services to Scottish Youth Football.
- Robert John Tulloch. For services to Nature Conservation in Shetland.
- Peter Tunnah, Parks Manager, St. Edmundsbury Borough Council, Suffolk. For services to Local Government.
- Fred Turnbull. For services to Industry in North East England.
- Miss Angela Frances Sylvia Turner, Commandant, Special Constabulary, Sussex.
- Edward Turner. For services to Local Government.
- Francis Michael Turner. For services to Cricket in Leicestershire.
- Peter Scott Turner, Director of Sales, Flight Refuelling Ltd. For services to the Defence Industry.
- Kenneth Alexander Munro Urquhart, Director of Health and Safety, Clugston Group Ltd. For services to Industrial Health and Safety.
- Roy Herbert Usher, Principal Doorkeeper, Serjeant at Arms Department, House of Commons.
- Margaret, Mrs. Uttley, Group Manager, Home Care Service, Berkshire. For services to Home Care.
- Howard John Vale, Sub Officer (Retained), Warwickshire Fire Service.
- Eric George Vassar, Vice Chairman, Oaklands College Corporation, Hertfordshire. For services to Further Education.
- Dirk Vettevinkel. For political service.
- Norman Frederick Vincent, lately Senior Technician, Norfolk County Council. For services to Road Transport.
- Iris Jacqueline, Mrs. Wagstaffe. For services to the Elderly in Derbyshire.
- Donald Arthur Wain, Chairman, Economic Development sub-Committee, Chesterfield Borough Council. For services to Local Government.
- Gerald Desmond Wake, Foster Parent, Devon County Council. For services to Young People.
- Patricia Rosemary, Mrs. Wake, Foster Parent, Devon County Council. For services to Young People.
- Eric John Walker, lately Driver, Her Majesty's Naval Base, Portsmouth, Ministry of Defence.
- Gerald James Walker, Associate Editor and Editorial Training Officer, Evening Chronicle, Bath. For services to Journalism.
- Marjorie Shiona, Mrs. Wallace, Chief Executive SANE. For services to the Mentally Ill.
- Jack Louis Wallworth. For services to the community in Stockport, Cheshire.
- Jemima, Mrs. Walterson. For services to the community in Shetland.
- Dorothy, Mrs. Walton. For services to the community in Sheffield.
- Netty, Mrs. Warburg. For services to the Royal Marsden Hospital Cancer Fund Appeal.
- Sonny Warner. For services to the Manchester Jewish Social Services.
- Mabel, Mrs. Warren. For services to the community in Mitcham, Surrey.
- Tony Warren, Writer. For services to Television Drama.
- Philip Wayre, Founder and Chairman, Otter Trust. For services to Conservation.
- Leslie Edgar Wellington, lately Observer, Royal Observer Corps, Truro, Cornwall.
- Leslie John Wells, Safety Representative for Airport Ramp Workers, British Airways pic, Heathrow Airport. For services to Industrial Health and Safety.
- Michael Alan Wells, Process and General Supervisory Grade D, Defence Research Agency.
- Lieutenant Colonel Royston John Welsh. For services to the community in Cardiff.
- Lieutenant Commander David Granville West. For political service.
- Beryl, Mrs. Westcott, Cleaner, Sittingbourne County Court, Lord Chancellor's Department.
- Ann, Mrs . Wheatcroft. For services to the Groundwork Discovery Centre, Macclesfield.
- Elizabeth Margaret, Mrs. Wheatley, Deputy Director of Appeals, Forces Help Society and Lord Roberts Workshops.
- James Horace When. For services to the community in Herefordshire.
- Miss Doreen Lilian White, Executive Assistant to the Chairman, British Telecommunications plc. For services to the Telecommunications Industry.
- Ishbel, Mrs. White, Health Visitor, Greater Glasgow Community and Mental Health Services NHS Trust. For services to Health Care.
- Joyce Mary, Mrs. White, B.E.M., District Organiser, Women's Royal Voluntary Service, Gosport.
- David Moore Whiteside, Administrative Officer, Royal Air Force.
- Maureen, Mrs. Wildman, lately Administrative Officer, Ministry of Defence.
- Clarice Betty, Mrs. Williams. For services to MENCAP in Salisbury.
- Glenda Edith, Mrs. Williams. For services to the Royal National Lifeboat Institution, Llanidloes, Powys.
- Joan Dorothy, Mrs. Williams. For services to the National Trust at Attingham Park, Shropshire.
- Percival Lionel Williams. For services to the community, particularly Young People, in Cornwall.
- Audrey Sara, Mrs. Wilshaw. For services to the Women's Royal Voluntary Service in Flushing and Falmouth, Cornwall.
- Robert Edward McNeill Wilson. For services to scouting and to the community in Newcastle upon Tyne.
- Thomas Albert Wilson. For services to Local Government.
- Michael Woodman, Engineering Services Manager, Cranfleld University. For services to Higher Education.
- Colin William Wortley, District Maintenance Manager, Corporation of Trinity House, Penzance. For services to Trinity House.
- Brian Crawford Wright, Business Manager, GEC Marconi Defence Systems Ltd. For services to the Defence Industry.
- John Angus Wylie, Director of External Relations, University of Paisley. For services to Higher Education.
- Miss Margaret Young. For services to Scottish Historiography.
- John Ludovic MacDonald Younie, Farmer. For services to Agriculture and to Conservation in Inverness.
- Susan, Mrs. Yoxall, Neighbourhood Watch Co-ordinator, South Norwood, London.

=== Royal Red Cross ===
==== Member of the Royal Red Cross (RRC) ====
- Claire Mavis Taylor, Principal Nursing Officer, A.R.R.C., Queen Alexandra's Royal Naval Nursing Service.
- Colonel lona Mary LEITH-MACGREGOR (490474), late Queen Alexandra's Royal Army Nursing Corps.

==== Associate of the Royal Red Cross (ARRC) ====
- 24162890 Warrant Officer Class 1 Peter Charles COOPER, Queen Alexandra's Royal Army Nursing Corps.
- Major Jean Danskin THORNTON (468868), Queen Alexandra's Royal Army Nursing Corps (since retired).
- Squadron Leader Wendy Elizabeth JOY (0409028), Princess Mary's Royal Air Force Nursing Service.

=== Queen's Police Medal (QPM) ===
England And Wales

- Ralph Charles Barrington, Detective Chief Superintendent, Essex Police.
- Hugh Neville Linton Blenkin, 3 Area Headquarters, Metropolitan Police.
- Trevor Cutts, Detective Superintendent, Nottinghamshire Constabulary.
- Anthony Michael Grey, Deputy Chief Constable, Warwickshire Constabulary.
- Dennis George Gunn, Chief Constable, Cambridgeshire Constabulary.
- Peter John Henry Holmes, Inspector, 5 Area, Metropolitan Police.
- Michael Kenneth Jenkins, Detective Chief Superintendent, West Midlands Police.
- Clive Rowland Kingswood, Detective Sergeant, West Yorkshire Police.
- Jeffrey Meadows, Chief Superintendent, Lancashire Constabulary.
- David John Mellish, Deputy Chief Constable, Northumbria Police.
- Alan Parker, Deputy Chief Constable, British Transport Police.
- Maurice George Parsons, Superintendent, 5 Area, Metropolitan Police.
- Gwilym Eifion Pritchard, Deputy Chief Constable, Dyfed Powys Police.
- Peter Samuel sharpe, Deputy Chief Constable, Surrey Police.
- Barry Dennis DeCourcy Shaw, Chief Constable, Cleveland Constabulary.
- Peter Francis Smither, Senior Instructor (Supt), Police Branch, Counter Terrorist Search Wing, RSME, Chattenden.
- Mark Toker, Constable, Cheshire Constabulary.
- David Christopher Veness, Assistant Commissioner, Specialist Operations, Metropolitan Police.

Northern Ireland

- Robert James Ballantine, Superintendent, Royal Ulster Constabulary.
- Thomas Robert Robinson, Superintendent, Royal Ulster Constabulary.

Overseas

- David Deptford, Chief Superintendent, Royal Hong Kong Police.
- Douglas Lau Yuk-kuen, Assistant Commissioner, Royal Hong Kong Police.
- Basil Francis Lim Sak-yeung, Assistant Commissioner, Royal Hong Kong Police.
- Benny Ng Ching-kwok, Chief Superintendent, Royal Hong Kong Police.

Scotland

- Graham Power, Deputy Chief Constable (Temporary), Lothian and Borders Police.
- Andrew Mathieson, Assistant Chief Constable, Fife Constabulary.

=== Queen's Fire Service Medal (QFSM) ===
England And Wales

- James Lynn Ashfield, Senior Divisional Officer, Royal Berkshire Fire Service.
- Kenneth Arthur Harrison, Deputy Chief Officer, Humberside Fire Service.
- Edwin Patterson, Chief Fire Officer, Nottinghamshire Fire Service.
- Michael John Pilley, Assistant Chief Officer, South Yorkshire Fire Service.
- Charles William Spence, Station Officer, Durham County Fire and Rescue Brigade.

Overseas

- Paul Chan Hoi, Chief Fire Officer, Hong Kong Fire Service.

Scotland

- Robert Gordon, Deputy Firemaster, Highlands and Islands Fire Brigade.

=== Colonial Police and Fire Service Medal (CPM) ===
- John Edward Burton, Superintendent, Royal Hong Kong Police Force.
- Chan Kwok-kan, Senior Superintendent (Auxiliary), Royal Hong Kong Police Force.
- Cheung Chiu-wai, Station Sergeant, Royal Hong Kong Police Force.
- Chiang Kwok-keung, Superintendent, Royal Hong Kong Police Force.
- Kedith Chow Keng-kan, Superintendent, Royal Hong Kong Police Force.
- Martin Swinnerton Cowley, Senior Superintendent, Royal Hong Kong Police Force.
- Michael Harold Francis, Senior Superintendent, Royal Hong Kong Police Force.
- Ho King-san, Principal Fireman, Hong Kong Fire Services.
- Kwok Jing-keung, Senior Divisional Officer, Hong Kong Fire Services.
- Kwok Yiu-wai, Station Sergeant, Royal Hong Kong Police Force.
- Lam Yim-fat, Chief Inspector, Royal Hong Kong Police Force.
- Lau Yui-ki, Station Sergeant, Royal Hong Kong Police Force.
- Lee Ming-kwai, Chief Superintendent, Royal Hong Kong Police Force.
- Leung Sum, Inspector, Royal Hong Kong Police Force.
- Lo Sik-lun, Principal Fireman, Hong Kong Fire Services.
- Neil Edward Harrell Mccabe, Chief Superintendent, Royal Hong Kong Police Force.
- John Ng Sheung-lok, Superintendent, Royal Hong Kong Police Force.
- Norman Alexander Rae, Senior Superintendent, Royal Hong Kong Police Force.
- Jeffrey Sanders, Chief Inspector, Bermuda Police Force.
- Campbell DeCosta Simons, Superintendent, Bermuda Police Force.
- Sin King-ki, Station Sergeant, Royal Hong Kong Police Force.
- Ian James Stenton, Superintendent, Royal Hong Kong Police Force.
- Tsang Loi-fuk, Chief Inspector, Royal Hong Kong Police Force.
- Wong Tim-fat, Superintendent, Royal Hong Kong Police Force.
- Wu Kwong-cheung, Station Sergeant, Royal Hong Kong Police Force

== Grenada ==
=== Order of the British Empire ===
==== Officer of the Order of the British Empire (OBE) ====
- Benedict Patrick Compton. For services to teaching.
- Samuel Joseph. For services to agriculture.

==== Member of the Order of the British Empire (MBE) ====
- Miss Stella Estella Best. For services to nursing.

== Papua New Guinea ==
=== Order of St Michael and St George ===
==== Knight Grand Cross of the Order of St Michael and St George (GCMG) ====
- The Right Honourable Sir Julius Chan, K.B.E., M.P. For distinguished services to Papua New Guinea.

=== Order of the British Empire ===
==== Knight Commander of the Order of the British Empire (KBE) ====
- The Honourable John Rumet Kaputin, C.M.G., M.P. For services to the community, the public service and politics.

==== Commander of the Order of the British Empire (CBE) ====
- The Honourable Masket Iangalio, M.P. For services to the community and politics.
- The Honourable Michael Ogio, M.P. For services to the community and politics.

==== Officer of the Order of the British Empire (OBE) ====
- Kila, Mrs. Amini, M.B.E. For services to the community and the Papua New Guinea Young Women's Christian Association.
- Lohia Hitolo. For public service.
- Goetz Von Schweinfurth. For services to the government and the community.

==== Member of the Order of the British Empire (MBE) ====
- Kaminiel Atai. For services to local government and the community.
- Gundu Kagl Guenu. For services to the community.
- Inspector Tom Kargo. For services to the Papua New Guinea correctional services.
- Iammo Gapi, Mrs. Launa, B.E.M. For outstanding contribution to the development and administration of sport.
- Michael John Mayberry. For services to the community and the country.
- Pena Ou. For services to politics and the community.
- William Penias. For services to education.
- Timothy Boni Poesi. For services to education.
- Bennie Takin. For services to the development of Cheshire Homes and to disabled children.

=== British Empire Medal (BEM) ===
Civil Division

- Aino Babo. For services to the community.
- Miss Grace Guise. For services to the national airline.
- Michael Karukuru Ivaroa. For services to the church and the community.
- Daag Kapoiam. For services to the community, the public services and the Papua New Guinea Boy Scouts.
- Miss Jenny Koia. For services to the national airline.
- Joachim Krasause. For services to the community
- Manita Mana. For services to Government House.
- Bernard Pahau. For public services.
- Chief Inspector Nobert Waimangu. For services to the Papua New Guinea correctional services.

Military Division

- Chief Warrant Officer Paul Amasalu Yangoeng Asoh, Papua New Guinea Defence Force.

=== Queen's Police Medal (QPM) ===
- Metropolitan Superintendent Joseph Kupo. For services to the community and the Royal Papua New Guinea Constabulary.

== Solomon Islands ==
=== Order of the British Empire ===
==== Officer of the Order of the British Empire (OBE) ====
- Pulepada Ghemu. For services to the Seventh Day Adventist Church, the community and national politics.

== Tuvalu ==
=== Order of the British Empire ===
==== Officer of the Order of the British Empire (OBE) ====
- The Honourable Otinielu Tautele Tausi. For services to the community, public service and to the political development of the country.

==== Member of the Order of the British Empire (MBE) ====
- Doctor Tiliga Pulusi. For services to public health and medical services,
- Iuta Tanielu. For services to the community and to the political development of the country.

== Belize ==
=== Order of the British Empire ===
==== Commander of the Order of the British Empire (CBE) ====
- Miss Kathleen Elswith Victoria Frazer, J.P. For services to the community.

==== Officer of the Order of the British Empire (OBE) ====
- Athelo (Miss Telo) Smith, Mrs. Cabral. For services to the community.
- Clare, Mrs. Moody. For services to the community.

==== Member of the Order of the British Empire (MBE) ====
- Olid Alvarado. For services to the community.
- Juan de la Cruz Blanco. For services to the community.
- Fidel Delphin Flores. For services to the community.
