= Manley =

Manley may refer to:

- Manley (surname)
- Manley (given name)
- Manley, Cheshire, England, a village and civil parish
- Manley, Devon, a location in England
- Manley, Illinois, United States, an unincorporated community
- Manley, Minnesota, United States, a former community
- Manley, Nebraska, United States, a village
- Manley & Associates, a former video game developer
- Manley Career Academy High School, Chicago, Illinois
- Manley Hot Springs, Alaska, United States, a census-designated place
- Manley Laboratories, a manufacturer of pro and high-end audio equipment
- USS Manley (TB-23), a torpedo boat purchased in 1898
- USS Manley (DD-74), a Caldwell-class destroyer commissioned in 1917
- USS Manley (DD-940), a Forrest Sherman-class destroyer commissioned in 1957

== See also ==
- USS Manley, a list of US Navy ships
- Manly (disambiguation)
