= Manish (disambiguation) =

Manish is a Hindu masculine given name.

Manish or Maneesh can also refer to:

- Manish (band), a Japanese power-pop band
- Serena-Maneesh, a rock band from Norway
  - Serena Maneesh (album)
- XXXtra Manish, a 1994 album by Little Bruce

== See also ==
- Manisha, feminine form of the given name
- Maneesh Agrawala, Indian-American computer scientist
- Maneesh Gobin, Indian-Mauritian politician
- Maneesh Sharma, Indian filmmaker
- K. Maneesha, Indian badminton player
- Maneesha S. Inamdar, Indian academic
- Manly (disambiguation)
- Manx (disambiguation)
