= Manly (surname) =

Manly is a surname, and may refer to:

- Alan Manly (born 1950), Australian author and computer engineer
- Alexander Manly (1866–1944), American newspaper owner
- Alexandra Manly (born 1996), Australian cyclist
- Alice Elfrida Manly (1846 – 1932), English painter
- Basil Manly Sr. (1798–1868), American minister
- Basil Manly Jr. (1825–1892), American religious leader and educator
- Cathy Manly (born 1973), Burkinabé writer
- Charles Manly (1795–1871), American lawyer and politician from North Carolina
- Charles Macdonald Manly (1855–1924), Canadian painter
- Charles H. Manly (1843–1930), American politician from Michigan
- Charles M. Manly (1876–1927), American engineer and flight pioneer
- Jack Manly (born 2004), English footballer
- James Manly (born 1932), Canadian politician
- Jennifer Manly, American neuropsychologist
- John Matthews Manly (1865–1940), American professor of English literature
- Lewis Manly (1903–1970), American athlete and academic economist
- Matthias Evans Manly (1801–1881), American judge
- Paul Manly (born 1964), Canadian politician, son of James Manley
- Ralza M. Manly (1822–1897), American minister and educator
- William L. Manly (1820–1903), American western pioneer

== See also ==
- Manley (surname)
