= Manley (surname) =

Manley as a surname of English origin, as well as a variant of the Irish surname Munnelly. People with this surname include:

- Abe Manley (1885–1952), American Negro league baseball owner
- Alexandra, Countess of Frederiksborg (born Alexandra Christina Manley in 1964), former wife of Prince Joachim of Denmark
- Alvin Manley (born 1971), American boxer and two-time National Golden Gloves Super Heavyweight Champion
- Alyssa Manley (born 1994), American field hockey player
- Andrew Manley, American football quarterback
- Audrey F. Manley (born 1934), American pediatrician, acting Surgeon General of the United States from 1995 to 1997 and President of Spelman College
- Brian Manley (1929–2014), UK physicist and engineer
- Charlotte Manley (born 1957), former Royal Navy officer, now Chapter Clerk of St George's Chapel, Windsor
- David Manley (philosopher), American philosopher
- David Manley (artist), British artist, educationalist and arts administrator
- Delarivier Manley (1663 or c.1670–1724), English author, playwright and political pamphleteer
- Dex Manley, American commercial and video game voice actor
- Dexter Manley (born 1959), former American football player
- Don Manley (born 1945), British crossword compiler
- Dorothy Manley (1927–2021), British sprinter and Olympic silver medalist in the 100 metres
- Douglas Manley (1922-2013), Jamaican politician
- Edna Manley (1900–1987), Jamaican sculptor
- Effa Manley (1897–1981), American Negro league baseball owner and first woman inducted into the Baseball Hall of Fame; wife of Abe Manley
- Elizabeth Manley (born 1965), Canadian figure skater and Olympic and world silver medalist
- George Manley (born 1965), American voice artist, novelist and screenplay writer
- Ger Manley (born 1968), Irish former hurler
- Gordon Manley (1902–1980), English climatologist
- Graham Manley (born 1946), British comic artist
- James Manley (disambiguation)
- Jessica Manley (born 1985), British actress
- Jim Manley (disambiguation)
- Joe Manley (1959–2023), American boxer
- Joey Manley, American web comic publisher
- John Manley (disambiguation)
- Joseph Homan Manley (1842–1905), American politician
- Kerrie Manley (born 1982), English footballer
- Leon Manley (1926–2010), American football player and coach
- Luke Manley, American actor
- Malcolm Manley (born 1949), Scottish footballer
- Marion Manley (1893–1984), American architect
- Martin Manley (born 1952), former US Assistant Secretary of Labor, entrepreneur and founder of online bookseller Alibris
- Michael Manley (1924–1997), fourth Prime Minister of Jamaica
- Mike Manley (disambiguation)
- Natalie Manley, elected to the Illinois House of Representatives in 2012
- Norman Manley (1893–1969), Jamaican lawyer, politician and Chief Minister of Jamaica
- Peter Manley (born 1962), former professional darts player
- Peter Manley (politician) (1903–1998), Canadian politician
- Phillipkeith Manley (born 1990), American football player
- Rachel Manley, Jamaican writer
- Ray Manley (1921–2006), American photographer
- R.O.B. Manley (1888–1978), British beekeeper
- Rockcliffe St. J. Manley (1925–2011), Canadian polymer chemist
- Roddy Manley (born 1965), Scottish former football player
- Scott Manley (born 1972), Scottish YouTube personality, gamer, programmer, astrophysicist and DJ.
- Seon Manley (1921–2009), American editor
- Simon Manley (born 1967), British diplomat
- Stuart Manley (born 1979), Welsh professional golfer
- Suliana Manley (born 1975), American biophysicist
- Tadhg Manley (1893–1976), Irish politician
- Tom Manley (disambiguation)
- William Manley (1831–1901), Irish recipient of the Victoria Cross and Surgeon-General
