= Mandley =

Mandley is probably a form of surname Mandel (almond). It may also come from Manley. Notable people with the surname include:

- Jack Mandley (1909–1988), British footballer
- Pete Mandley (born 1961), American football player
