= Heather Dick =

Heather Dick may refer to:

- Heather M. Dick (1932-2007), Scottish microbiologist
- Heather Dick, character in film Torso: The Evelyn Dick Story
