= Manly =

Manly may refer to:

== Places ==
=== Australia ===
- Manly, New South Wales, a suburb of Sydney
  - Manly Council, a former local government area in Sydney
  - Electoral district of Manly, an electorate in the NSW State Government
  - Manly Beach, a beach
- Manly, Queensland, a suburb of Brisbane
  - Manly railway station
  - Electoral district of Manly (Queensland), an electoral district from 1986 to 1992

=== United States ===
- Manly, Iowa, a city
- Manly, North Carolina, an unincorporated community
- Lake Manly, a former rift lake in California, US

=== New Zealand ===
- Manly, New Zealand, a suburb on the Whangaparaoa Peninsula north of Auckland

== Sports ==
- Manly Warringah Sea Eagles, a team in the Australian National Rugby League
- Wynnum Manly Seagulls, a rugby league team in Brisbane, Australia
- Manly RUFC, a rugby union team in Manly, New South Wales, Australia

== Other uses ==
- Manly (name), a surname and a given name
- Mr. Manly, an American radio program
- Manly Daily, an Australian newspaper covering areas near Manly
- SS Manly, a steam ferry that operated on Sydney Harbour between 1896 and 1924
- MV Manly (1965), a hydrofoil ferry which operated on Sydney Harbour

== See also ==
- Manly Hospital, Sydney, Australia
- Little Boy from Manly, a national personification of New South Wales and later Australia
- Manley (disambiguation)
- Manliness (disambiguation)
