= Munnelly =

Munnelly is a surname of Irish origin, primarily derived from the Gaelic Ó Maonghaile sept located in County Mayo. Variants include Manley, Munley, Mandley, Manly, Mandly, Monnelly, and Monley.

Individuals with the name include:

- Jarlath Munnelly, husband of Lisa Chambers
- John P. Munnelly (1918–1989), American politician from Nebraska
- Martin Munnelly (born 1969), American former professional soccer midfielder, high school teacher, and youth coach
- Michael Munnelly (1941-1964), Irish journalist
- Ross Munnelly (born 1982), Irish former Gaelic footballer
- Tom Munnelly (1944-2007), Irish folklorist and collector of traditional songs
