= Aywick =

Coordinates: 60.563°N 1.032°W

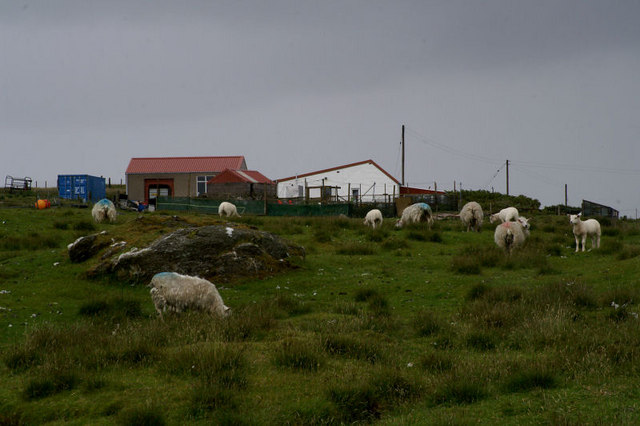
- House in North Aywick

- Location within Shetland
- OS grid reference: HU530869
- Civil parish: Yell
- Council area: Shetland
- Lieutenancy area: Shetland
- Country: Scotland
- Sovereign state: United Kingdom
- Post town: SHETLAND
- Postcode district: ZE2
- Dialling code: 01957
- Police: Scotland
- Fire: Scottish
- Ambulance: Scottish
- UK Parliament: Orkney and Shetland
- Scottish Parliament: Shetland

Aywick (Shaetlan pronunciation: [e:wik] AY-week) is a small settlement on the east side of Yell, an island forming part of the Shetland Islands north of Scotland.

The naturalist Bobby Tulloch was born and grew up in Aywick.
