= Manly (name) =

Manly is both a surname and a given name. Notable people with the name include:

Surname:

- Manly (surname)

Given name:

- Manly Barton (born 1949), American politician
- Manly Palmer Hall (1901–1990), Canadian author and mystic
- Manly Miles (1826–1898), American zoologist and agriculturalist
- Manly Wade Wellman (1903–1986), American writer
