= Manliness (disambiguation) =

Manliness is a set of attributes, behaviors and roles generally associated with boys and men.

Manliness may also refer to:

- Manliness (book), a book by Harvey Mansfield

== See also ==
- Manly (disambiguation)
