= James Manley =

James or Jim Manley may refer to:

- James Manley (American football) (born 1974), American football defensive tackle
- James L. Manley (born 1949), professor of life sciences
- James R. Manley (1782–1851), American physician and professor of obstetrics
- James Manley (wrestler) (born 1958), American professional wrestler, better known by the ring name Jim Powers
- Jim Manley (artist) (born 1934), British artist
- Jim Manley (songwriter) (born 1940), American songwriter and composer of hymns
- Jim Manley (strategist), American political strategist

== See also ==
- James Manly (born 1932), Canadian politician
- James Manly, sergeant in 3d Armored Cavalry Regiment during Mexican-American War
