= Manley (given name) =

Manley is the given name of:

- M. Caldwell Butler (1925–2014), U.S. Representative from Virginia
- Manley Sonny Carter (1947-1991), American physician, professional soccer player, United States Navy officer, and NASA astronaut
- Manley Dixon (1760?-1837), British admiral
- Manley Justin Edwards (1892-1962), Canadian barrister, teacher and politician
- Manley Ottmer Hudson (1886-1960), American lawyer and judge at the Permanent Court of International Justice
- Manley Angell James (1896-1975), British general and recipient of the Victoria Cross
- Manley Kemp (1861–1951), British schoolmaster and cricketer
- Manley Power (1773-1826), British lieutenant general and Lieutenant Governor of Malta
- Laurence Eliot Power, British admiral and grandson of the above
- Manley Laurence Power (1904-1981), British admiral and son of the above
