= Jim Manley (songwriter) =

American songwriter

James Keith Manley (born 1940) is an American songwriter and composer of hymns, as well as pastor in the United Church of Christ. Manley is best known for his 1975 hymn Spirit (also known as Spirit, Spirit of Gentleness), included in the modern Presbyterian Hymnal as number 319 and in the United Church of Christ's New Century Hymnal as number 286

Born in Holyoke, Massachusetts, Manley was raised in Reno, Nevada, where his father, the Rev. Felix A. Manley, was pastor of the Federated Church of Reno, a Presbyterian-Congregational church (named First Congregational Church as of 2024). Manley attended Whittier College and Pacific School of Religion, and received his Doctor of Ministry from Claremont College in 1976. From 1968 to 1978, he was chaplain at Mid-Pacific Institute in Honolulu, Hawaii. He served as pastor of UCC congregations in Fremont, California (1966–1968), San Marino, California (1978 to 1988), and Los Altos, California (1988 until his retirement in 1999).

A tribute concert to showcase some of his music was held on March 15, 2025, and he performed many of his own works while inviting some of his friends to perform others.
