= Mike Turner (cricketer) =

English cricketer (1934–2015)

Mike Turner

Francis Michael Turner MBE (8 August 1934 – 21 July 2015) was an English cricketer active from 1954 to 1959 who played for Leicestershire. He appeared in ten first-class matches as a right-handed batsman who bowled leg break and googly. He scored 196 runs with a highest score of 28* and took three wickets with a best performance of three for 56. Turner remained in cricket and worked for Leicestershire in administration. The club awarded him a benefit season in 1985. In 1994 he was awarded the MBE for services to cricket.
