= Cathy Manly =

Burkinabé writer (born 1973)

Cathérine Marie Téwendé Manly Loagboko (born 15 June 1973), known as Cathy Manly, is a Burkinabé writer.

She co-authored a 2023 comic book Le matin du bonheur which was produced in association with the 17th Ougadougou international book fair, with the support of the Fonds de développement culturel et Touristique (FDCT).

Her 2024 Une victime innocente is a collection of seven short stories reflecting on parents' responsibilities to their children.

== Awards and honours ==
In 2023 she was appointed a Chevalier de l'Ordre du Mérite des Arts, des Lettres et de la Culture.

== Selected publications ==
- Le Matin du bonheur. Timiniyis. 2023. ISBN 978-2-9581317-8-4.
- Manly, Cathy (2024). Une victime innocentre. Editions Hector-Adams. ISBN 979-10-95955-68-9.
