= Tom Manley =

Tom or Thomas Manley may refer to:

- Tom Manley (college president), President of Antioch College as of 2016
- Tom Manley (footballer) (1912–1988), English footballer
