= John Manley (disambiguation) =

John Manley (born 1950) is a Canadian politician.

John Manley may also refer to:

- John Manley (MP) (1622–1699), English soldier, MP and Postmaster General
- John Manley (archaeologist) (born 1950), British archaeologist
- John Henry Manley (1907–1990), American nuclear physicist
- John Manley (naval officer) (1733–1793), United States Navy officer
- John Manley (1655–1713), 17th- and 18th-century English politician
