= Bobby Tulloch =

Scottish naturalist (1929–1996)

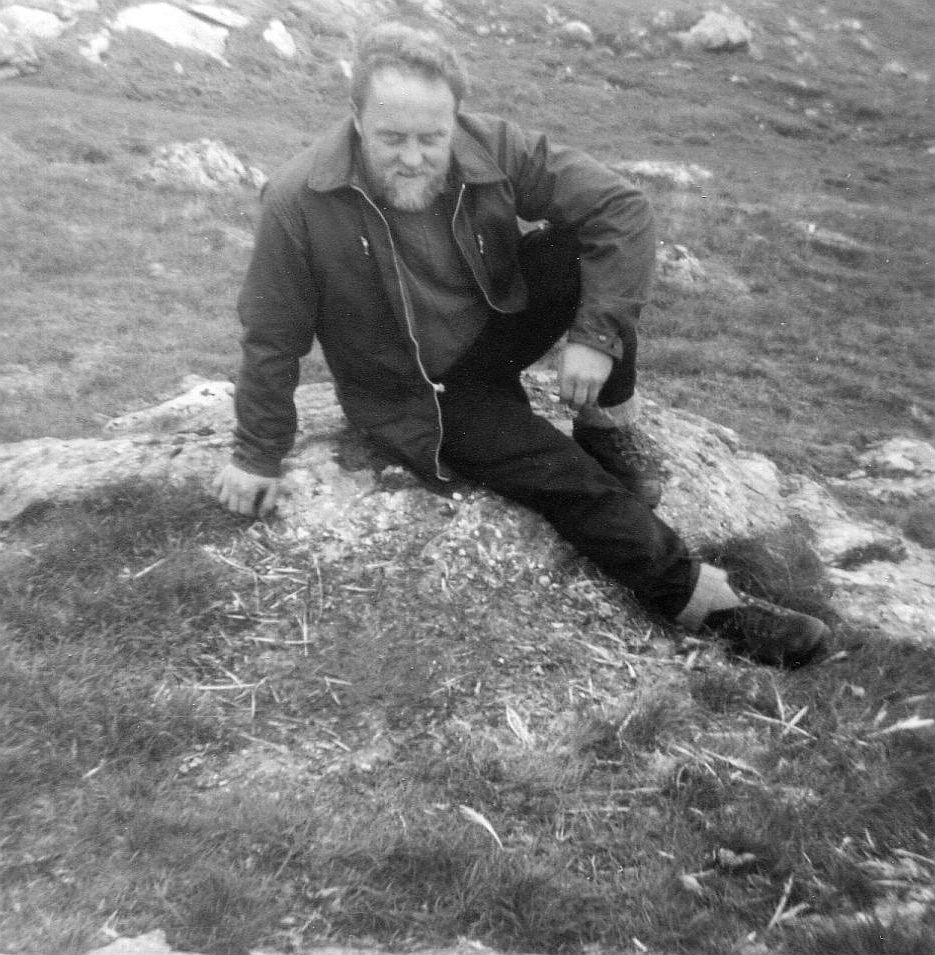
- Bobby Tulloch at the site of the snowy owl nest on the island of Fetlar, Shetland, 1967
- Born: Robert John Tulloch; 4 January 1929; Aywick, Yell, Shetland, Scotland
- Died: 21 May 1996 (aged 67); Shetland, Scotland
- Other names: "Tucker" (nickname)
- Occupations: Naturalist and writer
- Known for: RSPB warden in Shetland; discovering nesting snowy owls in Shetland in 1967
- Notable work: Bobby Tulloch's Shetland: An islander, his islands and their wildlife (1988)

Robert "Bobby" John Tulloch MBE (4 January 1929 – 21 May 1996) was a naturalist from Shetland in the north of Scotland.

Bobby Tulloch was born on a croft at Aywick on the eastern side of Yell, as the oldest of four children, and lived much of his life in the village of Mid Yell. He served national service in the United Kingdom and Hong Kong.

Tulloch started as an apprentice baker with his brother-in-law and remained in the trade until 1964, when after meeting George Waterston of the Royal Society for the Protection of Birds (RSPB), he was appointed as RSPB warden in Shetland. He was especially associated with the snowy owls that started breeding on the island of Fetlar in 1967. He featured in a number of BBC Natural History Unit programmes, including a personal recounting of his discovery of the snow owls nesting on Fetlar, originally broadcast in 1974 on the BBC Radio 4 programme The Living World and rebroadcast by Lindsey Chapman in 2019.

Bobby Tulloch was an artist, boatman, musician, naturalist, photographer, storyteller and writer. In 1994, he was awarded an MBE. He was nicknamed "Tucker" by his friends. He has been described as one of Shetland's "greatest-ever ambassadors". A book of reminiscences about Bobby Tulloch, Bobby the Birdman, was published in 2016.

== Selected books ==
- Bobby Tulloch and Fred Hunter, Guide to Shetland Birds. The Shetland Times, 1979. ISBN 0-900662-22-0. Paperback.
- Bobby Tulloch, Bobby Tulloch's Shetland: An islander, his islands and their wildlife. Macmillan, 1988. ISBN 0-333-45673-4. Hardcover. (Introduction by Lord Grimond.)
- Bobby Tulloch, Migrations: Travels of a Naturalist. Kyle Cathie, 1991. ISBN 1-85626-016-X. Hardcover.
- Bobby Tulloch, Otters. Worldlife Library S., Colin Baxter Photography, 1994/1999. ISBN 1-84107-009-2. Paperback.
