= Manish =

- Gender: Masculine

Origin
- Origin: Hindu
- Meaning: "The God of the mind" or the one who has controlled and mastered one's mind

Manish (also Maneesh) (Devanagari: मनिष or मनीष) is a common Hindu masculine given name that literally means "The God of the Mind" or the one who has controlled and mastered one's mind (representing an intellectual, genius, etc.), derived from the Sanskrit words "man" (mann) which means Mind and "ish" which refers to God or master. Many Hindu male children are given this name. It is a popular name in India and Nepal.

== Notable persons with this given name ==
- Maneesh Agrawala (born 1973), American computer scientist
- Maneesh Sharma, Indian film director
- Manish Acharya (1967–2010), Indian film director and actor
- Manish Arora, Indian fashion designer
- Manish Bhasin, British sports journalist
- Manish Bhargav (born 1994), Indian footballer
- Manish Dayal, American actor
- Manish Ghatak (1902–1979), Indian poet and novelist
- Manish Gupta (director), Indian writer and director
- Manish Gupta (politician), Indian politician
- Manish Jha (director) (born 1978), Indian film director and screenwriter
- Manish Joshi Bismil, Indian theatre director
- Manish Kaushik (voice actor) (born 1980), Indian voice-dubbing artist
- Manish Maithani (born 1987), Indian football player
- Manish Makhija (born 1968), Indian VJ and restaurateur
- Manish Malhotra (born 1965), Indian fashion Designer
- Manish Paul (born 1978), Indian actor
- Manish Pandey (born 1989), Indian cricketer
- Manish Pitambare (1975–2006), Indian soldier
- Manish Raisinghani (born 1979), Indian actor and model
- Manish Sharma (cricketer) (born 1981), Indian cricketer
- Manish Sisodia (born 1972), Indian social activist
- Manish Tewari, Indian politician
- Manish Vatsalya (born 1980), Indian actor and filmmaker

== See also ==
- Personal name
- Given name
- Indian name
- List of most popular given names
