= Robert Evans (businessman) =

British businessman (1927–2020)

Sir Robert Evans (28 May 1927 – 24 July 2020) was a British businessman, and the chairman of British Gas plc from 1989 to 1993.

Robert Evans was born in Liverpool on 28 May 1927, the son of Florence and Gwilym Evans. At Knotty Ash Primary School, he became friends with Ken Dodd.

Evans worked for British Gas for almost his entire career, rising to chief executive, and chairman from 1989 to 1993.
