= Heather M. Dick =

Scottish microbiologist (1932–2007)

Heather May Dick CBE FRSE FRCP FRCPath
- Born: Heather May Mitchell; November 1932
- Died: 2007
- Education: University of St Andrews (MB ChB, 1957); University of Dundee (MD, 1981)
- Known for: Tissue typing
- Spouse: A. L. Dick (m. 1958)
- Children: 1
- Awards: CBE (1994); FRSE (1985)
- Scientific career
- Fields: Medical microbiology, clinical immunology
- Workplaces: University of Dundee; University of Glasgow; Glasgow Royal Infirmary

Heather May Dick (November 1932 - 2007; née Mitchell) was a Scottish microbiologist.

== Early life and education ==
Heather May Mitchell was born in November 1932 and was "a native of Dundee". She was educated at the Harris Academy, and studied medicine at the University of St Andrews School of Medicine, gaining her MB, ChB in 1957. She then gained an MD from the University of Dundee in 1981, her FRCP in 1981, and FRCPath in 1983. She changed her surname to Dick on her marriage in 1958.

== Career ==
After graduating, Dick worked at Dundee Royal Infirmary and the Ruchill Hospital, Glasgow, before taking up a post as an assistant in the Department of Bacteriology of the then Queen's College, Dundee (later the University of Dundee) from 1959 to 1961. She took a career break when her daughter was born, and then worked in virology at the Belvidere Hospital, Glasgow for 6 months in 1964 before being appointed as a lecturer in the department of bacteriology at the University of Glasgow. In 1971 she was appointed consultant in clinical immunology at Glasgow Royal Infirmary.

She became professor of medical microbiology and head of the department of microbiology at Dundee University, being appointed to the chair in 1984 and giving her inaugural lecture in October 1985. In 1994 she was chair of the Advisory committee on the microbiological safety of food.

She was a director of SoftMed Ltd from 1989 to 1991 and of the Scottish Crop Research Institute from 1992 to 1998.

== Recognition ==
She was elected a Fellow of The Royal Society of Edinburgh (FRSE) in 1985.

In 1990 she was elected a vice-president of the Royal College of Pathologists for a three-year term.

She was appointed Commander of the Order of the British Empire (CBE) in the 1994 Birthday Honours, "For services to Medicine and to Food Safety."

== Personal life ==
She married A. L. Dick in May 1958, and had a daughter. She died in 2007.

== Selected publications ==
- Dick, Heather M.; Dawson, Christine O.; Campbell, J. D. (1973). "Farmers lung: a comparison of simple diagnostic techniques and antigen preparation in human and bovine disease". Clinical Allergy. 3: 209–216.
- Dick, Heather M.; Crichton, W. Barry (1972). Tissue typing techniques. Edinburgh: Churchill Livingstone. ISBN 0443009244.
- Dick, Heather M.; Kissmeyer-Nielsen, Flemming (1979). Histocompatibility techniques. Amsterdam ; New York : New York: Elsevier/North-Holland Biomedical Press ; sole distributors for the USA and Canada, Elsevier North-Holland. ISBN 0444801324.
- Topley, W. W. C. (1984). Wilson, Graham; Dick, Heather M. (eds.). Topley and Wilson's Principles of bacteriology, virology and immunity. Vol. 1. Introduction to microbiology and immunity (7th ed.). London: Arnold. ISBN 0713144246.
- McGee, James O'D.; Isaacson, Peter G.; Wright, Nicholas A.; Dick, Heather M.; Slack, Mary P. E., eds. (1992). Oxford textbook of pathology. Oxford ; New York: Oxford University Press. ISBN 0192619756.
