= Brian Manley =

British physicist and engineer

Brian Manley CBE FREng FInstP FIEE FCGI

Managing Partner, Manley Moon Associates
- In office 1988–2001

Personal details
- Born: Brian William Manley; 30 June 1929
- Died: 20 December 2014 (aged 85)
- Occupation: Electrical engineer, physicist

Brian William Manley (30 June 1929 – 20 December 2014) was a British physicist and engineer. He served as president of the Institution of Electrical Engineers in 1991 and was president of the Institute of Physics from 1996-1998.
