= James McElnay =

Professor James McElnay OBE, FRPharmS FCCP
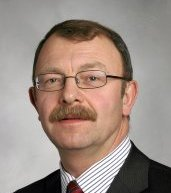

Acting President and Vice-Chancellor of Queen's University Belfast
- In office 16 June 2017 – January 2018
- Preceded by: Patrick G. Johnston
- Succeeded by: Ian Greer

Pro-Vice-Chancellor for Research, Enterprise and Postgraduate Affairs of Queen's University Belfast
- Incumbent
- Assumed office 1 July 2008

Personal details
- Born: 14 December 1954 (age 71) Ballymoney, Northern Ireland
- Spouse: Diana Marie Haughey
- Children: 3
- Education: Queen's University Belfast; University of Iowa; Texas Medical Centre
- Profession: Pharmacist; Academic
- Website: Prof. James McElnay

James Charles McElnay OBE FCCP FRPharmS is the current Pro-Vice-Chancellor for Research, Enterprise and Postgraduate Affairs and the Acting President and Vice-Chancellor of Queen's University Belfast. He was elected as acting Vice-Chancellor at a meeting of the standing committee of the university following the death of President and Vice-Chancellor Prof. Patrick Johnston. McElnay previously served as acting president and Vice-Chancellor in 2013 before the appointment of Prof. Johnston.

== Background ==
McElnay earned his BSc and PhD from Queen's University Belfast and, after registration as a qualified pharmacist, he spent a year at the University of Iowa on a postdoctoral fellowship.

He continued his academic career at Queen's and spent a year as a visiting professor at the Texas Medical Centre in Houston before being awarded a Chair of Pharmacy Practice in 1995. At Queen's, he was Head of the School of Pharmacy from 1994 to 2001 and Dean of the Faculty of Science and Agriculture from 2001 to 2005.

McElnay is a Fellow of the American College of Clinical Pharmacy, of the Royal Pharmaceutical Society of Great Britain and the Pharmaceutical Society of Northern Ireland.

His research interests lie in the area of clinical pharmacy, with particular reference to pharmaceutical care and paediatric therapy.

He was appointed an Officer of the Order of the British Empire (OBE) in the 2019 New Year Honours for services to Higher Education and Pharmacy.
