= List of vice-chancellors of the Queen's University Belfast =

The president and vice-chancellor of Queen's University Belfast is the executive head of the university.

- 1908–1923: Rev. Thomas Hamilton
- 1924–1933: Sir Richard Livingstone
- 1934–1938: Sir Frederick Ogilvie
- 1939–1949: Sir David Keir
- 1950–1959: Eric Ashby, Baron Ashby
- 1959–1966: Michael Grant
- 1966–1976: Sir Arthur Vick
- 1976–1986: Sir Peter Froggatt
- 1986–1997: Sir Gordon Beveridge
- 1998–2004: Sir George Bain
- 2004–2013: Sir Peter Gregson
- 2014–2017: Patrick Johnston
- 2017–2018: James McElnay
- 2018–: Sir Ian Greer

== See also ==
- List of chancellors of Queen's University Belfast
