= Cumann Gaelach =

Type of student society in Ireland

An Cumann Gaelach (English: "Irish Language Society") is a type of student society found in many colleges and universities in Ireland. Several of these societies were founded in the early 1900s as part of a wider revival of the Irish-language, which saw the establishment of national groups such as Conradh na Gaeilge (English: Gaelic League).

Although the societies are not formally linked, they operate in a similar manner through the facilitating of Irish classes (often free), céilís and trips to the Gaeltacht (Irish speaking areas), while many hold events in March during Seachtain na Gaeilge (English: Irish Language Week).

Some societies also take part in the annual Glór na nGael (English: Voice of the Gael) competition, which gives awards to third-level groups for their work in the promotion of the Irish language. Coordinated by Foras na Gaeilge, the competition includes a specific category (Comórtas na gCumann Gaelacha) for colleges and universities. The University of Glasgow's Cumann Gaelach Ollscoil Ghlaschú was founded in 2016.

== Membership ==
An annual survey of the country’s main Cumainn Ghaelacha (plural form) and their membership was published from 2003 until 2008 by the Irish language daily newspaper, Lá Nua, until the newspaper's demise. The 2007 edition featured a total of eleven groups, with An Cumann Gaelach, TCD (Trinity College Dublin) listed as the largest in the state, and An Cumann Gaelach, QUB (Queen's University Belfast) the largest in Northern Ireland, and An Chuallacht, UCC (University College Cork) among the largest in Munster.

University	2003-04	2004-05	2005-06	2006-07	2007-08
Dublin City University	-	50	140	160	149
Dublin Institute of Technology	-	30	31	132	188
NUI Galway	-	-	-	360	155
NUI Maynooth	30	60	70	150	122
Queen's University Belfast	25	46	85	88	168
St Mary's University College	-	-	-	-	30
Trinity College, Dublin	330	520	525	700	1,060
University College Cork	-	600	400	520	950
University College Dublin	-	230	370	312	812
University of Limerick	-	-	74	110	100
University of Ulster, Coleraine	-	-	60	60	50
Total	385	1,536	1,755	2,592	3,784
