= Gordon Beveridge =

Scottish chemist

Sir Gordon Beveridge
- Born: 28 November 1933; St Andrews, Fife, Scotland
- Died: 28 August 1999 (aged 65); Belfast, Northern Ireland
- Education: Inverness Royal Academy, University of Glasgow, University of Edinburgh
- Occupation: chemist
- Known for: founder member of the Engineering Council
- Notable work: Optimization: Theory and Practice, Engineering in the 80s exhibition
- Spouse: Geertruida Hillegonda Johanna Bruijn (m. 1963)
- Parents: Victor Beattie Beveridge (father); Elizabeth (Fairbairn) Grieve (mother)

Sir Gordon Smith Grieve Beveridge (28 November 1933 – 28 August 1999) was a Scottish chemical engineer. He served as president and vice-chancellor of Queen's University of Belfast, Northern Ireland, from 1986 to 1997. He was knighted in 1994 for his services to higher education and died in Belfast.

== Career ==
Sir Gordon was born in St Andrews, Fife and brought up in Inverness. He attended Inverness Royal Academy, followed by the University of Glasgow, where he studied engineering. He had a distinguished career and completed his PhD at the University of Edinburgh. He spent some time at the University of Minnesota as a Harkness Fellow. He was also a visiting professor at the University of Texas. In 1967, he moved to Heriot-Watt University in Edinburgh, and, from 1971 to 1986, was a professor of chemical engineering and head of the Department of Chemical and Process Engineering at the University of Strathclyde in Glasgow.

Among his many posts, he was a Fellow and an Officer of the Royal Academy of Engineering, a Fellow of the Royal Society of Edinburgh, a Fellow of the Royal Society of Arts, a member of the Royal Irish Academy and a Companion of the Institute of Management.

In 1981, he was a founder member of the Engineering Council. He served 13 years first as chairman of its Standing Committee on Professional Institutions and later as chairman of its standing committee on the Regions and Assembly. He was also a member of the National Economic Development Office (Nedo) Chemicals Economic Development Committee and chairman of its Petrochemical Sector Working Group.

In 1984, he served a term as president of the Institution of Chemical Engineers. He was President of QUA in 1989. He was chairman of the Government's Radioactive Waste Management Advisory Committee (RWMAC) 1995-98, a member of the board of the Northern Ireland Growth Challenge and a director of University Bookshop Ltd, the Northern Quality Centre and the Northern Ireland Economic Research Centre.

He also served as a member of the council of the Open University, as director and chairman of Navan at Armagh Management Ltd, which runs the Navan Fort complex; Textflow Services Ltd, QUBIS Ltd (1991–97) and Lennoxvale Developments Ltd.

He was also a director of NI Opera.

== Family ==
Gordon was the son of Victor Beattie Beveridge and Elizabeth (Fairbairn) Grieve. He married Geertruida Hillegonda Johanna Bruijn in 1963.

== Publications ==
He wrote more than 300 articles, papers and books, including Optimization: Theory and Practice (with Robert S. Schechter, published by McGraw-Hill Book Company Inc. New York, 1970).

== Exhibitions ==
- Engineering in the 80s, Edinburgh. Targeted at school leavers who were considering one of the branches of engineering as a career, this exhibition for the Council of Engineering Institutions was held at the Royal Museum of Scotland for three months. Exhibits ranged from coalface-cutting machines to needles for optical surgery.
Engineering in the 80s Exhibition

== Honorary degrees ==
- University of Dublin, Ireland
- Connecticut College, USA
- 1995 Lodz University of Technology, Poland
- Royal Irish Academy, Ireland
- 1985 University of Ulster, Northern Ireland
- 1994 DSc Queen's University of Kingston, Canada
- 1995 Dsc Queens University of Kingston, Canada
- 1995 LLD University of Ireland
- 1995 LLD University of Limerick
- 1997/98 DUniv Heriot-Watt University, Edinburgh
- 1998 LLD Queen's University of Belfast, Belfast

Academic offices
Preceded by Sir Peter Froggatt	President and Vice-Chancellor of Queen's University Belfast; 1986–1997	Succeeded by Professor Sir George Bain
