= George Bain (academic) =

British-Canadian academic

Professor Sir George Bain
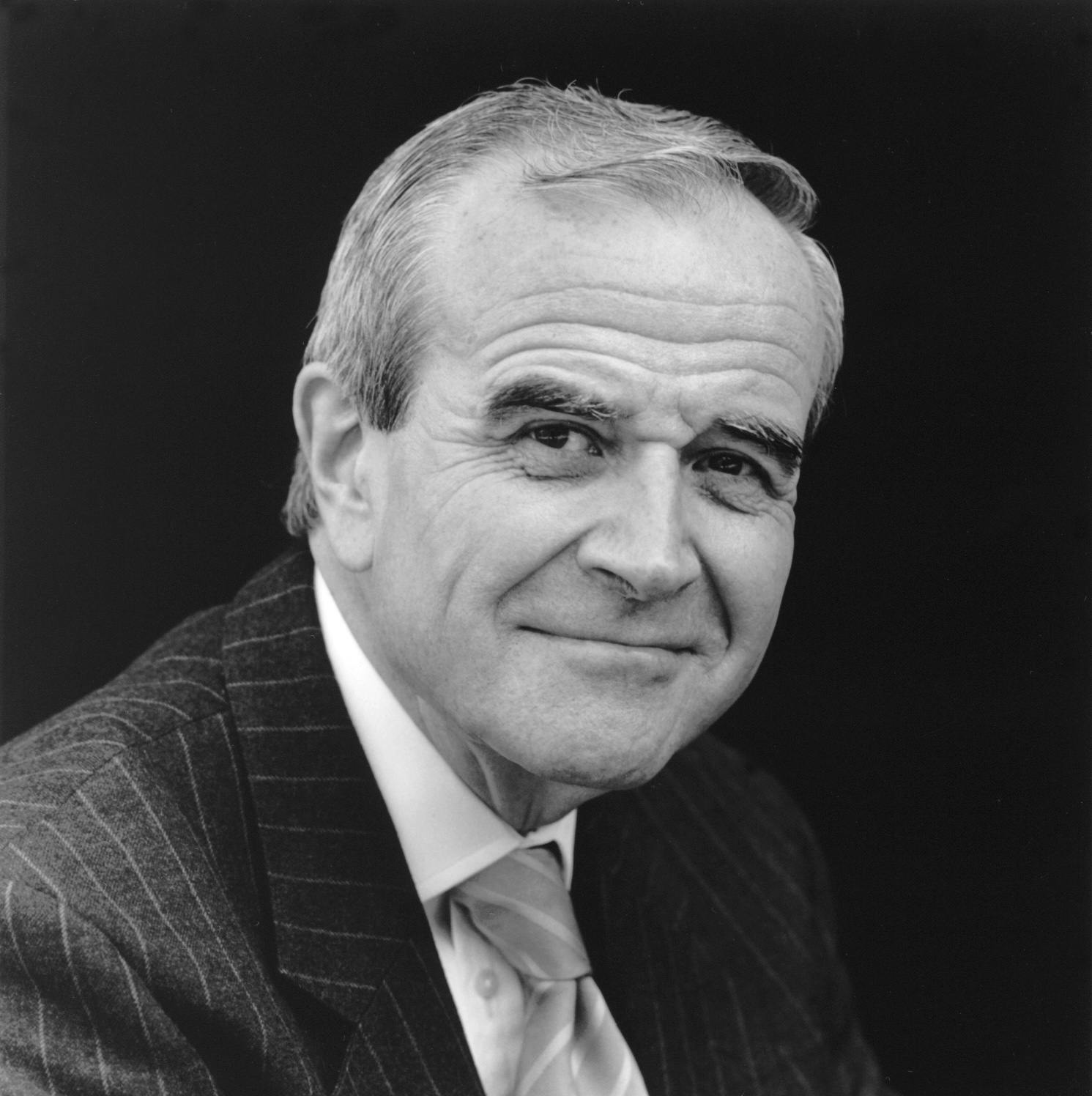

10th President and Vice-Chancellor of Queen's University Belfast
- In office 1998–2004
- Chancellor: David Orr; George J. Mitchell
- Preceded by: Gordon Beveridge
- Succeeded by: Peter Gregson

1st Chair of the Low Pay Commission
- In office 2008–2009 (interim)
- Minister: Peter Mandelson
- Preceded by: Paul Myners
- Succeeded by: David Norgrove
- In office 1997–2002
- Minister: Margaret Beckett; Peter Mandelson; Stephen Byers; Patricia Hewitt
- Preceded by: New office
- Succeeded by: Adair Turner

Principal of London Business School
- In office 1989–1997
- Preceded by: Peter G. Moore
- Succeeded by: John Quelch

Chairman of Warwick Business School
- In office 1983–1989
- Preceded by: Thom Watson
- Succeeded by: Robin Wensley

President of the Manitoba New Democratic Party
- In office 1962–1963

Personal details
- Born: George Sayers Bain; 24 February 1939 (age 87) Winnipeg, Manitoba, Canada
- Citizenship: Canadian; British
- Education: University of Manitoba; Nuffield College, Oxford

Military service
- Branch/service: Royal Canadian Naval Reserve
- Years of service: 1957–1963
- Rank: Lieutenant

Sir George Sayers Bain (born 24 February 1939) is a Canadian-British academic and public commissioner. His academic research focuses on industrial relations, and he has also served as president and Vice-Chancellor of Queen's University Belfast (1998–2004), principal of the London Business School (1989–97), and chair of Warwick Business School (1983–89). He served as a commissioner on many public inquiries, including chairing the United Kingdom's Low Pay Commission (1997–2002; 2008–09), which introduced the National Minimum Wage in 1999, and the Northern Ireland Memorial Fund (1998–2002), an organisation offering support to victims of the Troubles.

== Early life ==
George Bain was born in Winnipeg, Manitoba, on 24 February 1939, the son of George Alexander Bain, a skilled manual worker at the Canadian Pacific Railway, and Margaret Ioleen Bain (née Bamford).

After attending state schools in Winnipeg, he entered the University of Manitoba in 1956, studying economics and political science, and graduated with a BA (Hons) in 1961 and an MA in 1964. A Commonwealth Scholarship took him to Pembroke College, Oxford in 1963 and to Nuffield College in 1964, where he studied industrial relations and obtained a DPhil in 1968.

While at the University of Manitoba, he joined the Royal Canadian Naval Reserve as an officer cadet, and served in various ships and establishments over a six-year period, retiring with the rank of Lieutenant in 1963.

He was also a member of the New Democratic Party and its predecessor, the Co-operative Commonwealth Federation, and was President of the Manitoba NDP in 1962–63.

== Career ==
=== Academic ===
Bain was a lecturer in economics at the University of Manitoba in 1962–63. He was a Research Fellow at Nuffield College, Oxford in 1966-69 and the Frank Thomas Professor of Industrial Relations at the University of Manchester Institute of Science and Technology in 1969–70. He gave up his chair to become the deputy director of the Economic & Social Research Council's Industrial Relations Research Unit at the University of Warwick, and became Director in 1974, holding the post until 1981. The unit was one of the first attempts in the UK to bring together a large group of social scientists to undertake full-time collaborative research. In 1979, he was appointed as the Pressed Steel Fisher Chair of Industrial Relations at the University of Warwick.

His research has mainly focused on: white-collar employees and their organisations; the theory of union growth; public policy relating to union recognition and union security, collective bargaining, employee participation and industrial democracy; and the bibliography of industrial relations. He has been the author or co-author of nine books and monographs and 40 papers in academic journals.

He was chairman of Warwick Business School from 1983 to 1989, principal of the London Business School (1989–97), and President and Vice Chancellor of Queen's University Belfast (1998–2004).

He has also served in several academic professional associations, including:

- council member, Economic & Social Research Council, 1986–91
- chair, Council of University Management Schools, 1987–90
- vice president, European Foundation for Management Development, 1991–95
- member, Board of Directors, American Assembly of Collegiate Schools of Business, 1992–94
- board member, Foundation for Canadian Studies in the UK, 1993–2001, 2004–06
- chairman, Association of Commonwealth Universities, 2002–03
- trustee, Council for Advancement & Support of Education, 2004–08, and CASE Europe, 2004–07

=== Public service ===
Under the auspices of the Advisory Conciliation and Arbitration Service (ACAS) and in a private capacity between 1972 and 1992, he conducted 71 arbitrations and mediations between unions and employers in virtually every sector of the UK economy.

He has been a member and the chairman of several commissions of inquiry, including:

- Member, Committee of Inquiry on Industrial Democracy (Bullock Committee), Department of Trade, 1975–76.
- Member, Senior Salaries Review Body, Department of Trade & Industry, 1993–96, which provides independent advice to the government on the pay of senior civil servants, senior officers of the armed forces, and the judiciary.
- Chairman, Commission on Public Policy and British Business, Institute for Public Policy Research, 1995–97, which investigated the competitive position of the UK economy and the role that public policy should play in improving it.
- Chairman, Low Pay Commission, Department of Trade & Industry, 1997-2002 and 2008–09, which introduced the National Minimum Wage in 1999. In 2010, the Institute for Government, following a survey of the members of the Political Studies Association, named the National Minimum Wage the most successful public policy in the UK of the past thirty years.
- Chairman, Northern Ireland Memorial Fund, 1998–2002, an organisation offering support to victims of the Troubles.
- Chairman, Work and Parents Taskforce, Department of Trade & Industry, 2001, which underpinned legislation on work-life balance and flexible working.
- Chairman, Independent Review of the Fire Service, Office of the Deputy Prime Minister, 2002, which provided the basis for fundamental reform in this service.
- Chairman, Legal Services Review Group, Department of Finance & Personnel, Northern Ireland, 2005–06, which set out a new framework for regulating solicitors and barristers.
- Chairman, Independent Strategic Review of Education, Department of Education, Northern Ireland, 2006, which put forward a new approach for the strategic planning and organisation of the schools’ estate.
- Chairman, Independent Review of Policy on the Location of Public Sector Jobs, Department of Finance & Personnel, Northern Ireland, 2013–14, which advanced proposals for relocating public jobs from Belfast to other areas within Northern Ireland.
- Chairman, Commission on Future of National Minimum Wage and Low Pay Commission, Resolution Foundation, 2013–14. It recommended, among other things, that the government's economic policy should include an explicit long-term goal to reduce the incidence of low pay and set out a plan to reduce the percentage of employees who earn below two-thirds of the hourly median wage, which Chancellor George Osborne accepted in his summer budget of 2015.

=== Non-executive directorships ===
He has been a non-executive director of several companies in the UK and Canada, including Blackwell Publishers Ltd, 1990–97; The Economist Group, 1992–2001; Canada Life Assurance Company, 1996–2003; Bombardier Aerospace Shorts Brothers Plc, 1998–2007; Electra Private Equity Plc, 1998–2008; Entertainment One, 2007–10; Great-West Lifeco Inc., 2009–14; Canada Life Capital Corporation, 2003–14; and Canada Life Group (UK) Ltd, 1994–2014.

== Personal life ==
He married Carol Lynne Ogden White in 1962; they divorced in 1987. He married Gwynneth Rigby (née Vickers) in 1988; he has a daughter (Katherine) and a son (David) from his first marriage.

He is a keen genealogist and family historian. He has privately published histories of nine families from which he is descended – three in Northern Ireland and six in Scotland – generally tracing them back to the middle of the eighteenth century.

== Awards and honours ==
Honours received by Bain during his career include:

- Companion, Institute of Management (1991).
- Fellow: Royal Society of Arts (1987), British Academy of Management (1994), London Business School (1999), Academy of Social Sciences (2000); Association of Business Schools (2007).
- Honorary Fellow: Nuffield College, Oxford (2002).
- Honorary Doctor of Business Administration: De Montfort University (1994).
- Honorary LLD: National University of Ireland (1998), University of Guelph (1999), University College of Cape Breton (1999), University of Manitoba (2003), University of Warwick (2003), Queen's University (Canada, 2004), Queen's University Belfast (2005), University of Winnipeg (2016).
- Honorary Doctor of Letters: University of Ulster (2002), University of New Brunswick (2003).
- Honorary Doctor of Science: Cranfield University (2005).
- Knight Bachelor (2001).
- Council for Advancement and Support of Education (CASE): Chief Executive Leadership Award, 2003.
- Canadian High Commissioner's Award for outstanding contribution to the special relationship between Canada and the United Kingdom, 2003.
- British Academy of Management: Richard Whipp Life-time Achievement Award, 2014.
