= INTO Queen's University Belfast =

- Company type: Private
- Industry: Education
- Website: http://www.into.uk.com/qub/index.php

INTO Queen's University Belfast is a joint-venture study centre between Queen's University Belfast and INTO University Partnerships.

== See also ==
- Business-education partnerships
- Graduate Diploma, an academic pre - masters course to prepare international students for postgraduate study at UK universities
