= Peter Gregson (engineer) =

British research engineer and academic (1957–2024)

Sir Peter Gregson FREng
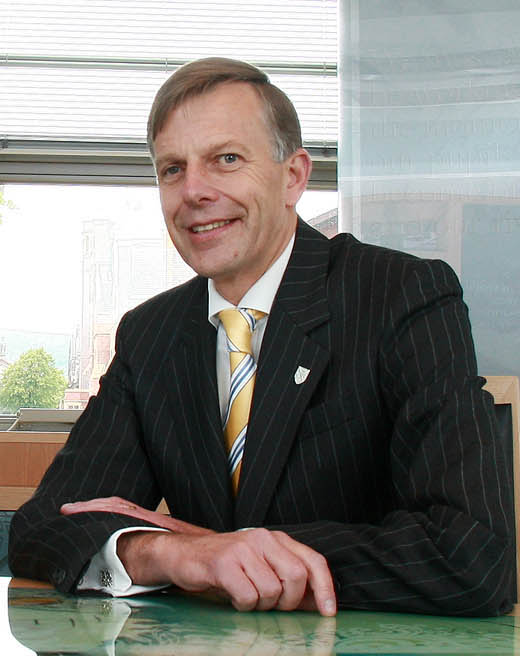
- Gregson in 2011

Chair of the Henry Royce Institute
- In office December 2021 – 23 February 2024

President and Vice-Chancellor of the Queen's University Belfast
- In office 2004–2013
- Preceded by: Sir George Bain
- Succeeded by: Prof. Patrick Johnston

Chief Executive and Vice-Chancellor of Cranfield University
- In office 2013–2021
- Preceded by: Clifford Michael Friend
- Succeeded by: Karen Holford

Personal details
- Born: 3 November 1957 Dunfermline, Scotland
- Died: 23 February 2024 (aged 66)
- Spouse: Rachael McClaughry (m. 1983)
- Children: 3
- Education: Imperial College London
- Profession: Academic; Engineer

Sir Peter John Gregson, FREng (3 November 1957 – 23 February 2024) was a British research engineer and chair of the Henry Royce Institute. He was previously the vice-chancellor of Cranfield University from 2013 to 2021 and president and vice-chancellor of Queen's University Belfast from 2004. Prior to that he was deputy vice-chancellor at the University of Southampton from 2000 to 2004.

== Early life ==
Gregson joined GKN Rolled and Bright Steel Ltd. as an industrial scholar in 1976. He studied metallurgy and materials science at Imperial College London and graduated with a BSc(Eng) (first class) in materials science in 1980, and was awarded the Bessemer Prize. He obtained a PhD from Imperial in 1983, and was awarded the Matthey Prize.

== Academic career ==
Gregson was appointed to a lectureship at the University of Southampton in 1983 and became professor of Aerospace Materials in 1995. During his research career, he published over 160 papers, books and patents with over 80 being in premier academic journals. He was academic director of the Luxfer Advanced Technology Centre (1998–2004), the DePuy University Technology Partnership (2000–04) and the Defence and Aerospace Research Partnership (DARP) in Advanced Metallic Airframes. He was a member of the International Committee for the biennial International Conference on Aluminium Alloys (International Conference on Aluminium Alloys (ICAA), 1998–04) and chair of ICAA 2002.

As head of the department and director of Research for Faculty of Engineering & Applied Science (1995–99), he created a new Transport Systems Research Laboratory and founded an Engineering Graduate School.

As deputy vice-chancellor of the University of Southampton (2000–04), he led the development and implementation of an ambitious vision for Enterprise and Innovation, including the partnership with IP2IPO and SETsquared together with the universities of Bristol, Bath and Surrey.

== University leadership roles ==
Gregson became president and vice-chancellor of Queen's University Belfast on 1 August 2004. He repositioned the university academically, gaining accession to the Russell Group in 2006.

External recognition has included Queen's Anniversary Prizes for Green Chemistry and the Comprehensive Cancer Centre (2006 & 2012), Times Higher Education Awards for Innovation in Culture and the Arts (2008), Entrepreneurial University of the Year (2009), Engineering Research Team of the Year (2010), Innovative Teacher of the Year (2011) and Outstanding Fundraising Team (2012), and an Athena Swan Institutional Silver Award (2012). He served as director of the Universities and Colleges Employers Association (2008–2013) and director of Association of Commonwealth Universities (2011–2015).

Strategic international partnerships were established with Georgetown University and Seagate Technology (USA), University Malaya and Petronas (Malaysia), National Institute of Immunology and Videocon (India) and Shanghai Jiao Tong University and China Medical University (China).

Gregson was appointed chief executive and vice-chancellor of Cranfield University in August 2013.

== Professional experience ==
Gregson was non-executive director of Rolls-Royce Group plc (2007–12), and a consultant to Alcan International and Johnson & Johnson Orthopaedics (1986–2004). He served EPSRC in many capacities including as chair of Postgraduate Training Packages (2000) and the academic representative on the User Panel (2004–06). He was a member of the DTI/OST Materials Foresight Panel (1997–99) and Council of CCLRC (2004–06). He has served the Institute of Materials, Minerals and Mining in many roles including as chair of the Alloy Design Committee (1991–92), chair of the Metal Science Committee (1992–93), member of Materials Strategy Commission (1997–99) and Light Metals Division (2000 -2002); He served on the Council of the Royal Academy of Engineering (2005–08) and as chair of Membership Panel 4 (2006–09); He contributed to the Strategic Leadership Consultations of the Windsor Leadership Trust, the Harvard University Programme for University presidents and the American Council on Education Fellows Programme. He served on the Steering Committee of the US/Ireland R&D Partnership (2005–10), the Northern Ireland Economic Development Forum (2006–10) and Council of CBI Northern Ireland (2008–13).

Gregson was appointed chair of the Henry Royce Institute in December 2021.

== Personal life and death ==
Gregson married Rachael Kathleen McClaughry in 1983, and they have three daughters. He was Churchwarden of Romsey Abbey (1991–95) and their charity support included Wooden Spoon, Naomi House, l’Arche Belfast, Arthritis Care (NI) Association, Lyric Theatre and Camerata Ireland. His hobbies included gardening, sailing, tennis and classical music.

Sir Peter Gregson died suddenly on 23 February 2024, at the age of 66.

== Honours and awards ==
Gregson received the Donald Julius Groen Prize of the Institution of Mechanical Engineers (1994) and the Rosenhain Medal and Prize of the Institute of Materials (1996) for his research on the development of advanced aerospace aluminium alloys. He was elected to Fellowship of the Royal Academy of Engineering (2001), Irish Academy of Engineering (2007) and Royal Irish Academy (2007). He received Honorary Degrees from the Bengal Engineering and Science University (2008), National University of Ireland (2008) and University of Southampton (2009). He served as Deputy Lieutenant of Belfast (2007–13) and received the Flax Trust Award for service to the community in 2010.

- Bessemer Prize, Imperial College London, 1980.
- Matthey Prize, Imperial College London, 1983.
- Donald Julius Groen Prize of the Institution of Mechanical Engineers, 1993.
- Rosenhain Medal and Prize of the Institute of Materials, Minerals and Mining, 1996.
- Fellow of the Institute of Materials, Minerals and Mining, 1998.
- Fellow of the Royal Academy of Engineering, 2001.
- Fellow of the Institution of Engineers of Ireland
- Member of the Windsor Leadership Trust, 2002.
- Member of the Royal Irish Academy, 2007.

Academic offices
Preceded by Sir George Bain	President and Vice-Chancellor of Queen's University Belfast; Sir Peter [John] Gregson; 2004–2013	Succeeded by Patrick Johnston
Preceded by Sir John (James) O'Reilly	Vice-Chancellor of Cranfield University; Sir Peter [John] Gregson; 2013–2021	Succeeded by Karen Holford
