= An Cumann Gaelach, QUB =

Irish language society

An Cumann Gaelach Ollscoil na Banríona
- Formation: 30 January 1906
- Type: Irish Language Society
- Location: Queen's University Belfast
- Members: 300+
- Official language: Irish
- Website: http://gaelach.society.qub.ac.uk/

An Cumann Gaelach is the Irish Language Society (Cumann Gaelach) at The Queen's University of Belfast (Irish: Ollscoil na Banríona). Established in 1906, it is the third oldest society still in existence at the University, after the BMSA and Christian Union. The first meeting of the society was held on 30 January 1906, with a medical student, William MacArthur (who later became Lieutenant-General Sir William MacArthur; 1884-1964), being elected the first president. The society is part funded by the University, through the QUB Students' Union.

== History ==
=== Early years ===
The Irish Language Society, An Cumann Gaelach, was founded on 30 January 1906 and was the first language society at the University. The society predates the University itself, which founded in 1908 (previously it had been one of three Queen's Colleges established in 1848).

The establishment of An Cumann Gaelach was part of a movement that had been taking place across Ireland and the Irish communities abroad from the second half of the nineteenth century, which aimed to celebrate traditional Gaelic culture and sport. This period saw the establishment of Conradh na Gaeilge (known as the Gaelic League in English) in 1893 and the Gaelic Athletic Association (GAA) in 1884. Like most of these groups at the time, An Cumann Gaelach was founded by Protestants; indeed, only 25 Catholics attended the University out of a total student population in the region of 400.

=== First president ===
William Porter MacArthur (1884–1964) was the first president of the society, having learned Irish in Cloch Cheannfhaolaidh (Cloughaneely) in the north-west of County Donegal in the north-west of Ulster. MacArthur studied medicine at Queen's and went on to serve in the British Army. He later published a "landmark" paper on cysticercosis, wrote on topics such as the Great Famine, and contributed medical entries to Encyclopædia Britannica. Sir William MacArthur, as he had become, retired in 1941 as a Lieutenant-General.

=== 1920s and 1930s ===
Following the partition of Ireland in 1921, the Irish language became politically associated with Catholic Nationalists who rejected British rule in Ireland. The growing tensions impacted the Irish language movement in Northern Ireland as opinions of the language became influenced by sectarianism. This had an effect on An Cumann Gaelach, and the University's Protestant community became less involved in the society. Between 1925 and 1929, the society had more or less died out until an Irish language revival movement in the University around 1930.

In 1936, the Comhchaidreamh (interrelationship in English) was formed, an organisation that sought to create links among all university Irish societies.

=== 1950s and 1960s ===
The society grew between 1950 and 1970 due to an increase in the student population and a cultural revival of the Irish language throughout Ulster at the time. This increased interest reflected to some extent the rising influence of Comhaltas Uladh, the Ulster council of Conradh na Gaeilge (The Gaelic League). The society's magazine, An Scáthán ('The Mirror'), was formed in 1950 and was published three or four times a year.

From the 1960s, some members of An Cumann Gaelach would travel to Ballinamore in the County Donegal Gaeltacht in the west of Ulster, providing the members with an opportunity to see Irish in use in everyday life.

=== The Troubles ===
The 1970s saw an increase in membership, with more than 300 members for most years in that period. The 1970s also saw the Cumann organise monthly céilís in what is now the Mandela Hall in the Students' Union, as well as continuing the classes and trips to the Gaeltacht. During this period, some University signs included both Irish and English. As the Troubles continued, the membership of the society began to dwindle and many events were either abandoned or downscaled.

== Later activities ==
Following the Good Friday Agreement, the suspicions that had previously surrounded the Irish language began to decrease. An annual survey of Cumainn across Ireland by the Irish language daily, Lá Nua, showed growth in the society's number since the start of the decade, rising from 25 in 2003 to 168 in 2007, making it the largest in Northern Ireland and the fifth largest on the island.

2006 marked the centenary of An Cumann Gaelach with a céilí mór in Belfast's Wellington Park Hotel, and the publication of a magazine. The society continues to run weekly Irish classes and trips to the Gaeltacht, as well as other cultural events such as traditional music sessions, talks and film showings.
