= Queen's University Belfast Students' Union =

Coordinates: 54°35′4″N 5°56′13″W

Queen's Students' Union (QSU)
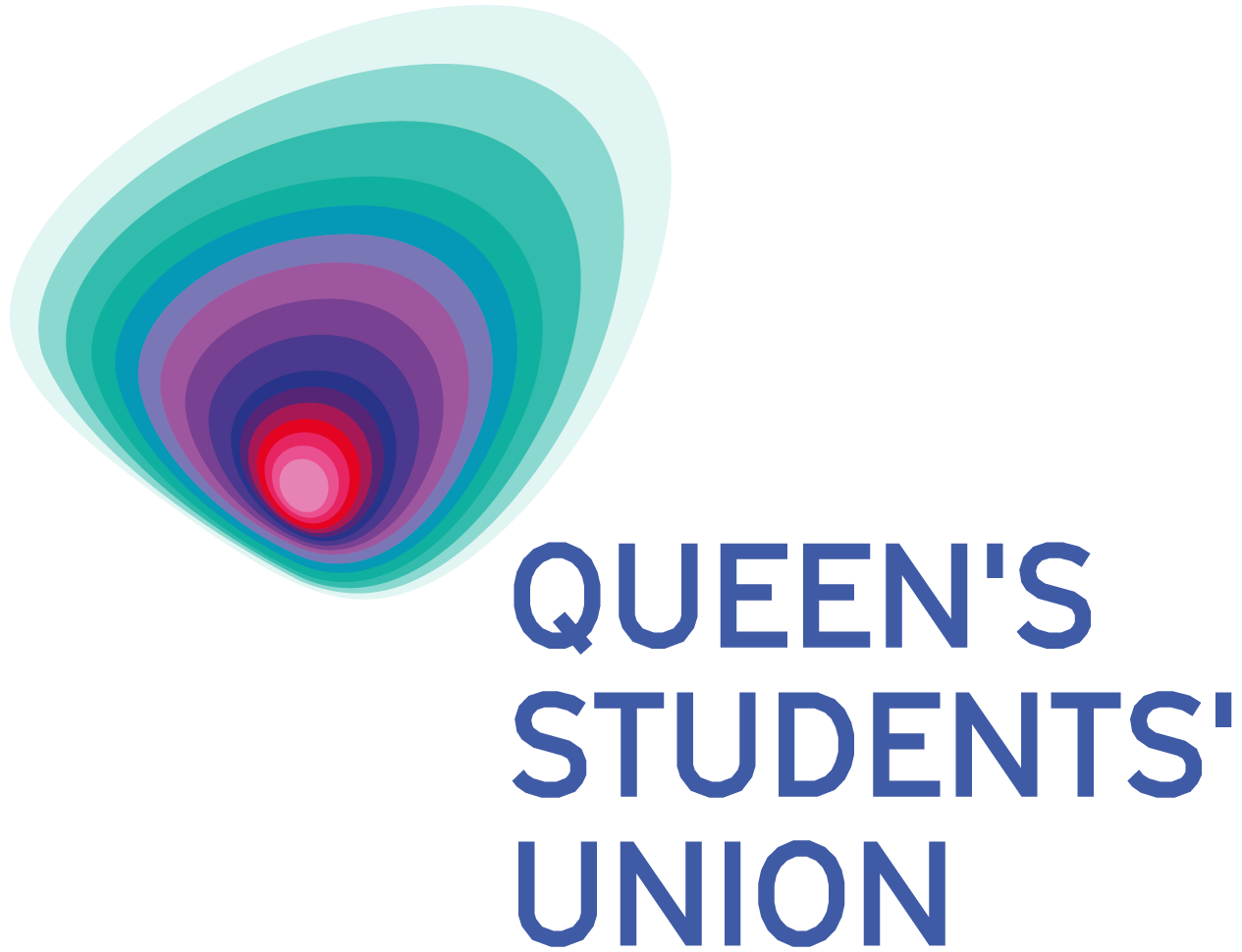

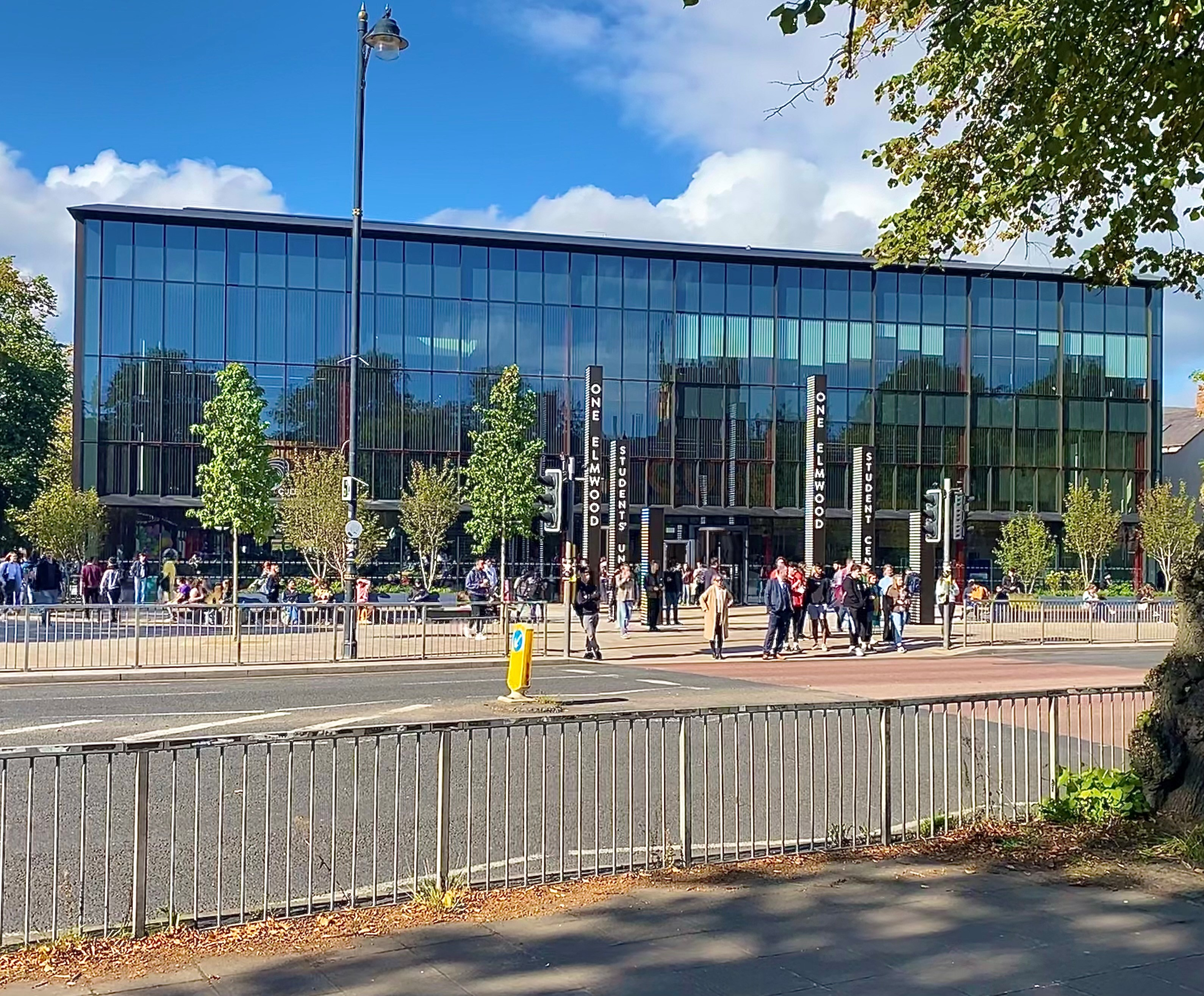
- Institution: Queen's University Belfast
- Location: 1 Elmwood Avenue, Belfast, Northern Ireland
- Established: 1892 – Students' Union Society; 1900 – Students' Representative Council; 1966 – Students' Union
- Sabbatical officers: SU President Amy Smith SO Accessible Education Mórrigan McEvoy SO UG Education Eli McBriarty SO PG Education Nadine Curtis SO Activities & Engagement Róisín Costelloe SO Community & Welare Jack Lydon
- Members: 24,560
- Affiliations: Aldwych Group; National Union of Students (UK); NUS-USI: Student Movement NI; Aontas na Mac Léinn in Éirinn
- Website: www.q-su.org

Queen's Students' Union (QSU) is the official representative body for students at Queen's University Belfast. Membership of the union is automatic and currently totals 24,560, making it one of the largest unions on the island of Ireland and in the United Kingdom. The Students' Union derives its existence and authority from the University's Statutes, and so is not entirely independent of it. Therefore, it must have amendments to its constitution approved by the University Senate. It aims to represent students' interests both with the university and the wider community, to create a sense of student spirit and provide services that aid its student members during their time at Queen's. The Students' Union can trace its origins to the nineteenth century, and has been based on University Road, directly opposite the university's main 'Lanyon Building', since it opened in 1967.

== History ==
The history of the Students' Union can be traced back to the late nineteenth century and to what was then Queen's College, Belfast, which was founded in 1845 and became a separate university in 1908. Student facilities at the College remained minimal until the establishment of the all-male Students' Union Society (SUS), which began fundraising with the support of the College's management to build a dedicated Students' Union building providing services to the College's 400 students. The SUS was responsible for managing the Students' Union building which was located on University Square and was opened on 19 January 1897 by the 5th Earl Cadogan, the Lord Lieutenant of Ireland, during celebrations to mark the College's Golden Jubilee and had been built at a cost of £8,000. The facilities offered by the Students' Union included a shop, cloakroom, billiards and smoking room and meeting and debating chambers as well as a dining room, which was the only part of building always opened to women students. Women had first been admitted to Queen's in September 1889 and in response to the male make-up of the SUS, the Women Students' Hall Society (WSH) was established in 1927 and became based in numbers 20 and 21 on the opposite side of University Square to the Students' Union building.

In 1900, the students' representative council (SRC) was established to provide representation to the institution's students in relations with management and staff, this was in contrast to the mainly social activities of the SUS and the WSH, who were both recognised societies of the SRC. The SRC had offices on University Square, close to the WSH premises and held its meetings in the Union building. These three student organisations came together in 1965 to address ways that they could work better and be more inclusive of all students at the university, in advance of the opening of a new Union building opposite the main Lanyon Building on University Road. This resulted in the establishment of a combined constitution for the three which were to be known as the students' representative council of the Students' Union, which took effect from 1 October 1966. Its name was shortened to the Students' Union in 1975, with the SRC renamed the Students' Union Council in the early 2000s.

As student numbers grew throughout the twentieth century (reaching 2,500 by the 1950s), the University tried to procure a new location for the Union and purchased a premises adjacent to Belfast City Hospital which had formally been the Deaf and Blind Institution, but the state of the building meant that another alternative had to be found. The university then decided to demolish the Queen's Elms building at the corner of University Road and Elmwood Avenue, and build a new Union from scratch, which was opened in 1967. A plan to demolish the Union building and replace it with what was called 'Lanyon II' three decades later was denied planning permission and so the decision was taken to redevelop the existing building and bring it up to modern standards. The original building had been constructed to cater for 6,000 and was struggling to cope with a student population that had reached almost 25,000 by 2005. The result was a £9 million facelift which began in 2005, and officially reopened on 21 March 2007. The work had been funded through donations from the University and Alumni, but the bulk came in the form of large loans being taken out by the Union.

In 2018, the Students' Union building was closed in order to make way for construction of a new building which combines both the Student Guidance Centre and the Students' Union. Interim facilities were provided in the Elmwood Teaching Centre whilst construction was taking place.

The new building, officially named One Elmwood, opened on 5 September 2022.

=== Protests ===
In 2015, the Fossil Free QUB group occupied the university Administration Building to protest against the university's continued investments in fossil fuels. This group, led by QSU President Seán Fearon, succeeded in securing commitment from Queen's University that they would divest from fossil fuels by the year 2025.

=== Irish Language Rights Referendum ===
In 2026, the QSU ran a student led Referendum calling for: an Irish Language Policy granting Irish equal status with English, including a bilingual corporate identity (name and logo), bilingual campus signage, and improved services for Irish-speaking students such as forms, administrative support, and graduation certificates in Irish.

The subsequent ‘Yes’ campaign was led by An Cumann Gaelach, with Eoghan Ó Conghaile acting as spokesperson, while the ‘No’ campaign was led by QUB Young Unionists, represented by Jay Basra.

== Governance ==
=== Students' Union Council (SUC) ===
Currently, the Union is governed by an Executive Committee who are aided by a number of full-time staff, and answerable to the Students' Union Council (SUC).

Elections for the SUC take place in October and seats are filled through proportional representation (PR), with constituencies representing each faculty.

The Union existed as "Queen's Elms" in 1859 was followed by a replacement building in 1965.

=== Executive ===
The executive management committee (EMC) of the union comprises the six sabbatical (full-time) officers, which was reduced from seven from the 2016/17 academic year, and the director and deputy director. In addition to this, there are 16 non-sabbatical (part-time) officers, including the Union Speaker, who also sit on the EMC. The EMC is responsible for overseeing the day-to-day work of the Union and works with the management board in setting strategy and measuring outputs, with the management board also having a number of external 'trustees' and representatives from the university.

The sabbatical officers are elected in March every year, take office from 1 July and represent the students in dealings with the university and other groups.

In November 2018, the Students' Union Council voted to create two new non-sabbatical officer positions: the Trans Students' Officer and the Irish Language Officer.

== Facilities ==
=== Clubs and societies ===
There are more than 50 sporting clubs, including Football (QUB AFC), hockey (QUB Hockey), boating (QUB Boat Club) and Gaelic games. As well as this there are more than one hundred non-sporting societies, including cultural groups like An Cumann Gaelach and the Ulster-Scots Society, gaming societies such as the Dragonslayers, activism societies like the Belfast chapter of oikos International, Amnesty International and debating groups such as the Literary and Scientific Society (Literific) and QUB Model UN, while most of the university's schools and departments also have a corresponding society such as the Law Society and the Belfast Medical Students Association (BMSA). There are also multiple societies serving international students, such as the International Students Society (QISS) and the Malaysian Students Society (MSSNI). Clubs and societies receive annual grants from the university via the VP Student Activities to carry out their educational roles; however, although political clubs and religious societies (such as the Christian Union and the Humanist Society) receive official recognition from the SU Council, they do not receive money from the Union. Most of the main political groups on the island are present at Queen's including: Labour Students (the student wing of the British Labour Party), Northern Ireland Conservative Future (the youth movement of the British Conservative Party), the Young Greens, Queens's Alliance (part of Alliance Youth), Ógra Fianna Fáil (the first branch in Northern Ireland), the Democratic Unionist Association, the Young Unionists, SDLP Youth, Sinn Féin Republican Youth, the Socialist Party and the Socialist Workers Party.

Queen's Students' Union is the long term venue of Q-Con, a gaming convention in the UK. It is an event critically acclaimed by members of the gaming industry, in particular because it is organised exclusively by the members of the Queen's University Dragonslayers society.

== Notable former officers ==
Until the establishment of the Students' Union in 1966, there were three main student organisations at Queen's. The first of these was the students' representative council which was located on University Square and was responsible for representing all students to the university's management. There were also two other groups who served a more social function in student life, the Students' Union Society was based in the Union building and was for male students only, while the Women Students' Hall provided some of the same services to female students and was located on University Square. In 1966 these three were merged to form Queen's University Belfast Students' Union.

- Alex Attwood, president, 1982-1983
- Pól Callaghan, vice president 1999-2000, president 2000-2001
- Mark Durkan, deputy president, 1981-82
- Emma Little-Pengelly, deputy president, 1998-1999
- Adam McGibbon, vice president, 2010-12
- Nick Ross, deputy president, 1968-69
