= Arthur Vick =

Sir Francis Arthur Vick (5 June 1911 – 2 September 1998) was a British physicist and university administrator.

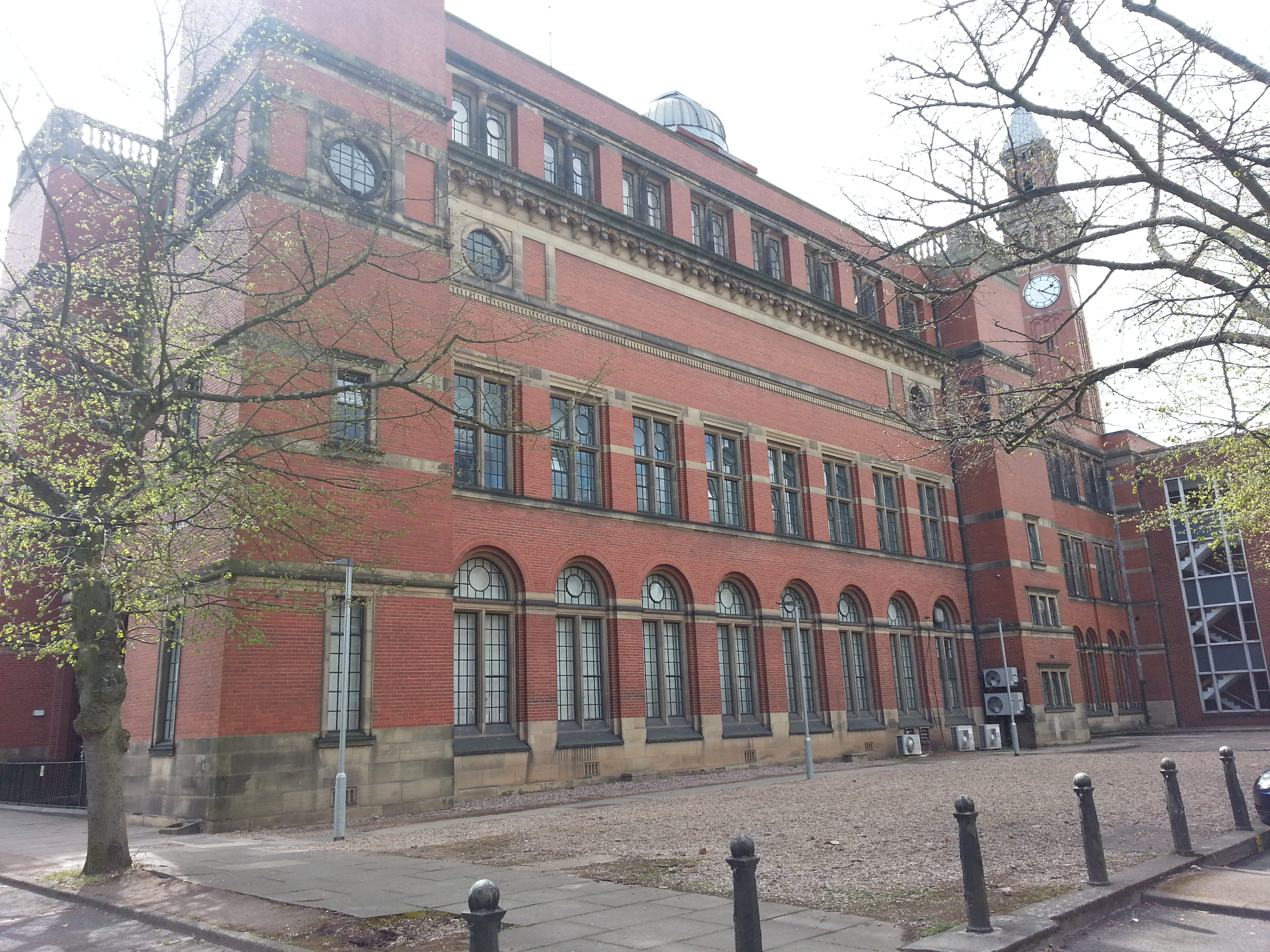
Birmingham University

Vick graduated with a degree in physics from Birmingham University in 1932 and with a PhD in solid state physics from Birmingham University in 1936.

During the Second World War, Vick was an Assistant Director of Research at the Ministry of Supply. Vick was Professor of Physics, Vice-Principal and Acting Principal at the University College of North Staffordshire (which later became Keele University) from 1950 to 1954. He was Director of the Atomic Energy Research Establishment from 1960 to 1964. He was President and Vice-Chancellor of Queen's University Belfast from 1966 to 1976. Sir Arthur Vick was Pro-Chancellor of Warwick University from 1977 to 1992. His legacy remains at the university, with the Arthur Vick accommodation named after him in 1994.

Vick was knighted in 1973 for his services to higher education. He received honorary doctorates from a number of universities including Keele University, Birmingham University, and Queen's University, Belfast.
