= Ian Greer (obstetrician) =

Scottish obstetrician

Sir Ian Greer DL FRCP

13th President and Vice Chancellor of Queen's University Belfast
- Incumbent
- Assumed office 1 August 2018
- Chancellor: Thomas Moran; Hillary Clinton
- Deputy: Richard Miles
- Preceded by: Patrick G. Johnston

Personal details
- Born: 16 April 1958 (age 68) Scotland
- Education: University of Glasgow (MBBS, MD)
- Scientific career
- Fields: Medicine; Obstetrics
- Workplaces: University of Glasgow; University of Edinburgh; Hull York Medical School; University of Liverpool School of Medicine; University of Manchester

Sir Ian Andrew Greer DL FRCP (born 16 April 1958) is a Scottish medical doctor who is the 13th President and Vice-Chancellor of Queen's University Belfast and formerly Vice-President of the University of Manchester and Dean of the Faculty of Medical and Human Sciences. He was Regius Professor of Obstetrics and Gynaecology at the University of Glasgow 2001–2007, Dean at Hull York Medical School 2007–2010, then Pro-Vice-Chancellor of the Faculty of Health and Life Sciences at the University of Liverpool 2010−2015.

== Early life ==
Greer went to Allan Glen's School in Glasgow. He studied at the University of Glasgow graduating with a medical degree.

== Academic career ==
In 1991, Greer joined the University of Glasgow as Head of the Department of Obstetrics and Gynaecology. He held the Muirhead Chair of Obstetrics and Gynaecology from 1992 until 2000. Taking up the post at the age of 33, he was the youngest person to be appointed professor and head of a British department of obstetrics and gynaecology in the 20th century. In 2001, he became Regius Professor of Obstetrics and Gynaecology. He was elected a Fellow of the Academy of Medical Sciences in 2006.

Greer took up the post of Dean of the Hull York Medical School in January 2007. He moved to the University of Liverpool in 2010, becoming Pro-Vice-Chancellor of the Faculty of Health and Life Sciences. In 2013, he was made the Provost responsible for research policy. In early 2015, he was asked to head the Health North scheme which was concerned with eHealth and local innovation.

In March 2015, the University of Manchester appointed him as Vice-President and Dean to lead the Faculty of Medical and Human Sciences. Shortly after this he was named as director of the Manchester Academic Health Science Centre. Queen's University Belfast appointed him as the 13th President and Vice-Chancellor in January 2018. He took office as Vice-Channellor on 1 August 2018.

In January 2020, former U.S. Secretary of State and Democratic presidential candidate Hillary Clinton was appointed to be the 11th Chancellor of Queen's. Clinton is the first female chancellor of the university.

In July 2022, he completed a two year term as President of Universities Ireland, promoting collaboration and serving as the Chair of the Universities Ireland Board, which comprises each vice-chancellor/president of each university on the island of Ireland.

In September 2022, he accepted the unanimous offer of the University Senate for a second term as President and Vice-Chancellor which will take his tenure up to 2030.

He was appointed as a Deputy Lieutenant of Belfast on 11 February 2021. This gave him the Post Nominal Letters "DL" for Life.

In May 2023, Greer spoke of proposed higher education cuts by the Northern Ireland Department for the Economy constituting a "bleak future" if they would go ahead where the number of students from Northern Ireland leaving to study at universities in other parts of the United Kingdom may increase. In June 2023, Greer was knighted in the 2023 Birthday Honours for services to education and to the economy in Northern Ireland. Greer said he was "deeply humbled" to be knighted.
