= Peter Froggatt =

Northern Irish doctor and academic (1928–2020)

Sir Peter Froggatt FSS FRCPI FRCP (12 June 1928 − 3 May 2020) was a Northern Irish epidemiologist and academic. He served as Vice-Chancellor of the Queen's University, Belfast between 1976 and 1986.

== Early life and education ==
He was the son of Albert Victor Froggatt and Edith Curran. He was educated at Royal Belfast Academical Institution, the Royal School, Armagh and Trinity College, Dublin.

== Career ==
He worked at Sir Patrick Dun’s Hospital, Dublin and at Short Brothers and Harland & Wolff in Belfast.

He joined Queen’s University in 1959; he became Professor of Epidemiology in 1968 and Dean of the Faculty of Medicine in 1971.

He became Vice Chancellor of Queen's University in 1976.

He also served on several committees and societies, including The Independent Scientific Committee on Smoking and Health, as well as the National Deaf Childrens’ Society (NI), Age Concern (NI), the Ulster Cancer Foundation, Co-Operation North, the American Ireland Fund and the NI Association for Mental Health; he was also an elder in the Presbyterian Church.

He was the Chairman of the Ulster College of Music during the 1990s.

== Honours ==
He was knighted in 1985.

He was a Foundation Fellow of the Faculty of Occupational Medicine, Royal College of Physicians of Ireland.

He was a Fellow of the Faculty of Community Medicine at the Royal College of Physicians in London.

The Peter Froggatt Centre at Queen's University is named after him.

== Family ==
He was married to Norma and they had four children.
