= Patrick G. Johnston =

Physician

President and Vice-Chancellor of Queen's University Belfast
- In office 1 March 2014 – 4 June 2017
- Preceded by: Sir Peter Gregson
- Succeeded by: Sir Ian Greer

Personal details
- Born: 14 September 1958 Derry, Northern Ireland
- Died: 4 June 2017 (aged 58) County Donegal, Ireland
- Children: 4
- Education: University College Dublin
- Profession: Physician cancer researcher academic
- Website: Vice-Chancellor's Office

Patrick G. Johnston FRCP FRCPI FMedSci (14 September 1958 – 4 June 2017) was a Northern Irish physician and a leading expert in cancer research. He was a professor of oncology at Queen's University Belfast, where he served as vice-chancellor and president from 1 March 2014, until his death.

== Early life and education ==
Johnston grew up in the Waterside area of Derry, Northern Ireland. His father was a teacher, as were several of his aunts and uncles. At age 14, he first thought about becoming a doctor because of an interest in chemistry and biology. He attended St. Columb's College and obtained a MB BCh with distinction from University College Dublin (UCD).

== Career ==
After qualifying from UCD, Johnston worked in the Mater and St James's hospitals in Dublin, where he specialised in oncology and hematology.

In 1987, he took up a fellowship at the National Cancer Institute at Bethesda, Maryland, where he undertook doctoral studies in molecular pharmacology and was subsequently offered tenure in 1993.

He began his career at Queen's in 1996, when he was appointed professor of oncology. Prior to his appointment as vice-chancellor, he was dean of the School of Medicine, Dentistry and Biomedical Sciences. In 2007, he led the development of a new international medical school at Queen's and the Institute of Health Sciences. Prior to this, he was the director of the Centre for Cancer Research and Cell Biology at the University.

Johnston was made chair of the Translational Research Group of the Medical Research Council (MRC) in 2012. He received the 2013 International Bob Pinedo Cancer Care Prize for his work in translating discovery science for the benefit of cancer patients. He served on the Cancer Research UK (CR-UK) Science Executive/Advisory Board and co-founded Almac Diagnostics (based in Craigavon) and the Society for Translational Oncology in Durham, North Carolina.

He was a fellow of the Academy of Medical Sciences (appointed 2012) and the National Cancer Institute (appointed 1987). He was made a senior investigator at the NCI in 1991. In 2012 he was awarded the Diamond Jubilee Queen's Anniversary Prize, for his leadership at the University's Comprehensive Cancer Centre.

Johnston had a vision for Queen's as a world-class international university supporting outstanding students and staff, working in world-class facilities, conducting leading-edge education and research focused on the needs of society. This vision had been challenged by some as "marketisation", contrary to the nature of the university as a seat of culture, learning, open-mindedness and free speech. On 20 April 2015, Johnston was reported to have cancelled a conference on Understanding Charlie: New perspectives on contemporary citizenship after Charlie Hebdo, citing "security risks" and "the reputation of the university". This was criticised as censoring an academic forum on the subject of free speech.

After a reconsideration of the security and academic implications, the conference proceeded.

== Personal life ==
Johnston was married to Iseult and had four sons, Seamus, Eoghan, Niall and Ruairi, and one grandson.

He died suddenly after a bicycle ride in June 2017 in County Donegal. His funeral was held St Brigid's Parish Church in Belfast.
