= Queen's University Belfast =

Public university in Belfast, Northern Ireland

- Ollscoil na Banríona
- Coat of arms
- Motto: Latin: Pro tanto quid retribuamus?
- Motto in English: For so much, what shall we give back?
- Type: Public research university
- Established: 1810 – R.B.A. Institution; 1845 – Queen's College; 1908 – university status
- Academic affiliations: ACU; EUA; Russell Group; Universities Ireland; Universities UK; Utrecht Network; Defence Universities Alliance
- Endowment: £75.0 million (2025)
- Budget: £493.8 million (2024/25)
- Chancellor: Hillary Clinton
- Vice-Chancellor: Sir Ian Greer
- Academic staff: 2,110 (2024/25)
- Administrative staff: 2,730 (2024/25)
- Students: 25,080 (2024/25); 21,740 FTE (2024/25)
- Undergraduates: 18,210 (2024/25)
- Postgraduates: 6,870 (2024/25)
- Other students: 2,250 (Colleges)
- Location: Belfast, Northern Ireland; 54°35′3″N 5°56′5″W
- Campus: Urban
- Newspaper: The Gown
- Colours: Blue, green and black
- Nickname: QUB
- Website: qub.ac.uk

The Queen's University of Belfast, commonly known as Queen's University Belfast (Irish: Ollscoil na Banríona; abbreviated Queen's or QUB), is a public research university in Belfast, Northern Ireland. The university received its charter in 1845 as part of the Queen's University of Ireland and opened four years later, together with University of Galway (as Queen's College, Galway) and University College Cork (as Queen's College, Cork).

Queen's offers approximately 300 academic degree programmes at various levels. The current president and vice-chancellor is Ian Greer. The annual income of the institution for 2024–25 was £493.8 million, of which £112.4 million was from research grants and contracts, with an expenditure of £511.5 million.

Queen's is a member of the Russell Group of research-intensive universities, the Association of Commonwealth Universities, the European University Association, Universities UK and Universities Ireland. The university is associated with two Nobel laureates and one Turing Award laureate.

== History ==
Queen's University Belfast has roots in the Belfast Academical Institution, which was founded in 1810 and which remains as the Royal Belfast Academical Institution. The present university was first chartered as "Queen's College, Belfast" when it was associated with the simultaneously founded Queen's College, Cork, and Queen's College, Galway on 30 December 1845 as part of the Queen's University of Ireland – founded to encourage higher education for Catholics and Presbyterians, as a counterpart to Trinity College, Dublin, then an almost exclusively Anglican institution. Queen's College, Belfast, opened in 1849. Its main building, the Lanyon Building, was designed by the English-born architect, Sir Charles Lanyon. At its opening, it had 23 professors and 195 students. Some early students at Queen's University Belfast took University of London examinations.

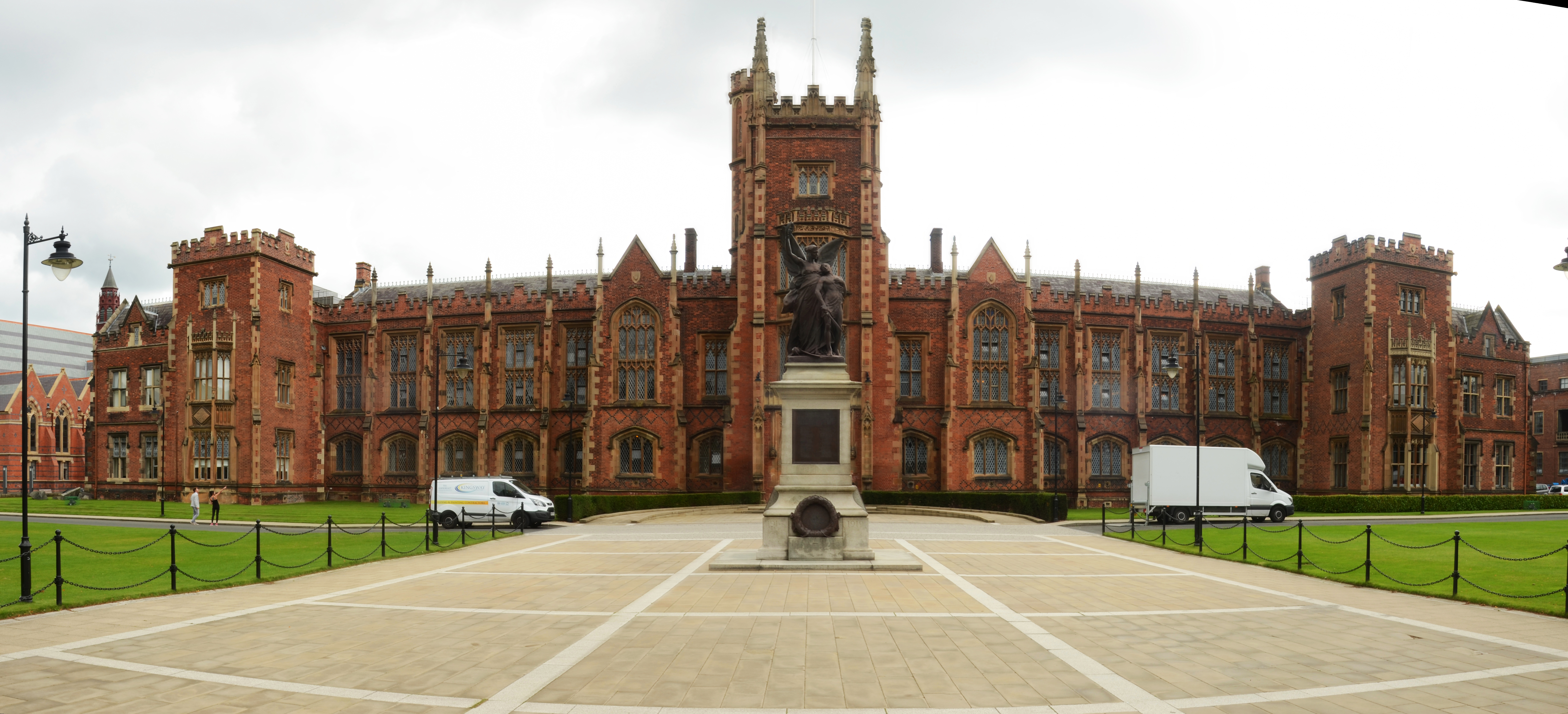
The Lanyon Building

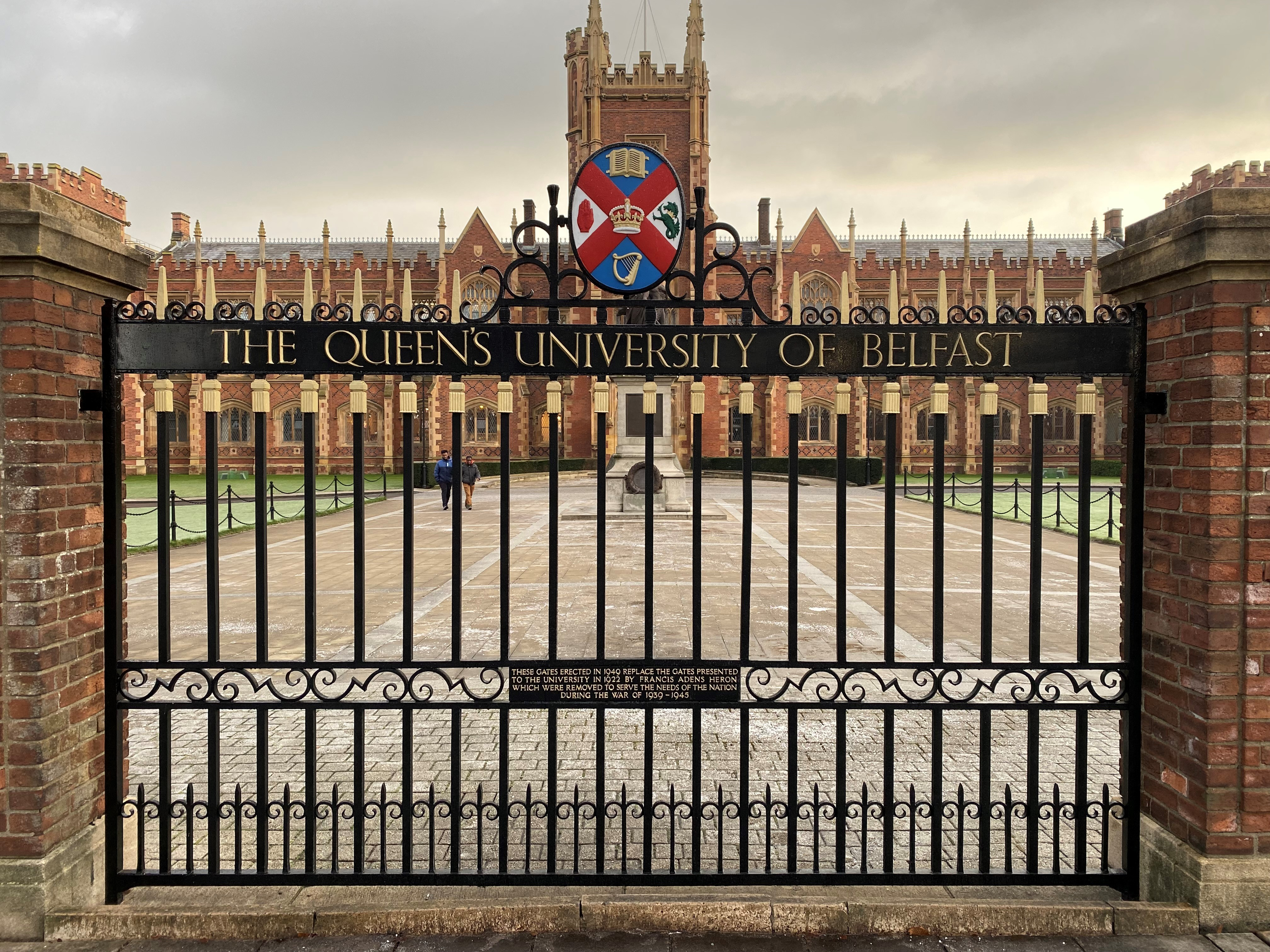
The Lanyon Building Gates

The Irish Universities Act 1908 dissolved the Royal University of Ireland, which had replaced the Queen's University of Ireland in 1879, and created two separate universities: the current National University of Ireland and Queen's University of Belfast.

In November 2025, it was announced that Dundalk Institute of Technology will become a constituent college of Queen's University Belfast from September 2026, thereby giving Queen's a Republic of Ireland campus for the first time. In May 2026, it was announced that Dundalk Institute of Technology would be renamed Dundalk University College in light of the partnership, and that Queen's University Belfast would begin conferring awards upon Dundalk students from 2027.

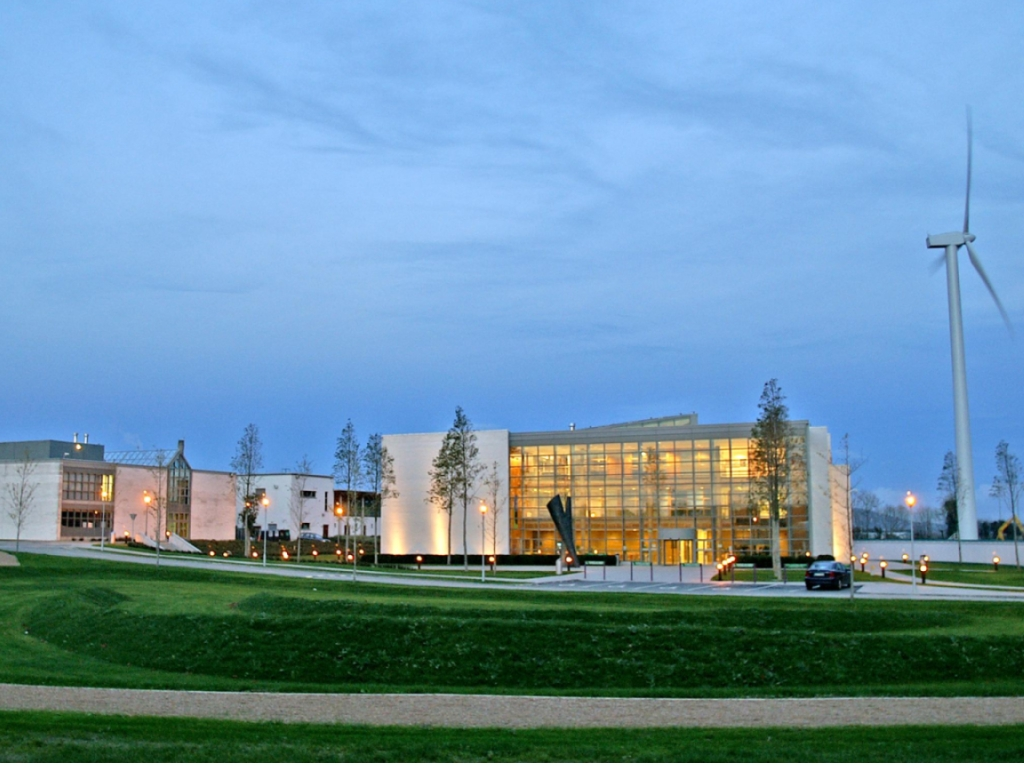
Dundalk Institute of Technology's Nursing Building

=== Parliamentary representation ===
The university was one of only eight United Kingdom universities to hold a parliamentary seat in the House of Commons at Westminster until such representation was abolished in 1950. The university was also represented in the Parliament of Northern Ireland from 1920 to 1968, when graduates elected four members.

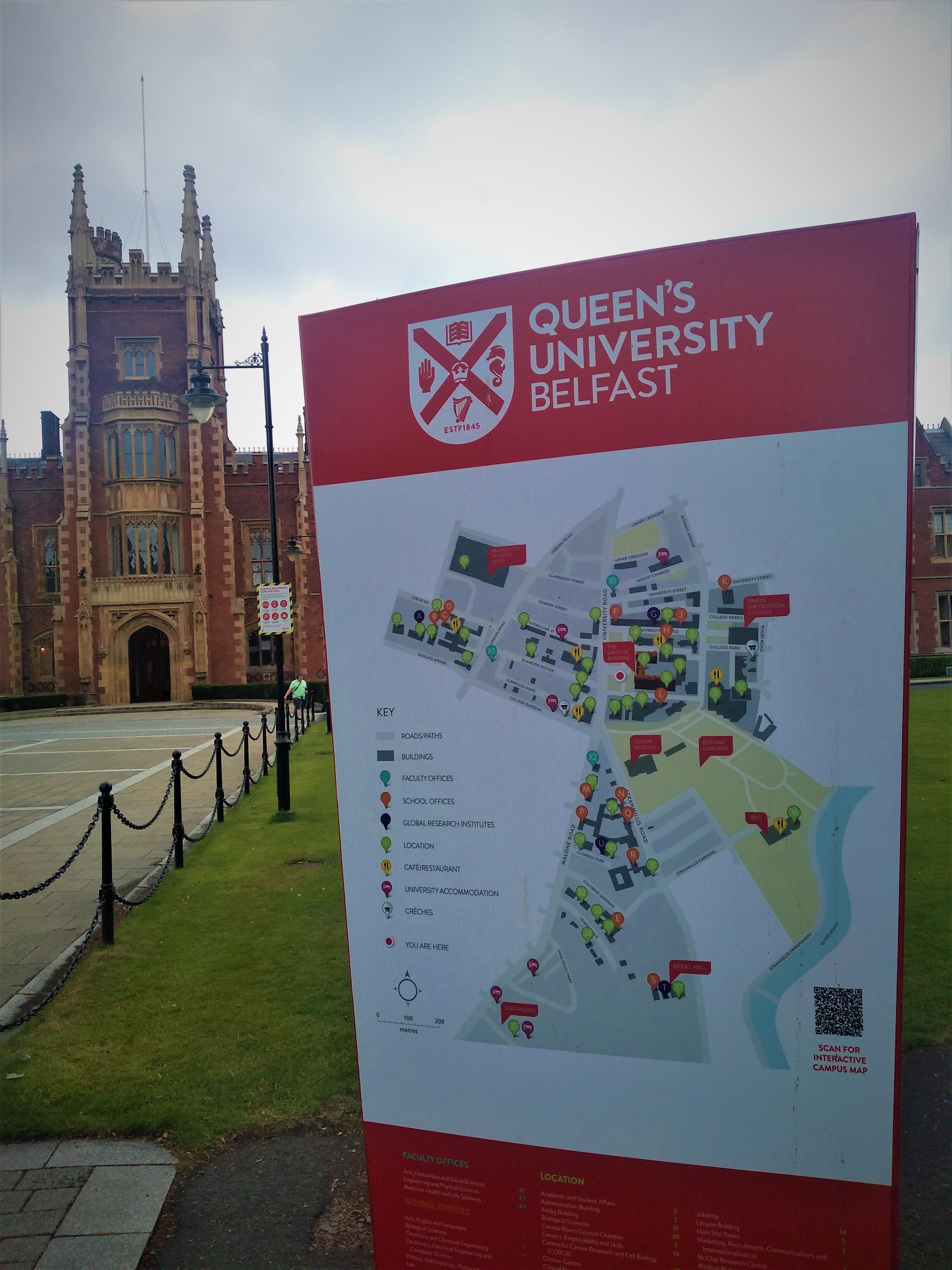
Queen's University Belfast Map

== Contemporary university life ==
On 20 June 2006, the university announced a £259 million investment programme focusing on facilities, recruitment and research. One of the outcomes of this investment has been a new university library; the McClay library was designed by Boston-based architects Shepley Bulfinch, working in association with Belfast architects, Robinson Patterson Partnership, and opened in July 2009. The building has been named in honour of Sir Allen McClay, a major benefactor of Queen's University and of the Library.

In June 2010, the university announced the launch of a £7.5 million Ansin international research hub with Seagate Technology.

Also in that year, Queen's was one of the largest employers in Northern Ireland, with a total workforce of 3,903, of whom 2,414 were members of academic, academic-related and research staff and 1,489 were administrative employees.

== Campus ==
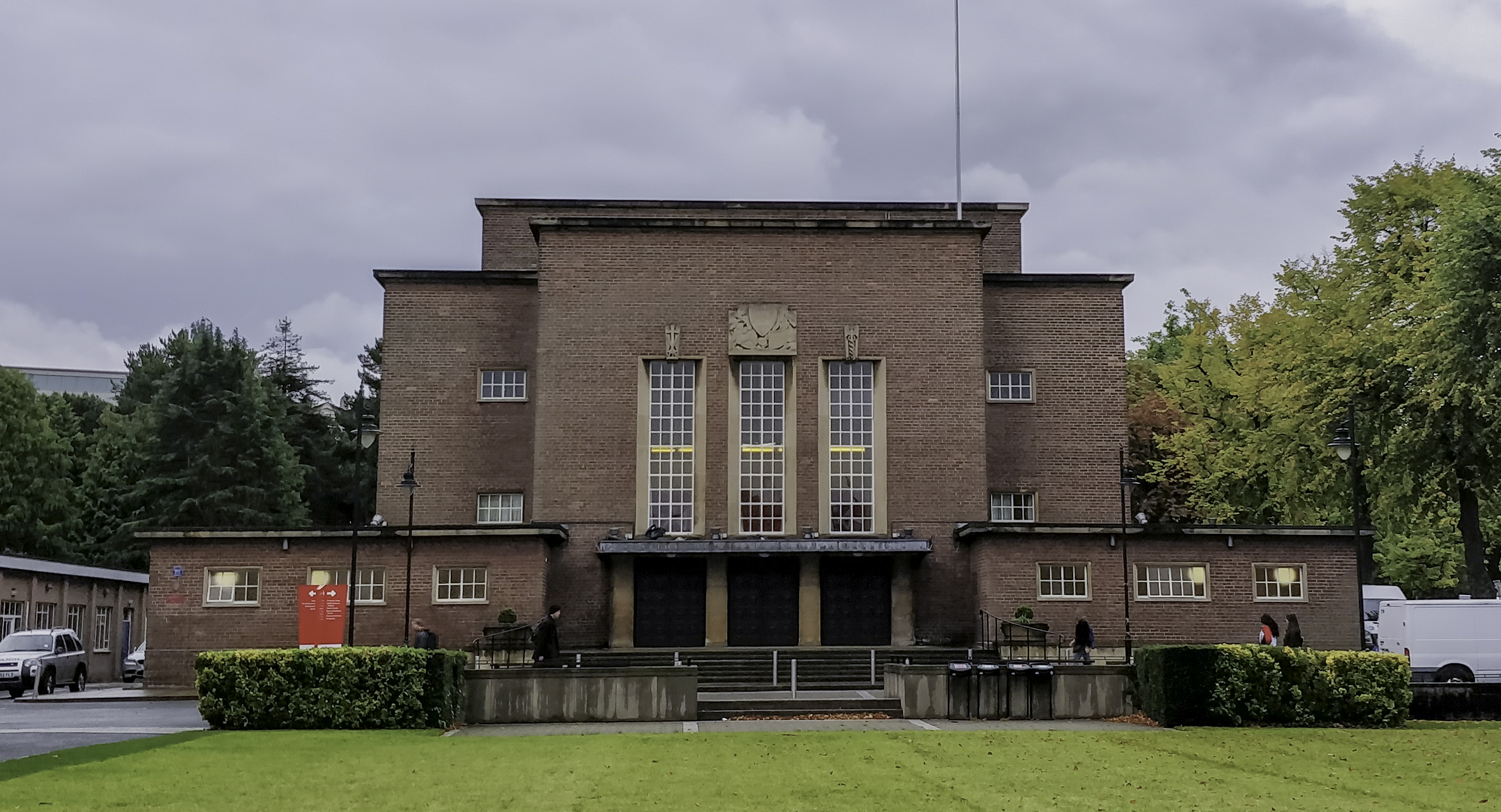
Whitla Hall

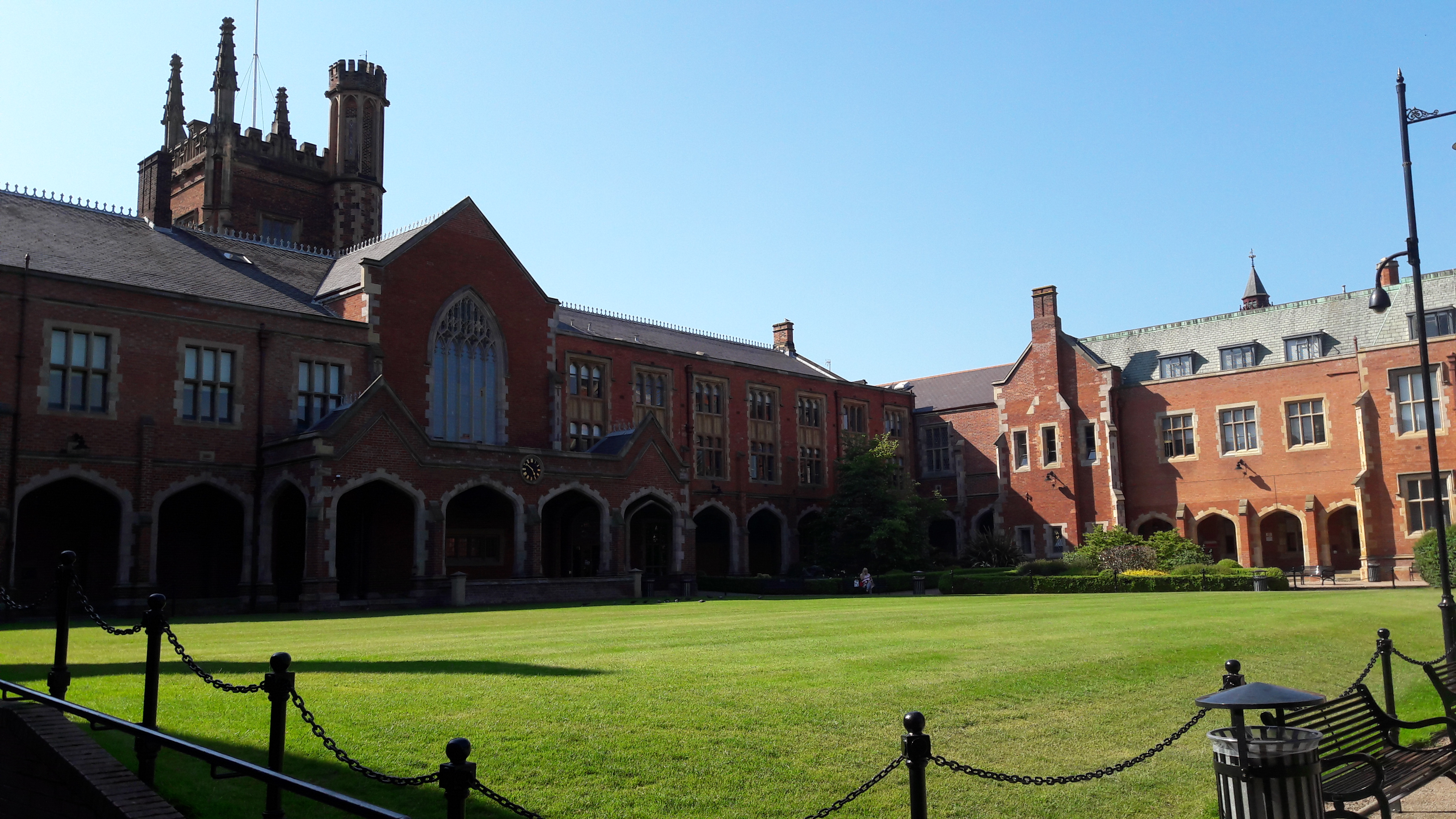
Lanyon Quadrangle

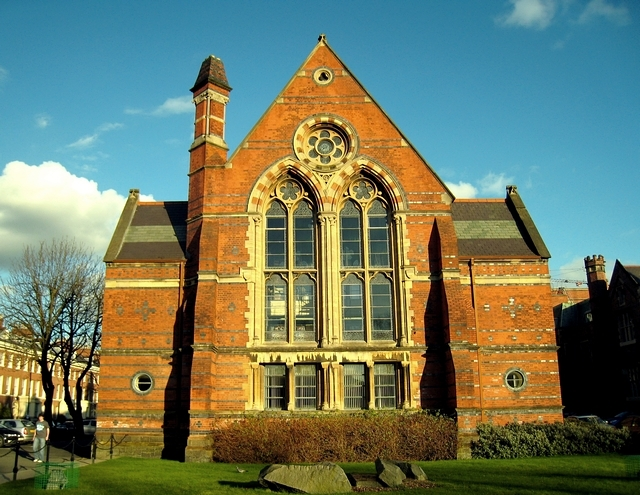
The Thomas J. Moran Graduate School

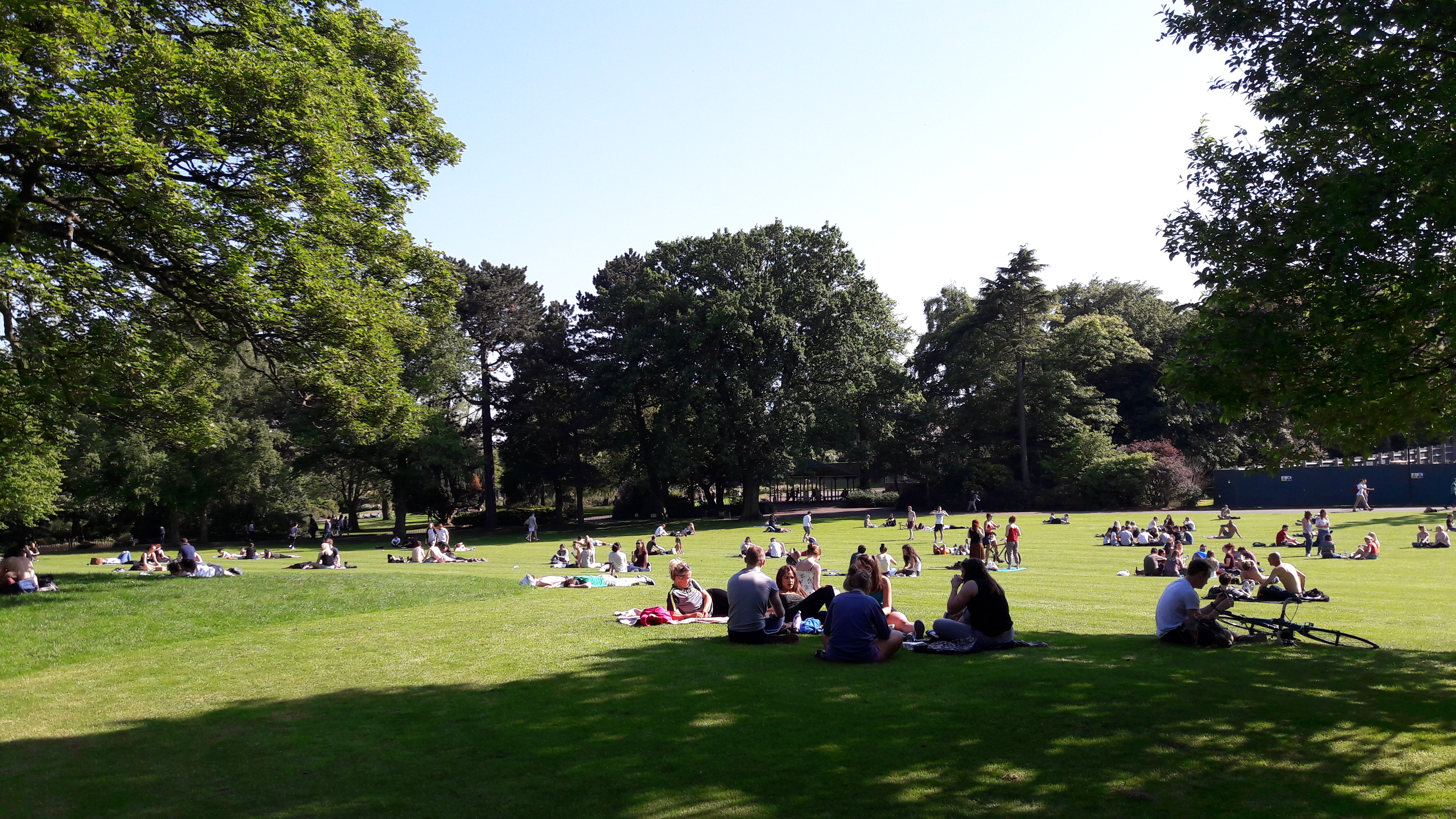
Students in the adjacent Botanic Gardens

In addition to the main campus on the southern fringes of Belfast city centre, the university has two associated university colleges, St Mary's and Stranmillis, located in the west and south-west of the city respectively. These colleges offer teacher training for those who wish to pursue teaching careers and a range of degree courses, all of which are centred around a liberal arts core. From September 2026, Dundalk Institute of Technology will also become a university college of Queen's.

Although the university refers to its main site as a campus, the university's buildings are spread over a number of public streets in South Belfast; primarily, University Road, University Square, University Street, Malone Road and Stranmillis Road, with other departments located further afield such as in Titanic Quarter and Portaferry.

== Organisation and governance ==
=== Faculties and schools ===
Academic life at Queen's is organised into fifteen schools across three faculties: the Faculty of Arts, Humanities & Social Sciences (AHSS); the Faculty of Engineering & Physical Sciences (EPS); and the Faculty of Medicine, Health & Life Sciences (MHLS). Each of the faculties operate as a primary management unit of the university and the schools are the focus for education and research for their respective subject areas.

- Faculty of Arts, Humanities & Social Sciences
  - School of Arts, English and Languages
  - School of History, Anthropology, Philosophy and Politics
  - School of Law
  - Queen's Business School
  - School of Social Sciences, Education and Social Work
- Faculty of Engineering & Physical Sciences
  - School of Chemistry and Chemical Engineering
  - School of Electronics, Electrical Engineering and Computer Science
  - School of Mathematics and Physics
  - School of Mechanical and Aerospace Engineering
  - School of Natural and Built Environment
  - School of Psychology
- Faculty of Medicine, Health & Life Sciences
  - School of Biological Sciences
  - School of Medicine, Dentistry and Biomedical Sciences
  - School of Nursing and Midwifery
  - School of Pharmacy

=== Institutes and research centres ===
- Institute for Global Food Security (IGFS) – A subsidiary of the School of Biological Sciences, IGFS was established in 2013 primarily to research and address key questions about the future of the world's food systems.
- The Senator George J. Mitchell Institute For Global Peace, Security And Justice – Established in 2012, the Institute aims to contribute to conflict transformation and social justice.
- Institute of Cognition and Culture – Established in 2004, ICC is one of the world's first centres for research in the cognitive science of culture.
- Institute of Electronics, Communications and Information Technology (ECIT) – Established in 2003, ECIT aims to commercialize research and expertise in a variety of enabling digital communications technologies at the School of Electronics, Electrical Engineering and Computer Science (EEECS).
- Institute of Irish Studies – Established in 1955, the Institute was the first of its kind to be established in the world and is one of the leading centres for research-led teaching in Irish Studies and is an internationally renowned centre of interdisciplinary Irish scholarship.
- Institute of Professional Legal Studies (IPLS) – Established in 1977, IPLS provides an internationally recognised and unique one-year postgraduate course for trainee barristers and trainee solicitors.
- Institute of Spatial and Environmental Planning (ISEP) – A department of the School of Natural and Built Environment. Established in 2000, ISEP specialises in research projects regarding planning and development courses.
- Institute of Theology – This previously consisted of several colleges with a Christian emphasis, including St Mary's (Catholic), Union Theological College (Presbyterian), Belfast Bible College (non-denominational), as well as the Irish Baptist College and Edgehill Theological College (Methodist) colleges in Belfast. Any programmes with a theological emphasis were taught by these five colleges on behalf of the university; the university could confer theology degrees but could not teach the subject itself. The provision of theology came to an end after a previous Professor of Church History was dismissed by the Presbyterian Church in Ireland.
- William J. Clinton Leadership Institute – A department of Queen's Business School. Established in 2011, the Leadership Institute provides leadership development and training courses to private, public and third sectors outside QUB.
- Queen's University Centre for Economic History (QUCEH) – a research centre of Queen's Business School. Established in 2012, QUCEH brings together faculty and graduate students working on the economic study of the past from across the university and elsewhere.
- Sonic Arts Research Centre (SARC) – A department of the School of Arts, English and Languages. Established in 2006, SARC has been instrumental in the use of networked music performance as both collaborative and performance tools.

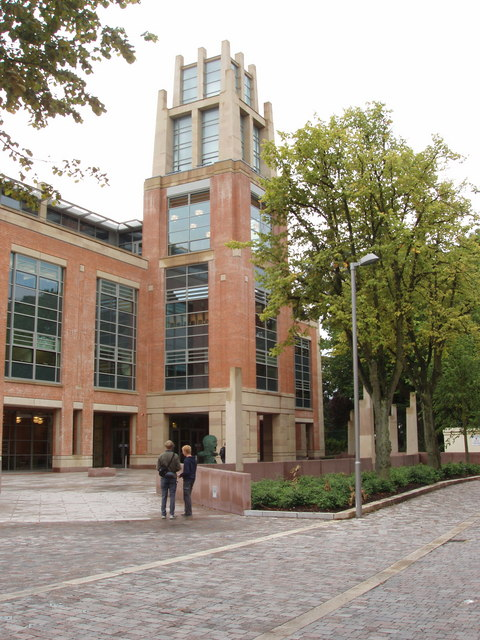
The McClay Library

=== Governance ===
The effective head of the university is its vice-chancellor. The current vice-chancellor, Ian Greer, was appointed in January 2018, following the sudden death of the previous vice-chancellor, Patrick Johnston. Previous vice-chancellors have included Sir David Keir, Lord Ashby of Brandon, Michael Grant, Sir Arthur Vick, Sir Peter Froggatt, Sir Gordon Beveridge, Sir George Bain and Sir Peter Gregson.

The role of chancellor is a largely a ceremonial one, involving attending graduations, acting as an ambassador for the university abroad and serving as an advisor to the vice-chancellor. The current chancellor is Hillary Clinton, who was appointed the university's first female chancellor in January 2020 (and was inaugurated in September 2021), taking over from previous incumbent Thomas Moran, who died in August 2018. Clinton had been given an honorary doctorate from the university in October 2018. Previous chancellors have included Anthony Ashley-Cooper, 9th Earl of Shaftesbury, Field Marshal Alan Brooke, 1st Viscount Alanbrooke, Sir Tyrone Guthrie, Eric Ashby, Baron Ashby, and George J. Mitchell.

=== Finances ===
In the financial year ending 31 July 2024, Queen's had a total income of £474.2 million (2022/23 – £462.8 million) and total expenditure of £345.9 million (2022/23 – £466.5 million). Key sources of income included £160 million from tuition fees and education contracts (2022/23 – £160.9 million), £107.4 million from funding body grants (2022/23 – £108.2 million), £105.2 million from research grants and contracts (2022/23 – £103.1 million), £12.4 million from investment income (2022/23 – £8.1 million) and £3.6 million from endowment donations (2022/23 – £3.1 million).

At year end, Queen's had endowments of £70.9 million (2023 – £65.6 million) and total net assets of £658 million (2023 – £505.4 million). It holds the twentieth-largest endowment of any university in the UK.

== Academic profile ==
=== Research ===
Rankings
National rankings
- Complete (2027): 23
- Guardian (2027): 43
- Times / Sunday Times (2027): 27

Global rankings
- ARWU (2026): 201–300
- QS (2027): =174
- THE (2026): =198

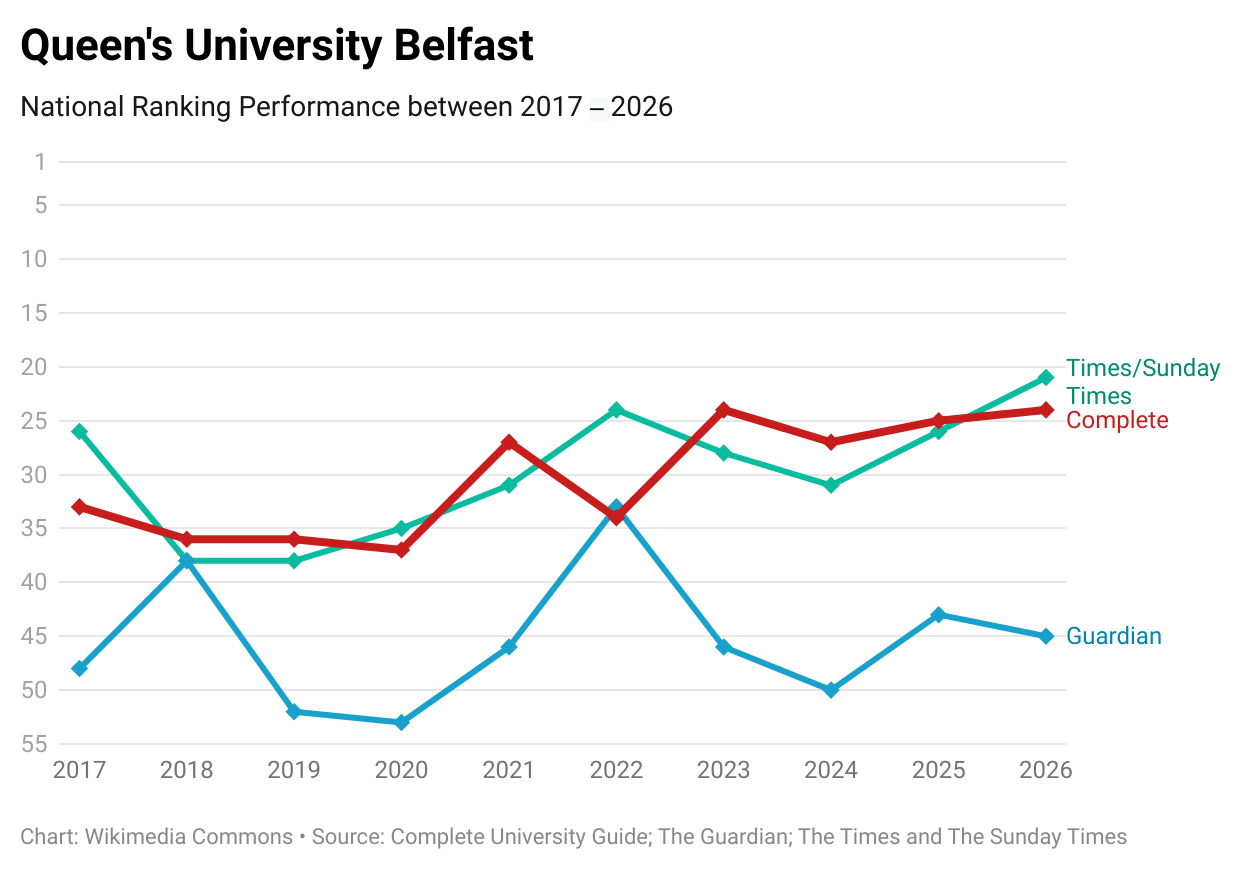
Queen's University Belfast's national league table performance over the past ten years

Queen's University Belfast was admitted as a member of the self-appointed Russell Group of UK research-intensive universities in November 2006. In the 2021 Research Excellence Framework (REF), which assesses the quality of research in UK higher education institutions, the university is ranked 37th by GPA and 24th for research power (the grade point average score of a university, multiplied by the full-time equivalent number of researchers submitted).

=== Rankings and reputation ===
The Times Higher Education rankings 2018 placed Queen's 32nd out of 93 in the UK. In the 2024 QS World University Rankings, Queen's was ranked 204. It ranked 258th among the universities around the world by SCImago Institutions Rankings.

In the National Student Survey 2013, Queen's was ranked 12th in the UK for student satisfaction.

Queen's is ranked 204 in the world according to the 2023 QS World University Rankings. Research at the university includes investigations of cancer, sustainability, radiocarbon dating, wireless technology, creative writing, pharmaceuticals and sonic arts. In 2016, the university ranked 36th in the UK according to the Complete University Guide.

The university has been awarded the Queen's Anniversary Prize for Further and Higher Education on several occasions, including for work in comprehensive cancer services and improving survival rates for patients in Northern Ireland. In 2015, Queen's was awarded the Queen's Anniversary Prize for work in the field of engineering and technology.

The university also holds a university-wide Athena SWAN Gold Award in recognition of work to support and transform gender equality in Higher Education and Research, thereby becoming the first university on the island of Ireland and only the second in the UK to achieve such an award.

=== Admissions ===
UCAS Admission Statistics
	2025	2024	2023	2022	2021
Applications (Note: Main scheme applications, International and UK)	29,750	29,800	29,825	29,505	28,355
Accepted	5,120	4,995	4,885	4,695	5,065
Applications/Accepted Ratio	5.8	6.0	6.1	6.3	5.6
Overall Offer Rate (%)	72.9	70.5	67.7	66.0	67.4
↳ UK only (%) (Note: UK domiciled applicants)	76.6	73.6	70.9	68.6	68.0
Average Entry Tariff	—N/a	—N/a	150	158	156
↳ Top three exams (Note: The maximum tariff score for three exams is 168: the equivalent of A*A*A* at A-Level, 777 at HL for the IB Diploma Programme, or AAA at Advanced Higher)	—N/a	—N/a	140.1	141.9	141.8

HESA Student Body Composition (2024/25)
Domicile and Ethnicity	Total
British White (Note: Not be confused solely with White British)	71%
British Ethnic Minorities (Note: Includes those who indicate that they identify as Asian, Black, Mixed Heritage, Arab or any other ethnicity except White.)	7%
International EU	7%
International Non-EU	15%
Undergraduate Widening Participation Indicators
Female	60%
Independent School	3%

The university is designated as a 'high-tariff' institution by the Department for Education, with the average undergraduate entrant to the university in recent years amassing between 140–142 UCAS Tariff points in their top three pre-university qualifications – the equivalent of AAB to AAA at A-Level. Based on 2022/23 HESA entry standards data published in domestic league tables, which include a broad range of qualifications beyond the top three exam grades, the average student at QUB achieved 158 points – the 26th highest in the United Kingdom. There are about 6 applications per place, with about two-thirds of applicants coming from Northern Ireland and most apply for multiple courses. The Sunday Times has described the Queen's admissions policy as "among the most socially inclusive in Britain and Northern Ireland". 99.5% of first degree entrants are from state schools, although this is mainly due to the lack of private schools in Northern Ireland. The university gave offers of admission to 86.1% of its applicants in 2015, the third highest amongst the Russell Group.

In the 2024/25 academic year, the total student population was 24,915, of whom 18,310 were undergraduates and 6,605 postgraduates. In the 2016–17 academic year, the university had a domicile breakdown of 87:4:9 of UK:EU:non-EU students respectively with a female to male ratio of 56:44. There was also a total student population of 2,250 at its St Mary's and Stranmillis university colleges as of 2013/2014.

The university was established with the aim of attracting both Protestant and Catholic students. While the university does not publish data on the religion affiliation of its students, Rupert Taylor, who conducted his PhD research on the university during The Troubles, argued in an article published in 1988 that "Whilst in the past, especially before the Second World War, Catholics were under-represented this is not currently the case". Taylor cites data showing that Catholic representation among undergraduates rose from 21.9 per cent in 1958/59 to 27.4 per cent in 1968/69 and 42.5 per cent in 1978/79. By the late 1990s, 54 per cent of Queen's students were Catholics, compared to a 48 per cent share of the Northern Ireland population aged 18–25. The growing share of Catholics in the student population is partially due to the tendency of middle-class Protestants to attend university in Great Britain rather than in Northern Ireland.

In 2009, Queen's signed a joint venture partnership with INTO University Partnerships, creating INTO Queen's University Belfast. The INTO centre is based on campus and provides a foundation year for international students who want to study at the university.

== Student life ==
=== Students' Union ===
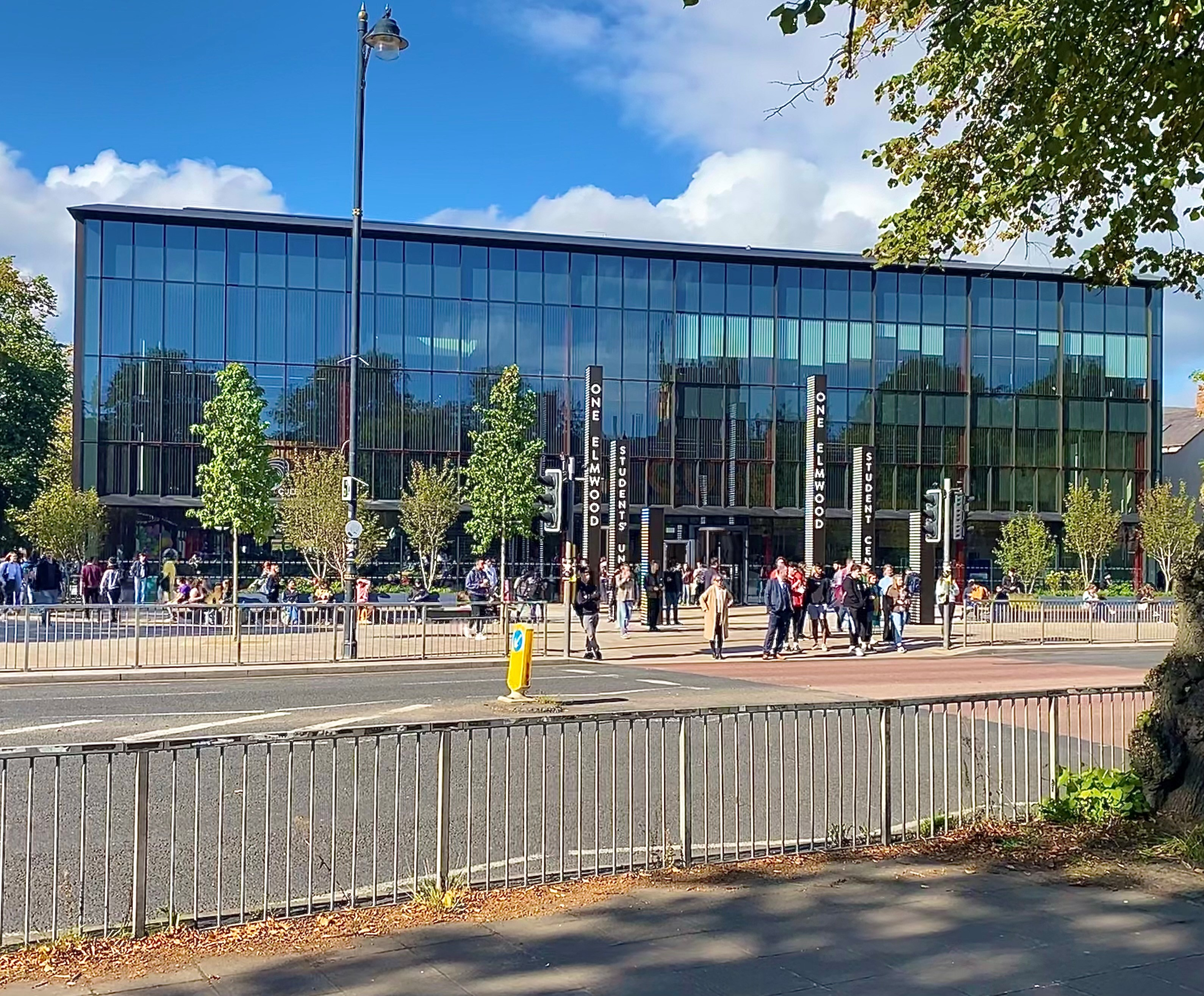
One Elmwood houses both Queen's Students' Union and the Student Guidance Centre

The Students' Union at Queen's (QUBSU) is located opposite the Lanyon Building on University Road, and is provided for under the university's statutes. All students at the university are automatic members of the union, making it one of the largest unions on a single campus in Ireland and the UK. It is administered by the Students' Representative Council (SRC) (elected every October, on a faculty basis) and an executive (elected in March), who manage the operations of the union in conjunction with several full-time staff.

The old union building closed at the end of August 2018 to make way for construction of the new Students' Union building. Interim facilities were provided in other university buildings on Elmwood Avenue and, for the Speakeasy bar, an acquired space on the Lisburn Road (opposite the Medical Biology Centre).

The new Students' Union building, officially named One Elmwood opened to students on 5 September 2022 and houses the Students' Union, Student Guidance Services, the Union bar, and Mandela Hall. It also houses a café called Social and a SPAR retail outlet under the name Union Shop.

==== Union services ====
The students' union provides services including an advice centre with full-time staff to help with issues such as money problems, accommodation and welfare. Commercial services including a shop, kitchen lounge area and coffee franchise are also provided by the union. The Mandela Hall hosts several concerts each year as well as the majority the students' union's club nights. Student Disability, Student Wellbeing, Student Finance, Careers, Learning Development service and other services are also provided.

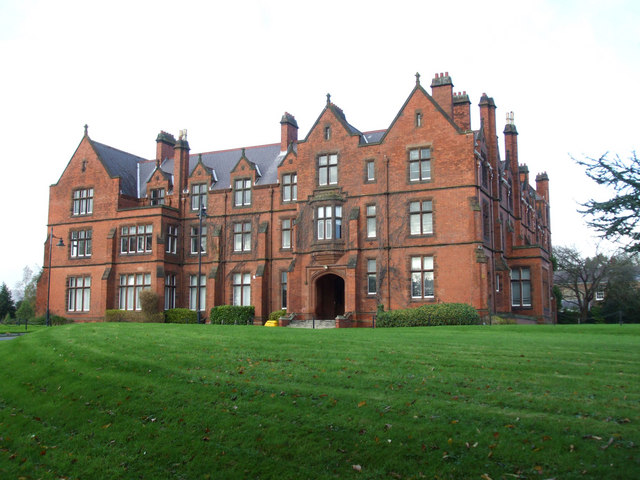
Riddel Hall

==== Clubs and societies ====
More than 50 sporting clubs and over 100 non-sporting societies are recognised by the Students' Union Council and are therefore eligible to apply for an annual grant from the university. The oldest society in Queen's University is the Literary and Scientific Society which focuses on debating political, cultural and social issues within Northern Ireland. Established in 1850 by Edwin Lawrence Godkin, the society has been very successful and produced some of the finest orators within Northern Ireland. The Dragonslayers Gaming Society hosts one of Ireland's largest games conventions, Q-Con, in June of each year, and cultural groups such as An Cumann Gaelach and the Ulster-Scots Society are also present. There are a number of international societies at Queen's, including the International Students Society and the Malaysian Students Society.

The Queen's University Mountaineering Club has produced three Everest summiteers including Ireland's first, Dawson Stelfox. Roger McMorrow and Nigel Hart also summited in May 2007, and were subsequently jointly announced Queen's University Graduates of the year for 2006/07 for their role in rescuing a young Nepalese climber left for dead near the summit.

QUB is one of only 20 universities in the United Kingdom to have an AIESEC local chapter, developing leadership, business and soft skills, as well as providing international opportunities through their work abroad program.

=== Housing ===
Queen's provides housing for both undergraduates and postgraduates, although many students live at home and commute. In 2005/06, 36% of Queen's students lived in private accommodation within Belfast, 29% lived with parents or guardians, 20% in private accommodation outside of Belfast, and 10% lived in university maintained accommodation. The university provides accommodation on a purpose-built student village called Elms Village located on the Malone Road, south of the main campus, as well as in a number of houses in the South Belfast area, including at College Gardens and on Mount Charles. The university also has two city centre based accommodations, Elms BT1 and Elms BT2 and Weavers Hall on Dublin Road due to open in 2026.

=== Cultural life ===
The university had hosted the annual Belfast Festival at Queen's since 1961 but announced in March 2015 that it would not continue to fund the festival.

It runs the successful Queen's Film Theatre, described as Northern Ireland's leading independent cinema, the Brian Friel Theatre and an art gallery, the Naughton Gallery at Queen's, which is a registered museum. In 2008 the Naughton Gallery was awarded the Times Higher Award for Excellence and Innovation in the Arts. Housed in the Lanyon building since 2001 is a marble statue by Pio Fedi of physicist Galileo, portrayed deep in thought.

The International Students Society holds the annual Culture Shock event at Whitla Hall. By holding performances from the student community, Queen's provides one of the largest showcases of international culture in Northern Ireland.

=== Sport ===
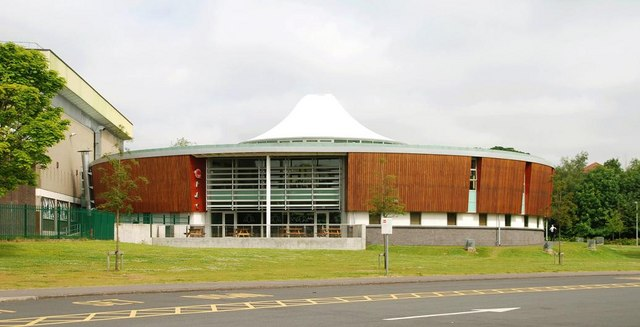
Queen's Physical Education Centre

Queen's participates in both British Universities and Colleges Sport (BUCS) competitions and events, as well as those of Student Sport Ireland.

The Queen's Physical Education Centre (abbreviated to and known widely as the PEC) is one of the largest sports centres in Ireland or the UK. This building houses many squash courts, several climbing walls and is home to QUB's senior men's and women's basketball teams.

The University Playing Fields, also known as Malone Playing Fields, is located just over 2 miles (3.2 km) from the main campus, comprising 17 pitches for rugby, association football, Gaelic football, hockey, hurling, camogie, and cricket. In addition, there are three netball courts, nine tennis courts, and an athletics arena where the Mary Peters Track is situated. The area and its surrounding forest of Barnetts Demesne are mapped for orienteering.

Queens Gaelic football team compete in the Sigerson Cup and have won the trophy on 8 occasions, with the last victory coming in the 1999/2000 academic year.

The university's association football team, Queen's University Belfast A.F.C., play in the Irish Second Division. Queen's snooker team have won the British intervarsity title on a record nine occasions and are the current champions.

Queen's University Belfast Boat Club is one of the most successful clubs in the university. The QUB boathouse, home of Queen's University Belfast Boat Club (QUBBC) and Queen's University of Belfast Ladies Boat Club (QUBLBC), is located on the River Lagan near Stranmillis. In 2010 they were reigning Irish Champions in men's Intermediate and Senior 8's. They are also reigning Irish University Champions in Men's Senior 8's, Women's Novice 8's and Women's Novice 4's. They are the only rowing club in Ireland to have a full-time rowing coach.

== Visual identity ==
The graphic identity, which includes the logotype, was originally created in 2000 by Lloyd Northover, the British design consultancy founded by John Lloyd and Jim Northover. It was most recently redesigned in October 2017 by Belfast-based brand consultancy, Mammoth, replacing the "Q" identity with an updated version of the university's crest.

== Publications ==
The Law School publishes the Northern Ireland Legal Quarterly (NILQ), a peer-reviewed quarterly journal published since 1936.

== Notable alumni and academics ==
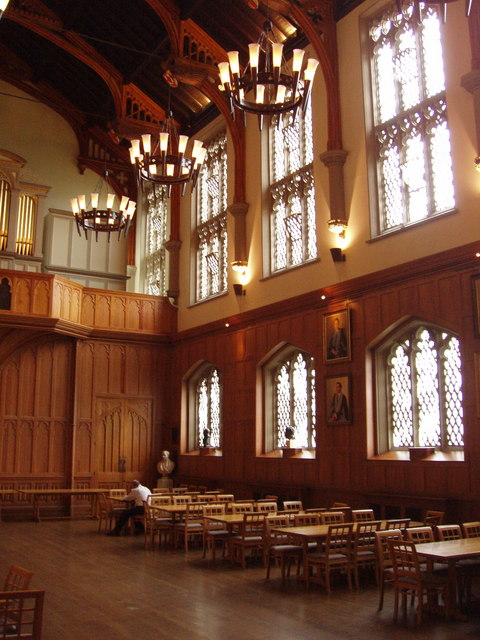
Great Hall

Queen's has many distinguished alumni, including former president of Ireland Mary McAleese; Nobel Prize winners poet Seamus Heaney and politician Lord Trimble; former Prime Minister of Northern Ireland Lord Faulkner of Downpatrick; Lords Chief Justice of Northern Ireland, Lord Hutton and Lord Kerr of Tonaghmore, justice of The Supreme Court of United Kingdom; former Speaker of the Northern Ireland Assembly Lord Alderdice and former and current Northern Ireland ministers Sir Reg Empey, Mark Durkan, Nigel Dodds and Conor Murphy, and former Irish Free State minister and prominent Sinn Féin member Eoin MacNeill. Other alumni include poet Paul Muldoon; actors Liam Neeson and Stephen Rea; comedian and presenter Patrick Kielty; novelists Patrick Hicks and Brian McGilloway; playwright and screenwriter Lisa McGee; broadcasters Nick Ross, Bernadette Collins and Annie Mac; journalist Chris Smith; scientists John Stewart Bell, Frank Pantridge and Thomas Henry Flewett. Other alumni include John Bodkin Adams, Trevor Ringland and David Cullen (2007 winners of the Arthur Ashe for Courage Award), David Case (Air Commodore, the highest ranking Black officer in the British Armed forces), Tim Collins (former commanding officer of the 1st Battalion, Royal Irish Regiment), Michael Farrell (an Irish civil rights activist, writer and former leader of People's Democracy), Drew Nelson former Grand Secretary of the Orange Order, Elizabeth Gould Bell, the first woman to practice medicine in Ulster and Peter Rice (structural engineer), structural engineer and recipient of the RIBA Gold Medal in 1988.

Notable academics who have worked at Queen's include Paul Bew, Baron Bew, Sir David Bates (physicist), Sir Bernard Crossland, Tony Hoare, Michael Mann, poet and critic Philip Hobsbaum, John H. Whyte and poet Philip Larkin was a sub-librarian at the university in the early 1950s.

Four alumni had long careers in East Asia. Sir Robert Hart was the Inspector-General of China's Imperial Maritime Customs for almost 50 years. Sir Hiram Shaw Wilkinson served in British Consular Service in China and Japan for 40 years retiring as Chief Justice of the British Supreme Court for China and Corea. Sir James Russell was Chief Justice of Hong Kong. John Carey Hall served in the British Japan Consular Service for more than 40 years, retiring as consul-general in Yokohama.

== Links with other universities ==
In 2014, Queen's announced the opening of China Medical University – Queen's University Belfast Joint College (CQC), a partnership between Queen's School of Pharmacy and China Medical University (CMU) in Shenyang, Liaoning Province. CMU, had a long-standing relationship with the Queen's University's School of Pharmacy at Queen's prior to the joint college. Queen's also has links with Shenzhen University, which began in 1998 and continues to prepare approximately 40 students per year for a degree at Queen's.

Queen's participates in the European Union's ERASMUS programme, allowing undergraduate students to study for a period at universities in Austria, Finland, Iceland, Portugal, Belgium, France, Italy, Slovakia, Bulgaria, Germany, the Netherlands, Spain, the Czech Republic, Greece, Norway, Sweden, Denmark, Hungary, Poland and Switzerland. Queen's is also part of the Utrecht Network which works towards the internationalisation of higher education. The university also has exchange programmes with Fordham University School of Law in New York, US, the University of Newcastle and the University of Tasmania in Australia, and two universities in Canada: Queen's University in Kingston, Ontario, and the University of Alberta in Edmonton, Alberta. Ching Yun University in Zhongli District, Taoyuan City, Taiwan, lists Queen's as a 'sister institution'. The university is also a member of the Top Industrial Managers for Europe (T.I.M.E.) Association.

Queen's takes part in the British Council's Business Education Initiative study-abroad scheme sending a number of undergraduate students to study business and related subjects at participating higher-education institutions in the United States.

Queen's is a member of Universities Ireland, an organisation that promotes collaboration and co-operation between universities in both the Republic of Ireland and Northern Ireland.

Member of University Defence Research Collaboration in Signal Processing

== See also ==
- Armorial of UK universities
- Belfast City Hospital
- Church of Ireland and Methodist Chaplaincy, Belfast
- Education in Northern Ireland
- List of modern universities in Europe (1801–1945)
- List of universities in the UK
- List of public art in Belfast
