= 1988 United States Senate election in Maine =

- November 8, 1988
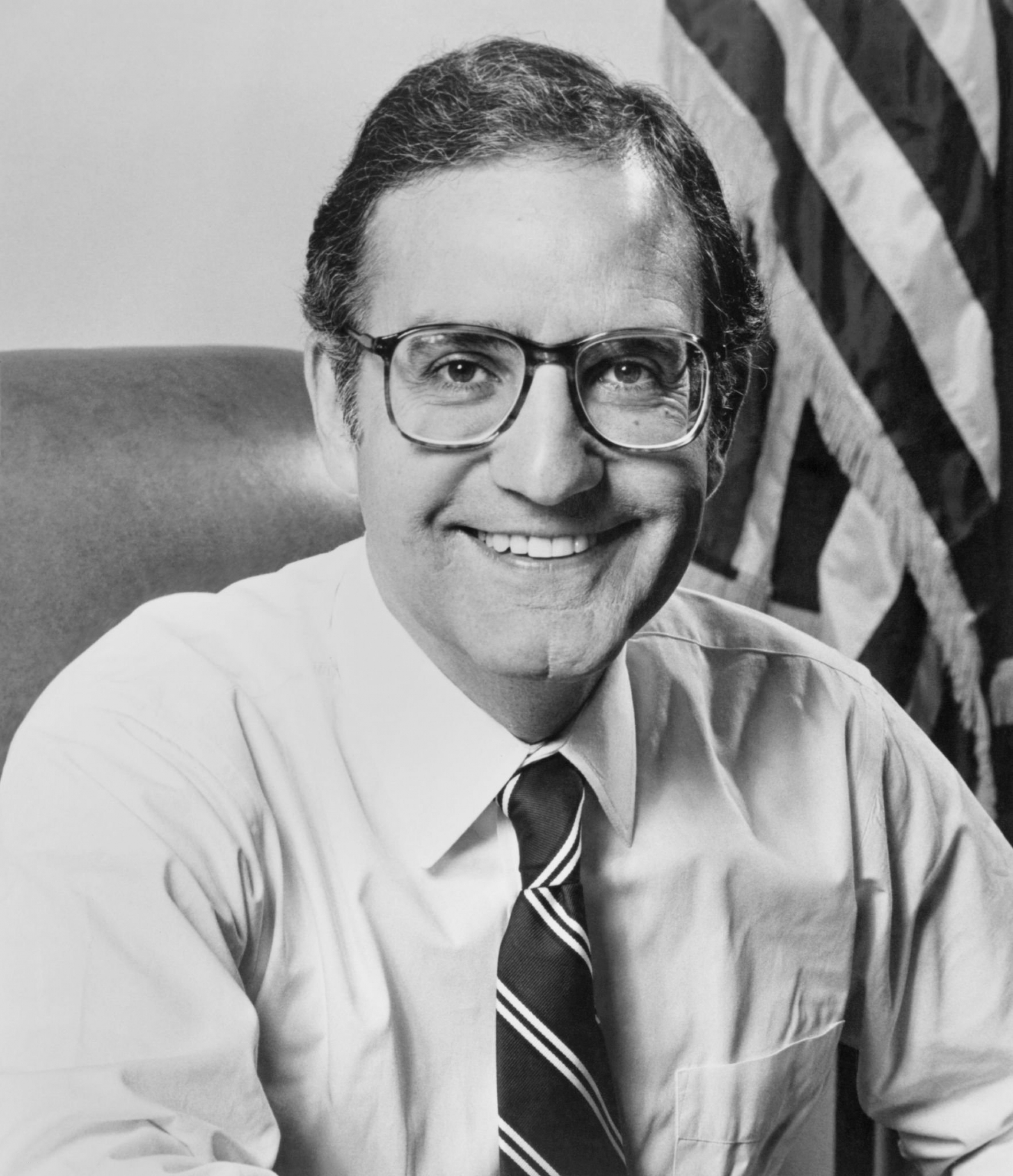

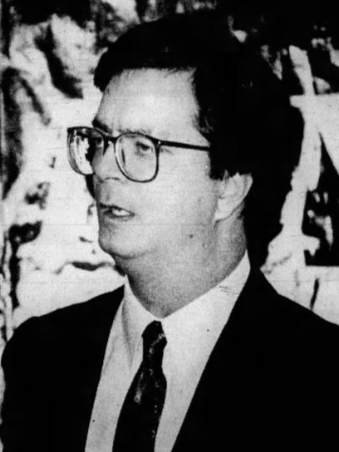
Nominee	George Mitchell	Jasper Wyman
Party	Democratic	Republican
Popular vote	452,581	104,164
Percentage	81.29%	18.71%
- Mitchell: 50–60% 60–70% 70–80% 80–90% >90% Wyman: 60–70% Tie: 50%
U.S. senator before election
George J. Mitchell
Democratic
Elected U.S. Senator
George J. Mitchell
Democratic

The 1988 United States Senate election in Maine was held on November 8, 1988. Incumbent Democratic U.S. Senator George J. Mitchell won re-election to a second full term in a landslide. This was the last time a Democrat won a U.S. Senate election in Maine until 2026. (Note: Angus King, who was elected in 2012 and re-elected in 2018 and 2024, is an independent who caucuses with the Democrats, but is not officially a member of the party.) Incumbent Vice President George H. W. Bush won the state in the concurrent presidential election.

== General election ==
=== Candidates ===
- George J. Mitchell, incumbent U.S. Senator since 1980 (Democratic)
- Jasper Wyman, leader of Maine Christian Civic League and businessman (Republican)

=== Results ===
Mitchell won an overwhelming landslide, carrying all but two municipalities in the state. Wyman would win only the town of Talmadge, 18 votes to Mitchell's 12, while the two candidates would tie in Hersey, 16–16.

General election results
Party	Candidate	Votes	%
Democratic	George J. Mitchell (incumbent)	452,581	81.29%
Republican	Jasper Wyman	104,164	18.71%
Total votes		556,745	100.00%
Democratic hold			

== See also ==
- 1988 United States Senate elections
