= Josias Leslie Porter =

Irish Presbyterian minister, missionary and traveller (1823–1889)

The Reverend Josias Leslie Porter
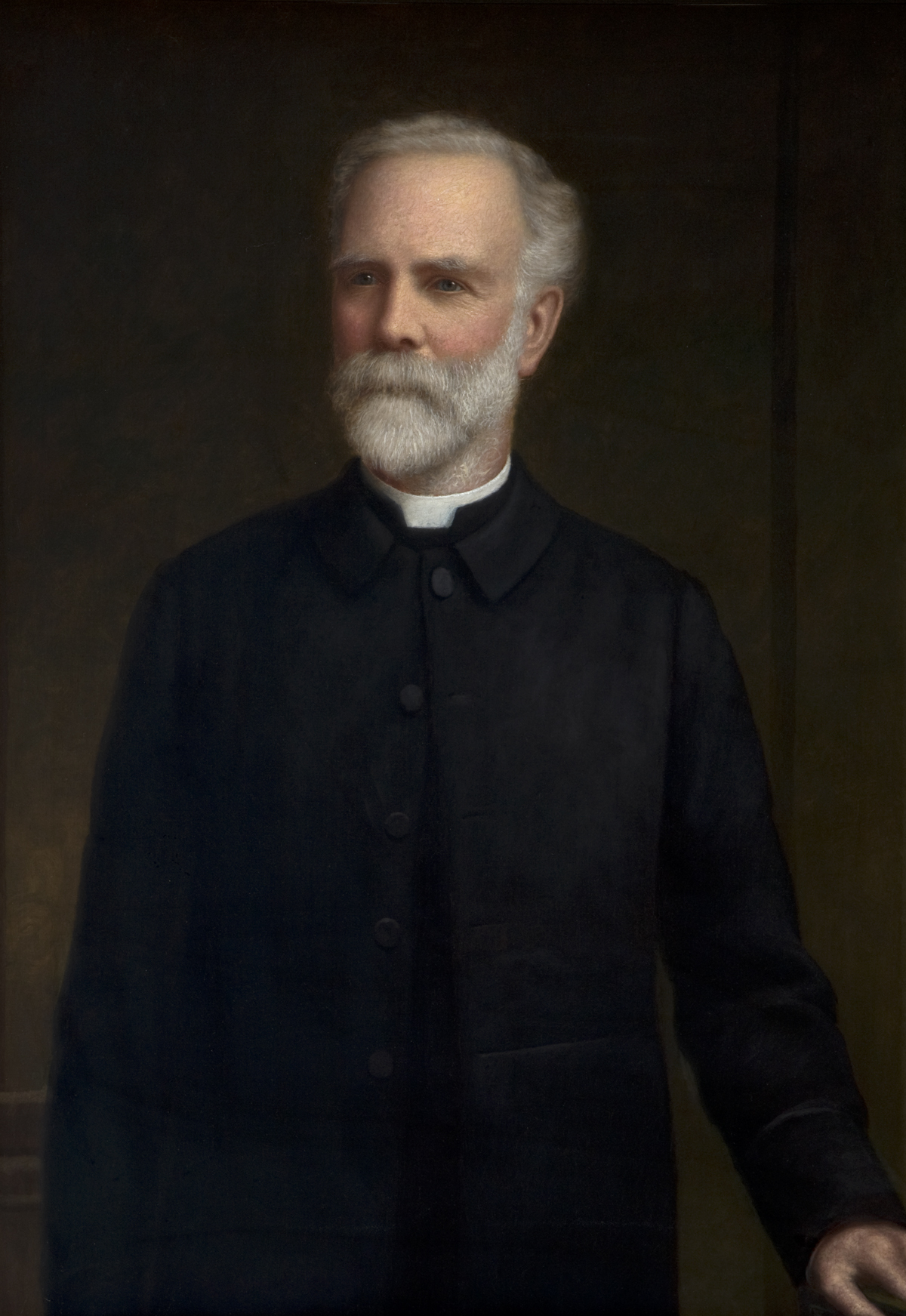

2nd President of Queen's College, Belfast
- In office 1879–1889
- Preceded by: Pooley Shuldman Henry
- Succeeded by: Thomas Hamilton

Personal details
- Born: Josias Leslie Porter; 4 October 1823 Burt, Ireland
- Died: 16 March 1889 (aged 65) Belfast, Ireland
- Resting place: Balmoral Cemetery, Belfast
- Citizenship: British
- Spouse: Margaret Rainey Cooke (m. 1849)
- Relations: Henry Cooke (father-in-law)
- Children: 4
- Parent(s): William Porter; Margaret Leslie
- Education: Royal University of Ireland (DLit); University of Edinburgh (DD); University of Glasgow (BA, MA, LLD)
- Occupation: Presbyterian Minister; Academic

Josias Leslie Porter (4 October 1823 – 16 March 1889) was an Irish Presbyterian minister, missionary and traveller, who became an academic administrator. He was Moderator of the Irish General Assembly in 1875.

== Early life ==
Born on 4 October 1823, he was youngest son of William Porter of Carrowan, parish of Burt, County Donegal, a farmer, and Margaret, daughter of Andrew Leslie of Drumgowan in the same parish. After being educated privately, between 1835 and 1838, by Samuel Craig, presbyterian minister of Crossroads, County Londonderry, and then at a school in Derry, he matriculated in the University of Glasgow in 1839, with a view to entering the ministry of the Irish presbyterian church. He graduated B.A. in 1841, and M.A. in 1842. In November 1842, he went to the university of Edinburgh, where he studied theology under Thomas Chalmers, continuing also to the Divinity Hall of the Free Church of Scotland, again to study under Chalmers.

== Minister and missionary ==
Porter was licensed to preach by the presbytery of Derry on 20 November 1844. He was ordained on 25 February 1846, and until 1849 was minister of the presbyterian congregation of High Bridge, Newcastle-on-Tyne. He was then sent to Damascus as a missionary to the Jews by the board of missions of the Irish Presbyterian Church. He reached Syria in December 1849, and remained there for ten years.

== Later life ==
In 1859, Porter returned home on furlough, and in July 1860 was appointed professor of biblical criticism in Assembly's College, Belfast, in succession to Robert Wilson. In 1864, he received the degrees of LL.D. from Glasgow and D.D. from Edinburgh. In 1867, on the death of Professor William Gibson, he became secretary of the college faculty at Belfast, and was an effective fundraiser. Porter, from the time of his appointment as professor, took a leading part in the work of the church courts, and in 1875 was elected Moderator of the General Assembly. During his tenure of the office he initiated a fund which provided manses for many congregations.

In 1878, Porter was appointed by government one of the two assistant-commissioners of the newly established board of intermediate education for Ireland. He resigned his professorship, moved to Dublin, and helped to organise the new scheme. In 1879, he was nominated president of Queen's College, Belfast. In virtue of his office he became a member of the senate of the newly created Royal University of Ireland, which in 1881 conferred on him the degree of D. Lit.

Porter died at Belfast on 16 March 1889, and was buried in Balmoral Cemetery.

== Works ==
In 1855, Porter published his first book on the Middle East, Five Years in Damascus, in which he related his life there, and journeys to destinations in the Ottoman Empire, including Palmyra, the Hauran, and Lebanon. The plans and woodcuts were engraved from his drawings. In 1858 he published his Handbook for Travellers in Syria and Palestine, in Murray's series. A second edition, largely rewritten, appeared in 1875, Porter having revisited the country and made further tours.

Other works by Porter were:

- The Pentateuch and the Gospels, which appeared in 1864 during the Colenso controversy.
- The Giant Cities of Bashan and Syria's Holy Places, 1865, several times republished. In this work he maintained that the massive buildings, the ruins of which are in Bashan, were the work of the aboriginal inhabitants of the country before its occupation by the Hebrews.
- The Life and Times of Dr. Cooke (his father-in-law), 1871; four editions.
- Jerusalem, Bethlehem, and Bethany, 1887.
- Galilee and the Jordan, 1885.

Porter also published a Pew and Study Bible in 1876. He contributed extensively to the edition of John Kitto's Cyclopædia of Biblical Literature which was begun in 1862; nearly all the geographical articles on places in Palestine were by him. He also wrote for Smith's Dictionary of the Bible, the Encyclopædia Britannica, and Kitto's Pictorial Bible; and contributed to the Bibliotheca Sacra (New York), to Kitto's Journal of Sacred Literature, and to other periodicals. Many of Porter's letters, addressed to the Rev. David Hamilton, honorary secretary of the Irish Presbyterian Jewish Mission, were printed in the pages of the Missionary Herald.

== Family ==
In 1849, just before going to Damascus, he married Margaret Rainey Cooke, youngest daughter of Henry Cooke of Belfast. Two sons and two daughters of the marriage survived him.

== Notes ==
Attribution

This article incorporates text from a publication now in the public domain: Lee, Sidney, ed. (1896). "Porter, Josias Leslie". Dictionary of National Biography. Vol. 46. London: Smith, Elder & Co.

Academic offices
Preceded by Robert Wilson	Professor of Biblical Criticism of the Presbyterian Church in Ireland; 1860–1878	Succeeded by Matthew Leitch
Preceded by Rev. Pooley Shuldman Henry	President of Queen's College, Belfast; 1879–1889	Succeeded by Rev. Thomas Hamilton
Presbyterian Church titles
Preceded by William Magill (1874)	Moderator of the Presbyterian Church in Ireland; 1875	Succeeded by John Meneely (1876)
