= Thomas J. Moran (businessman) =

Former American Businessman and Philanthropist

Thomas Moran

10th Chancellor of Queen's University Belfast
- In office April 26, 2015 – August 12, 2018
- Preceded by: Kamalesh Sharma
- Succeeded by: Hillary Clinton

Personal details
- Born: October 14, 1952 Staten Island, New York, U.S.
- Died: August 12, 2018 (aged 65) New York City, New York, U.S.
- Spouse: Joan
- Education: Manhattan College

Thomas J. Moran (October 14, 1952 – August 12, 2018) was an American businessman, philanthropist, academic administrator, and humanitarian. At the time of his death, he was chairman emeritus of Mutual of America and the chancellor of Queen's University Belfast.

== Early life and education ==
Moran was born on Staten Island to Lillian Moran (née Quaranta) and John Moran, and attended St. Joseph Hill Academy and graduated from Monsignor Farrell High School.

Moran graduated from Manhattan College with a Bachelor of Science in mathematics in 1974. He received an honorary Doctor of Humane Letters from Manhattan College in 2017. Moran also received an honorary Doctor of Laws degree from the College of Mount Saint Vincent and an honorary Doctor of Humane Letters from Mount Mary College. He was awarded an honorary Doctor of Laws from National University of Ireland, and an honorary Doctor of Science in economics from Queen's University Belfast.

== Career ==
Moran began his career with Mutual of America in 1975, and became the first President to be appointed from within the company in 1994. In October 1995, he was appointed Chief Executive Officer and remained in this role for 21 years, before retiring in April 2016. He was appointed Chairman of the Board in June 2005, a position he held until he retired in May 2018. Moran was instrumental in the company's growth to a financially strong mutual life insurance company with over $20 billion in assets.

Moran served in several insurance industry leadership positions, including his service as Chairman of the Life Insurance Council of New York and Chairman of the MIB Group. He was an advisory board member to the "Observatory on Europe 2007", improving European competitiveness and integration. Moran presented at the World Economic Forum in Davos and at the Petra Conference of Nobel Laureates. He also served on the board of directors of the Bank of Ireland and Aer Lingus.

Moran also served on many not-for-profit boards, including the board of the New York Catholic Foundation, the Alfred E. Smith Memorial Foundation, American Cancer Society, the Greater New York Councils of the Boy Scouts, the Viscardi Center, WNET, Manhattan College, the National Committee on American Foreign Policy, the Irish Hunger Memorial, and as chairman of the board of Concern Worldwide. Moran was also the chairman of the North American advisory board of the Michael Smurfit Graduate Business School.

In recognition of his business success and commitment to caring, Moran received numerous awards, including the Calvary Hospital Medal of Honor, the St. Elizabeth Seton Award from the National Catholic Education Association, the Terence Cardinal Cooke Medal, the New York City Fire Department Humanitarian Award, the commissioner's Award by the New York City Police Foundation, the Pierre Toussaint Medallion Honor, and the Ellis Island Medal of Honor. For his support of the international relief organization, Concern Worldwide, Moran was recognized by the prime minister of Ireland, who commented that "his selfless actions have improved the lives of thousands." In 2015, Moran received the Irish Presidential Service Award. He was singled out as a humanitarian, philanthropist and influential voice in the Irish peace process, who consistently championed reconciliation.

After Moran's death in 2018, former Secretary of State and 2016 Democratic presidential nominee, Hillary Clinton, was selected to succeed him as chancellor of Queen's University Belfast. She officially took office in January 2020. In April, 2023, Queen’s University Belfast named its Graduate School The Thomas J. Moran Graduate School in Moran’s honor.

== Personal life ==
Moran lived in New York City and Spring Lake, New Jersey, with Joan, his wife of over 35 years. Moran died in New York, with Joan at his side, after suffering from a short illness. He was 65. A Mass of Christian Burial was offered for Moran at Saint Patrick's Cathedral, with Timothy Michael Cardinal Dolan, Archbishop of New York, and a personal friend of Tom's, serving as officiant.
