= David Orr (businessman) =

Sir David Orr MC*

7th Chancellor of the Queen's University, Belfast
- In office 1992–1998
- Preceded by: Sir Rowland Wright
- Succeeded by: George J. Mitchell

Personal details
- Born: 10 May 1922 Dalkey, County Dublin, Ireland
- Died: 2 February 2008 (aged 85)
- Spouse: Phoebe Davis (m. 1949)
- Children: 3
- Education: Trinity College, Dublin

Military service
- Branch/service: Royal Ulster Rifles
- Years of service: 1941-1945

Sir David Alexander Orr MC* (10 May 1922 in Dalkey, County Dublin – 2 February 2008) was an Anglo-Irish businessman, philanthropist and World War II veteran.

== Early years ==
Orr was born the third of four children to Canon A.W.F. Orr, an Anglican rector at Canon of Christ Church Cathedral. David Orr attended The High School, Dublin and went on to study Classics at Trinity College, Dublin, where he was a boxer and captain of rugby.

== World War II ==
In 1941, he left school to enlist in the Royal Ulster Rifles and was commissioned into the Royal Engineers, serving with Queen Victoria's Own Madras Sappers and Miners during the reconquest of Burma in 1944-45. He was awarded two Military Crosses.

== Unilever ==
After the war, Orr returned to Trinity to complete a degree in Law. He joined Unilever as a graduate trainee. From 1955 to 1966 he was posted to Unilever's India subsidiary, Hindustan Lever. He returned to London before moving to New York to become president of Lever Bros in 1965. He retired in 1982.

== Inchcape ==
Orr later became chairman of Inchcape, a trading group. He also sat on the boards of RTZ and Shell Transport & Trading. From 1983-89, Orr was a member of the court of the Bank of Ireland.

== Top Salaries Review ==
He was a member of Harold Wilson's "committee to review the functioning of financial institutions" (1977–80). Later he served on the Top Salaries Review Body (civil service) and the Armed Forces' Pay Review Body, negotiating directly with then Prime Minister Margaret Thatcher.

== Globe Theatre ==
In 1982, Orr had also been asked to help rebuild the Globe Theatre. As chairman of the Globe Theatre Trust he had been a brilliant fundraiser. The building was finally completed in 1997.

== Honours ==
Orr was knighted in 1977. In 1979, he was appointed a Commander of the Dutch Order of Orange Nassau.

== Affiliations ==
- Chancellor of Queen's University, Belfast
- President, Liverpool School of Tropical Medicine
- President, College of Speech Therapists
- Governor, London School of Economics.
- Chairman, British Council (1985–92)
- Joint Chair, Anglo-Irish Encounter

== Sports ==
A boxer and rugby player, in London he played rugby centre for London Irish, captaining the club in 1951-52; he also had a trial for Ireland.

== Personal life ==
In 1949, he married Phoebe Davis, with whom he had three daughters, all of whom survive Orr, who died in 2008, aged 85, from undisclosed causes.

Academic offices
Preceded by Sir Rowland Wright	Chancellor of Queen's University Belfast; 1992–1998	Succeeded by Senator George Mitchell
