= Eric Ashby, Baron Ashby =

British botanist and educator (1904–1992)

The Right Honourable The Lord Ashby FRS
- Ashby in June 1958.

Member of the House of Lords Lord Temporal
- In office 6 July 1973 – 22 October 1992; Life Peerage

5th Chancellor of the Queen's University Belfast
- In office 1970–1983
- Preceded by: Sir Tyrone Guthrie
- Succeeded by: Sir Rowland Wright

Personal details
- Born: Eric Ashby; 24 August 1904 Leytonstone, Essex, England
- Died: 22 October 1992 (aged 88)
- Spouse: Elizabeth Helen Margaret Farries
- Education: City of London School; Royal College of Science

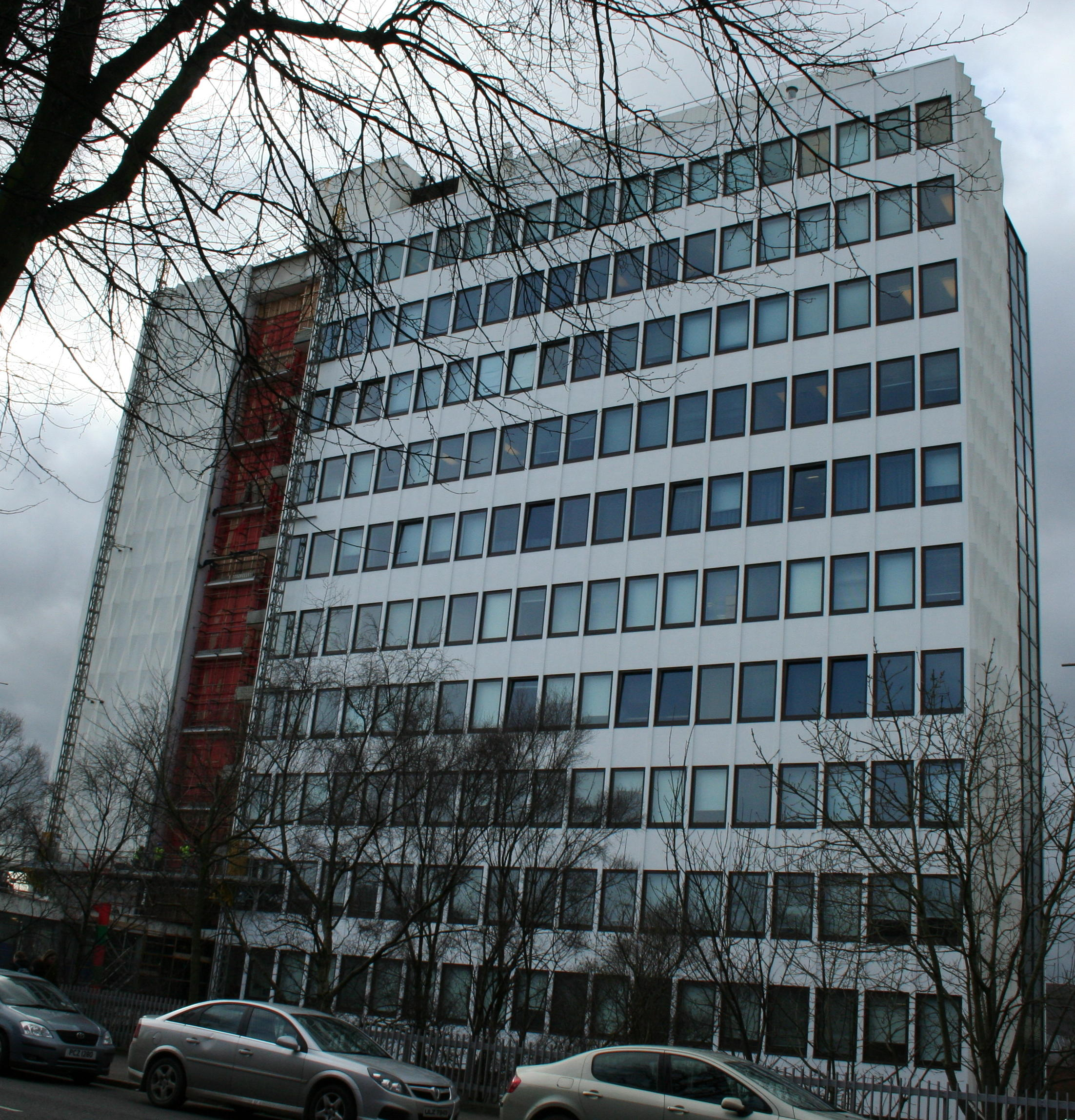
The Ashby Building, Queen's University Belfast

Eric Ashby, Baron Ashby, FRS (24 August 1904 – 22 October 1992) was a British botanist and educator.

== Education ==
Born in Leytonstone in Essex, he was educated at the City of London School and the Royal College of Science, where he graduated with a Bachelor of Science. He was then demonstrator at the Imperial College from 1926 to 1929. In 1929, he received a Harkness Fellowship to the University of Chicago. Ashby was a lecturer at Imperial College from 1931 to 1935, and at the University of Bristol from 1935 to 1938.

== Marriage ==
Ashby married Elizabeth Helen Margaret Farries, whom he met while they were working together on incineration techniques for measuring carbon in tissue at Imperial College. They had two children, Michael and Peter.

Helen (born 1902, Risk, Kirkcudbright) studied at Auchencruive agricultural college and the University of Glasgow before progressing to Imperial College.

== Career ==
In 1938, Ashby became professor of botany at the University of Sydney, a post he held until 1946. Between 1944 and 1945, he was Scientific Counsellor to Moscow. From 1947 to 1950, he held the Harrison Chair of Botany at the University of Manchester. According to Burges and Eden"His enthusiasm and flair for botany made Manchester one of the leading botanical schools in the United Kingdom".

From 1950 to 1959 he was president and vice-chancellor of Queen's University, Belfast. For the University of Cambridge, he was Master of Clare College, Cambridge from 1959 to 1975, and vice-chancellor from 1967 to 1969. From 1968 to 1974 he was Chairman of the Governors at Culford School; and between 1970 and 1973, he was chair of the Royal Commission on Environmental Pollution. Ashby was knighted in 1956, and was created a life peer as Baron Ashby, of Brandon in the County of Suffolk on 6 July 1973.

Ashby was secretary of the Society for Experimental Biology from 1935 to 1938 and president of the British Association for the Advancement of Science from 1962 to 1963. He was elected a Foreign Honorary Member of the American Academy of Arts and Sciences in 1961.

In 1968, he received the Centenary Medal of the Royal Society of Tasmania and in 1973, he became president and chancellor of the Queen's University, Belfast. He was adviser to the British National Fruit Traders Association and a Fellow of the Royal Society (FRS). He was awarded an Honorary Degree (Doctor of Science) by the University of Bath in 1966.

== See also ==
- List of Old Citizens

Academic offices
| Preceded by Sir David Lindsay Keir | President and Vice-Chancellor of Queen's University Belfast; 1950–1959 | Succeeded by Dr Michael Grant |
| Preceded by Henry Thirkill | Master of Clare College, Cambridge; 1958–1975 | Succeeded by Robert Charles Oliver Matthews |
| Preceded by Arthur Armitage | Vice-Chancellor of the University of Cambridge; 1967–1969 | Succeeded by Owen Chadwick |
| Preceded by Sir Tyrone Guthrie | Chancellor of Queen's University Belfast; 1970–1983 | Succeeded by Sir Rowland Wright |
