= Kamalesh Sharma =

Indian diplomat (born 1941)

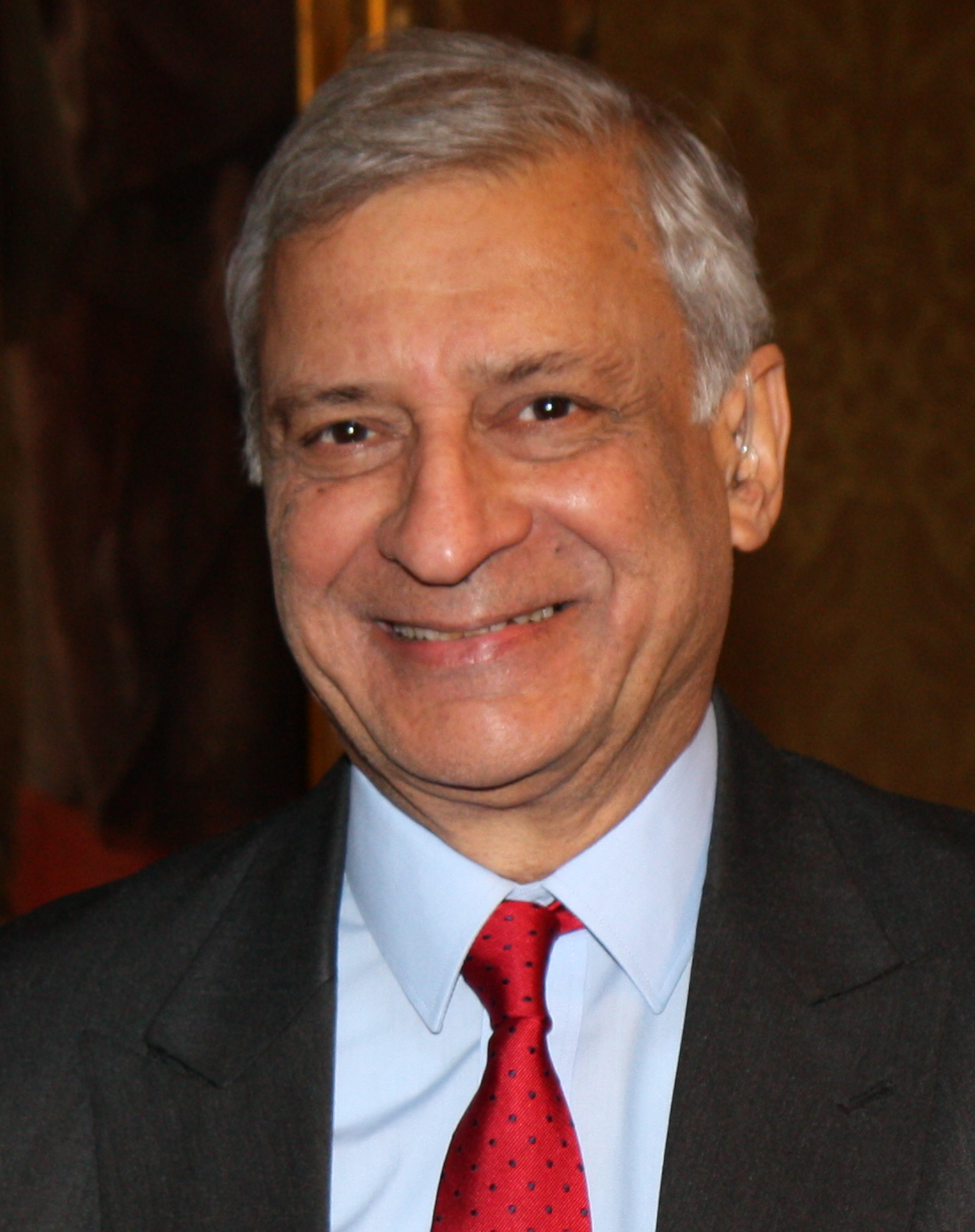
- Sharma in 2015

5th Secretary-General of the Commonwealth of Nations
- In office 1 April 2008 – 31 March 2016
- Head: Elizabeth II
- Chair: See list: Yoweri Museveni (Uganda) Patrick Manning (Trinidad & Tobago) Kamla Persad-Bissessar (Trinidad & Tobago) Julia Gillard (Australia) Kevin Rudd (Australia) Tony Abbott (Australia) Mahinda Rajapaksa (Sri Lanka) Maithripala Sirisena (Sri Lanka) Joseph Muscat (Malta)
- Preceded by: Don McKinnon
- Succeeded by: The Baroness Scotland of Asthal

9th Chancellor of Queen's University Belfast
- In office 10 December 2009 – 25 April 2015
- Preceded by: George J. Mitchell
- Succeeded by: Thomas J. Moran

Permanent Representative of India to the United Nations
- In office 7 August 1997 – 27 May 2002
- Secretary General: Kofi Annan
- President: Kocheril Raman Narayanan
- Preceded by: Prakash Shah
- Succeeded by: Vijay K. Nambiar

Personal details
- Born: 30 September 1941 (age 85) Benares, Benares State, British India (present-day Varanasi, Uttar Pradesh, India)
- Children: 2
- Education: St. Stephen's College, Delhi; Delhi University; King's College, Cambridge; Cambridge University
- Profession: Diplomat

Kamalesh Sharma, GCVO (born 30 September 1941) is a retired Indian diplomat who served as the fifth secretary-general of the Commonwealth of Nations from 2008 to 2016. Previously, he was the High Commissioner of India to the United Kingdom from 2004 to 2008. In addition, he is the Chancellor Emeritus of Queen's University Belfast.

== Education ==
Sharma is an alumnus of the Modern School on Barakhamba Road in New Delhi, St. Stephen's College in Delhi and King's College, Cambridge.

== Career ==
Sharma was an officer in the Indian Foreign Service from 1965 to 2002. He served as India's Permanent Representative to the United Nations from August 1997 to May 2002, before his retirement from the Indian Foreign Service.

From 2002 to 2004, he was the UN Secretary General's special representative to East Timor. He subsequently served as High Commissioner of India to the United Kingdom from 2004 to 2008.

He is a Vice-President of the Royal Commonwealth Society. He was also the Chancellor of Queen's University Belfast from 2009 to 2015.

== Commonwealth Secretary-General ==
Sharma was elected to the position of secretary-general over Michael Frendo, foreign minister of Malta, during the biennial Commonwealth summit in Kampala, Uganda, held from 22 to 24 November 2007. He took over from Sir Don McKinnon of New Zealand on 1 April 2008.

Sharma was re-elected on 30 October 2011 at the 2011 CHOGM. He was unopposed, having been proposed by India and seconded by Pakistan. His second and final four-year term began on 1 April 2012 and ended on 31 March 2016.

Sharma has been criticised as a "decent but ineffective" Secretary-General by Hugh Segal, Canada's former special envoy to the Commonwealth, who commented that under Sharma's tenure, the organization has been "missing in action on Sri Lankan human rights, vicious anti-gay laws in some parts of Africa and continued weakness in the promotion of judicial independence and democracy."

Geoffrey Robertson QC described Sharma's tenure in the following terms: "...for eight years before 2016 it was led by an Indian diplomat who would not have known a human right if he fell over it.

Sharma responded to such criticism stating: "The most important point about the Commonwealth is that it engages with member states to advance the values template. I made five visits to Sri Lanka, but you can't keep on talking about it in public for the reason that work has to be done below the radar to carry political conviction."

During his eight-year tenure as Commonwealth Secretary-General, Sharma focused on the empowerment of young people, the advancement of women's political and economic rights and raising international awareness of challenges facing small states as pressing priorities.

Sharma was described by Arif Zaman, Executive Director of the Commonwealth Businesswomen's Network as "someone who has been a passionate, active and dedicated champion for women, combining advocacy with practical steps".

On Sharma's tenure, The Rt Hon Hugo Swire, UK Minister of State, Foreign and Commonwealth Office commented that Sharma "helped to guide the Commonwealth through a period of significant challenges and he can be rightly proud of the important developments that have taken place under his leadership, such as the introduction of the Commonwealth Charter".

At the opening ceremony of the Commonwealth Heads of Government Meeting in Malta, 27 November 2015, Joseph Muscat, Prime Minister of Malta stated that Sharma had "done a very good job at providing leadership and introducing new initiatives during his tenure." He gave thanks to Sharma "for his unflinching commitment to the Commonwealth", adding that "his legacy will undoubtedly be a positive one".

== Chancellor of Queen's University Belfast ==
On 9 July 2009, Sharma was appointed Chancellor of Queen's University Belfast after the retirement of Senator George J. Mitchell.

Queen's says, he was responsible for cementing relations between Northern Ireland and India, which led to the country's investment in Northern Ireland businesses.

The position is a largely honorary title and Sharma said he was enormously proud to be given the job at Queen's.

Positions in intergovernmental organisations
Preceded by Sir Don McKinnon	Secretary-General of the Commonwealth of Nations; 2008–2016	Succeeded by The Baroness Scotland of Asthal
Academic offices
Preceded by Senator George Mitchell	Chancellor of Queen's University Belfast; 2009–2015	Succeeded by Thomas Moran
