= List of chancellors of the Queen's University Belfast =

The chancellor of Queen's University Belfast, and the president of its predecessor institution, Queen's College, Belfast, is the ceremonial head of the university.

== List ==
Portrait	Chancellor (Birth–Death)	Term	Country	Line	Ref(s).
President of Queen's College, Belfast
	Reverend; Pooley Shuldman Henry (1801–1881)	1845 – 1879	United Kingdom	Clergyman; Academic	
	Reverend; Josias Leslie Porter (1823–1889)	1879 – 1889	United Kingdom	Minister; Academic	
	Reverend; Thomas Hamilton (1842–1926)	1889 – 1908	United Kingdom	Clergyman; Academic	
Chancellor of Queen's University, Belfast
	The 9th Earl of Shaftesbury (1869–1961)	1908 – 1923	United Kingdom (England)	Military Officer; Aristocrat	
	The 7th Marquess of Londonderry (1878–1949)	1923 – 1949	United Kingdom	Aristocrat; Politician	
	Field Marshal; The 1st Viscount Alanbrooke (1883–1963)	1949 – 1963	United Kingdom – France	Military Officer	
	Sir Tyrone Guthrie (1900–1971)	1963 – 1970	United Kingdom	Theatrical Director	
	The Baron Ashby (1904–1992)	1970 – 1983	United Kingdom (England)	Botanist	
	Sir Rowland Wright (1915–1991)	1984 – 1991	United Kingdom (England)	Industrialist	
	Sir David Orr (1922–2008)	1992 – 1998	United Kingdom – Republic of Ireland	Businessman; Philanthropist	
	George J. Mitchell (b. 1933)	1999 – 2009	United States	Politician; Diplomat	
	Kamalesh Sharma (b. 1941)	2009 – 2015	British Raj – India	Diplomat	
	Thomas J. Moran (1952–2018)	2015 – 2018	United States	Businessman; Academic Administrator	
	Hillary Clinton (b. 1947)	2020 – Incumbent	United States	Politician; Diplomat; Lawyer; Writer	

== See also ==
- List of vice-chancellors of Queen's University Belfast
- Chancellors of the Royal University of Ireland
