= Pooley Shuldman Henry =

British-Irish Clergyman (1801–1881)

Rev. Pooley Shuldman Henry (1801–1881) was a British-Irish clergyman and academic. He was an ordained Presbyterian minister and was Chancellor of the Queen's University, Belfast, then called Queen's College between 1845–1879. He was the first to hold the role.

Academic offices
New title	President of Queen's College, Belfast; 1845–1879	Succeeded by Rev. Josias Leslie Porter
