= Rowland Wright =

British industrialist (1915–1991)

Sir Rowland Wright CBE

6th Chancellor of the Queen's University, Belfast
- In office 1984–1991
- Preceded by: Lord Ashby of Brandon
- Succeeded by: Sir David Orr

Personal details
- Born: 4 October 1915 Northampton, England
- Died: 14 June 1991 (aged 75) Newick, East Sussex, England

Sir Rowland Sydney Wright CBE (4 October 1915 – 14 June 1991) was a British industrialist who served as Chancellor of the Queen's University, Belfast between 1984–91.

He was born in Northampton. He was appointed a Commander of the Order of the British Empire (CBE) in the 1970 New Year Honours. He was knighted in the 1976 Birthday Honours for his service to export as Chairman of Imperial Chemical Industries.

He died in Newick, East Sussex, aged 75.
