= Mitchell Report (Arab–Israeli conflict) =

2001 document

The Mitchell Report, officially the Sharm el-Sheikh Fact-Finding Committee Report, is a report that was created by an international fact-finding committee, led by former US Senator George Mitchell. The report describes possible causes of the al-Aqsa Intifada, and gives recommendations to end the violence, rebuild confidence and resume negotiations. It was published on 30 April 2001.

== Background ==
At an Emergency Summit on 17 October 2000, the parties decided to establish a fact-finding committee, which would investigate the causes of the Second Intifada, to pave the way back to negotiations.

== Content of the report ==
=== Link with violence ===
According to the Mitchell Report, the government of Israel asserted that

the immediate catalyst for the violence was the breakdown of the Camp David negotiations on 25 July 2000 and the "widespread appreciation in the international community of Palestinian responsibility for the impasse." In this view, Palestinian violence was planned by the PA leadership, and was aimed at "provoking and incurring Palestinian casualties as a means of regaining the diplomatic initiative."

The Palestine Liberation Organization, according to the same report, denied that the Intifada was planned, and asserted that "Camp David represented nothing less than an attempt by Israel to extend the force it exercises on the ground to negotiations."

The report also stated:

From the perspective of the PLO, Israel responded to the disturbances with excessive and illegal use of deadly force against demonstrators; behavior which, in the PLO's view, reflected Israel's contempt for the lives and safety of Palestinians. For Palestinians, the widely seen images of Muhammad al-Durrah in Gaza on September 30, shot as he huddled behind his father, reinforced that perception.

Mitchell concluded,

We have no basis on which to conclude that there was a deliberate plan by the PA to initiate a campaign of violence at the first opportunity; or to conclude that there was a deliberate plan by the [Government of Israel] to respond with lethal force.

However, there is also no evidence on which to conclude that the PA made a consistent effort to contain the demonstrations and control the violence once it began; or that the [Government of Israel] made a consistent effort to use non-lethal means to control demonstrations of unarmed Palestinians. Amid rising anger, fear, and mistrust, each side assumed the worst about the other and acted accordingly.

The Sharon visit did not cause the "Al-Aqsa Intifada." But it was poorly timed and the provocative effect should have been foreseen; indeed it was foreseen by those who urged that the visit be prohibited. More significant were the events that followed: the decision of the Israeli police on September 29 to use lethal means against the Palestinian demonstrators; and the subsequent failure, as noted above, of either party to exercise restraint.

=== Recommendations ===
In order to get the Israeli–Palestinian peace process back on track after the failure of the Camp David 2000 Summit,

the committee called for action in three phases: 1) an immediate cessation of all violence, 2) rebuilding confidence by a full-scale effort by the Palestinian Authority to prevent Terrorism, the freezing of Israeli settlement activity ... and other confidence-building measures, and 3) resumption of negotiations. Although the Israeli government and the Palestinian Authority accepted the report's conclusions, with some reservations, they failed to implement the findings

Israeli leader Ariel Sharon rejected Israel's main requirement of a settlement freeze by arguing that families already living in settlements will increase in size. Sharon rhetorically asked: "Let's assume that a family is going to have a baby ... What should they do, abortion?"
