= Thomas Hamilton (university administrator) =

Irish clergyman and academic

The Right Honourable and Reverend Thomas Hamilton

Vice-Chancellor of the Queen's University of Belfast
- In office 1908–1923

President of Queen's College, Belfast
- In office 1889–1908

Personal details
- Born: 28 August 1842 Belfast, Ireland
- Died: 18 May 1926 (aged 83)
- Occupation: Presbyterian minister

Thomas Hamilton PC (Ire) (28 August 1842 – 18 May 1926) was an Irish clergyman and academic who served as president of Queen's College, Belfast and subsequently Vice-Chancellor of the Queen's University of Belfast after its creation in 1908.

A native of Belfast, Hamilton was educated at the Royal Belfast Academical Institution, Queen's College, Belfast and Queen's University of Ireland. He became president of Queens College, Belfast in 1889 and, after nineteen years in that position, was appointed to the office of vice-chancellor when the expanded institution was granted university status. He served in this post for another fifteen years, until 1923. He was also the author of a number of historical and ecclesiastical studies, including the 1886 History of the Irish Presbyterian Church, and wrote myriad entries for the Dictionary of National Biography. As a prominent unionist, he was appointed, at the age of 78, to the Privy Council of Ireland in the 1921 New Year Honours, entitling him to the style "The Right Honourable".

He was awarded an honorary Doctor of Divinity degree by the University of Aberdeen, and an honorary Doctor of Laws degree by the Royal University of Ireland, of which he had been a Senator for many years.

In 1876, Hamilton married Frances Allen (died 4 May 1925) and was the father of a son and two daughters. He died in Belfast at the age of 83.

Academic offices
Preceded by Rev. Josias Leslie Porter	President of Queen's College, Belfast; 1889–1908	Office abolished
New office	President and Vice-Chancellor of Queen's University Belfast; 1908–1923	Succeeded by Sir Richard Winn Livingstone
