= Hersey, Maine =

Town in Maine, United States

- Town
- Location of Hersey, Maine
- Coordinates: 46°04′49″N 68°23′15″W
- Country: United States
- State: Maine
- County: Aroostook

Area
  - Total: 39.86 sq mi (103.24 km^{2})
  - Land: 39.65 sq mi (102.69 km^{2})
  - Water: 0.21 sq mi (0.54 km^{2})
- Elevation: 696 ft (212 m)

Population (2020)
  - Total: 73
  - Density: 1.8/sq mi (0.7/km^{2})
- Time zone: UTC-5 (Eastern (EST))
  - Summer (DST): UTC-4 (EDT)
- ZIP Codes: 04780 (Hersey); 04747 (Island Falls)
- Area code: 207
- FIPS code: 23-32685
- GNIS feature ID: 1729675
- Website: pattenmaine.org

Hersey is a town in Aroostook County, Maine, United States. The population was 73 at the 2020 census.

== Geography ==
According to the United States Census Bureau, the town has a total area of 39.86 square miles (103.24 km^{2}), of which 39.65 square miles (102.69 km^{2}) is land and 0.21 square miles (0.54 km^{2}) is water.

== Demographics ==
Historical population
Census	Pop.	Note	%±
1870	107		—
1880	159		48.6%
1890	151		−5.0%
1900	199		31.8%
1910	186		−6.5%
1920	245		31.7%
1930	195		−20.4%
1940	150		−23.1%
1950	116		−22.7%
1960	106		−8.6%
1970	81		−23.6%
1980	67		−17.3%
1990	69		3.0%
2000	63		−8.7%
2010	83		31.7%
2020	73		−12.0%
U.S. Decennial Census

=== 2010 census ===
As of the census of 2010, there were 83 people, 32 households, and 25 families living in the town. The population density was 2.1 inhabitants per square mile (0.8/km^{2}). There were 61 housing units at an average density of 1.5 per square mile (0.6/km^{2}). The racial makeup of the town was 100.0% White.

There were 32 households, of which 31.3% had children under the age of 18 living with them, 56.3% were married couples living together, 12.5% had a female householder with no husband present, 9.4% had a male householder with no wife present, and 21.9% were non-families. 15.6% of all households were made up of individuals, and 6.3% had someone living alone who was 65 years of age or older. The average household size was 2.59 and the average family size was 2.80.

The median age in the town was 45.3 years. 21.7% of residents were under the age of 18; 7.1% were between the ages of 18 and 24; 20.4% were from 25 to 44; 32.4% were from 45 to 64; and 18.1% were 65 years of age or older. The gender makeup of the town was 48.2% male and 51.8% female.

=== 2000 census ===
As of the census of 2000, there were 63 people, 28 households, and 19 families living in the town. The population density was 1.6 inhabitants per square mile (0.62/km^{2}). There were 52 housing units at an average density of 1.3 per square mile (0.50/km^{2}). The racial makeup of the town was 92.06% White, and 7.94% from two or more races.

There were 28 households, out of which 28.6% had children under the age of 18 living with them, 60.7% were married couples living together, 7.1% had a female householder with no husband present, and 32.1% were non-families. 32.1% of all households were made up of individuals, and 3.6% had someone living alone who was 65 years of age or older. The average household size was 2.25 and the average family size was 2.84.

In the town, the population was spread out, with 25.4% under the age of 18, 6.3% from 18 to 24, 27.0% from 25 to 44, 33.3% from 45 to 64, and 7.9% who were 65 years of age or older. The median age was 38 years. For every 100 females, there were 96.9 males. For every 100 females age 18 and over, there were 104.3 males.

The median income for a household in the town was $22,500, and the median income for a family was $28,750. Males had a median income of $29,688 versus $15,000 for females. The per capita income for the town was $9,425. There were 10.0% of families and 10.4% of the population living below the poverty line, including no under eighteens and none of those over 64.
