= Edward Wetenhall =

English bishop

Edward Wetenhall (1636–1713) was an English bishop of the Church of Ireland. His name is also spelled Wettenhall, Whetenhall, Whitnall, Withnoll, and Wythnall.

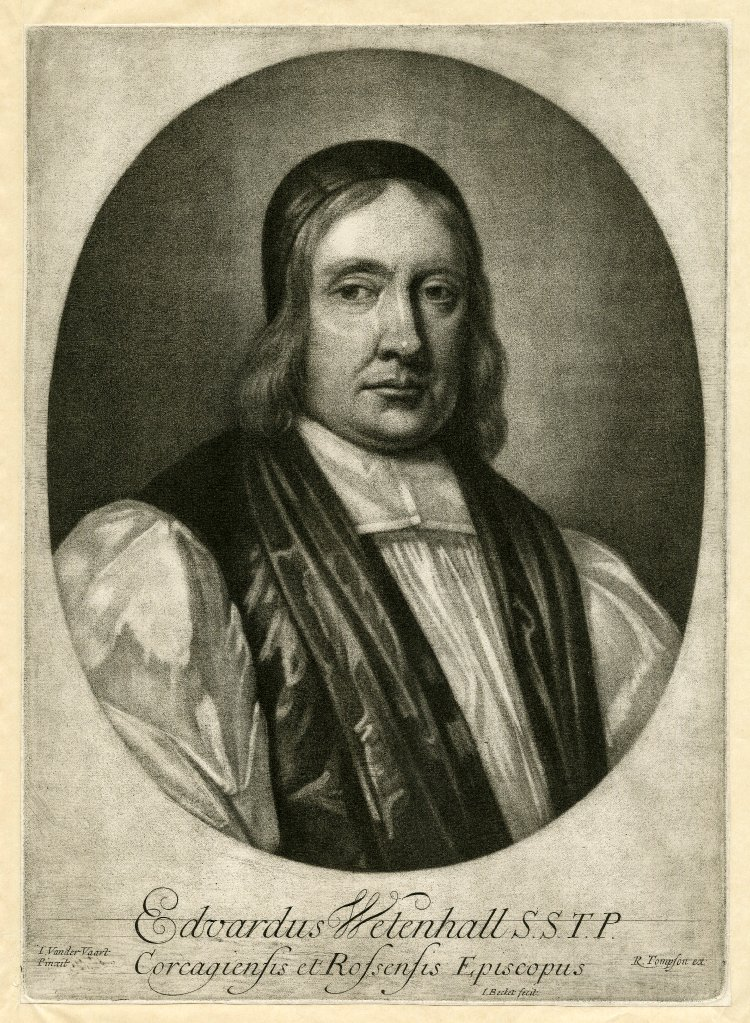

== Life ==
Wetenhall was born at Lichfield on 7 October 1636. Educated at Westminster School under Richard Busby, he was admitted as a king's scholar in 1651, and went to Trinity College, Cambridge, as a foundation scholar. After graduating B.A. 1659–60, he migrated (1660) to Lincoln College, Oxford, of which he became chaplain, was incorporated B.A. 18 June, and graduated M.A. 10 July 1661.

Wetenhall held the perpetual curacy of Combe Long, Oxfordshire, and the vicarage of St. Stephen's, near St Albans, Hertfordshire; on 11 June 1667 he was collated to a prebend at Exeter, holding with it the mastership (headmaster) of the blue-coat school. He graduated B.D. at Oxford 26 May 1669, and was incorporated B.D. at Cambridge 1670. Michael Boyle the younger, the Archbishop of Dublin, brought him over to Dublin in 1672, as master of the blue-coat school. He was made a Doctor of Divinity at Trinity College, Dublin, became curate of St. Werburgh's Church, and afterwards chantor of Christ Church. On the death (22 December 1678) of Edward Synge, Bishop of Cork, Cloyne, and Ross, the sees were separated, and Wetenhall was made (14 February 1679) bishop of Cork and Ross, being consecrated 23 March 1679 in Christ Church, Dublin.

At his own cost, Wetenhall restored the episcopal residence at Cork. As one of the seven bishops who remained in Ireland during the troubles which began in 1688, he was exposed to much ill-usage at the hands of the Jacobite partisans of James II. He was summoned to attend the short-lived Patriot Parliament called by James II in 1689. He was probably the author of an anonymous tract 'The Case of the Irish Protestants in relation to ... Allegiance to ... King William and Queen Mary,’ 1691 (27 October 1690). He signed the episcopal letter of thanks (November 1692) to Thomas Firmin for his exertions in relief of the distressed Protestants of Ireland. Only one Irish prelate, William Sheridan (died 1716) of Kilmore and Ardagh, was deprived (1691) as a nonjuror. Wetenhall, who was translated as bishop of Kilmore and Ardagh on 18 April 1699, would not accept the preferment without trying to procure the restoration of Sheridan, to whose support he contributed. He restored the episcopal residence at Kilmore and rebuilt the cathedral at Ardagh (later demolished). He recovered lands belonging to the see, alienated by William Smith (d. 1698), his predecessor, but also sold a valuable wood of the see.

A moderate on concessions to Dissenters, which he had advocated from 1682, Wetenhall was prepared to go further than the English Toleration Act. He intervened as a peacemaker in the controversy on the doctrine of the Trinity raised by the publications of William Sherlock and John Wallis. In An Earnest and Compassionate Suit for Forbearance … by a Melancholy Stander-by, 1691, he commends Richard Hooker's "explication of this mystery", and argues that further discussion is futile and damaging. He followed it up with The Antapology of the Melancholy Stander-by, 1693. Against William Penn he wrote a couple of pamphlets (1698–9). He was present (but not on the bench) at the trial (14 June 1703) in Dublin of Thomas Emlyn the Unitarian, and subsequently paid friendly visits to him in prison. In 1710 he drew up a memorial to James Butler, 2nd Duke of Ormonde, the lord lieutenant, urging the need of providing 'books of religion' in the Irish language, in accordance with the ideas of John Richardson, D.D. (1664–1747), a clergyman in his diocese.

Wetenhall's later years were spent in London, where he died on 12 November 1713; he was buried on 18 November in the south transept of Westminster Abbey, where there is an inscribed gravestone to his memory. In his will he affirms the church of England and Ireland to be "the purest church in the world", though "there are divers points which might be altered for the better" in "articles, liturgy, and discipline, but especially in the conditions of clerical communion."

== Works ==
Besides the above and single sermons, a charge (1691) and tracts, including the funeral sermon for James Bonnell, Wetenhall published:

- Enter into Thy Closet: A Method … for Private Devotion, 1666.
- The Wish: being the Tenth Satyr of Juvenal … in Pindarick Verse, Dublin, 1675.
- The Catechism of the Church of England, with Marginal Notes, 1678.
- Of Gifts and Offices in … Worship, Dublin, 1676–9.
- The Protestant Peacemaker, 1682, (answered by Richard Baxter in History of Councils, 1682).
- A Judgment of the Comet … at Dublin, 13 Dec. 1680, 1682.
- Hexapla Jacobæa: a Specimen of Loyalty to … James II, in Six Pieces, Dublin, 1686, (sermons).
- A Plain Discourse proving the … Authority of the … Scriptures, 1688, (with new title, 1689).
- A Letter … occasioned by the Surrender of Mons, 1691, (anon.).
- A Method … to be … prepared for Death, 1694.
- The Testimony of the Bishop of Cork as to a Paper intituled Gospel Truths … by the People called Quakers, Cork, 1698.
- A brief … Reply to Mr. Penn's … Defence, Cork, 1699.
- Due Frequency of the Lord's Supper, 1703.
- A View of our Lord's Passion, with Meditations, 1710.

His revision of the Eton Latin Grammar was reprinted in 1856. His Græcæ Grammatices Institutio, 4th edit. 1713, was translated and revised by George Newenham Wright (2nd ed. 1820), and edited as Græcæ Grammatices Rudimenta, by George Bomford Wheeler, 1853. In 1692 he edited sermons by Ezekiel Hopkins.

== Family ==
Wetenhall married twice; his second wife was Philippa (buried 18 April 1717), sixth daughter of Sir William D'Oyly, bart., of Shottisham, Kent. His eldest son by his first wife was Edward Wetenhall, M.D. (died 29 August 1733, aged 70).
