= John McBride (minister) =

Irish presbyterian minister

- Born: 1651? Ulster
- Died: 21 July 1718
- Occupation: Presbyterian minister

John McBride (1651? – 21 July 1718) was an Irish minister of the Presbyterian General Synod of Ulster and religious controversialist.

== Biography ==
McBride was born in Ulster about 1651. He was probably the son of John McBryde, a merchant, who was admitted a free stapler of Belfast on 6 March 1644, and who signed the covenant at Holywood, County Down, on 8 April 1644. John entered the university of Glasgow in 1666, signing himself ‘Johannes McBryd, Hybernus,’ and graduated on 15 July 1673.

In 1680 he received presbyterian ordination as minister of Clare, Co. Armagh. He left Ireland during the troubles of 1688 and became minister of Borgue, Kirkcudbrightshire. In 1691 he received a call to Ayr, but the presbytery decided against his translation; he sat as a member of the general assembly in 1692. He was called to Belfast as successor to Patrick Adair and installed there on 3 October 1694. Soon after his settlement, he obtained a considerable plot of ground in Rosemary Lane, on which his congregation erected a new meeting-house, removing to it about 1695 from their old one in North Street. There being as yet no Irish toleration act, the congregation held this property on goodwill; no lease was granted till 1767. McBride exerted himself at Dublin in September 1695 to obtain a legal toleration; in his phrase, his efforts were ‘drowned with court holy water.’ He came out as an author in 1697, defending a plea for toleration by Joseph Boyse.

In 1697, he became moderator of the general synod of Ulster. On his appointment as moderator, he gave a special sermon which was then printed without his knowledge, with a title-page styling him as ‘minister of Belfast’; this enraged the Anglican bishop and on 10 October McBride appeared on summons before the lords justices in Dublin, at the instance of five bishops, to answer for this and other enormities. The lords justices dismissed the case, ‘with an advice to him and his brethren to carry rectably towards the established church, and to them [the bishops] to carry moderately.’

The renewed patent for the ‘regium donum’ was lodged in his hands in 1699.

In 1702 he published a spirited defence of the validity of Presbyterian marriages.

McBride was a strong advocate of the Hanoverian succession, but scrupled at the oath of abjuration (declaring the Pretender to be no son of James II) imposed in 1703. By the advice of the Belfast presbytery, he summoned the general synod to meet at Antrim on 1 June 1703, six weeks before the appointed time, in order to consider the oath, which was to be taken by 1 August. Several leading Presbyterians were non-abjurors; McBride avoided the oath by retiring to Glasgow, where in 1704 he made a gift of books to the university library. (The oath was not imposed in Scotland till 1712.) On 19 October a committee of the Irish House of Commons recommended that he be deprived of ‘regium donum;’ but this was not done. He was back in Belfast before the synod of June 1704. In the winter of 1705, information was sworn against him as a non-abjuror before the Rev. John Winder, J.P., at Carnmoney, co. Antrim. He escaped in disguise and proceeded to Glasgow by way of Donaghadee. McBride was three years in Glasgow, exercising his ministry there, but retaining his charge in Belfast, and refusing a divinity chair at Glasgow University. On 4 June 1706 the synod gave order for the appointment of James Kirkpatrick as his assistant and successor. The whole available stipend was 160l. Irish, or 147l. 13s. 10¼d. sterling. McBride wrote from Stranraer on 18 June to his Belfast flock, advising that as there were ‘three thousand persons’ in the congregation, there should be two meeting-houses as well as two ministers. Kirkpatrick was appointed on 24 September, and by June 1708 a second meeting-house was erected, in the rear of the first, and on the same plot of ground. The synod of 1708, after long debates at the ordinary and a special meeting, agreed to divide the congregation, assigning the first meeting-house, with the manse, to McBride, and sending him ‘a kind affectionate letter,’ inviting and requiring him ‘to come home so soon as he can.’ Samuel Smith, one of his elders, went to Glasgow for him.

As moderator of the Glasgow presbytery he had signed in March an address to the queen, expressing abhorrence of the attempt of the French fleet upon the Scottish coast in the Pretender's interest. Returning to Ireland, he appeared before the justices at Carrickfergus, and was discharged without trial. In August 1711 a warrant was issued by Westenra Waring, high sheriff of county Antrim, and another justice for the arrest of McBride and other ministers as non-abjurors. At the spring assizes 1712, they were presented by the grand jury of county Antrim as disloyal men. McBride crossed over to Scotland at the beginning of May. According to William Bruce, Thomas Milling had been appointed his colleague in 1711; there is no trace of this name in the synod records. The general synod which met at Belfast in June resolved, in reference to the oath, that all ministers ‘who've not taken the same be advis'd (if they have clearness to do it) to take it as soon and in as private a way as they can.’ The same meeting renewed an appointment previously made, authorising McBride to compile ‘an history of this church,’ and desiring Kirkpatrick to assist him. McBride's next and last publication had an historical bearing; more was done by Kirkpatrick.

On 8 June 1713 McBride returned to Belfast for the last time; he was not again seriously molested, for though the high sheriff gave orders for his apprehension, the sub-sheriff, Jeremy Phillips, took care not to find him. He was evidently a popular man, and manuscript reports of his discourses, show him to have been an able preacher. Bruce's statement that he ‘prepared students for the ministry,’ if correct, refers probably to work done in Glasgow. His portrait bears out Kirkpatrick's account of him as ‘of a pleasant temper,’ and one who ‘can't baulk his jest.’ For the truth of one of the stories of his humour we have his own authority. Asked by a clergyman of Down why he would not abjure the Pretender, he replied ‘that once upon a time there was a bearn, that cou'd not be persuaded to bann the de'el, because he did not know but he might soon come into his clutches.’

== Death and legacy ==
During the winter of 1713–14 he complained to his friend Robert Wodrow, ‘that lordly prelate, gout, hath kept me his prisoner in Cripplegate.’ By 1718 he was in very infirm health. He attended the general synod at Belfast on 17 June, when a call to John Abernethy, as his assistant and successor, failed to obtain synodical sanction. He died on 21 July 1718, ‘ætatis suæ 68,’ and was buried on 23 July in the old churchyard of Belfast (site of the present St. George's), where a red marble tombstone, not now extant, bore a Latin inscription which is preserved.

His portrait was sold by mistake with his furniture during his residence in Glasgow; many years after it was recovered in an auction room, and presented to his surviving daughter, Mrs. Dyatt; it became the property of the first presbyterian church of Belfast; it bears the marks of the ‘sovereign,’ or mayor of Belfast, who thrust his rapier through the cambric band when searching the manse for him in 1705.

== Family ==
He married Margaret Fairlie of Tullyveery, Co Down; they had at least four children, and one descendant was Edgar Allan Poe.

Robert McBride (1687–1759), son of the above, was born at Clare in 1687. On 28 May 1716 he preached in his father's meeting-house a sermon on George I's birthday, at the request of the Belfast Independent Volunteers. He was ordained on 26 September 1716, by Coleraine presbytery, as minister of Ballymoney, co. Antrim, in succession to Hugh Kirkpatrick, father of James, mentioned above. In the synodical controversies of 1720–6 he took the side of subscription. He died on 2 Sept. 1759, in his seventy-third year, and was buried in Ballymoney churchyard; there is an inscribed tablet to his memory in the parish church. His two sons, David and John, are separately noticed. He published: 1. ‘A Sermon,’ &c., Belfast, 1716, 8vo. 2. ‘The Overtures … in a fair light, in answer to Mr. Higinbotham,’ &c., Belfast, 1726, 4to. (Robert Higinbotham was presbyterian minister of Coleraine.)

== Publications ==
He published:

- ‘Animadversions on the Defence of the Answer to … “The Case of the Dissenting Protestants of Ireland … together with an Answer to a Peaceable and Friendly Address,”’ &c., 1697, 4to (anon.; no place or printer's name; the ‘Defence’ was by Tobias Pullen, bishop of Dromore; the ‘Address’ by Edward Synge, afterwards archbishop of Tuam, who replied).
- ‘A Sermon before the Provincial Synod at Antrim … by Mr. John Mac-Bride,’ &c., 1698, 4to (no place or printer's name).
- ‘A Vindication of Marriage as solemnised by Presbyterians in the North of Ireland. … By a Minister of the Gospel,’ &c., 1702, 4to (anon.; no place or printer's name; answers were published in 1704, anon., by Ralph Lambert, afterwards bishop of Meath, and in 1705 by Synge). It has been conjectured that the above three tracts were printed in Belfast; accordingly they are included in John Anderson's ‘Catalogue of Early Belfast Printed Books,’ 1890; it seems more probable that they were printed in Glasgow.
- ‘A Sample of Jet-black Prelatic Calumny, in answer to … “A Sample of True-blue Presbyterian Loyalty,”’ &c., Glasgow, 1713, 4to (anon.; has been assigned to others [see William Jameson]; the ‘Wodrow Correspondence’ proves McBride's authorship; it was in the press in February, and printed by the end of May; the ‘True-blue Presbyterian,’ Dublin, 1709, 4to, was by William Tisdall, D.D., vicar of Belfast). As a controversialist McBride is inferior to Tisdall, and as an historian to Kirkpatrick; his treatise preserves a few important documents.
