= John Tillotson =

Archbishop of Canterbury from 1691 to 1694

The Most Reverend and Right Honourable John Tillotson
- Archbishop of Canterbury
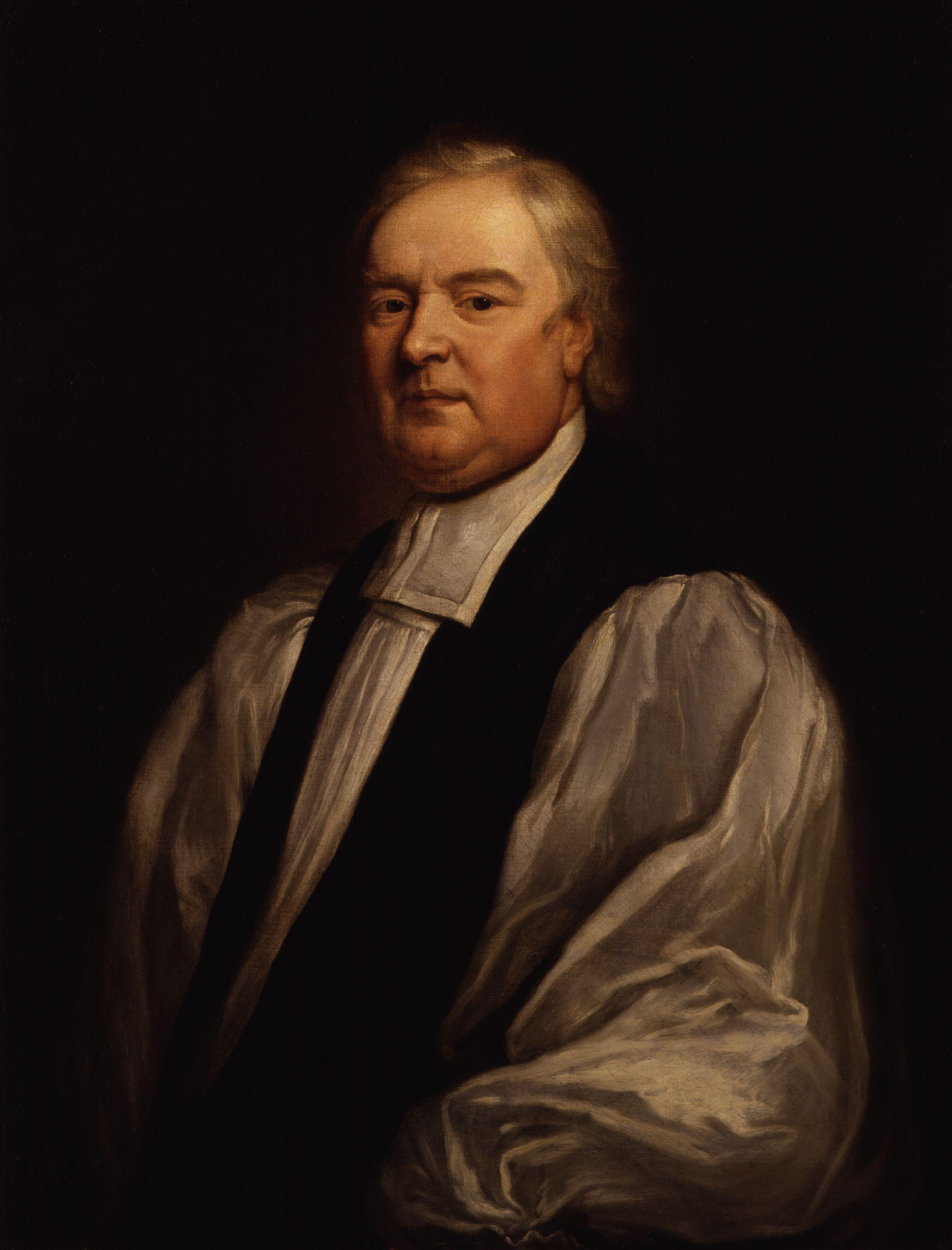
- Portrait by Godfrey Kneller
- Church: Church of England
- Diocese: Canterbury
- Installed: April 1691
- Term ended: 22 November 1694
- Predecessor: William Sancroft
- Successor: Thomas Tenison

Orders
- Consecration: 31 May 1691 by Peter Mews

Personal details
- Born: October 1630 Sowerby, Yorkshire, England
- Died: 22 November 1694 (aged 64)
- Denomination: Anglican
- Spouse: Elizabeth Tillotson née French
- Education: Clare College, Cambridge

John Tillotson (October 1630 – 22 November 1694) was the Archbishop of Canterbury from 1691 to 1694.

== Curate and rector ==
Tillotson was the son of a Puritan clothier at Haughend, Sowerby, Yorkshire. Little is known of his early youth; he studied at Colne Grammar School, before entering as a pensioner of Clare Hall, Cambridge, in 1647. His tutor was David Clarkson and he graduated in 1650, being made a fellow of his college in 1651.

In 1656 Tillotson became tutor to the son of Edmund Prideaux, attorney-general to Oliver Cromwell. About 1661 he was ordained without subscription by Thomas Sydserf, a Scottish bishop. Tillotson was present at the Savoy Conference in 1661, and remained identified with the Presbyterians until the passing of the Act of Uniformity 1662. Shortly afterwards he became curate of Cheshunt, Herts, and in June 1663, rector of Kedington, Suffolk.

He now devoted himself to an exact study of biblical and patristic writers, especially Basil and Chrysostom. The result of this reading, and of the influence of John Wilkins, Master of Trinity College, Cambridge, was seen in the general tone of his preaching, which was practical rather than theological, concerned with issues of personal morality instead of theoretical doctrine. This plain style of preaching is reflective of the late 17th century, when the integration of reason into Protestant theology came to be seen as one of its finest attributes against Catholicism. Tillotson himself was personally tolerant enough towards Catholics, remarking in a famous sermon that while Popery was "gross superstition", yet "Papists, I doubt not, are made like other men". He was actually a latitudinarian, also known as "Cambridge Arminianism". Besides, Tillotson adopted Arminian views.

He was a man of the world as well as a divine, and in his sermons, he exhibited a tact which enabled him at once to win the ear of his audience. In 1664 he became preacher at Lincoln's Inn. The same year he married Elizabeth French, a niece of Oliver Cromwell; and he also became a Tuesday lecturer at St Lawrence, Jewry (where he was later buried). Tillotson employed his controversial weapons with some skill against atheism and Catholicism. In 1663 he published a characteristic sermon on "The Wisdom of being Religious," and in 1666 replied to John Sergeant's Sure Footing in Christianity by a pamphlet on the "Rule of Faith." The same year he received the degree of D.D.

== Dean of Canterbury and Archbishop ==
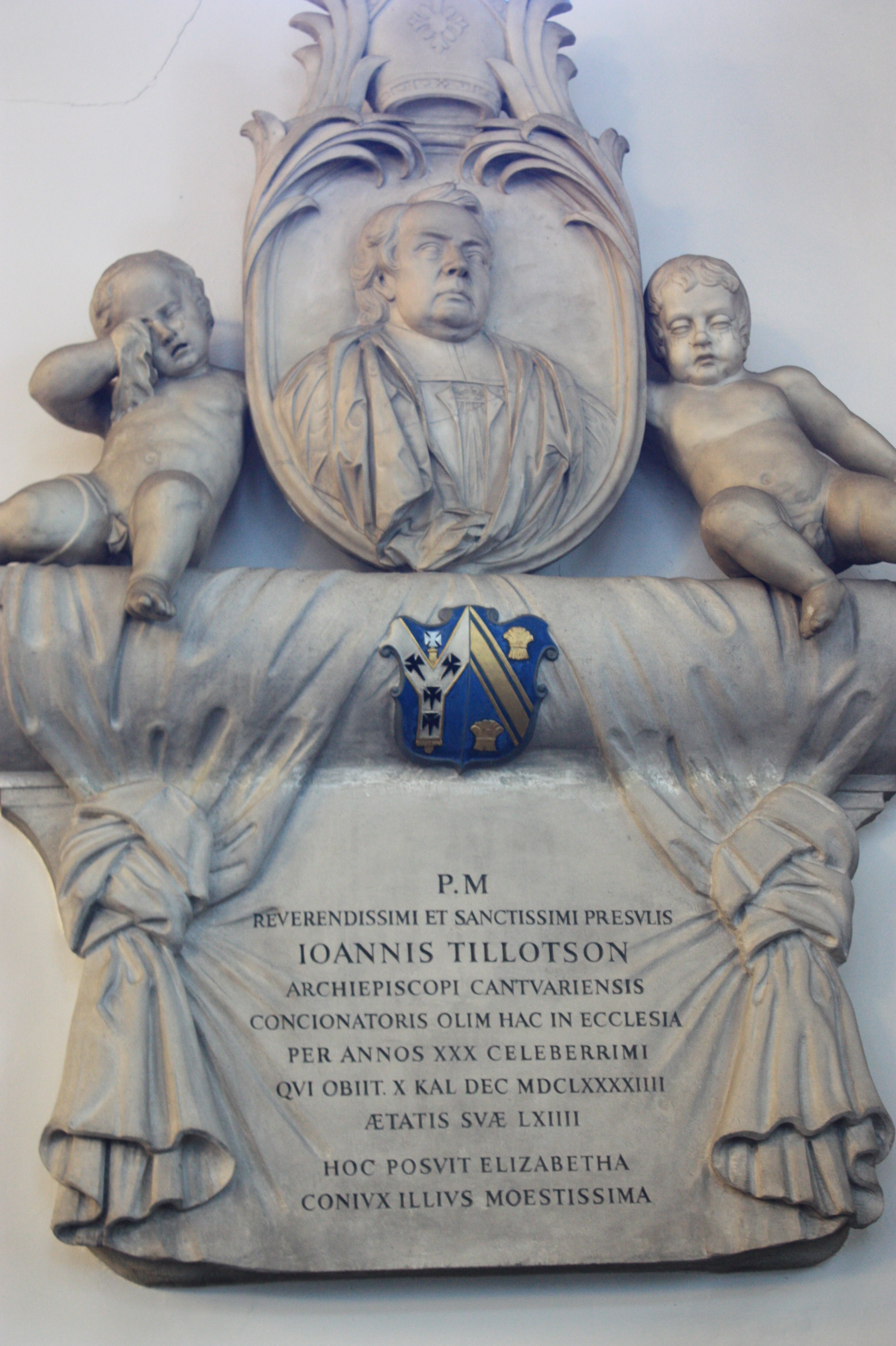
The grave of John Tillotson, St Lawrence Jewry, London

In 1670 he became prebendary and in 1672 dean of Canterbury. That latter year he was also elected a Fellow of the Royal Society. In 1675 he edited John Wilkins's Principles of Natural Religion, completing what was left unfinished of it, and in 1682 his Sermons. Along with Burnet, Tillotson attended William Russell, Lord Russell on the scaffold in 1683. In 1684, he wrote a Discourse against Transubstantiation. He afterwards enjoyed the friendship of Lady Russell, and it was partly through her that he obtained so much influence with Princess Anne, who followed his advice in regard to the settlement of the crown on William of Orange. He possessed the special confidence of William and Mary, and was made clerk of the closet to the king in March 1689.

It was chiefly through his advice that the king appointed an ecclesiastical commission for the reconciliation of the Dissenters. In August of this year, he was appointed by the chapter of his cathedral to exercise the archepiscopal jurisdiction of the province of Canterbury during the suspension of Sancroft. He was also, about the same time, named Dean of St Paul's. Soon afterwards he was elected to succeed Sancroft as archbishop; but accepted the promotion with extreme reluctance, and it was deferred from time to time, at his request, until April 1691. In 1693 he published four lectures on the Socinian controversy, partly to clear his own name from charges of sympathy with Socinianism in his previous associations with Thomas Firmin, Stephen Nye and others.

His attempts to reform certain abuses of the Church of England, especially that of clerical non-residence, awakened much ill-will, and of this the Jacobites took advantage, pursuing him to the end of his life with insult and reproach. He died on 22 November 1694.

For his manuscript sermons, Tillotson's widow received 2500 guineas. Ralph Barker edited some 250 of them together with the "Rule of Faith" (1695–1704). In 1752 an edition appeared in 3 vols., with Life by Thomas Birch, compiled from Tillotson's original papers and letters. Various selections from his sermons and works have been published separately. AMS Press, New York, published a modern edition of his works in the 1980s. In his home town of Sowerby, a statue of Tillotson still exists in St. Peter's church and an avenue is named after him in the lower end of the town.

He is buried in the church of St Lawrence Jewry just west of the Bank of England in the City of London.

Thomas Tillotson was his great great nephew.

== Works ==
- A Sermon Concerning the Unity of the Divine Nature and the Blessed Trinity. London. 1693.
- Several Discourses of Repentance (1700)
- Thomas Birch, ed. (1752). The Works of John Tillotson with the Life of the author.
- A Discourse Against Transubstantiation
- A Persuasive to Frequent Communion in the Holy Sacrament of the Lord's Supper
- Ten Volume Set of the Works of John Tillotson

== Arms ==
Coat of arms of John Tillotson
Notes While Tillotson was serving as a bishop his arms would be displayed impaled with those of the diocese and topped by a mitre. Escutcheon Azure a bend cotised between two garbs Or.

== Notes and references ==
=== Sources ===
- Carr, James (1878). Annals and stories of Colne and neighbourhood.
- This article incorporates text from a publication now in the public domain: Chisholm, Hugh, ed. (1911). "Tillotson, John". Encyclopædia Britannica. Vol. 26 (11th ed.). Cambridge University Press. p. 976.
- Rivers, Isabel. "Tillotson, John (1630–1694)". Oxford Dictionary of National Biography (online ed.). Oxford University Press. doi:10.1093/ref:odnb/27449. (Subscription, Wikipedia Library access or UK public library membership required.)
- Gordon, Alexander (1898). "Tillotson, John" . In Lee, Sidney (ed.). Dictionary of National Biography. Vol. 56. London: Smith, Elder & Co.
- Lueker, Erwin Louis (2000b). "Arminianism". Christian Cyclopedia. Saint Louis, MO: Concordia publ. House.
- Lueker, Erwin Louis (2000). "Tillotson, John Robert". Christian Cyclopedia. Saint Louis, MO: Concordia publ. House.

Church of England titles
Preceded by Thomas Turner	Dean of Canterbury; 1672–1689	Succeeded by John Sharp
Preceded by Edward Stillingfleet	Dean of St Paul's; 1689–1691	Succeeded by William Sherlock
Preceded by William Sancroft	Archbishop of Canterbury; 1691–1694	Succeeded by Thomas Tenison
