= Boyse =

Boyse is a surname, and may refer to:

- Edward Boyse (1923–2007), British-born American physician and biologist
- Joseph Boyse (1660–1728), English Presbyterian minister in Ireland and controversialist
- Maurice Boyse (born 1955), former Australian rules footballer
- Samuel Boyse (1708–1749), Irish poet and writer
- Boyse SIBY (1990-.....), Sénégal-Born Ingénieur d'affaires /Cyber/IT recruiter
