= Socinian controversy =

17th-century Church of England argument

The Socinian controversy in the Church of England (sometimes called the First Socinian controversy to distinguish it from a debate around 1800 mainly affecting Protestant nonconformists; and also called the Trinitarian controversy) was a theological argument on christology carried out by English theologians for around a decade from 1687. Positions that had remained largely dormant since the death in 1662 of John Biddle, an early Unitarian, were revived and discussed, in pamphlet literature (much of it anonymous).

This controversy was part of a larger debate after the Act of Toleration 1689, which excluded from its eligibility for high offices anti-trinitarian Christians (such as Unitarians) as well as Roman Catholics. By the end of the 1690s it had become clear that, for many years, religious tolerance would not be extended. Across all media, the Blasphemy Act 1697 prohibited any preaching, teaching, writing or "advised speaking" of Christians for unitarianism for 116 years (and three other basic teachings of Christianity in its view, which are rarely debated so continued until the abolition in secular law of all blasphemy). The Doctrine of the Trinity Act 1813 then re-enables Christians, subject to any tenets of a church they wish to remain part of, to critique and practise against the equality within the Holy Trinity, but kept a prohibition for advised speaking or writing as to more than one God among Christians.

During this decade the arguments had become well aired, and the Church of England was proven to be more diverse in theological understanding than much law and treatise had suggested. An unintended consequence of strong attacks by theologically orthodox Anglicans, in the longer term, was a resulting greater de facto tolerance extending among English Protestants, after a halt was called to the aggressive orthodoxy of William Sherlock. This tolerance, becoming a hallmark of Latitudinarian views as they changed into low church liberality, worked its way out in impactful controversies; the splintering away of many congregations and even some parish priests of the eighteenth century, for which see English dissenters (all nonconformists including Roman Catholics), ecclesiastical separatism, and 17th-century denominations in England.

== Detailed history ==
The Socinian argument, of which little had been heard for 25 years, was revived in 1687 by the publication of a ‘Brief History’ of the unitarians, as they from now on often designated themselves (see Stephen Nye). There followed (1689) a sheet of ‘Brief Notes’ on the Athanasian creed (see Thomas Firmin).

These two publications prompted William Sherlock's Vindication (1690) of the doctrine of the Trinity. Shortly afterwards (11 August 1690) the subject was also taken up by John Wallis. The Socinians and others accused Sherlock's ‘Vindication’ of tritheism; and reputedly this work had the effect of making a Socinian of William Manning and an Arian of Thomas Emlyn. Sherlock's position was attacked also by another Anglican, Robert South, with a mixture of irony and invective.

Sherlock's doctrine, as preached at Oxford by Joseph Bingham, was condemned by the hebdomadal council (25 November 1695), as ‘falsa, impia et hæretica’ (false, impious and heretical). Sherlock defended himself in an ‘Examination’ (1696) of the decree.

On 3 February 1696 William III addressed to the hierarchy ‘Directions,’ drawn up by Thomas Tenison, prohibiting the use of ‘all new terms’ relating to the Trinity. In his ‘Present State of the Socinian Controversy’ (1698, but most of it printed 1696) Sherlock in practical terms gave up on the positions that had been impugned.

Literature related to the argument was still voluminous, however, in the period up to 1704. One notable reader and student of the debate was John Locke.

== Timeline of publications ==
| Year | Author | Publication | Position | Replies |
|---|---|---|---|---|
| 1690 | Arthur Bury | The Naked Gospel | Latitudinarian | William Nicholls, An Answer to an Heretical Book, called the Naked Gospel, 1691; Thomas Long, An Answer to a Socinian Treatise called 'The Naked Gospel", 1691. |
| 1690 | William Sherlock | A vindication of the doctrine of the holy and ever blessed Trinity, and the incarnation of the Son of God: Occasioned by the Brief notes on the creed of St. Athanasius, and the Brief history of the Unitarians, or Socinians, and containing an answer to both | Trinitarian Anglican | Robert South (anonymous) Animadversions on Dr Sherlock's Book, entitled a Vindication of the Holy and Ever Blessed Trinity, 1693; Remarks upon a Book Lately Published by Dr. William Sherlock, 1695. |
| 1690 | John Wallis | The Doctrine of the Blessed Trinity, briefly explained in a letter to a friend | Trinitarian Presbyterian |
| 1691 | Daniel Whitby | Tractatus de vera Christi Deitate adversus Arii et Socini hæreses | Latitudinarian |
| 1691 | William Freke | The Arrian's Vindication of Himself | Arian | John Wallis, A Fourth Letter, Concerning the Sacred Trinity, 1691. |
| 1693 | Stephen Nye, anonymously | Considerations on the Explications of the Doctrine of the Trinity, By Dr. Wallis, Dr. Sherlock, Dr. South, Dr. Cudworth, and Mr. Hooker; as also on the Account given by those that say, the Trinity is an Unconceivable and Inexplicable Mystery | Sabellian |
| 1693 | Edward Fowler | Twenty-eight Propositions, by which the Doctrine of the Trinity is endeavoured to be explained (anonymous), and subsequent defences. | Latitudinarian | Matthew Tindal, Reflections on the 28 Propositions, 1695. |
| 1693 | Francis Fullwood | The Socinian Controversie | Trinitarian Anglican (ex non-juror) |
| 1693 | Jonathan Edwards | A Preservative Against Socinianism (appeared in parts from this year) | Argued that Socinus had founded a new non-Christian religion. |
| 1694 | George Bull | Judicium Ecclesiae Catholicae | Athanasian | Gilbert Clerke and Samuel Crellius, Tractatus Tres, 1695. |
| 1695 | Charles Leslie | The Charge of Socinianism against Dr. Tillotson Considered | Church of Ireland non-juror |
| 1695 | John Smith | A designed End to the Socinian Controversy: or a rational and plain Discourse that no other person but the Father of Christ is God Most High | Unitarian | Francis Gregory, A divine antidote against a devilish poyson, or, A scriptural answer to an anti-scriptural and heretical pamphlet entituled A designed end to the Socinian controversie, written by John Smith, 1695. |
| 1696 | John Edwards | Socinianism Unmask'd, followed by The Socinian Creed, (1697) | Calvinist | John Locke, Vindication of his Essay of the Reasonableness of Christianity; Samuel Bold, Discourse on the true Knowledge of Christ Jesus, 1697. |
| 1702 | Thomas Emlyn | An Humble Inquiry into the Scripture Account of Jesus Christ (anonymous) | Unitarian |
