= Archibald Turner =

Archibald or Archie Turner may refer to:

- Archibald Turner (footballer)
- Archibald Turner (minister)
- Archie Turner (footballer)
- Archie Turner (musician)
- Archie Turner (athlete)
