= William Jameson (religious controversialist) =

Scottish university teacher and religious controversialist

- Occupations: University teacher and religious controversialist

William Jameson (fl. 1689–1720) was a blind Scottish university teacher and religious controversialist.

== Biography ==
Jameson was born blind, but, being educated at the university of Glasgow, he ‘atteaned to great learning, and became particularly well skilled in history both civill and ecclesiastick’ (Munimenta Univ. Glasg., Maitland Club, ii. 363). He may possibly be the William Gemisoune who was a student in December 1676 (ib.) On 30 May 1692 the senate, taking into consideration the blindness and great learning of Jameson, who had no estate to subsist by, allowed him two hundred merks Scots for two years, for which he was to give instruction ‘according to his capacity’ in civil and ecclesiastical history under the direction of the faculty (ib. ii. 363). From December 1692 he delivered a public prelection on civil history once a week in Latin (ib. ii. 364). He is sometimes designated as lecturer, sometimes loosely as professor of history. In 1696 the university increased his annuity to 400l., on the promise of a committee of visitation that the government would shortly relieve them of the burden. It was not, however, till 1705 that the promise was fulfilled (ib. ii. 388). In 1705 Jameson wrote of his long sickness and indisposition (Cyprianus, Pref.). In the Wodrow MSS. (Advoc. Library, Jac. vi. 27, quoted in W. J. Duncan's Notices of the Literary History of Glasgow, Maitland Club, 1831) there is a note that, till the beginning of 1710, there had for many years been no public prelections in the university of Glasgow excepting some discourses by Dr. Robert St. Clare and Jameson. Another William Jameson entered the university of Glasgow in 1720, and in 1727 he or a namesake, ‘historiæ studiosus,’ was placed on the roll of electors of the lord rector (Munim.)

Jameson published at Edinburgh in 1689 ‘Verus Patroclus; or the Weapons of Quakerism the weakness of Quakerism.’ According to the dedication to the Earl of Dundonald, its publication had been prohibited in May 1689 by Dr. Alexander Monro, principal of Edinburgh University and inspector of the press, unless all mention of popery was omitted. In the bitter literary controversy between episcopalians and presbyterians which raged for over twenty years after the expulsion of Monro and others from Edinburgh University, and turned upon the position of the apostolic and patristic bishop, Jameson vehemently maintained the presbyterian view. In 1697 he published at Glasgow ‘Nazianzeni querela et votum justum (Greg. Naz. Orat. 28); the fundamentals of the Hierarchy examined and disproved,’ in reply to Monro and Bishop John Sage. His attack in this work upon the authority of the epistles of St. Ignatius drew a ‘Short Answer’ from Robert Calder in 1708. Jameson's next book, ‘Roma Racoviana et Racovia Romana, id est Papistarum et Socinistarum in plurimis religionis suæ capitibus plena et exacta harmonia,’ appeared at Edinburgh in 1702. In 1705 he interfered in the controversy between Gilbert Rule, Monro's successor as principal of Edinburgh University, and Bishop Sage over the Cyprianic bishop, with his ‘Cyprianus Isotimus,’ Edinburgh, 1705. In 1708 Jameson published at Edinburgh ‘Mr. John Davidson's Catechism,’ with a controversial discourse prefixed. In 1712 appeared also at Edinburgh ‘The Sum of the Episcopal Controversy.’ Jameson ‘doubted not that the Spirit of God had a peculiar view to Scotland, when he says by Isaiah, “I will make an everlasting Covenant with you,” &c.’ In a second edition of this diatribe (Glasgow, 1713) he seems to claim as his ‘A Sample of Jet-black Prelatick Calumny,’ Glasgow, 1713. His last known book was ‘Spicilegia Antiquitatum Ægypti, atque ei vicinarum gentium,’ Glasgow, 1720, a premature attempt to harmonize sacred and profane history.
