= Henry Hedworth =

Henry Hedworth (1626–1705) of Huntingdon was a Unitarian writer.

Henry Hedworth is chiefly notable for being the first person in the English language to introduce Latin (and Dutch) term "Unitarian" into print in England 1673, fourteen years before Stephen Nye of Hertfordshire became the first to use the word on a title page when he anonymously published Brief History of the Unitarians also called Socinians in 1687 (expanded 1691). The term was already found in private letters, since the term "Unitarian" was already known in England from works such as the Bibliotheca Fratrum Polonorum quos Unitarios vocant (catalogued "post A.D. 1656", in fact 1668).

At this point, and for nearly 100 years after, the Anglican church generally referred to those holding these beliefs as Socinians after Fausto Sozzini.

Hedworth was a student of John Biddle (Unitarian) and friend of Thomas Firmin.

== Works ==
- 1694 Stephen Nye, Henry Hedworth Considerations on the explications of the doctrine of the Trinity
- 1672 The spirit of the Quakers tried, according to that discovery it hath made. Society of Friends
