= Stephen Nye =

British theologian

Stephen Nye (1648–1719) was an English clergyman, known as a theological writer and for his Unitarian views.

== Life ==
Son of John Nye, he graduated B.A. at Magdalene College, Cambridge in 1665. He became rector of Little Hormead, Hertfordshire in 1679. Thomas Firmin was a close associate.

== Work ==
Although the term “Unitarian” was already known in England from the Latin Library of the Polish Brethren called Unitarians published in Amsterdam (1665-1668), and had been used in print before by Henry Hedworth (1673), Nye's book gave the term wider currency in English among antitrinitarian believers, and set off the Unitarian controversy. Nye distinguished Unitarian views from those of Arius (Arian views) and Fausto Sozzini (Socinian views). He called William Sherlock a tritheist, Robert South a Socinian, and John Wallis a Sabellian. He faced much opposition from orthodox Anglicans, but had an ally in William Freke. Thomas Tenison, Archbishop of Canterbury from 1695, discouraged those who wanted to continue the debate.

Nye wrote also on natural religion; he corresponded with Henry Hedworth and published some of those letters.

== Bibliography ==
- A brief history of the Unitarians, called also Socinians: in four letters, written to a friend (published anonymously at London in 1687, expanded 1691).
- A letter of resolution concerning the doctrines of the Trinity and the Incarnation, London, 1691.
- Considerations on the explications of the doctrine of the Trinity by Dr. Wallis, Dr. Sherlock, Dr. S-th, Dr. Cudworth, and Mr. Hooker [electronic resource] : as also on the account given by those that say the Trinity is an unconceivable and inexplicable mystery / written to a person of quality, London, 1693.
