= Gilbert Rule =

Scottish cleric and Principal of Edinburgh University

- Born: c. 1629
- Died: 1701
- Education: University of Edinburgh
- Occupations: Pastor, theologian
- Children: 5
- Theological work
- Tradition or movement: Presbyterianism

Gilbert Rule (c. 1629 – 1701) was a nonconformist Church of Scotland minister and the Principal of the University of Edinburgh from 1690 to 1701.

== Early life ==
Rule was born about 1629, probably in Edinburgh, where his brother, Archibald, was one of the bailies (there is some likelihood, however, that he was born at Elgin in October 1628, see Tate's Alnwick). The Dictionary of National Biography gives Archibald's occupation as a merchant and a magistrate. Hew Scott states that it is "not unlikely" that his father was George Rule, minister at Longformacus, and his mother, Anna Johnston. He graduated MA from the University of Edinburgh.

After a distinguished career at the University of Glasgow, where he was regent, he became (at an unusually early age), Sub-Principal of King's College, Aberdeen, in 1651.

== In Northumberland ==
From Aberdeen he went to Alnwick to be minister of a Dissenting congregation. After the Restoration he was much molested by local authorities, who tried to force upon him the use of the English Prayer Book.

About 1656 he became perpetual curate of Alnwick, Northumberland. At the Restoration Major Orde, one of the churchwardens, provided a prayer-book.

Rule, however, preached against its use, whereupon Orde indicted him (August 1660) at the Newcastle assizes for depraving the common prayer. Before the trial Orde died by a fall from his horse at Ovingham, Northumberland, and, in the absence of a prosecutor, Rule was acquitted.

== Flight abroad ==
In 1662, he was ejected under the Bartholomew Act. He returned to Scotland, preached for a time in Fife, but incurring the displeasure of the Privy Council, fled to France and Holland. He studied medicine at Leyden, graduating with an MD in 1665. He went on to practise medicine.

In 1672, along with his brother Robert, a presbyterian minister, Rule travelled to Derry, where Robert was installed as minister until 1688. The First Derry Presbyterian Church records say:

"The congregation was vacant in 1670 and abortive attempts were made to induce Scotsmen to come across. Success came when the Rev. Robert Rule of Kirkcaldy and his brother Gilbert the celebrated Principal of Edinburgh came over. Robert accepted a call, was installed in 1672 and remained unmolested in his charge until 1688 when he fled to Scotland and did not return."

== On the East Coast ==
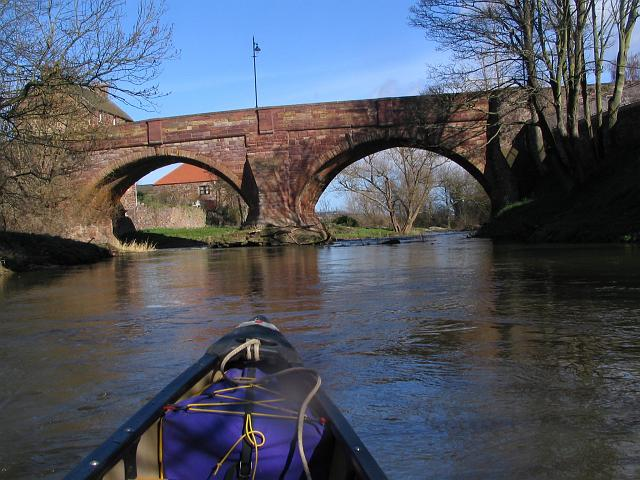
The Auld Brig - East Linton

In 1679 he was in Berwick-on-Tweed, where he was engaged both as a minister and a doctor. He practised with great success at Berwick, preaching at the same time in conventicles, often at much peril. At Linton Bridge, near Prestonkirk, Haddingtonshire, Charles Hamilton, 5th Earl of Haddington, fitted up for him a meeting-house, which was indulged by the privy council on 18 December 1679.

The next year, while visiting his niece, Mrs Kennedy, in Edinburgh, he baptised her child in St Giles' Cathedral after preaching a weekday lecture there, on the invitation of the minister, Archibald Turner, the minister of Old Kirk, St Giles. For this offence Rule was brought before the Privy Council, and imprisoned on the Bass Rock. His health failed, and he was at length discharged, under a bond of five thousand merks to quit the kingdom within eight days. He returned to Berwick, where he evaded arrest by keeping on the English side of the Tweed.

== In Dublin ==
Gilbert served as minister to the presbyterian congregation of Wood Street Church, Dublin from 1682 until 1687, as a colleague of Daniel Williams. At the revolution he became one of the ministers of Greyfriars Kirk.

== Greyfriars and the University of Edinburgh ==
Returning to Scotland, he received a call on 7 December 1688 to the ministry of Greyfriars church, Edinburgh. This was confirmed by the town council on 24 July 1689. Rule in the meantime had been in London, to forward the Presbyterian interest, and had gained the special notice of William III. In 1690 he was appointed by the privy council one of the commissioners for purging the University of Edinburgh, and on the expulsion, in September 1690, of the principal, Alexander Monro, Rule, while retaining his ministerial charge, was made principal by the town council. His predecessor as Principal, Dr Alexander Monro had been ejected for not taking the oath of allegiance to William and Mary, and wrote a work in defence of his faith called "An Enquiry into the New Opinions (chiefly) Propagated by the Presbyterians of Scotland; Together with some Animadversoins on a Late Book entitled 'A defense of the Vindications of the Kirk'; in a Letter to a Friend at Edinburgh". This prompted Gilbert Rule to respond with a book called "The Good Old Way Defended". He came under personal attack for defending Presbyterian principles.

Engaging usually in study until a late hour, he was termed "the Evening Star" (in contrast to his friend, George Campbell, the Professor of Divinity, who was called "the Morning Star"), and was distinguished for great learning, piety, candour, and moderation. He retained both jobs until his death.

He died on 7 June 1701, at the age of 72. He is buried in Greyfriars Churchyard.

== Family ==
He got married on 4 February 1655 to Janet Turnbull (who was buried 7 March 1699), and had children — Gilbert, M.D.; Andrew, advocate, died December 1708; Alexander, Professor of Hebrew at the University of Edinburgh 1694–1702; Rachel; Janet.

Andrew Rule was elected Professor of Hebrew and Semitic Languages at the University of Edinburgh in 1694 during his father's principalship.

== Publications ==
- A Modest Answer to Dr Stilling- fleets Irenicum (London, 1680)
- Historical Representation of the Testimonies of the Church of Scotland (1687)
- A Sermon preached before Parliament from Isaiah ii. 2 (Edinburgh, 1690), and others
- A Rational Defence of Non-Conformity (London, 1689)
- A Vindication of the Church of Scotland (London, 1691)
- A Second Vindication of the Church of Scotland (Edinburgh, 1691)(This and the foregoing are roughly handled in ‘The Scotch Presbyterian Eloquence,’ &c., 1692, 4to.)
- A Defence of the Vindication of the Church of Scotland (Edinburgh, 1694)
- A Sermon preached at the Meeting of Council of George Heriot's Hospital (Edinburgh, 1695)
- The Cyprianick Bishop Examined, and Found Not to be Diocesan (Edinburgh, 1696)
- The Good Old Way Defended (Edinburgh, 1697)
- Discourse of Suppressing Immorality ami Promoting Godliness (Edinburgh, 1701)
- A Vindication of the Purity of Gospel-worship
- A Representation of Presbyterian Government
- Answer to Ten Questions concerning Episcopal and Presbyterian Government.
- two single sermons (1690 and 1701)
- ‘Disputatio … de Rachitide,’ &c., Leyden, 1665, 4to.
- He was one of those who prefaced ‘A Plain and Easy Explication of the … Shorter Catechism,’ &c., 1697, 12mo.
- A broadsheet ‘Elegie’ on his death was published, Edinburgh, 1701

== Bibliography ==
- Hew Scott's Fasti Eccles. Scoticanæ (volumes 1, 2 and 7)
- George Tate's contribution to the Alnwick Mercury in December 1860: The Life of Dr Gilbert Rule
- Calamy's Account, 1713, pp. 514 seq.
- Calamy's Continuation, 1727, ii. 676 seq.
- Wodrow's History of the Kirk (Laing), 1842, iii. 194 seq.
- Armstrong's App. to Martineau's Ordination, 1829, p. 69
- Grant's History of the University of Edinburgh, 1884, i. 239, ii. 256 seq. 288.
- Edin. Comic., Test., and Peg. (Bajrt. and Bur.)
- Wodrow's History, MSS., and Anal.
- Watt's Bibl. Britt., ii.
- Mum. Univ. Glasg., ii.
- S. Presb. Eloq.
- Acts Pari., ix.
- Dictionary of National Biography

Presbyterian Church titles
Preceded by Daniel Williams	Minister of Wood Street Presbyterian Church, Dublin; 1682–1687; With: Daniel Williams,1682-1687; Joseph Boyse,1683-1687	Succeeded by Joseph Boyse
Academic offices
Preceded by Alexander Monro	Principal of Edinburgh University; 1690–1703	Succeeded by William Carstares
