= John Smith (Unitarian) =

English craftsman and writer

John Smith (1647/8–1727?) of St. Augustine's London was an English craftsman and writer, known as "philomath". He was also a Unitarian writer who was coerced into recanting at the height of the 1690s "Socinian controversy".

== Religious views ==
A designed End to the Socinian Controversy: or a rational and plain Discourse that no other person but the Father of Christ is God Most High was published under Smith's own name in 1695 (unusually, since Unitarian contributions in the controversy were typically anonymous). It was attacked in 1696 by Francis Gregory, rector of Hambleden.

Smith was forced to publish a recantation:

"... to the established laws and statutes of the realm — I, John Smith, do hereby declare, that I am very sorry for the same, and wish, with all my heart, I had not either written, or caused to be printed, the said book, asking forgiveness of all such as have been hurt thereby, or justly scandalized thereat, and retracting all pernicious errors and heretical positions contained in the said book. And I do hereby promise, with sincerity and truth, to abstain from all occasions of falling into the like miscarriage as much as in me lies, and to behave myself, for the time to come, as befits an humble, peaceable, modest, and quiet Christian. In witness whereof, I have hereunto set my hand, &c, " John Smith.""

His case is notable in showing how the Act of Toleration 1689 did not extend to Unitarians.

== Works ==
Smith was a clock-maker. He was also the author of:

- ‘Horological Dialogues, in three parts, shewing the nature, use, and right management of Clocks and Watches … by J. S., clockmaker,’ London, 1675. To the same John Smith is also attributed a technical treatise entitled ‘The Art of Painting, wherein is included The whole Art of Vulgar Painting, according to the best and most approved Rules for preparing and laying on of Oyl Colours … with directions for painting Sun Dials and all manner of Timber work,’ London, 1676; the second impression, with alterations and additions, 1687; 4th ed. ‘The Art of Painting in Oyl … to which is now added the Art and Mystery of Colouring Maps and other Prints with Water Colours,’ London, 1705; other editions 1706, 1723; 9th ed. 1788.
- ‘Of the Unequality of Natural Time, with its Reason and Causes. Together with a Table of the True Aequation of Natural Dayes’ &c., London, 1686.
- ‘A Complete Discourse of the Nature, Use, and right managing of that Wonderful instrument the Baroscope or quick silver weather glass,’ London, 1688.
- ‘Horological Disquisitions concerning the Nature of Time,’ &c., London, 1694; 2nd ed. 1708.
- ‘The Curiosities of Common Water, or the advantages thereof in preventing and curing many distempers. Gather'd from the Writings of several Eminent Physicians, and also from more than 40 years' experience,’ London, 1722; 3rd. ed. 1723; 10th ed. curante Ralph Thoresby. This was a compilation from medical writers, such as Sir John Floyer, Joseph Browne, Daniel Duncan, and others, advocating hydropathy and in praise of temperance and common-sense treatment. It had a large circulation in England, was translated into German, and into French as ‘Traité des Vertus de l'Eau commune,’ Paris, 1725; 2nd ed. 1626 [1726]; 3rd ed. 1730.

‘Stereometrie,’ London, 1673, ia attributed to Smith by Thomas Seccombe (DNB), but this is, however, questioned by Anita McConnell (ODNB).
