= James Kirkpatrick (minister) =

Irish presbyterian minister

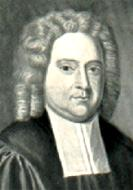
- Died: 1743; Dublin
- Occupation: Presbyterian minister

James Kirkpatrick (died 1743) was an Irish Presbyterian minister. He was also a medical doctor.

== Biography ==
=== Early life ===
Kirkpatrick was the son of Hugh Kirkpatrick, who was minister successively of Lurgan, co. Armagh, Ireland, Dalry and Old Cumnock in Scotland, and Ballymoney, Co. Armagh (where he died in 1712). He was probably born in Scotland while his father was minister there. In February 1691 he matriculated from the university of Glasgow, and in February 1694 his name appears in the university list of students in theology. In 1699 he was ordained as minister of the congregation of Templepatrick, Co. Antrim. The well-known ‘Belfast Society,’ which exercised an important influence on the ecclesiastical affairs of the north of Ireland, was founded in 1705, and Kirkpatrick was one of its earliest and most influential members. In 1706 he resigned his charge at Templepatrick on receiving an invitation from the presbyterian congregation in Belfast to take the place of their minister, John McBride, who had been obliged to retire to Scotland owing to his non-abjuring opinions. Soon afterwards the congregation divided on account of its numbers, and he became minister of the second congregation, a new meeting-house having been built close to the first. He served at the Second Presbyterian Church of Belfast until his death.

In 1712 he was elected moderator of the synod of Ulster. In 1720 he came prominently into notice as one of the leaders of the non-subscribing party in the north of Ireland. In 1725 he was placed with the other non-subscribers in the presbytery of Antrim, which the synod in 1726 excluded from its judicatories.

=== Later years ===
In his later days he took the degree of M.D., and combined the practice of a physician with the work of a clergyman.

He is said to have died suddenly in Dublin, where he had gone on business with his wife. The date of his death is usually given as 1744, but a notice by James Blow, prefixed to Kirkpatrick's posthumous ‘Defence of Christian Liberty,’ shows that he died in 1743. A copy of his portrait is in the vestry of the first presbyterian church in Belfast.

== Works ==
Kirkpatrick is best known by his ‘Historical Essay upon the Loyalty of Presbyterians in Great-Britain and Ireland from the Reformation to this present year 1713, &c.’ (4to, pp. xv, 564, and index of ten pages, no place or printer's name, 1713). This work was undertaken to meet the desire of the general synod to possess a history of their church, and specially called for by the persistent attacks of Tisdall, vicar of Belfast, on the presbyterian body. In particular, the essay stated that Presbyterians in 1713 were not the same as those who had signed the Solemn League and Covenant of 1643, and were not a danger to the government. It preserves many valuable facts and documents, and gives a good idea of the state of public sentiment in Ireland in the days of Queen Anne. It was published anonymously. Kirkpatrick also wrote:

- ‘A Vindication of the Presbyterian Ministers in the North of Ireland, subscribers and non-subscribers, from many gross and groundless aspersions cast upon them in a late scandalous libel entitled “An Account of the Mind of the Synod,”’ Belfast, 1721, 8vo (anon.; by ‘A Lover of Truth and Peace’).
- ‘A Scripture Plea against a fatal rupture and breach of Christian Communion amongst the Presbyterians in the North of Ireland,’ Belfast, 1724, 8vo.
- ‘An Essay upon the Important Question whether there is a Legislative Proper Authority in the Church,’ Belfast, 1731, 8vo (anon.; by several hands, probably edited by Kirkpatrick).
- ‘An Account of the Success of Mrs. Stephens's Medicines for the Stone; in the case of James Kirkpatrick, Doctor of Divinity, M.D., &c.,’ Belfast, 1739, 8vo.
- ‘A Defence of Christian Liberty, by a Member of the General Synod,’ Belfast, 1743, 4to (unfinished).
