= Daniel Williams (theologian) =

British Presbyterian minister (1643-1716)

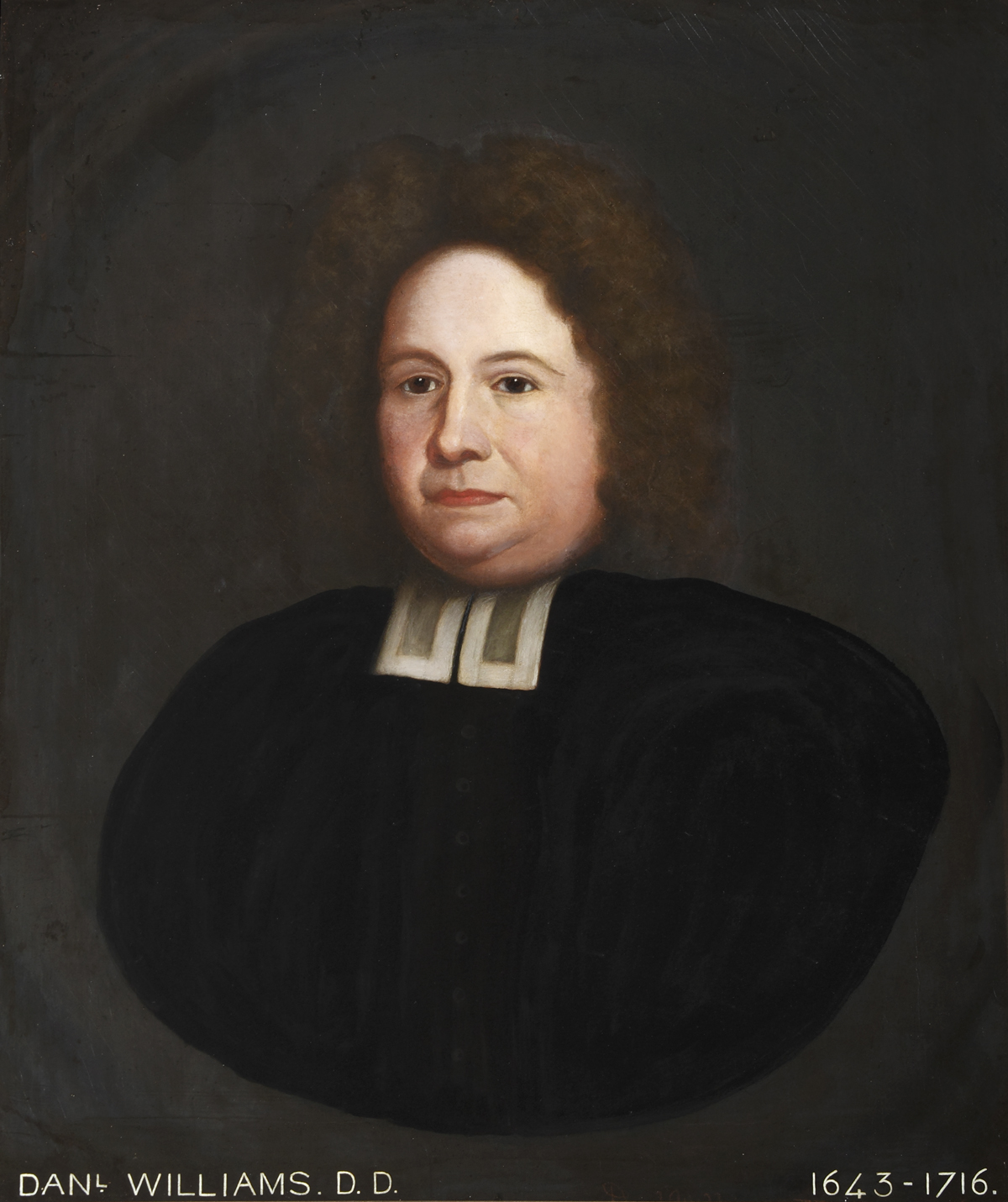

Personal life
- Born: 1643 Wrexham, Denbighshire, Wales
- Died: 26 January 1716 (aged 72–73) Hoxton, London, England

Religious life
- Religion: Christianity (Presbyterianism)

Senior posting
- Based in: Ireland, England and Wales

Daniel Williams (c. 1643 – 26 January 1716) was a British benefactor, minister and theologian, within the Presbyterian tradition, i.e. a Christian outside the Church of England. He is known largely for the legacy he left which led to the creation of Dr Williams's Library in London, a centre for research on English Dissenters.

== Early ministry ==
Williams was born in Wrexham, Denbighshire, Wales, and was a cousin of Stephen Davies, minister at Banbury. He became a preacher by the age of nineteen: details of his education are unknown, though it was probably cut short by his refusing to conform to the state church, Anglicanism, when Charles II was restored to the throne.

He ministered in Ireland from 1664 to 1687. This posting was a result of his accepting an invitation from the Countess of Meath to be her chaplain. He was a regular preacher to Drogheda's joint Presbyterian-Independent congregation (1664–67) and worked with Joseph Boyse and Samuel Marsden at the congregation at Wood Street, Dublin (1667–87). He acted as a peacemaker amongst the Scottish Presbyterians, fiercely opposed Catholicism and helped to maintain the Presbyterians' union with the other Dissenting congregations in Ireland, as well as exorcising a house by prayer in 1678 (as recounted by Richard Baxter).

== London ==
On a new outbreak of the Troubles and after being abandoned by Gilbert Rule (a Scottish exile, and Williams' assistant since 1682), Williams left for London in September 1687. There he became an influential Dissenter, becoming friends with the leading ministers Richard Baxter and John Howe and twice being invited to preach before the Lord Mayor of London, the Independent Sir John Shorter. At a meeting at Howe's house in May 1688 as to the making an address of thanks to James II for his Declaration of Indulgence, Williams opposed any such address since (in his words) "it were better for [the Dissenters] to be reduc'd to their former Hardships, than declare for Measures destructive of the Liberties of their Country" and likely to cause an open split with the Church of England. He refused to be convinced to return to Ireland by the Dublin congregation, and spent the rest of his career in London, where he advised William III on Irish matters.

== Death and legacy ==
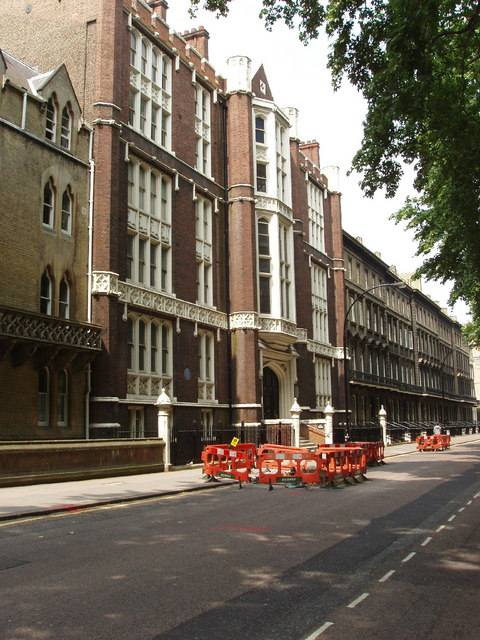
Dr Williams' Library, Gordon Square, in 2007

Williams died in Hoxton, possibly from asthma, and he was buried in a vault at Bunhill Fields. He left almost his whole estate of £50,000 to charity.

He left his books (7600 volumes) and money to establish a library known as Dr Williams's Library, situated in London until its relocation to Manchester in 2025. In addition to its theological holdings, it contains collections of philosophy, history, literature, and other donated collections. The library is known to researchers of history and genealogy for its holdings of pre-19th century material relating to Protestant nonconformity in England.

He also left money to aid the foundation of seven charity schools in North Wales, including Dr Williams' School in Dolgellau, and to provide scholarships to the University of Glasgow for candidates to the ministry in the Nonconformist church.

== Marriages and issue ==
Williams married Elizabeth Juxon in Ireland in 1675 - she died in 1698, and they had had no children. By his second wife Jane Guill (daughter of a refugee Huguenot merchant), whom he married in 1701, he had one son and two daughters.

== Books ==
Williams’ publications include;

- A plea for the antient gospel. Wherein these following points are discussed ... (1697)
- Practical discourses on several important subjects (1738)

== Notes and references ==
- Gordon, Alexander (1900). "Williams, Daniel" . Dictionary of National Biography. Vol. 61. pp. 385–389.
- Wykes, David L. (October 2009) [2004]. "Williams, Daniel". Oxford Dictionary of National Biography (online ed.). Oxford University Press. doi:10.1093/ref:odnb/29491. (Subscription, Wikipedia Library access or UK public library membership required.)

Presbyterian Church titles
Preceded by Samuel Marsden	Minister of Wood Street Presbyterian Church, Dublin; 1667–1687; With: Samuel Marsden, 1667-1677; Gilbert Rule,1682-1687; Joseph Boyse,1683-1687	Succeeded by Joseph Boyse
