= James Blow =

Scottish printer

- Born: 29 July 1676; Scotland
- Died: 16 August 1759 (aged 83); Ireland
- Occupation: Printer

James Blow (29 July 1676 – 16 August 1759) was a Scottish printer in Belfast, Ireland.

== Biography ==
Blow was born on 29 July 1676 in Scotland, possibly in possibly in Culross, Perthshire. He was apprenticed to Patrick Neill, a printer of Glasgow, and when Neill set up the first regular printing establishment in Belfast (before 1694), Blow came with him as an assistant. Blow was Neill's brother-in-law, but in which way is not known. In Neill's will (dated 21 December 1704) he says : "I recommend my son John" [he left also a youngerson, James, and a daughter] "to the care of my brother Blow, to teach him the trade I taught him, and if he keep the printing-house in Belfast, to instruct him in that calling." According to Blow's son Daniel (who died near Dundonald, County Down, in 1810, aged 91) the printing of bibles was begun in Belfast by Blow 'about 1704.' There is a copy of the bible which shows the imprint, "printed by and for James Blow and for George Grierson, printer to the king's most excellent majesty, at the King's Arms and Two Bibles in Essex Street, Dublin, mdccii.," 8vo. But one of the figures of the date has been mutilated, and the true date is mdccli. The bibles of 1751 are Blow's work throughout, but some others purporting to be Blow's bibles are made-up copies, only the title and first sheet being Belfast work, and the remainder Scotch. The patent to print bibles was first given to the Grierson family in 1726 by Lord Carteret, appointed lord-lieutenant on 22 August 1724. George Grierson (who died in 1753, aged 74) married, as his second wife, a daughter of Blow and widow of Francis Cromie, merchant, of Belfast (died December 1731). Bohn, borrowing a note by John Hodgson, in the "Ulster Journal of Archæology," vol. iii. 1855, pp. 76–7, mentions in his edition of "Lowndes," 1804, i. 189, "The Bible, Belfast. James Blood [i.e. Blow], 1716, 8vo. first edition of the Scriptures printed in Ireland," Bohn adds : 'An error occurs in a verse in Isaiah. "Sin no more" is printed "Sin on more." The error was not discovered until the entire impression (8,000 copies) were bound and partly distributed.' Bohn's date is, to say the least, ten years too early; the reference to Isaiah is a manifest error. The earliest book mentioned by Benn as hearing Blow's imprint is the "Works of Sir David Lindsey," 1714, 12mo. But he printed for the presbyterians, and it is probable that some of their publications, without name of place or printer, are by him. James Kirkpatrick's "Historical, Essay upon the Loyalty of Presbyterians," 1713, 4to, the most important of these, is assigned by Benn to Blow; but this is not borne out by the character of the type. In the ecclesiastical contest (1720–7) between the subscribers and non-subscribers to the Westminster Confession, Blow printed for the non-subscribing section. One of the most interesting productions of Blow's press is "The Church Catechism in Irish, with the English placed over against it in the same Karakter," 1722. Blow died on 16 August 1759, and left £40 to the poor in Belfast. His last known publication was Henry Grove's "Discourse concerning the Nature and Design of the Lord's Supper," 4th edition, 1759 (advertised in the "Belfast Newsletter," 2 February) Blow lost two young children in 1717. His son Daniel succeeded him as a printer, and his grandsons founded the paper-making firm of Blow, Ward, & Greenfield. The original wooden press employed by the Blows was in use at Youghal as late as 1824.
