= Louis de Sabran =

French Jesuit chaplain to James II of England (1652–1732)

Louis de Sabran or Lewis Sabran (1 March 1652 – 22 January 1732) was a French Jesuit. He was associated with the court of James II of England and engaged in vigorous theological debates with both Anglican and Puritan spokesmen.

== Early life and education ==
He was born in Paris in 1652 to the Marquis de Sabran of Provence, a French ambassador in London during the Commonwealth who visited the Catholic martyrs Ralph Corbie and John Duckett before their executions. Louis married an English lady, was educated at the English Jesuit College of St. Omer, being ordained in 1679 and admitted to the Society of Jesus in 1688.

== Career ==
In 1687 he was made the royal chaplain to James II. A sermon he preached to the king on August 28 of that year on the invocation of saints led to a pamphlet war with William Gee, a Puritan. He also entered into a controversy with William Sherlock, the Anglican theologian and Dean of St. Paul's. He was the assumed author of Dr. Sherlock Sifted from his Bran and Chaff in 1687, which Sherlock answered. Sabran answered the reply with An Answer to Dr. Sherlock's Preservative and then Dr. Sherlock's Preservative Considered in 1688. That same year he was made the chaplain to the infant Prince of Wales.

When the Glorious Revolution began, Sabran was responsible for getting the prince out of the country. They headed for Portsmouth, but he was then ordered to return to London before being allowed to escape. He disguised himself as an attendant to a group of Polish nobles but was discovered by a crowd and beaten and imprisoned. He was freed from prison, however, by order of the king. Sherlock coincidentally issued a reply to Sabran as the revolution was starting, entitled A Vindication: an Answer to the Cavils of Lewis Sabran.

After returning to France, Sabran was elected to be sent to Rome, Italy to the Vatican by the council of Watten in 1693. He was appointed visitator of the Neapolitan Jesuits, and represented his province at Rome in the congregation of 1693, when the case of Thyrsus González de Santalla was discussed. In 1699, the Prince-Bishop of Liège made him the president of the Diocesan Seminary of Liège to answer charges of Jansenism among the faculty. The bishop had to enforce order with soldiers. Once the crisis was passed, Father Sabran's rule was successful, and he remained there until 1704.

In 1708/09, he was made provincial superior. He then wrote to Father Metcalfe, a Jesuit in the north, about the progress of Jansenism, but his letter was intercepted, and was declared by some to portend that he intended to gain possession of the University of Douai, as he had done that of Liège. A long-drawn and somewhat bitter controversy ensued. From 1712 to 1715 he was the headmaster of St. Omer, where he maintained a devotion to St. Melangell. In 1717 he was made the spiritual father of the English College in Rome. He died in Rome in 1732.

== Legacy ==
The titles of his controversial tracts can be found in Sommervogel's encyclopedia; he is alleged to have written a paper, Artes Bajanae (about 1701), against Jansenism.
