= Hannington Hall =

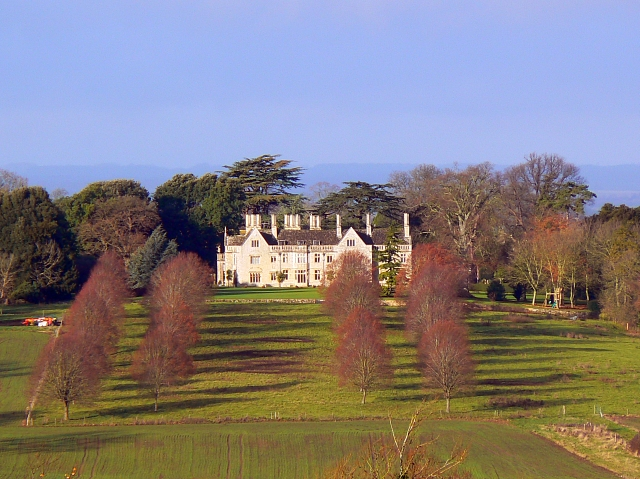

- Location within Wiltshire
- 51°38′13.56″N 1°44′38.4″W
- Location: Hannington, Wiltshire

History
- Built: 1653
- Built for: Freke family

Listed Building – Grade II

Hannington Hall is a Grade II* listed country house in the village of Hannington, Wiltshire, England.

The house was built in 1653 by the Freke family, who had bought the estate in 1605, and possibly incorporates parts of a previous parsonage. The east front is of two and a half storeys in five bays, made of rubble with ashlar dressings. An orangery was added in 1836 and a service wing in 1863. An inscription below the front parapet celebrates the brotherly love of Raufe and William Freke, the sons of Sir Thomas Freke, the original owner. The house has twenty rooms and stands in 340 acres of pasture and woodland.

Associated buildings such as the stable block, a well house, an ice house, and the street wall and gate piers are all Grade II listed structures.

The Hall passed down in the Freke family via Thomas Freke (1660–1721) MP, his Socinian writer brother William Freke, and the Hussey-Freke family.

During the Second World War it was occupied by the female Auxiliary Units' Special Duties Section, known as the "Secret Sweeties", under the command of Senior Commander Beatrice Temple, which was to form part of the British resistance movement in the event of a German invasion.

GWR Hall class locomotive No 5930 was named after the hall.
