= William Freke =

English mystical writer (1662–1744)

William Freke (1662–1744) was an English mystical writer, of Wadham College, Oxford and barrister of the Middle Temple.

Freke first comes to attention as a Socinian Unitarian who suffered at the hands of Parliament in 1694 for his anti-Trinitarian beliefs, and later recanted. William Freke sent his Brief but Clear Confutation of the Doctrine of the Trinity to both Houses of Parliament, was fined and the book burnt. The same happened the next year to John Smith (1695), a clockmaker who had written a similar pamphlet.

In 1703 he published Lingua Tersancta. Or, a Most Sure and Compleat Allegorick Dictionary to the Holy Language of the Spirit. Presumably unbalanced, Freke proclaimed himself the great Elijah in 1709.

== Life ==
A younger son of Thomas Freke or Freeke, he was born at Hannington Hall, Wiltshire; his mother was Cicely, daughter of Robert Hussey of Stourpaine, Dorset. He was at school at Somerford (? Somerford Keynes), Wiltshire, and early in 1677, having attained the age of fourteen, he became a gentleman commoner of Wadham College, Oxford. After two or three years he went to study at the Middle Temple, and was called to the bar, but does not seem to have practised.

He became a reader of 'Arian books' but he continued to attend the services of the Church of England as a silent worshipper, holding schism to be a sin, and believing his conduct to be directed by divine guidance. He studied astrology, but was convinced of its unscientific character. In May 1681, after recovering from smallpox, he had the first of a series of dreams, which he esteemed to be divine monitions. His first volume of essays (1687), 'per Gulielmum Liberam Clavem, i.e. FreeK,' is an attempt to moderate between 'our present differences in church and state.' A second volume of essays (1693) had a plan for a 'Lapis Errantium; or the Stray-Office: For all manner of things lost, found or mislaid within the weekly bills of mortality of the city of London.' He gives tables of rates to regulate the reward payable to the finder and the fee to the office for safe custody.

About the beginning of December 1693 he printed an antitrinitarian tract containing a 'dialogue' and a 'confutation.' This he sent by post to members of both Houses of Parliament. From the style it was supposed to be the work of a Quaker. The Commons on 13 December 1693, and the Lords on 3 January 1694, voted the pamphlet an infamous libel, and ordered it to be burned by the hangman in Old Palace Yard, Westminster. Freke was arraigned at the King's Bench on 12 February by the attorney-general. He pleaded not guilty, and the trial was deferred till the next term. On 19 May he was condemned to pay a fine of £500, to make a recantation in the four courts of Westminster Hall, and to find security for good behaviour during three years.

In 1703 he describes himself as 'master in the holy language' and 'author of the New Jerusalem,' a work (printed about 1701) which has not been traced. His 'Divine Grammar' and 'Lingua Tersancta' have no publisher, and only the author's initials ('W. F. Esq.') are given. He expounds his dreams, furnishing classified lists of their topics and interpretations. The 'Lingua Tersancta' is in fact a dictionary of dreams, in which the language is often as coarse as the images. He adhered to his conviction of the divine authority of bishops and of the scriptures; all other religious tenets being of secondary moment.

In 1709 he renounced Arianism (Great Elijah, i. 4), and gave himself out as 'the great Elijah,' a new prophet and 'secretary to the Lord of hosts.'He ate sparingly, and claimed divine approval for his evening potations. He advertised and gave away his books. In 1714 he became acquainted with the works of Arise Evans; he also read John Pordage.

Freke spent the latter part of his life (apparently from 1696) at Hinton St Mary, Dorset, where he acted (from about 1720) as justice of the peace. He died at Hinton, surviving his elder brother, Thomas, who left no issue. He was buried on 2 January 1745.

== Works ==
He printed:

- 'Essays towards a Union of Divinity and Morality, Reason or Natural Religion and Revelation,’ &c., 1687 (eight parts).
- 'Select Essays, tending to the Universal Reformation of Learning,’ &c., 1693.
- 'A Dialogue ... concerning the Deity' and 'A Brief and Clear Confutation of the Doctrine of the Trinity,’ 1693.
- 'The Divine Grammar … leading to the more nice Syntax … of Dreams, Visions, and Apparitions,’ &c., 1703, (a second title is 'The Fountain of Monition and Intercommunion Divine,’ &c.; at p. 162 is a section with separate title, 'The Pool of Bethesda Watch'd,’ &c.; at p. 213 begins 'The Alphabet,’ a dream-dictionary; at p. 264 are a few original verses).
- 'Lingua Tersancta; or, a … compleat Allegorick Dictionary to the Holy Language of the Spirit,’ &c., 1703, 8vo (it has a dedication to the Almighty); 1705.
- 'The Great Elijah's First Appearance,’ &c., lib. i. 1709; 2nd vol., containing lib. ii. and lib. iii., 1710, 8vo (has his full name).
- 'God Everlasting … or The New Jerusalem Paradise-State,’ &c., 1719; two books, each in two parts, followed by 'The Prophetick Foreknowledge of the Weather' (anon.)

Besides these he mentions that he had printed the following works:

- 'The New Jerusalem Vision Interpretation,’ 1701, or beginning of 1702.
- 'General Idea of the Allegorick Language,’ 1702. 'Carmel Aphorisms,’ 1715.

He prepared for the press, and probably printed:

- 'Oracula Sacra,’ 1711. 12. 'The Elijan King Priest and Prophet State,’ 1712.

== Family ==
He married Elizabeth Harris, with whom he does not seem to have lived very happily; they had twelve children, of whom eight were living in 1709. Four sons survived him: Raufe (d. 1757); Thomas (d. 1762); John (d. 1761), from whom the family of Hussey-Freke of Hannington Hall were descended; and Robert.
