= John Abernethy (minister) =

Irish presbyterian minister and church leader (1680–1740)

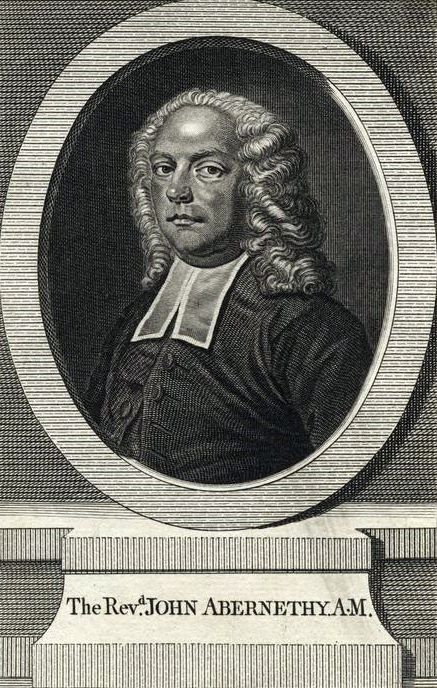
Abernethy

John Abernethy (19 October 1680 – 1 December 1740) was an Irish Presbyterian minister and church leader.

== Life ==
He was born at Coleraine, County Londonderry, where his father John was a Presbyterian minister. John Abernethy Senior accompanied Patrick Adair on a deputation from the general committee of Ulster presbyterians, who presented a congratulatory address to William III in London 1689, and obtained from the king a letter (9 November 1689) recommending their case to Duke Schomberg.

In his thirteenth year, John Abernethy Junior entered the University of Glasgow, and on concluding his course there went on to Edinburgh, where he soon moved into the most cultured circles. Returning home, he was licensed to preach from his Presbytery before he was twenty-one. In 1701 he was called to accept charge of an important congregation in Antrim; after an interval of two years, mostly spent in further study in Dublin, he was ordained there on 8 August 1703. He became a noted debater in the synods and assemblies of his church and a leading evangelist. He has been described as being at this time "the young minister of Antrim ... a man of studious habits, heretical opinions, and remarkable ability."

In 1712, he was devastated by the loss of his wife (Susannah Jordan). Five years later, he was invited to the congregation of Usher's Quay, Dublin, and also to what was called the Old Congregation of Belfast. The synod assigned him to Dublin. After careful consideration, he refused and remained at Antrim. This refusal aroused disapproval, and controversy followed, Abernethy standing firm for religious freedom and repudiating the ecclesiastical courts. The controversy and quarrel bear the name of the two camps in the conflict, the "Subscribers" and the "Non-subscribers." Abernethy and his associates sowed the seeds of the struggle (1821–1840) in which, under the leadership of Dr Henry Cooke, the Arian and Socinian elements of the Irish Presbyterian Church were thrown out.

Much of what he contended for, and which the "Subscribers" opposed bitterly, was silently granted in the lapse of time. In 1726, the "Non-subscribers" were cut off, with due ban and solemnity, from the Irish Presbyterian Church. In 1730 he moved to Wood Street, Dublin, succeeding Rev. Joseph Boyse. It was said of him that, although a "Non-subscriber," he was a Trinitarian. However, Dr Henry Cooke stated that Arianism "made very considerable progress under the patronage of high names, as Abernethy, the author of a very excellent work upon the Attributes, who gave it a great deal of eclat". In 1731 came the greatest controversy in which Abernethy was involved. It was nominally about the Test Act, but actually on the entire question of tests and disabilities. His stand was:

against all laws that, upon account of mere differences of religious opinions and forms of worship, excluded men of integrity and ability from serving their country.

He was nearly a century in advance of his age. He had to reason with those who denied that a Roman Catholic or Dissenter could be a "man of integrity and ability."

Presbyterian Church titles
Preceded by Richard Choppin; Joseph Boyse	Minister of Wood Street Presbyterian Church, Dublin; 1730–1740; With: Richard Choppin	Succeeded by Richard Choppin
