= Thomas Emlyn =

English minister

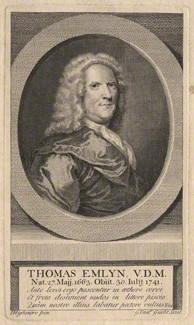
Thomas Emlyn, V.D.M.

Thomas Emlyn (1663–1741) was an English Nonconformist Unitarian theologian.

== Life ==
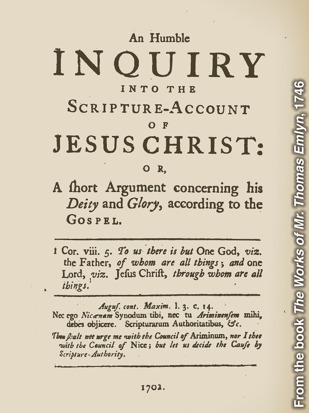

Emlyn was born at Stamford, Lincolnshire. He later served as chaplain to the Letitia, the Presbyterian countess of Donegal, who was the daughter of Sir William Hicks, 1st Baronet. Letitia married Arthur Chichester, 1st Earl of Donegall, in 1651 and outlived him.

After serving as chaplain to Sir Robert Rich, Emlyn went on to become a colleague to Joseph Boyse, a Presbyterian minister in Dublin, in 1691. However, his tenure was cut short due to his own confession of Unitarianism, and for publishing An Humble Inquiry into the Scripture Account of Jesus Christ in 1702. As a result, he was sentenced to a year's imprisonment for blasphemy and fined £1000. It wasn't until more than two years later (thanks to the intervention of Boyse), he was released in 1705 upon payment of £90.

Emlyn is credited as being the first English preacher to openly identify himself as "Unitarian." In his diary, he reflects, "I thank God that He did not call me to this lot of suffering till I had arrived at maturity of judgment and firmness of resolution, arid that He did not desert me when my friends did. He never let me be so cast down as to renounce the truth or to waver in my faith." Regarding Christ, Emlyn writes, "We may regard with fervent gratitude so great a benefactor, but our esteem and rational love must ascend higher and not rest till it centre in his God and ours."

In his later years, Emlyn preached a good deal in Paul's Alley, Barbican. He died in London in 1741.

== Works ==
Emlyn's Works were collected by his son Sollom Emlyn in 1746, 3 vols., called the "fourth edition", but this refers only to the included Collection of Tracts (1719; 1731, 2 vols.; 1742, 2 vols.). His first publication was The Suppression of Public Vice, Dublin, 1698, (sermon on 1 Sam. ii. 30). Among his other pieces are:

- The Case of Mr. E—— in relation to the Difference between him and some Dissenting Ministers of the City of Dublin, &c., London [August] 1702, Dublin, 1703.
- An Humble Inquiry into the Scripture Account of Jesus Christ, &c., Dublin, 1702 (anon.; the printer, Laurence, swore "he knew not whose writing it was").
- A Vindication of the Worship of the Lord Jesus Christ, on Unitarian Principles, &c., 1706 (anon.; written 1704).
- General Remarks on Mr. Boyse's Vindication of the True Deity of our Blessed Saviour, &c. (written 1704; sent to England and mislaid; first printed in Works).
- Remarks on Mr. Charles Leslie's First Dialogue, &c., 1708 (anon.; in this, anticipating Clarke, he calls himself "a true scriptural Trinitarian"; he wrote two other tracts against Charles Leslie in the same year).
- The Previous Question to the Several Questions about ... Baptism, &c., 1710 (anon.; answered by Grantham Killingworth and Caleb Fleming).
- A Full Inquiry into the Original Authority of that Text, 1 John v. 7, &c., 1715 (the controversy with David Martin lasted till 1722; each wrote three pieces).
- A True Narrative of the Proceedings ... against Mr. Thomas Emlyn; and of his Prosecution, &c., 1719 (dated September 1718); latest edition, 1829.
- Sermons, 8vo, 1742 (with new title-page, forms vol. iii. of Works).
- Memoirs of the Life and Sentiments of the Reverend Dr. Samuel Clarke (written 1731; first printed in Works). Also controversial tracts against Willis (1705), Sherlock (1707), Bennet (1718), Tong and others (1719), George Trosse (1719), and Daniel Waterland (1731).

In 1823 Jared Sparks published at Boston, U.S., a selection from Emlyn's works, with memoir. Answers to Emlyn's positions were furnished by Stephen Nye (1715), Jacques Abbadie (1719), C. Alexander (1791), and Aaron Burr Sr., president of the college in New Jersey (1757), on occasion of an American edition (1790) of extracts from the 'Humble Inquiry.'

== Notes ==
Attribution:

Presbyterian Church titles
| Preceded by Joseph Boyse | Minister of Wood Street Presbyterian Church, Dublin; 1691–1702; With: Joseph Boyse | Succeeded by Joseph Boyse; Richard Choppin |
