= Alexander Monro (educator) =

Alexander Monro (1648–1698) was the Principal of the University of Edinburgh from 1685 to 1690.

== Life ==
Alexander Monro was fourth son of Isobel, daughter of Robert Munro, 6th of Coul, 5th of Balconie, and her husband, Hugh Munro, 4th laird of Fyresh. He was the first of his branch of the family to spell his name Monro as opposed to Munro. He studied for the Church at St Salvator's College at the University of St Andrews, graduating with an MA in 1664. He then accompanied, while aged 17, his cousin Lieutenant Colonel Alexander Munro, who was Colonel of Horse in Lord Dumbarton's Regiment (and also a captain in the Royal Scots, 1st Foot Regiment) to France. Alexander Monro saw active service there for two and a half years, before returning to Scotland to complete his education. He resumed studies at St Mary's College (now New College), St Andrews, and graduated MA from there in 1669.

He was ordained as a minister in the Church of Scotland in 1673, and on 7 April 1673 he was admitted to the second charge in Dunfermline, housed in Dunfermline Abbey. On 26 March 1676 he was translated to Kinglassie in Fife and on 26 April 1678 was translated to the parish of Wemyss. He resigned before March 1683, having been nominated as Professor of Divinity at St Mary's College, St Andrews, by the then Chancellor Archbishop James Sharp of St Andrews. From 1682 to 1685 he was Principal of the University of St Andrews. In February 1682 he was awarded an honorary Doctor of Divinity (DD) by the University of St Andrews.

On 9 December 1685 Alexander Monro was appointed Principal of the University of Edinburgh, being simultaneously appointed by the Town Council of Edinburgh to the Second Charge of the High Church of Edinburgh (St Giles Cathedral), and inducted on 30 December 1685. As Principal of the University of Edinburgh he received an emolument of 2000 merks and as incumbent of the High Church he received 1600 merks. In 1688 James II of England (VII of Scotland) attempted to have him appointed as Bishop of Argyll, but this fell through as James left the throne. Monro was tried by the Privy Council for refusing to pray for William III and Mary II in disobedience of the Act of Estates passed on 13 April 1689. Although not ejected by the Privy Council he nevertheless resigned as Principal of the University of Edinburgh and from his charge in the north-eastern division of St Giles Cathedral on 24 April 1689. He thus resigned before episcopacy was abolished by the Scottish Parliament on 22 July 1689.

On 20 September 1690 he was formally deprived of his Principalship by the Committee of Visitors (which had been appointed by Act of Parliament in July 1690 with wide-ranging powers while visiting Universities, Colleges and Schools). The reason given was his disapproval of the Revolution Settlement (see Glorious Revolution) as a nonjuror. In addition he was accused of Socinianism and Arminianism. After his resignations in 1690 he acted as a minister for an Episcopalian congregation in Edinburgh for about two years. Subsequently, he moved to London in 1691, living in or near Swallow Street. He died in London in 1698, aged 50.

== Works ==
Monro wrote a work in defence of his faith called An Enquiry into the New Opinions (chiefly) Propagated by the Presbyterians of Scotland; Together with some Animadversions on a Late Book entitled 'A defense of the Vindications of the Kirk'; in a Letter to a Friend at Edinburgh. This prompted his successor as Principal of the University of Edinburgh, Gilbert Rule, to respond with a book called The Good Old Way Defended.

== Family ==
Monro married firstly Anna Logan on 6 May 1673; she came from Aberdour in Fife and died on 16 May 1674 a few weeks after childbirth. Together they had one daughter, Anna Monro; born 19 March 1674 in Dunfermline, died 1688.

Monro married secondly Marion Collace on 11 April 1676 at Inverkeithing. She was the daughter, it is believed, of Rev. Andrew Collace, who served as minister of Garvoch (1615), of St Cyres (1617), and of Dundee (1635–39). She survived her husband by 17 years, remaining in London. Their children were

- Elizabeth Monro; born 26 June 1677; married her cousin Capt. George Papley.
- David Monro; born 1679, in Wemyss manse; died young.
- Dr James Monro, FRCP; 1680–1747; a physician and founder of a noted family of doctors connected with Bedlam (Bethlem Hospital).
- Margaret, James' twin
- Five daughters dying in infancy or early youth and all before 1690.

== Sources ==
- History of the Munros of Fowlis by Alexander Mackenzie, privately published, 1898, Inverness. A copy of this book is available in the library of the University of Edinburgh, as well as online.

Academic offices
Preceded by Andrew Cant	Principals of Edinburgh University; 1685–1690	Succeeded by Gilbert Rule
