= Patrick Adair =

Patrick Adair (1625?–1694) was an Irish Presbyterian minister, notable for his part in negotiations with government for religious liberty and settlement through his career.

== Biography ==
Rev. Patrick Adair was of the family of Adair of Galloway, originally Irish (Fitzgeralds of Adare). He is usually treated as son of Rev. William Adair of Ayr (who administered the solemn league and covenant in Ulster 1644), but was probably the third son of Rev. John Adair of Genoch, Galloway. He was eyewitness, 'being a boy,' of the scene in Edinburgh High Church, 23 July 1637, when stools were flung at the dean and bishop on the introduction of the service-book. This places his birth about 1625.

He entered divinity classes of Glasgow College in December 1644, and was ordained at Cairncastle, County Antrim, 7 May 1646, by the "army presbytery" constituted in Carrickfergus 10 June 1642 by the chaplains of the Scottish regiments in Ulster. In 1648 Adair and his patron, James Shaw of Ballygally, were appointed on a committee to treat with General Monk and Sir Charles Coote, the parliamentary generals in Ulster, for the establishment of Presbyterianism in those parts. But, on the beheading of Charles I, the Presbyterian ministers of Antrim and Down (Milton's "blockish presbyters of Clanneboye") broke with the parliament and held a meeting in Belfast (February 1649), at which they protested against the king's death as an act of horror without precedent in history 'divine or human,' and agreed to pray for Charles II, who, for his part, promised to establish Presbyterianism in Ulster. The parliamentary generals replaced the Presbyterian by Independent and Baptist ministers, and Adair had to hide among the rocks near Cairncastle.

In March 1652 he took part in a public discussion on church government between Presbyterian and Independent ministers at Antrim Castle. He was the mouthpiece of the ministers who declined (October and November 1652) to take the engagement to be true to the commonwealth against any king, and was one of two ministers appointed to wait on General Fleetwood and the council in Dublin (January 1653) to seek relief therefrom. Being told that Roman Catholics might plead conscience as well as they, Adair drew a famous distinction between the consciences of the parties, 'for papist consciences could digest to kill Protestant kings.' No relief was obtained, and commissioners were sent from Dublin in April to search the houses of such ministers as had not sought safety in flight. Adair's papers were seized, but restored to him through the daring act of a servant-maid at Larne.

The commissioners devised a plan for transplanting the Ulster Presbyterians to Tipperary, but the scheme was abortive; and in April and May 1654 we find Adair in Dublin pleading for the restoration of tithes to the Presbyterian ministers, and obtaining instead a maintenance by annual salary (the first donum to Irish Presbyterians). They got £100 a year apiece till the Restoration, but preserved their independence, not observing the commonwealth fasts and thanksgivings.

Adair was one of eight ministers summoned to the general convention at Dublin, February 1660, at a time when there were hopes of a Presbyterian establishment, soon dispelled by the restoration of Charles II. Jeremy Taylor, consecrated bishop of Down and Connor 27 January 1661, summoned the Presbyterian ministers to his visitation, and on their not attending declared their churches vacant. Thus Adair was ejected from Cairncastle parish church. He went to Dublin to seek relief for his brethren from the Duke of Ormond, Lord Lieutenant of Ireland, but could obtain only permission for them to "serve God in their own families".

In 1663 he was apprehended and sent to Dublin on a charge of complicity in Blood's plot, but discharged after three months with a temporary indulgence on condition of living peaceably. About 1668 a meeting-house was built for him at Cairncastle. Adair was one of the negotiators in 1672 for the first regium donum granted to Presbyterians by Charles II.

On 13 October 1674 the Antrim meeting removed Adair to Belfast, in succession to Rev. William Keyes (an Englishman), not without opposition from the Donegal family, who favoured the English rather than the Scottish type of Presbyterianism. After the defeat of the Scottish covenanters at Bothwell Brig (June 1679) fresh severities were inflicted on the Ulster Presbyterians; their meeting-houses were closed and their presbytery meetings held secretly by night. James II's Declaration of Indulgence (1687) gave them renewed liberty, which was confirmed by the accession of William III, though there was no Irish toleration act till 1719. Adair and John Abernethy (the father of Rev. John Abernethy) headed the deputation from the general committee of Ulster Presbyterians, who presented a congratulatory address to William III in London 1689, and obtained from the king a letter (9 November 1689) recommending their case to Duke Schomberg. William, when in Ulster in 1690, appointed Adair and his son William two of the trustees for distributing his regium donum.

Late in life he drew up A True Narrative of the Rise and Progress of the Presbyterian Government in the North of Ireland, extending from 1623 to 1670, which it is to be regretted that he did not finish. For the religious history of the period it is invaluable.

Adair died in 1694, probably at its close, as his will was proved 6 July 1695. He married first his cousin Jean (died 1675), second daughter of Sir Robert Adair of Ballymena; second, a widow, Elizabeth Anderson (née Martin). He left four sons, William (ordained at Ballyeaston 1681, removed to Antrim 1690, and died 1698), Archibald, Alexander, and Patrick (minister at Carrickfergus, died June 1717, and a daughter Helen.
