= Robert South =

English churchman

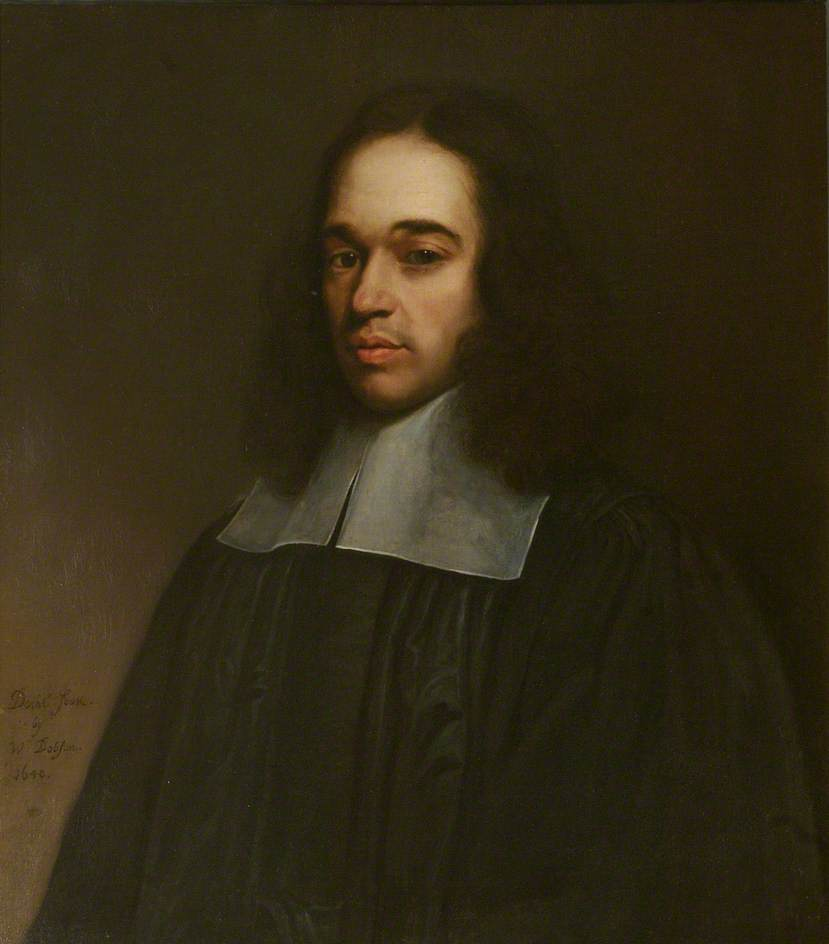
Robert South by William Dobson.

Robert South (4 September 1634 – 8 July 1716) was an English churchman who was known for his combative preaching and Latin poetry.

== Early life ==
South was the son of Robert South, a London merchant, and Elizabeth Berry. He was born at Hackney, Middlesex, and was educated at Westminster School under Richard Busby, and at Christ Church, Oxford, matriculating on 11 December 1651.

Among South's college exercises was a panegyric on Oliver Cromwell in Latin verse on the conclusion of peace at the end of the First Anglo-Dutch War (5 April 1654). He commenced his B.A. on 24 February 1654–5. On account of his using the Book of Common Prayer John Owen, then Dean of Christ Church and vice-chancellor, unsuccessfully opposed his proceeding M.A. on 12 June 1657. South travelled on the continent, and in 1658 privately received episcopal ordination, perhaps from Thomas Sydserf. He was incorporated M.A. at Cambridge in 1659. His assize sermon at St. Mary's on 24 July 1659 was an attack on the Independents, with a sample of the humour for which South became famous. In his university sermon on 29 July 1660 he included the Presbyterians in his invective, referring to Henry Wilkinson as 'Holderforth.'

== Under Charles II ==
South was chosen to be public orator to the university on 10 August 1660, an office which he held till 1677. Edward Hyde, 1st Earl of Clarendon made South his chaplain, in consequence of his oration on his installation as chancellor (15 November). On 30 March 1663, he was installed as prebendary of Westminster. On 1 Oct. 1663, he was created B.D. and D.D. on letters from Clarendon. The creation was opposed in convocation by those who considered South a time-server. On a scrutiny, Nathaniel Crew, the senior proctor, declared the majority to be for South, who was presented by John Wallis. He was incorporated D.D. at Cambridge in 1664. Clarendon gave him in 1667 the sinecure rectory of Llanrhaiadr-y-Mochnant, Denbighshire, and on Clarendon's fall, at the end of that year, he became chaplain to James, Duke of York.

South's ridicule of the Royal Society, in an oration at the dedication of the Sheldonian Theatre, July 1669, called forth a remonstrance from Wallis, addressed to Robert Boyle. South was installed canon of Christ Church on 29 Dec. 1670.

A zealous advocate of the doctrine of passive obedience, South strongly opposed the Toleration Act, frequently speaking sharply against the various Nonconformist sects. In 1676, he was appointed chaplain to Lawrence Hyde, Earl of Rochester, ambassador-extraordinary to the king of Poland, and he sent an account of his visit to Edward Pococke in a letter, dated Dantzic, 16 December 1677, which was printed along with South's Posthumous Works in 1717. In 1678 he was presented to the rectory of Islip, Oxfordshire.

South lived at Caversham, near Reading, Berkshire, where he had an estate. He was chaplain in ordinary to Charles II, but had no other preferment from him than the Westminster prebend.

== Under James II ==
During King James II's reign, Rochester, then lord-lieutenant of Ireland, is said to have offered South an Irish archbishopric (Cashel was vacant, 1685–91). Rochester nominated South (November 1686) as one of two Anglican divines to discuss points of doctrine with two of the church of Rome; but James objected to South, and Simon Patrick was substituted.

== Under William and Mary ==
South hesitated to transfer his allegiance during the Glorious Revolution, being under the influence of William Sherlock according to White Kennett. He at length took the oath, adopting the parliamentary fiction that James's flight constituted an abdication. He is said to have declined a bishopric vacated by a nonjuror. He opposed the scheme for a comprehension of dissenters, but was not a member either of the royal commission (13 September 1689) on the subject, or of the convocation of that year.

In 1693 South intervened anonymously in the Socinian controversy, with strong animus against Sherlock, his Animadversions on Dr Sherlock's Book, entitled a Vindication of the Holy and Ever Blessed Trinity (1690) being 'humbly offered to his admirers, and to himself the chief of them.' He made galling references to Sherlock's career, 'tainted with a conventicle' at the outset; vehemently assailed his earlier writings as heterodox on the doctrine of atonement, and maintained his 'new notion' of the Trinity to be tritheistic; an opinion reiterated in his ''Tritheism Charged upon Dr Sherlock's New Notion of the Trinity, and the Charge Made Good (1695). The anonymity of these attacks was transparent. It is not certain that South was the translator of A Short History of Valentinus Gentilis the Tritheist (1696) from the Latin of Benedict Aretius; the dedication to the hierarchy is in his manner, and there is a reference to Gentilis in Tritheism Charged. p. 47. South's position was mainly that of Wallis, but he chiefly devoted his learning to demolishing Sherlock. Public judgment on the controversy was expressed in William Pittis's ballad, 'The Battle Royal'. The controversy was carried into the pulpit and made for such sharp feelings that the king interposed to stop it.

== Under Queen Anne ==
During the greater part of Queen Anne's reign, South's health was poor and so remained comparatively quiet. He roused himself in 1710 to take part on the High Church side in the affair of Henry Sacheverell. Upon the death (20 May 1713) of Thomas Sprat, the bishopric of Rochester and deanery of Westminster were offered to him; but he turned them down. He died at Westminster on 8 July 1716 and was buried in Westminster Abbey. South gave orders that his ashes should rest near those of Richard Busby. At the south wall of the sanctuary stands a large monument of white marble with a reclining figure, right arm on a cushion, and hand on a skull, and a closed book in the left. The background is framed by two fluted Corinthian column, on either side of an inscription tablet, surmounted by a glory, and two cherubs on drapery. On the cornice is an armorial cartouche decorated with floral festoons, between two flaming urns.

== Works ==
South published a large number of sermons, that first appeared in a collected form in 1692 in six volumes, reaching a second edition in his lifetime in 1715. There have been several later issues; one in two volumes, with a memoir (Henry George Bohn, 1845).

His Opera posthuma Latina, including his will, his Latin poems (among them the at South's time well-known witty poem Musica incantans about the power of music), and his orations while public orator, with memoirs of his life, appeared in 1717. An edition of his works in 7 volumes was published at Oxford in 1823, another in 5 vols in 1842.

South was praised for his wit, though Mark Noble wrote that during one sermon to Charles II, the entire congregation fell asleep. "Stopping and changing the tone of his voice, he called thrice to Lord Lauderdale, who, awakened, stood up: 'My Lord', says South very composedly, 'I am sorry to interrupt your repose, but I must beg that you will not snore quite so loud, lest you should awaken his majesty', and then as calmly continued his discourse", wrote Noble.
