= Samuel Boyse =

Irish poet (c. 1708–1749)

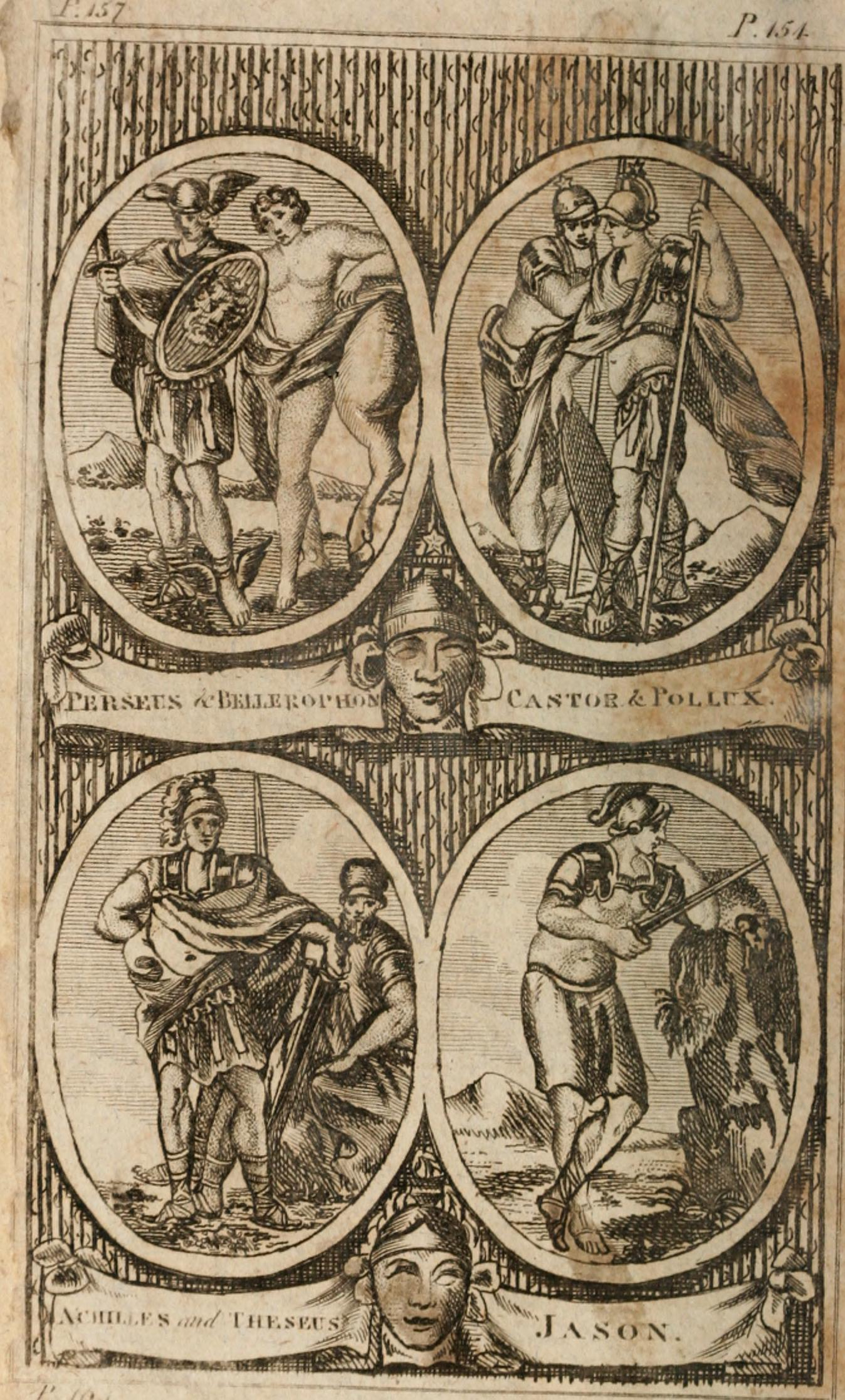
The Pantheon, by Samuel Boyse.

Samuel Boyse (1708? – May 1749) was an Irish poet and writer who worked for Sir Robert Walpole and whose religious verses in particular were prized and reprinted in his time.

== Life ==
Born in Dublin, Boyse was the son of Joseph Boyse, a Presbyterian minister. He studied in Dublin, then Glasgow University; he had no profession other than writer, a career which took him to Edinburgh and London. He married at the age of 20.

Boyse "had many brilliant opportunities for advancement, all of which he wasted by almost inexplicable recklessness", according to William Lloyd Phelps. "Debts at length drove him from Edinburgh. He often had to beg for the smallest coins, and wrote verses in bed to obtain money for clothes and food.".

Boyse became a regular contributor to Gentleman's Magazine, where he wrote under the pen names "Alcaeus" and "Y". Boyse was patronised by Sir Robert Walpole, but later fell into poverty during the latter part of his life. He was sometimes regarded as dissolute, sometimes as insane.

His religious verse was valued, and his poetry was collected and reprinted. He died of consumption, although the circumstances of his death have been disputed.

== Bibliography ==
- 1731: Translations and Poems Written on Several Subjects, Edinburgh
- 1732: Verses Occasioned by Seeing the Palace and Park of Dalkeith
- 1735: Verses Sacred to the Memory of the Right Honourable Charles Earl of Peterborough and Monmouth
- 1736: The Tears of the Muses: A Poem Sacred to the Memory of the Right Honourable Anne, late Viscountess of Stormont
- 1737: The Olive: An Ode Occasion'd by the Auspicious Success of his Majesty's Counsels, in the Stanza of Spencer, London: R. Amey (reprinted in Translations and Poems 1738)
- 1739: The Deity: A Poem, influenced by Alexander Pope's Essay on Man
- 1740: An Ode sacred to the Birth of the Marquis of Tavistock., Gentleman's Magazine, No. 10 (February 1740) 83–84
- 1740: The Character and Speech of Cosroes the Mede: an Improvement of the Squire's Tale of Chaucer., Gentleman's Magazine No. 10 (August) pp 404–5
- 1741: With others, The Canterbury Tales of Chaucer, Modernis'd by Several Hands., three volumes, edited by George Ogle, including Boyse's Cambuscan, or the Squire's Tale
- 1741: The Vision of Patience, an Allegorical Poem., published in A Select Collection of Poems: with Notes, biographical and historical: and a complete Poetical Index. 8 Volumes, edited by John Nichols
- 1743: Albion's Triumph. An Ode, occasioned by the happy Success of His Majesty's Arms on the Maine. In the Stanza of Spencer., modelled on Matthew Prior's Ode to the Queen 1706; London: J. Robinson, 8 pages; five stanzas of the poem were also published this year in Gentleman's Magazine No. 13 (July) p 358
- 1743: The Praise of Peace: A Poem in Three Cantos from the Dutch of Mr. Van Haren
- 1743: To Mr. Urban, on the Conclusion of his Vol. XIII for the Year 1743. Ode., published in Gentleman's Magazine, No. 13, January; "Mr. Urban" refers to Edward Cave, editor of the magazine
- 1747: An Historical Review of the Transactions of Europe, two volumes
- 1748: Impartial History of the Late Rebellion in 1745
- 1748: Irene, an Heroic Ode in the Stanza of Spenser., three Prior stanzas published as a sample of a heroic ode to celebrate the Treaty of Aix la Chapelle and the end of the War of the Austrian Succession; published in Gentleman's Magazine No. 18 (November) p 517 (reprinted this year in Newcastle General Magazine, 1 November, p 581)
- 1749: Translation, A Demonstration of the Existence of God
- 1750: Translation, The Tablature of Cebes
- 1753: The New Pantheon: or the Fabulous History of the Heathen Gods
- 1757: Poetical Works (later editions 1773, 1785)

== See also ==
- Susanna Montgomery, Lady Eglinton
