= Francis Gregory (divine) =

- Born: 1625
- Died: 1707 (aged 81–82)
- Occupation: Divine

Francis Gregory (c.1625 – 1707) was an English divine and schoolmaster.

== Early life ==
Gregory, born about 1625, was a native of Woodstock, Oxfordshire. He was educated at Westminster School under Busby, who, as he afterwards said, was not only a master but a father to him, and in 1641 was elected to a scholarship at Trinity College, Cambridge, graduating M.A. in 1648. He returned to Westminster School as usher till he was appointed head-master of the grammar school at Woodstock.

== Teaching career ==
He was a successful teacher, and numbered among his pupils several sons of noble families. An ardent royalist he was chosen to preach the thanksgiving sermon for the Restoration at St. Mary's, Oxford, 27 May 1660, and afterwards published it under the title of 'David's Return from Banishment.' He also published 'Votivum Carolo, or a Welcome to his sacred Majesty Charles II from the Master and Scholars of Woodstock School,' a volume of English and Latin verses composed by Gregory and his pupils.

Shortly afterwards he became head-master of a newly founded school at Witney, Oxfordshire, and 22 Sept. 1661 he was incorporated D.D. of Oxford University from St. Mary Hall. He was appointed a chaplain to the King, and in 1671 was presented by Earl Rivers to the living of Hambleden, Buckinghamshire. He. kept this post till his death in 1707. He was buried in the church, where a tablet was erected to his memory.

== Published works ==
- 'Έτυμολογικòν μικρòν, sive Etymologicum parvum ex magno illo Sylburgii, Eustathio Martinio, aliisque magni nominis auctoribus excerptum,' 1654, practically a Greek-Latin lexicon.
- 'Instructions concerning the Art of Oratory, for the Use of Schools,' 1659.
- 'Όνομαστικὸν βραχύ, sive Nomenclatura brevis Anglo-Latino-Græca,' 1675, a classified vocabulary, which reached a thirteenth edition in 1695. Each of these works was published for use at Westminster School.
- 'The Triall of Religions, with cautions against Defection to the Roman,' 1674.
- 'The Grand Presumption of the Romish Church in equalling their own traditions to the written word of God,' 1675, dedicated to his friend Thomas Barlow, bishop of Lincoln.
- 'The Doctrine of the Glorious Trinity not explained but asserted by several Texts,' 1695.
- 'A modest Plea for the due Regulation of the Press.'

He also printed several sermons, including

- 'Tears and Blood, or a Discourse of the Persecution of Ministers ... set forth in two Sermons,' Oxford, 1660
- 'The Gregorian Account, or Spiritual Watch,' 1673, preached at St. Michael's, Cornhill
- 'The Religious Villain,' 1679, preached before the lord mayor at St. Mary-le-Bow Church, was printed because the preacher was 'rather seen than heard by reason of the inarticulate noise of many through catarrhs and coughs drowning the voice of one.'
- 'A Thanksgiving Sermon for the Deliverance of our King from the late intended Assassination, preached April the 16th 1696.'
