= Richard Busby =

English Anglican priest (1606–1695)

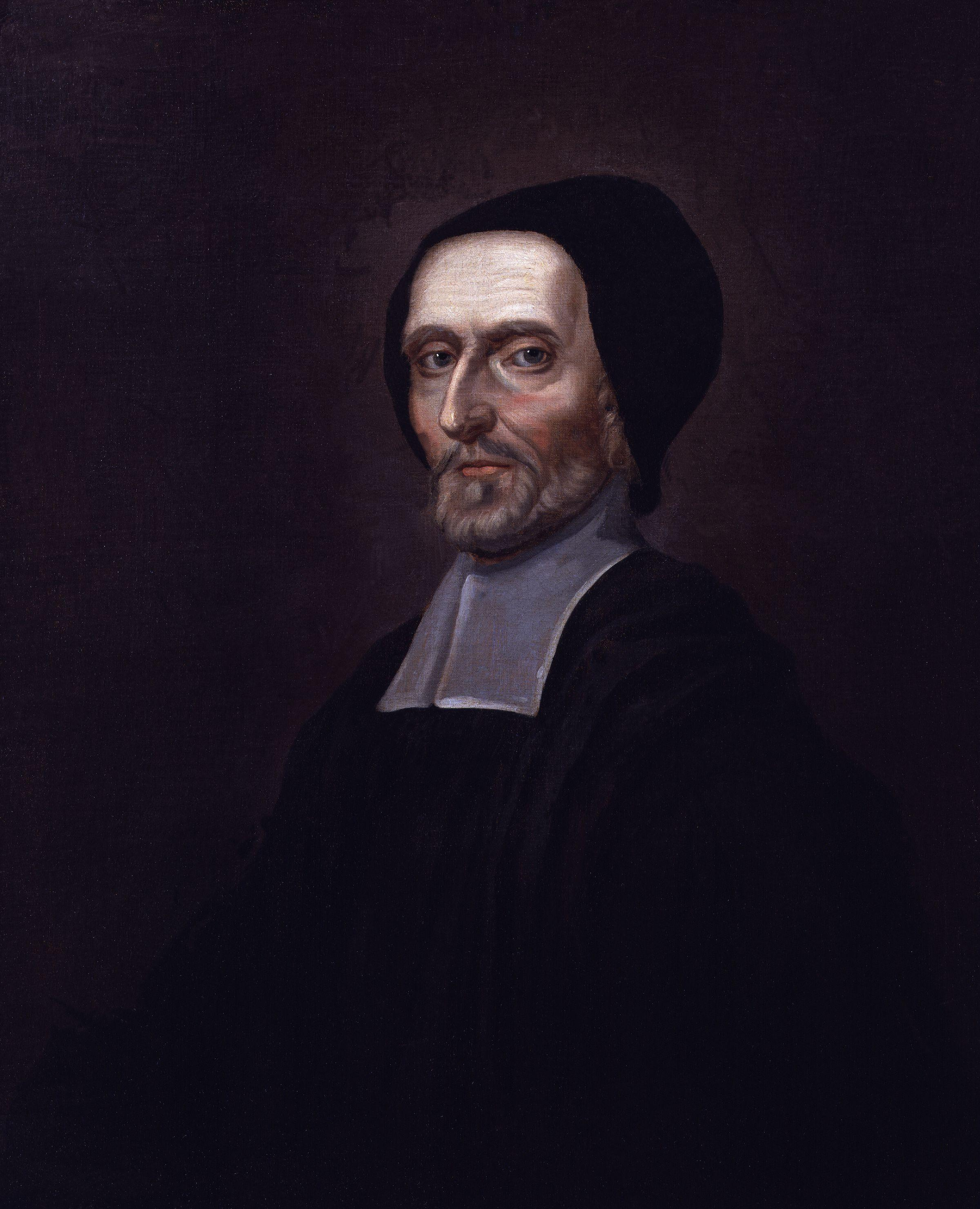
- Born: 22 September 1606; Lutton, Lincolnshire, England
- Died: 6 April 1695 (aged 88); Westminster, England
- Education: Westminster School; Christ Church, Oxford

Ecclesiastical career
- Church: Church of England
- Title: Head Master of Westminster School

Richard Busby (/ˈbʌzbi/; 22 September 1606 – 6 April 1695) was an English Anglican priest who served as head master of Westminster School for more than fifty-five years. Among the more illustrious of his pupils were Christopher Wren, Robert Hooke, Robert South, John Dryden, John Locke, Matthew Prior, Henry Purcell, Thomas Millington and Francis Atterbury.

== Early life and education ==
Busby was born at Lutton in Lincolnshire, and educated at Westminster, where he first showed his academic promise by gaining a King's Scholarship. From Westminster, Busby duly proceeded to Christ Church, Oxford, graduating in 1628. In his thirty-third year he had already become renowned for the obstinate zeal with which he supported the falling dynasty of the Stuarts, and was rewarded for his services with the prebend and rectory of Cudworth, with the chapel of Knowle annexed, in Somerset.

== Career at Westminster ==
In 1638, Busby became headmaster of Westminster, where his reputation as a teacher was soon established. Dr. Busby prayed publicly for King Charles I on the morning of his execution nearby, but remained in office throughout the political changes of the Commonwealth and the Restoration. Despite his unapologetic royalism, a popular anecdote held that one day the school was visited by Charles II and Busby refused to doff his hat to the king, explaining that if the boys saw him doing so, it might lead them to believe there was "a greater man on earth than himself."

As a headmaster, Busby was as famous for liberally administering corporal punishment as he was for his abilities as a teacher and mentor. Though it was said he once boasted of having birched sixteen of the bishops on the bench, many of his students would later speak affectionately of the role he played in their education. The nonconformist Anglican priest Philip Henry attributed his strong religious convictions to Busby's lessons and recalled being flogged as a student only once, and "deservedly", for lying. John Dryden dedicated his translation of the Fifth Satire of Persius to Busby in fond memory of his days at Westminster and sent his two sons to study under Busby as well. In the next century, however, Busby's reputation as a disciplinarian had eclipsed that of his scholarship and pedagogy. Alexander Pope satirised Busby in the 1743 edition of The Dunciad. The ghost of Busby comes forward, carrying a birch rod "dripping with Infants' blood, and Mothers' tears" (The Greater Dunciad IV 142) and proclaims the virtues of rote memorisation for placing a "jingling padlock" on the mind.

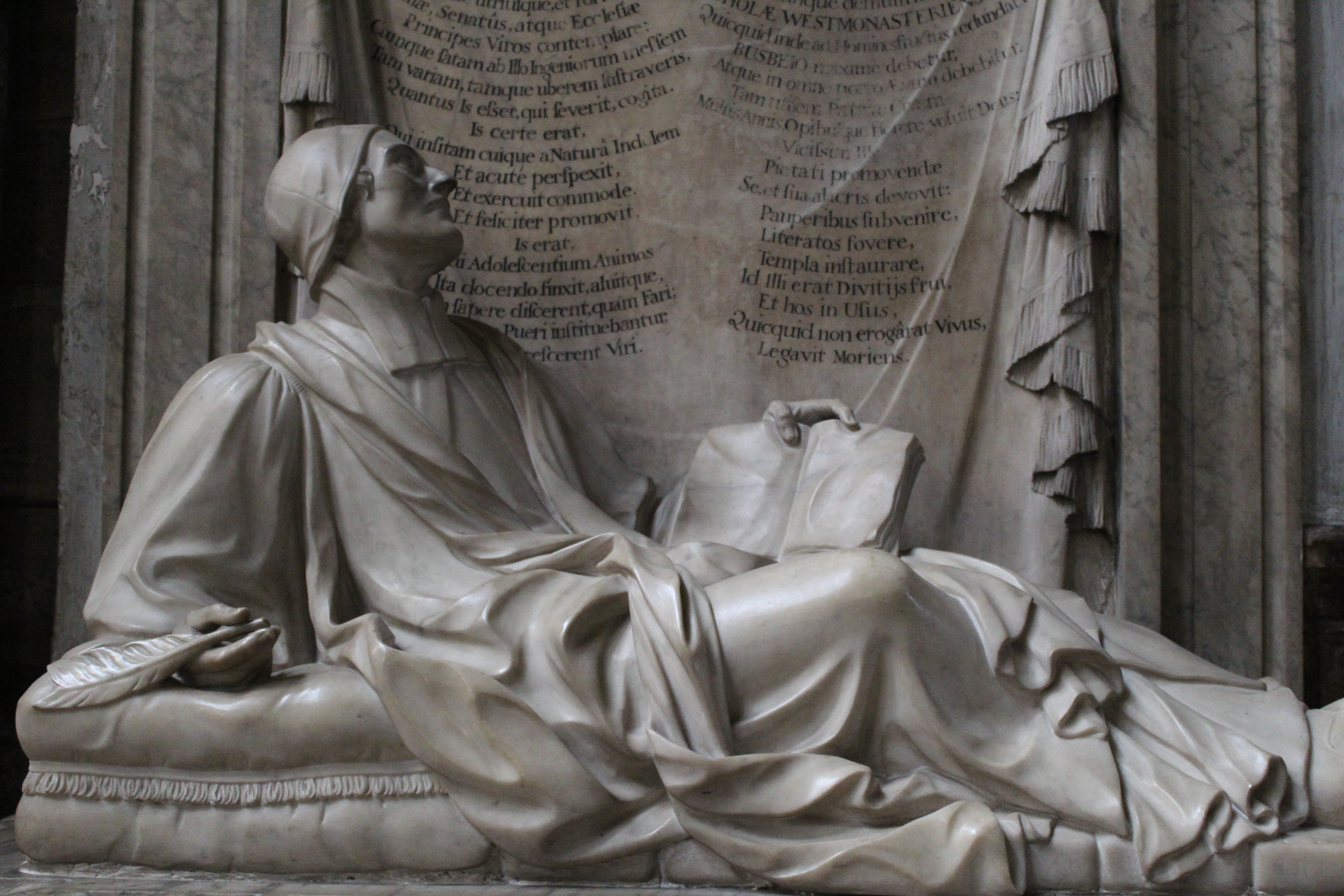
Memorial to Busby in Westminster Abbey

Busby built and stocked a library that is still the classroom of the School's Head of Classics, and he wrote and edited many works for the use of his scholars. His original treatises (the best of which are his Greek and Latin grammars), as well as those he edited, remained in use for centuries. Busby also knew Arabic and Hebrew and wrote grammars in those languages for use in the school, though he does not appear to have published them.

Busby died, still in office, aged 88. Sir Charles Lyttelton relates an old story, that "ye people in ye street, when he was expiring, saw flashes and sparks of fire come out of his window, which made them run into ye house to put it out, but when they were there saw none, nor did they of ye house." He is buried in Westminster Abbey, where his memorial by the sculptor Francis Bird is located in the south transept of the building.

He left his considerable fortune to various charitable causes, and the Busby Trustees still administer his wishes.
