= Joseph Boyse =

Presbyterian minister

Joseph Boyse (14 January 1660 – 22 November 1728) was an English Presbyterian minister in Ireland, and controversialist.

== Early life ==
Boyse was born 14 January 1660 in Leeds, England, one of the sixteen children of Elizabeth and Matthew Boyse, a Puritan, formerly elder of the church at Rowley, New England, and afterwards a resident for about eighteen years at Boston, Massachusetts. He was admitted to Richard Frankland's academy, then at Natland near Kendal, on 16 April 1675; and went on in 1678 to the academy at Stepney under Edward Veal.

Boyse's first ministerial engagement was at Glassenbury, near Cranbrook, Kent, where he preached for nearly a year from the autumn of 1679; after this he served as domestic chaplain, during the latter half of 1681 and spring of 1682, to the Dowager Countess of Donegal (Letitia, daughter of Sir William Hicks) in Lincoln's Inn Fields. For six months in 1682 he ministered to the Brownist church at Amsterdam, in the absence of the regular minister, but he did not swerve from his Presbyterianism. He would have settled in England but for the penal laws against dissent.

== In Ireland ==
On the death of his friend T. Haliday in 1683, he succeeded him at Dublin, and was a minister there for 45 years. His ordination sermon was preached by John Pinney, ejected from Broadwinsor, Dorset. From May 1691 to June 1702 Boyse had Thomas Emlyn as his colleague at Wood Street.

Emlyn's deposition, and subsequent trial, for a blasphemous libel on the ground of an anti-trinitarian publication, did not initially involve Boyse (who had himself been under some suspicion of Pelagianism). In the end Boyse was successful in efforts to free Emlyn from incarceration. Emlyn's place as Boyse's colleague was filled by Richard Choppin, a Dublin man (licensed 1702, ordained 1704, died 1741).

Boyse had been one of the patroni of the academy at Whitehaven (1708–19), under Thomas Dixon, M.D., and when it close he was involved with the settlement in Dublin of Francis Hutcheson as head (till 1729) of a similar institution, in which Boyse taught divinity. He also became caught up in the nonsubscription controversy. At the synod in Belfast, 1721, he was present as a commissioner from Dublin; protested with his colleague, in the name of the Dublin presbytery, against the vote allowing a voluntary subscription to the Westminster Confession; and succeeded in carrying a ‘charitable declaration,’ freeing nonsubscribers from censure and recommending mutual forbearance. Next year, being absent through illness, he printed a sermon; at this synod (1723) a letter was received from him announcing a proposed change in the management of the regium donum, viz. that it would be distributed by a body of trustees in London, with the intended of checking the high-handed party in the synod. The rupture between the southern and northern Presbyterians was completed by the installation of a nonsubscriber, Alexander Colville, M.D., on 25 October 1725 at Dromore, County Down, by the Dublin presbytery; Boyse was not one of the installers.

He died in straitened circumstances on 22 November 1728, leaving a son, Samuel Boyse (the biographers of this son have not usually mentioned that he was one of the deputation to present the address from the general synod of Ulster on the accession of George I), and a daughter, married to Mr. Waddington. He was succeeded in his ministry at Wood Street by John Abernethy in 1730.

== Works ==
Boyse came forward as a controversialist on behalf of Presbyterian dissent. First of his works is the Vindiciæ Calvinisticæ, 1688, an able epistle (with the pseudo-signature W.B., D.D.), in reply to William King, then chancellor of St Patrick's Cathedral, who had attacked the Presbyterians in his ‘Answer’ to the ‘Considerations’ of Peter Manby, ex-dean of Derry, who had turned Catholic. Again, when Governor Walker of Derry described Alexander Osborne (a Presbyterian minister, originally from co. Tyrone, who had been called to Newmarket, Dublin, 6 December 1687) as ‘a spy of Tyrconnel,’ Boyse put forth a ‘Vindication,’ 1690, He was a second time in the field against King, now bishop of Derry (who had fulminated against Presbyterian forms of worship), in 'Remarks' 1694, and 'Vindication of the Remarks', 1695. Early in the latter year he had printed anonymously a folio tract, ‘The Case of the Protestant Dissenters in Ireland in reference to a Bill of Indulgence,’ &c., to which Tobias Pullen, bishop of Dromore, wrote an anonymous answer, and Anthony Dopping, bishop of Meath, another reply, also anonymous. Both prelates were against a legal toleration for Irish dissent. Boyse retorted on them in 'The Case … Vindicated', 1695.

In Emlyn's case, Boyse drew up "The Difference between Mr. E. and the Dissenting Ministers of D. truly represented", and published A Vindication of the True Deity of our Blessed Saviour, 1703 (2nd ed. 1710), in answer to Emlyn's 'Humble Inquiry'. Boyse takes note that ‘the unitarians are coming over to the deists in point of doctrine.’

In 1708, Boyse issued a volume of fifteen sermons, of which the last was an ordination discourse on ‘The Office of a Scriptural Bishop,’ with a polemical appendix. This received answers from Edward Drury and Matthew French, curates in Dublin, and the discourse itself was, without Boyse's consent, reprinted separately in 1709. He had, however, the opportunity of adding a postscript, in which he replied to the above answers, and he continued the controversy in 'A Clear Account of the Ancient Episcopacy', 1712.

Meantime, the reprint of his sermon, with postscript, was burned by the common hangman, by order of the Irish House of Lords, in November 1711. This was King's last argument against Boyse; now the archbishop of Dublin writes to Jonathan Swift, "we burned Mr. Boyse's book of a scriptural bishop". Once more Boyse came forward in defence of dissent, in 'Remarks', 1716, on a pamphlet by William Tisdall, D.D., vicar of Belfast, respecting the sacramental test.

The preface to Abernethy's ‘Seasonable Advice,’ 1722, and the postscript to his ‘Defence’ of the same, 1724, are included among Boyse's collected works, though signed also by his Dublin brethren, Nathaniel Weld and Choppin. In the same year he preached (24 June) at Derry during the sitting of the general synod of Ulster. His text was John viii. 34, 35, and the publication of the discourse, which strongly deprecated disunion threatened by the different northern and southern Presbyterian traditions, was urged by those on both sides.

He published in 1726 a lengthy letter to the Presbyterian ministers of the north, in ‘vindication’ of a private communication on their disputes, which had been printed without his knowledge. Writing to the Rev. Thomas Steward of Bury St Edmunds on 1 November 1726, Boyse speaks of the exclusion of the nonsubscribers as ‘the late shameful rupture,’ and gives an account of the new presbytery which the general synod, in pursuance of its separative policy, had erected for Dublin. Controversies crowded thickly on Boyse, but he wrote calmly. He published several sermons against Romanists, and a letter (with appendix) ‘Concerning the Pretended Infallibility of the Romish Church,’ addressed to a Protestant divine who had written against Rome. His 'Some Queries offered to the Consideration of the People called Quakers, &c.', called forth, shortly before Boyse's death, a reply by Samuel Fuller, a Dublin schoolmaster.

Boyse's works were collected by himself in two huge folios, London, 1728 (usually bound in one; they are the earliest folios published by a Presbyterian minister of Ireland). Prefixed is a recommendation (dated 23 April 1728) signed by Edmund Calamy and five other London ministers. The first volume contains seventy-one sermons (several being funeral, ordination, and anniversary discourses; many had already been collected in two volumes, 1708–10), and several tracts on justification. Embedded among the sermons (at p. 326) is a piece of autobiography, 'Some Remarkable Passages in the Life and Death of Mr. Edmund Trench'. The second volume is wholly controversial. Not included in these volumes are:

- ‘Vindication of Osborne’ (see above).
- ‘Sacramental Hymns collected (chiefly) out of such Passages of the New Testament as contain the most suitable matter of Divine Praises in the Celebration of the Lord's Supper, &c.,’ Dublin, 1693, with another title-page, London, 1693.
- ‘Case of the Protestant Dissenters’ (see above).
- ‘Family Hymns for Morning and Evening Worship. With some for the Lord's Days. … All taken out of the Psalms of David,’ Dublin, 1701.
- ‘The Difference between Mr. E. and the Dissenting Ministers of D., &c.’ (See above. Emlyn reprints it in the appendix to his ‘Narrative,’ 1719, and says Boyse drew it up).

Of his separate publications an incomplete list is furnished by Thomas Witherow. The bibliography of the earlier ones is also given in Reid. Boyse wrote the Latin inscription on the original pedestal (1701) of the equestrian statue of William III in College Green, Dublin.

== Family ==
Boyse married Rachel Ibbetson in 1699; after her death, he married Mary Pape.

Presbyterian Church titles
Preceded by Daniel Williams; Gilbert Rule	Minister of Wood Street Presbyterian Church, Dublin; 1683–1728; With: Daniel Williams,1683-1687; Gilbert Rule,1683-1687; Thomas Emlyn, 1691-1702; Richard Choppin, 1704-1728	Succeeded by Richard Choppin
