= Thomas Firmin =

English businessman, philanthropist and publisher

Thomas Firmin (June 1632 – 1697) was an English businessman and philanthropist, publisher and unitarian member of the Church of England.

== Early life ==
Firmin was born to Puritan parents, Henry and Prudence Firmin in Ipswich. Henry Firmin was a parishioner of Samuel Ward, the Puritan incumbent of St. Mary-le-Tower, by whom in 1635 he was accused of erroneous tenets. Thomas Firmin as a young man sent to London and apprenticed to a girdler and mercer who attended the services of John Goodwin at St Stephen Coleman Street; he took down Goodwin's sermons in shorthand.

Setting up in business on his own, in Lombard Street, he met generally latitudinarian Anglicans (Whichcote, John Worthington, John Wilkins, Edward Fowler, and Edward Tillotson). He also became acquainted with John Biddle, who would become an important practical influence. He married in 1660.

== Philanthropy and the linen workhouse ==
Firmin's first philanthropic experiment was occasioned by the trade disorganisation in 1665, the year of the Great Plague. He provided employment at making up clothing for hands thrown out of work. During the Great Fire of London (1666) his Lombard Street premises were burned. He secured temporary accommodation in Leadenhall Street, and in a few years was able to rebuild in Lombard Street, and to carry on his business with increased success. In 1676 he left the management of the concern in the hands of his nephew and partner, Jonathan James (son of his sister Prudence), who had been his apprentice; he was then worth about £9,000. Since about 1673 he had been a governor of Christ's Hospital.

Early in 1676 he started a workhouse in Little Britain, for "the employment of the poor in the linen manufacture"; he built new premises expressly for it. Tillotson suggests that Firmin was influenced by the example of Thomas Gouge. Firmin employed as many as seventeen hundred spinners, besides flax-dressers, weavers, at the market rate (a sixteen-hour day for 6d.), but with some bonuses in kind. He made arrangements for the comfort and cleanliness of his hands, and for the training of children from the streets. He printed large editions of a Scripture Catechism (probably by Edward Fowler), and gave rewards to those who learned it.

The scheme never paid its way, and he had to carry the losses. In 1690 the patentees of the linen manufacture took it over, retaining Firmin as its manager on a salary, and reducing the wages. The new arrangement was still unsuccessful, Firmin was not paid, and the enterprise was returned to him. He kept it up to the day of his death, and nominally contrived to make it pay, by keeping the wages low, and supplementing them by private doles to his workers. The higher rate of wages in woollen manufacture led Firmin to attempt its introduction as a London industry, in Artillery Lane. After losing money on the pilot scheme for over two years he abandoned it. He was also involved in collecting for Huguenot refugees, and started a linen manufacture for them in Ipswich in 1682.

From about 1676 he interested himself in the condition of prisoners for debt, freeing several hundreds who were detained for small sums, and successfully promoting acts of grace for the liberation of others. He visited prisons, inquired into the treatment pursued, and prosecuted harsh and extortionate gaolers.

In conjunction with his friend, Sir Robert Clayton, Firmin was an active governor of Christ's Hospital, carrying out improvements, of structure and arrangement. On Sunday evenings it was his custom to attend the scholars' service, and see that their "pudding-pies" for supper were of proper "bigness". In April 1693 he was elected a governor of St. Thomas's Hospital, of which Clayton had been made president in the previous year. Firmin carried through the work of rebuilding the hospital and church. He kept a register of the poor he visited, recommending their cases, and apprenticing their children. From Biddle that he learned to make it his business to look into the condition of the poor by personal investigation, and to reduce the causes of social distress.

== Religious and political views ==
In 1662 he raised money partly by "collections in churches" for the exiled anti-trinitarians of Poland; but when the Polish Calvinists met the same fate Firmin joined efforts for their relief. His acquaintance with religious controversies was gained in conversation, with most leading churchmen. He also shared Biddle's views in the matter of religious toleration, and his views on Catholicism turned on religious persecution.

In politics Firmin does not seem to have taken any part till 1685. His opposition to James II cost him for a time his governorship at Christ's Hospital. Not won by James's declaration for liberty of conscience, he aided the circulation of pamphlets which sounded the alarm against it. His principles seem to have been republican, but he was a devoted adherent to William of Orange. To Robert Frampton, the nonjuring bishop of Gloucester, Firmin remarked, "I hope you will not be a nonconformist in your old age". Frampton retorted that Firmin himself was "a nonconformist to all Christendom besides a few lowsy sectarys in Poland". On the Protestant exodus from Ireland in 1688–9 Firmin was the principal commissioner for the relief of the refugees; more than £56,000 went through his hands, and eight of the Protestant hierarchy of Ireland addressed to him a joint letter of thanks. He was rendering a similar service for the nonjurors in 1695, when he was stopped by the interference of the government. Firmin was an original member of the Society for the Reformation of Manners (1691), and was very active in the enforcement of fines for the repression of profane swearing.

Luke Milbourn in 1692 speaks of Firmin as a "hawker" for the Socinians, "to disperse their new-fangled divinity". Books of this class known with certainty to have been promoted by him include the following:

- In 1687 there was printed at his expense A Brief History of the Unitarians, called also Socinians. It is in the shape of four letters, written for his information, probably by Stephen Nye, and is noteworthy as marking the first appearance in English literature of the term "unitarian", a name unknown to Biddle.
- In 1689 he printed Brief Notes on the Creed of St. Athanasius, a sheet by an unknown author.
- John Tillotson, Archbishop of Canterbury and a friend of Firmin, who had lectured on the Socinian controversy at St. Lawrence, Jewry, in 1679–80, felt himself compelled by "calumnies" to publish the lectures in 1693. He sent a copy to Firmin, who printed a letter (29 September 1694) in reply, probably by Nye, under the title Considerations on the Explications of the Doctrine of the Trinity (sometimes confounded with a tract of 1693 with similar title, and by the same hand). This he laid before Tillotson, who remarked that Gilbert Burnet's forthcoming exposition of the articles "shall humble your writers".
- In 1697, at Firmin's instance, appeared The Agreement of the Unitarians with the Catholick Church, a work which more closely expresses his own views than any of the foregoing.

He never departed from the communion of the church of England, but put a Sabellian sense on the public forms. At the time of his death he was meditating a plan of "unitarian congregations" to meet for devotional purposes as fraternities within the church.

== Last days ==
Firmin became consumptive, and was carried off in a couple of days by a typhoid fever, dying on 20 December 1697. Bishop Fowler attended him on his deathbed. He was buried in the cloisters at Christ's Hospital, where a marble slab was placed in his memory. A memorial pillar stands in the grounds of Marden Park, Surrey. He died worth about £3,000.

== Publications ==
- Some Proposals for the Imploying of the Poor, especially in and about London, and for the Prevention of Begging. In a Letter to a Friend. By T. F., 1678. An enlarged issue appeared in 1681; two editions same year. It was reprinted in a collection of Tracts relating to the Poor, 1787.
- The Faith of One God (1691) – a collection of tracts about the Trinity published by Firmin as part of the "Socinian controversy" among Anglicans from about 1687–98. The first part is largely writings by John Biddle (1615–62), the first prominent English unitarian. The second contains seven anonymous works, some by Stephen Nye (1648–1719).

== Family ==
He was twice married: first, in 1660, to a citizen's daughter with a portion of £500; she died while Firmin was at Cambridge on business, leaving a son (d. about 1690) and a daughter (d. in infancy); secondly, in 1664, to Margaret (d. 14 January 1719, aged 77), daughter of Giles Dentt, J.P., of Newport, Essex, alderman of London; by her he had several children, who all died in infancy, except the eldest, Giles, born 22 May 1665 (Tillotson was his godfather). Giles received his mother's portion and became a merchant; he married Rachel (d. 11 April 1724), daughter of Perient Trott and sister of Lady Clayton; died at Oporto on 22 January 1694, and was buried at Newport on 13 April; his widow afterwards married Owen Griffith, rector of Blechingley, Surrey.
