= Archibald Turner (minister) =

Archibald Turner (1629–1681) was a 17th-century Scottish minister who served as minister of St Giles Cathedral and as Sub-Dean of the Chapel Royal

== Life ==
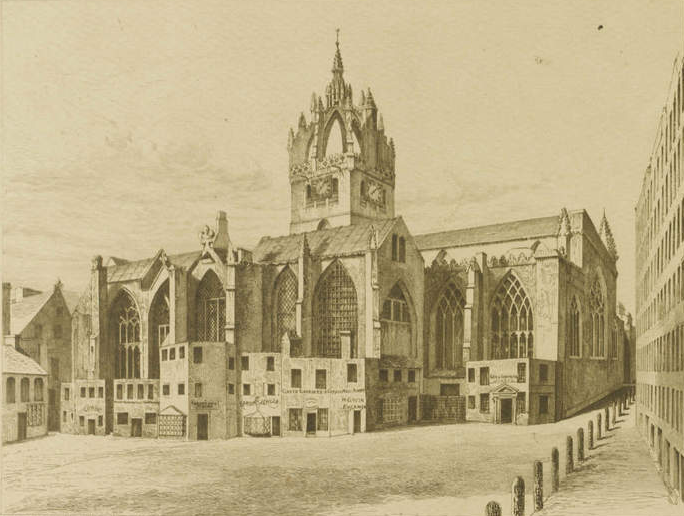
St Giles in the 18th century

He was born in 1629 in Dalkeith manse the son of Rev Patrick Turner. He gained an MA from Edinburgh University in July 1642 aged only 13.

He was ordained as a minister of the Church of Scotland at Borthwick Parish Church, south of Edinburgh in March 1648. He translated to North Berwick in December 1649. Edinburgh town council elected him to the High Church and in November 1662 he became minister of one of the four parishes of Edinburgh: the Old Kirk of St Giles. In June 1663 he was appointed Sub-Dean of the Chapel Royal. In 1674 the Privy Council removed him from office and sent him to Glasgow but, having expressed regret, he was reinstated in 1675.

He died on 30 March 1681.

== Family ==
In 1666 he married Rebecca Couper (1628-1675) daughter of Alexander Couper of Failford WS. She died in 1675 and was buried in Greyfriars Kirkyard.
