= William Sherlock (theologian) =

English church leader (c. 1639–1707)

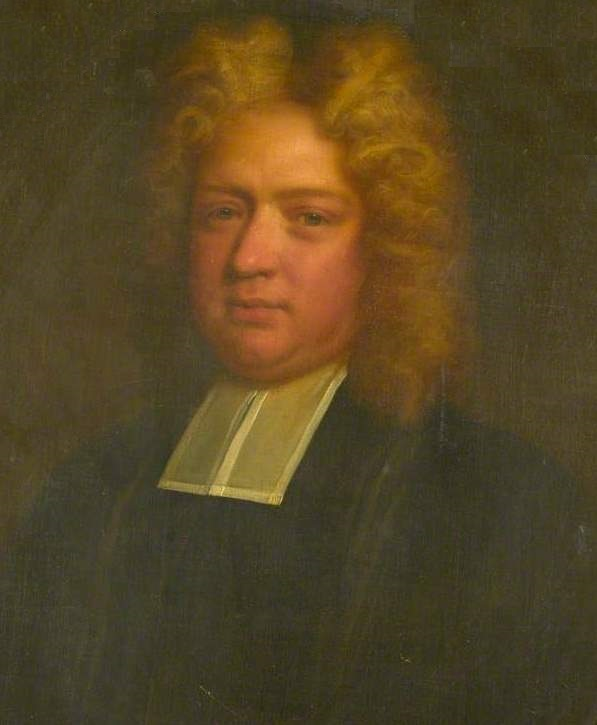
William Sherlock

William Sherlock (c. 1639/1641 – June 19, 1707) was an English church leader.

== Life ==
Sherlock was born at Southwark, son of a tradesman, and was educated at St Saviour's Grammar School and Eton, and then at Peterhouse, Cambridge. In 1669 he became rector of St George's, Botolph Lane, in the City of London, and in 1681 was appointed a prebendary of St Paul’s. In 1684 he was made Master of the Temple.

In 1686, Sherlock was among a swift succession of clergymen reproved by King James II & VII for preaching against the Pope and the following of him; and also for his controversy with the new king’s chaplain, Lewis Sabran; his pension was stopped. After the Glorious Revolution, which deposed the king, he was suspended for refusing the oaths to William III and Mary II but yielded before losing his position.

He became Dean of St Paul's in 1691. About this time, Sherlock became involved in the Socinian controversy over Unitarian ideas. In 1690 and 1693, he published works on the doctrine of the Trinity, which ironically helped rather than injured the Socinian cause and involved him in a controversy with Robert South and others. His doctrine was even condemned as heretical at Oxford University. Sherlock defended himself in The Distinction... and Present State... (both 1696), which however practically gave up on the positions that had been impugned.

He died at Hampstead in 1707. By his wife, Elizabeth Gardner, he was the father of Bishop Thomas Sherlock.

== Works ==
- The Knowledge of Jesus Christ and Union with Him (1674), which showed his tendencies toward controversy by an attack on Puritan theologian John Owen.
- A Practical Discourse of Religious Assemblies (1681)
- The Case of Resistance of the Supreme Powers Stated and Resolved According to the Doctrine of the Holy Scriptures (1684), which drew the distinction between active and passive obedience, and was generally accepted by the High Church clergy.
- The Protestant Resolution of Faith (pamphlet) (1687)
- A Preservative Against Popery: Being Some Plain Directions to Unlearned Protestants, How to Dispute With Romish Priests. (1688)
- A Practical Discourse Concerning Death (1689), written during the period of his suspension, which became very popular.
- A Vindication of the Doctrine of the Holy and Ever Blessed Trinity (1690), in response to Socinianism.
- The Case of the Allegiance Due to Sovereign Powers Stated and Resolved According to Scripture and Reason and the Principles of the Church of England (1691), justifying his change of attitude toward William and Mary.
- A Discourse Concerning the Divine Providence (1694)
- The Distinction Between Real and Nominal Trinitarians Examined, and the Doctrine of a Real Trinity Vindicated From the Charge of Tritheism (1696)
- A modest examination of the authority and reasons of the late decree of the vice-chancellor of Oxford, and some heads of colleges and halls: concerning the heresy of three distinct infinite minds in the Holy and Ever-blessed Trinity (1696)
- Present State of the Socinian Controversy (1696/1698)
- A Discourse Concerning the Happiness of Good Men, and the Punishment of the Wicked, in the Next World, &C.
- A Practical Discourse Concerning a Future Judgment.

His sermons, collected in two volumes, went through several editions.
