= Preservative Against Popery =

Preservative against Popery (also Preservation against Popery) is a name commonly given to a collection of anti-Catholic works published in 1738 by Edmund Gibson. It drew largely on the literature of the "Romish Controversy" of the 1680s, in which Church of England controversialists made a case against what they saw as a present threat from Catholicism. The original edition was in three folio volumes.

== 19th-century edition (1848–49) ==
John Cumming made an edition in the 1840s. In 18 volumes, it collected up extra tracts. The publication was supported by the British Reformation Society, part of the reaction to Tractarianism.

| Volume | Contents |
|---|---|
| I | Nicholas Stratford, William Clagett, Gilbert Burnet, William Cave or Thorp, Roger Altham |
| II | George Hickes, Gregory Hascard, Burnet, Henry Wharton, William Payne |
| III | William Lloyd, Simon Patrick, Nathaniel Resbury, Samuel Freeman, William Sherlock, "Popish Notes" (against Robert Bellarmine: Sherlock, Freeman, Simon Patrick, John Williams, Edward Fowler, Thorp, Payne, Claggett, John Scott, Thomas Lynford) |
| IV | Thomas Tenison, Resbury, Clagett, Richard Kidder, Stratford, Robert Grove, Clement Ellis or Anthony Ellys, Luke de Beaulieu, Henry Maurice, Sherlock |
| V | Simon Patrick, George Tully or Thomas Tully, Hutchinson and Clagett, Edward Stillingfleet, Williams, Sherlock, Kidder, Stratford |
| VI | Grove, Fowler, Sherlock, William Wake, Payne, Edward Gee and Kidder, Williams |
| VII | Scott, Freeman, Clagett, Daniel Whitby, Thomas Comber |
| VIII | Comber, Gee, William Stanley, Stillingfleet, Peter Allix, Clagett, Payne |
| IX | Payne, Clagett, John Patrick, Stillingfleet, Williams |
| X | Wake, Payne, John Goodman, Lynford, Allix, John Gascarth, Stillingfleet |
| XI | Wake, John Bramston, Sherlock, Stillingfleet |
| XII | Lloyd, Wake |
| XIII | Wake, Williams, Stillingfleet, Clagett |
| XIV | Clagett, Sherlock, Altham, Samuel Gardiner |
| XV | Robert Jenkin, Comber, William Fleetwood |
| XVI | Simon Patrick, Hicks?, Tenison, Clagett |
| XVII | Lord Burleigh, John Rawlett, Joseph Hall |
| XVIII | Biographical |

== Supplement (1849–50) ==
Cumming, Richard Paul Blakeney and Martin Wilson Foye then edited a Supplement to the edition of Cumming, again for the British Reformation Society. It was in eight volumes.

1. Isaac Barrow, The Pope's Supremacy
2. Simon Birckbek, The Protestant's Evidence (2 vols.)
3. Humphrey Lynde, Via Tuta and Via Devia
4. Lynde, A Case for the Spectacles, and Daniel Featley, Stricturæ in Lyndomastigem
5. John Edwards, The Doctrines Controverted between Papists and Protestants
6. Foye, Rites, Offices and Legends
7. James Serces, Popery Enemy to Scripture (1736; a reply to Robert Witham, Annotations on the New Testament of Jesus Christ, 1730), Pierre Mussard, The Religious Rites of Ancient and Modern Rome, Barrow, A Discourse Concerning the Unity of the Church

== Related titles ==
- William Sherlock (1688), A Preservative Against Popery
- Edward Aspinwall (1715) A Preservation Against Popery
- John Hildrop (1735), A Caveat against Popery; being a seasonable Preservative against Romish Delusions and Jacobitism now industriously spread throughout the Nation
- Joseph Blanco White (1825), The Poor Man's Preservative Against Popery
