= Humphrey Lynde =

English lay Puritan controversialist and politician

Sir Humphrey Lynde (1579–1636) was an English lay Puritan controversialist and politician who sat in the House of Commons in 1626.

== Life ==
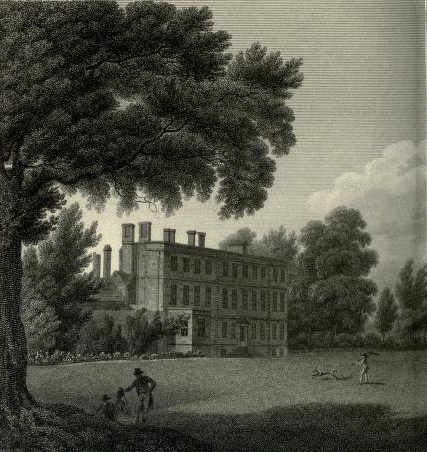
Twickenham Meadows, engraving by John Landseer after John Webber (detail)

Lynde was the son of Cuthbert Linde or Lynde of Westminster. He was elected a queen's scholar at Westminster School; matriculated 14 January 1597 at Christ Church, Oxford, and graduated B.A. 7 July 1600. In 1601 he became a student at the Middle Temple, and succeeded to a family estate near Cobham, Surrey. In 1611, he acquired an estate at Clapham, but in April 1614, he was licensed to alienate 800 acres of his estate to John Hawsley. He moved to a mansion he built on the Thames at Twickenham Meadows, Middlesex, where several of his children were baptized. He was knighted by James I (29 October 1613), made a justice of the peace, and represented Brecknock in parliament February–June 1626 after Sir Walter Pye chose to stand for Herefordshire.

Lynde was a noted anti-Catholic. On 27 June 1623 a prominent debate on the claims of Rome was held at his London house. Daniel Featley and Francis White represented the Protestants, and the Jesuits John Percy alias Fisher (1569–1641) and John Sweet argued on behalf of the Catholic views. A report of the debate, The Romish Fisher Caught, 1624, was published by Featley, at the command of Archbishop George Abbot.

He was well known to Simon Birckbek, and James Duport notices him in his Musæ Subsecivæ. Lynde died 8 June 1636, and was buried in Cobham parish church, 14 June. The funeral sermon, preached by his friend Daniel Featley (published 1638), contains a eulogy on his life and character.

== Works ==
In 1623 Lynde published An Account of Bertram the Priest, with Observations concerning the Censures upon his Tract, "De Corpore et Sanguine Christi". This was intended as an introduction to a tract against transubstantiation by Ratramnus, of which English translations had appeared in 1548 and 1582, and another, by William Guild, came out in 1624. Lynde dedicated his work to Sir Walter Pye, and a copy was sent to James Ussher by Archbishop Abbot's chaplains Thomas Good and Daniel Featley). Dr. Matthew Brian reprinted Lynde's 'Account' in 1686.

Shortly after its first publication a Jesuit challenged Lynde to prove the visibility through all ages of the Protestant church. Antient Characters of the Visible Church, 1625, was his first attempt to meet the challenge, but in 1628 he pursued his argument in Via Tuta, the Safe Way … to the True, Ancient, and Catholique Faith now professed in the Church of England. John Heigham replied at length in Via Vere Tuta (1631), and John Floyd, writing under the initials 'J. R.,’ followed Heigham's attack with A Paire of Spectacles for Sir Humphrey Linde to see his Way withal, 1631. In 1632 a third reply, The Whetstone of Reproof, by T. T., Sacristan and Catholike Romanist, appeared at Douai.

In response to Floyd’s publication, Lynde wrote A Case for the Spectacles. William Laud refused to license this response (on the ground, according to William Prynne's Canterburies Doome, that Lynde was a layman); the work was not published in Lynde's lifetime.

Lynde pursued his attacks on the Catholics in Via Devia, the Byway leading the Weak into unstable and dangerous Paths of Popish Error, London, 1630. Lynde also supported a collection made by Thomas James of passages from Protestant writers 'pruned away by the Romish knife.'

After Lynde's death his friend Featley printed Lynde's A Case for a Pair of Spectacles, the reply to Floyd, together with a defence of Lynde by Featley, entitled Stricture in Lyndomastigem by Way of Supplement to the Knight's Answer and Featley's Funeral Sermon. This work was reprinted, with the Via Tuta and Via Devia, in Blakeney's edition of Edmund Gibson's Preservative against Popery, vols. iv. and v., 1849. Via Tuta was also reissued in 1848, and a French translation of it and of Via Devia is dated 1645.

== Family ==
He left three sons and six daughters. A grandson, son of his heir Alexander Lynde, is said to have been a curate of Maidstone and Vicar of Boxley.

== Notes ==
Parliament of England
| Preceded by Sir Walter Pye | Member of Parliament for Brecon; 1626 | Succeeded by Walter Pye (Royalist) |
