= John Rawlet =

English Anglican cleric

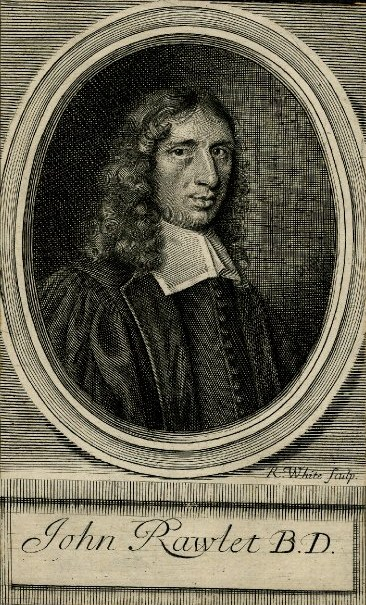
- Posthumous portrait c. 1687
- Born: John Rawlet or Rawlett; 27 March 1642; Tamworth, Staffordshire, England
- Died: 28 September 1686 (aged 44); Tamworth, Staffordshire, England

John Rawlet or Rawlett (27 March 1642 – 28 September 1686) was an English Anglican cleric, known as a preacher and writer of religious literature, and for his close sympathy with Presbyterians.

== Life ==
Baptised at Tamworth in Warwickshire on 27 March 1642, Rawlet was religiously inclined from a young age. He matriculated at Pembroke Hall, Cambridge on 15 December 1659. Prevented by poverty from proceeding to an ordinary degree, he later obtained the degree of Bachelor of Divinity on 23 June 1676, with a royal mandate of Charles II.

After taking holy orders and engaging in clerical work in London, Rawlet was settled in the north before 1761, acting for a short while as chaplain to John Wilkins, the bishop of Chester from 1668. In 1670, Rawlet let Richard Baxter know that Wilkins had succeeded with John Tilsley, an ejected minister of local prominence, in efforts to have him conform to the Church of England. At this period, Rawlet mentioned to Baxter rumours of preferments that he could have himself as an Anglican.

In 1679, Rawlet described himself as minister of Kirkby Stephen in Westmorland. In the summer of the same year (25 June 1679), he succeeded the Rev. John Marsh in the lectureship at St. Nicholas Church, Newcastle-on-Tyne the parish church). He stayed in Newcastle in 1682 when he was offered the vicarage of Coleshill in Warwickshire, but recommended John Kettlewell for the vacancy; and remained in Newcastle, now with an added post at St Ann's as lecturer, or preacher, a post in the gift of the city's Common Council. The vicar was John March.

Rawlet died on 28 September 1686, aged 44. By his will, he left most of his property and his library to his native town of Tamworth. The Rawlett School in Tamworth is named after him. Henry Bourne called Rawlet "a very pious and charitable man".

For a fuller biography and references to original sources, see John Rawlet, Poet & Preacher by Margaret Manuell which can be viewed on line at http://freepages.misc.rootsweb.ancestry.com/~enzedders/rawlet.htm

== Works ==
Rawlet's major works are:

- A Dialogue betwixt two Protestants (in Answer to a Popish Catechism called "A Short Catechism against all Sectaries"), 1685, 1686 ("3rd edition"), and in Edmund Gibson's Preservative against Popery (1738, vol. iii. and ed. John Cumming, 1848, vol. xvii.).
- The Christian Monitor, containing an Earnest Exhortation to a Holy Dying, with proper Directions in Order thereto, written in a very plain and easy style for all sorts of people, London, 1686. A very popular work, it reached its twenty-fifth edition in 1699, and was constantly reissued during the eighteenth century. In 1689 a Welsh version, translated by Edward Morris, bore the title Y Rhybuddiwr Christnogawl; it also was reissued.
- Poetick Miscellanies, London, 1687, 1691, 1721.
- A Treatise of Sacramental Covenanting with Christ, London, 1682; 5th edit. 1692, 1736. An extract, edited by Henry Venn and called Earnest Persuasions to receive the Lord Jesus Christ, and become Subject to Him, appeared in London in 1758.

== Notes ==
Attribution

This article incorporates text from a publication now in the public domain: Lee, Sidney, ed. (1896). "Rawlet, John". Dictionary of National Biography. Vol. 47. London: Smith, Elder & Co.
