= Nathaniel Resbury =

English cleric and author

Nathaniel Resbury (1643–1711) was an English cleric and author.

== Life ==
He was baptised on 24 September 1643 at Oundle, Northamptonshire, where his father, Richard Resbury, was a nonconformist minister. He entered Emmanuel College, Cambridge, on 8 July 1657, graduated B.A. in 1661, M.A. in 1672. He was incorporated at Oxford on 15 July 1673, and proceeded B.D. and D.D. from Merton College on 11 July 1692.

Resbury was appointed vicar of Wandsworth, Surrey, in 1674, and became chaplain to Arthur Annesley, 1st Earl of Anglesey, and to his son James. He was rector of Broughton Gifford in Wiltshire, from 1687, and of St Paul's, Shadwell, Middlesex, from 1689, and was appointed chaplain in ordinary to William III and Mary II in 1691. He frequently preached at Whitehall Chapel, and at St Paul's Cathedral and the London Charterhouse.

An anecdote of Resbury was that once, while preaching in the chapel royal from the text "I am fearfully and wonderfully made", he unconsciously blackened all his face with the dye from a new black glove. He died on 31 July 1711, and was buried in St Giles's Church, Reading.

== Works ==
Resbury was an orthodox Church of England priest, and a popular preacher. As well as some separate sermons he published:

- The Case of the Cross in Baptism considered, published in A Collection of Cases, London, 1684; 2nd edition 1694, 3rd edition 1718.
- The Eleventh Note of the Church, viz. The Glory of Miracles in the Notes of the Church as laid down by Cardinal Bellarmine, examined and confuted, London, 1688; reprinted in vol. iv. of John Cumming's edition of A Preservative against Popery, London, 1848.
- ‘The Texts examined which Papists cite out of the Bible for Proof of their Doctrine concerning the Visibility of the Church,’ London, 1688, in Popery not founded upon Scripture, 1668–9; reprinted by Edmund Gibson in his Preservative against Popery, London, 1738.

== Family ==
Resbury married, in 1691, a widow, Mrs. Mary Cordell of St. Matthew's parish, Friday Street, London, who was a daughter of Robert Cuthbert, a wealthy London goldsmith. His wife predeceased him without issue.

== Notes ==
Attribution

This article incorporates text from a publication now in the public domain: Lee, Sidney, ed. (1896). "Resbury, Nathaniel". Dictionary of National Biography. Vol. 48. London: Smith, Elder & Co.
