= Humphrey Gower =

English clergyman and academic

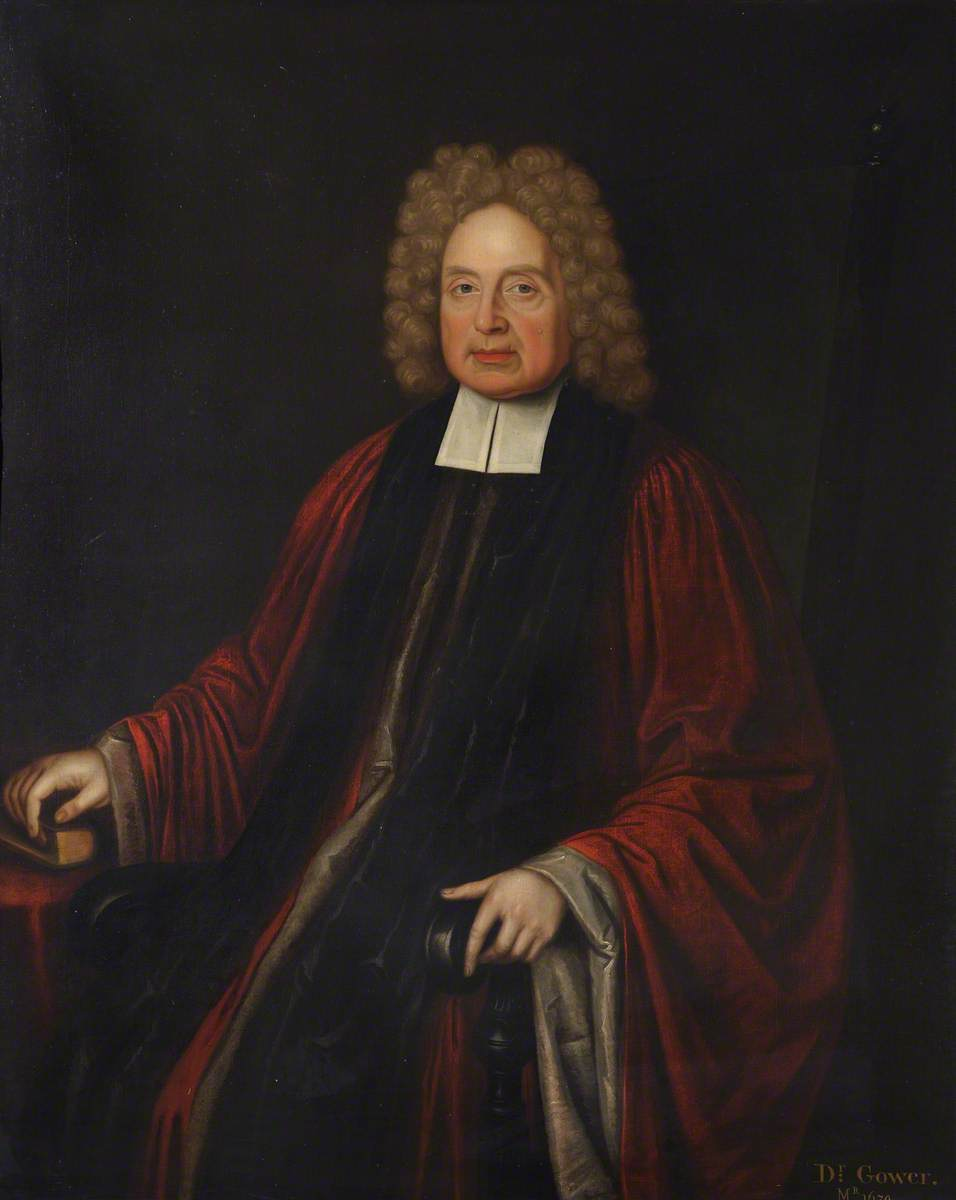
Humphrey Gower

Humphrey Gower (1638–1711) was an English clergyman and academic, Master of Jesus College, Cambridge, and then St. John's College, Cambridge, and Lady Margaret's Professor of Divinity.

== Life ==
He was the son of Stanley Gower, successively rector of Brampton Bryan, Herefordshire, and of Holy Trinity, Dorchester, and a member of the Westminster Assembly in 1643. Humphrey Gower was born at Brampton Bryan in 1638 and educated at St Paul's School and at Dorchester, and St. John's College, Cambridge, where he graduated B.A. in 1658, was elected to a fellowship on 23 March 1659, and proceeded M.A. in 1662. Having taken holy orders, he was successively incumbent of Hammoon, Dorset, to which living he was presented in April 1663, of Packlesham (1667–1675), of Newton in the Isle of Ely (1675–1677), and of Fen Ditton, to which he was collated on 4 July 1677.

On 11 July 1679 he was appointed to the mastership of Jesus College, Cambridge, which he resigned for that of St. John's on 3 December following, having in the meantime (1 November) been appointed prebendary of Ely Cathedral. He was vice-chancellor of the university in 1680-1, and in that capacity, on 18 September 1681, he headed a deputation of dons which waited on Charles II at Newmarket. On the 17th he entertained Charles at dinner at St. John's, made him two Latin speeches, and gave him an English bible; there was much festivity both in town and university, and the conduits ran with wine.

On 29 June 1688 Gower was appointed Lady Margaret's professor of divinity. In July 1693, twenty of the Fellows of his college being nonjurors, a peremptory mandamus was issued against him requiring him to eject them. Gower defended his Fellows; he refused on the ground that the mandamus should not have been made peremptory in the first instance. Steps were at once taken to indict him at the Cambridge assizes, but the grand jury threw out the bill. A mandamus nisi issued in the following October, but, the names of the nonjuring fellows having been omitted, Gower again refused to eject them, alleging that it did not appear who they were, and the court of king's bench declined to make the mandamus peremptory. The matter was then allowed to drop.

Gower died at St. John's College on 27 March 1711, and was buried in the college chapel. By his will he left money towards providing livings for the college, and for scholarships, and left his books to the college library.

== Works ==
Gower published:

- A Discourse delivered in two Sermons in the Cathedral of Ely in September 1684, Cambridge, 1685.
- A Sermon preached before the King at Whitehall on Christmas Day, 1684, London, 1685.

He also wrote a biographical sketch of John Milner, the nonjuring vicar of Leeds, who died at St. John's College, Cambridge, on 16 February 1702 (in Thoresby's Vicaria Leodiensis, p. 113).

== Notes ==
Academic offices
Preceded by Edmund Boldero	Master of Jesus College, Cambridge; 1679–1679	Succeeded by William Saywell
Preceded by Francis Turner	Master of St John's College, Cambridge; 1679–1711	Succeeded by Robert Jenkin
