= In re Electronic Privacy Information Center =

In Re Electronic Privacy Information Center
- Supreme Court of the United States

Submitted July 8, 2013 Decided November 18, 2013
- Full case name: In Re Electronic Privacy Information Center

Holding
- Petition denied

Court membership
- Chief Justice John Roberts Associate Justices Antonin Scalia · Anthony Kennedy; Clarence Thomas · Ruth Bader Ginsburg; Stephen Breyer · Samuel Alito; Sonia Sotomayor · Elena Kagan

In Re Electronic Privacy Information Center, 134 S.Ct. 638 (2013), was a direct petition to the Supreme Court of the United States regarding the National Security Agency's (NSA) telephony metadata collection program. On July 8, 2013, the Electronic Privacy Information Center (EPIC) filed a petition for a writ of mandamus and prohibition, or a writ of certiorari, to vacate an order of the Foreign Intelligence Surveillance Court (FISC) in which the court compelled Verizon to produce telephony metadata records from all of its subscribers' calls and deliver those records to the NSA. On November 18, 2013, the Supreme Court denied EPIC's petition.

== Background ==
The Foreign Intelligence Surveillance Act (FISA) is a United States federal law which prescribes procedures for the physical and electronic surveillance and collection of "foreign intelligence information" between "foreign powers" and "agents of foreign powers" (which may include American citizens and permanent residents suspected of espionage or terrorism). The Act created the FISC to oversee the FISA requests. The FISC is a secret court populated with judges appointed by the Chief Justice of the Supreme Court of the United States. The secret nature of the court means that all proceedings are behind closed doors and all decisions are classified. Concerns about the government's surveillance efforts and its use of the Patriot Act were present for years before the case. Two members of the Senate Intelligence Committee, Senator Ron Wyden (D-OR) and Senator Mark Udall (D-CO), had been warning the public about this issue, although they were unable to go into detail because of the confidential nature of the information. In 2012, they wrote an open letter to Attorney General Eric Holder about this issue, saying, "We believe most Americans would be stunned to learn the details of how these secret court opinions have interpreted Section 215 of the Patriot Act."

On June 6, 2013, The Washington Post and The Guardian published a classified FISC order leaked by Edward Snowden. The leaked order compelled Verizon to produce telephony metadata records on an ongoing daily basis to the NSA. This disclosure of the bulk telephony metadata collection initiated public debate about the constitutionality of NSA's surveillance program and brought forth the question of whether the FISC court had exceeded its statutory authority in granting the Verizon order. EPIC, the petitioner in this action, is a public interest research center focused on First Amendment and other constitutional issues of privacy, open government, free speech, and other civil liberties.

== Facts ==
The Federal Bureau of Investigation (FBI) filed an application with the FISC to compel Verizon to produce telephony metadata from its customers' calls for 90 days. According to the FISA order, telephony metadata includes "comprehensive communications routing information, including but not limited to session identifying information (e.g., originating and terminating telephone number, International Mobile Subscriber Identity (IMSI) number, International Mobile station Equipment Identity (IMEI) number, etc.), trunk identifier, telephone calling card numbers, and time and duration of call. Telephony metadata does not include the substantive content of any communication, as defined by 18 U.S.C. § 2510(8), or the name, address, or financial information of a subscriber or customer."

On April 25, 2013, the FBI was successful in getting the FISC to grant a FISA order compelling Verizon to produce the metadata of its entire customer base for 90 days and provide it to the National Security Agency (NSA). Judge Roger Vinson presided over the proceeding. This particular FISA order came to light as part of the uncovering actions taken by Edward Snowden.

== EPIC's Petition ==
=== Requirements for Writ of Mandamus ===
Mandamus is a remedy available for "extraordinary circumstances amounting to a judicial 'usurpation of power'" or a "clear abuse of discretion," and is guided by 28 U.S.C. § 1651(a) and Supreme Court Rule 20.1.

The Supreme Court and all courts established by Act of Congress may issue all writs necessary or appropriate in aid of their respective jurisdictions and agreeable to the usages and principles of law.

— 28 U.S.C. § 1651(a) (All Writs Act)

Issuance by the Court of an extraordinary writ authorized by 28 U.S.C. § 1651(a) is not a matter of right, but of discretion sparingly exercised. To justify the granting of any such writ, the petition must show that the writ will be in aid of the Court’s appellate jurisdiction, that exceptional circumstances warrant the exercise of the Court’s discretionary powers, and that adequate relief cannot be obtained in any other form or from any other court.

— Supreme Court Rule 20.1

Cheney v. United States District Court laid out three conditions to using this type of relief: "(1) the party must have no other adequate means to attain the relief he deserves, (2) the party must satisfy the burden of showing that his right to issuance of the writ is clear and indisputable, and (3) the issuing court must be satisfied that the writ is appropriate under the circumstances."

=== EPIC's Arguments ===
In EPIC's filing, it laid out the following arguments for why the Supreme Court should grant the Petition:

1. EPIC cannot obtain relief from any other court or forum

a. EPIC cannot seek relief from the FISC or Court of Review
b. No other court can grant EPIC the relief it seeks

2. The FISC order exceeded the scope of the FISC's jurisdiction under the FISA

a. Mandamus aids the Court's appellate jurisdiction when it prevents a lower court from exceeding its lawful authority
b. The FISC lacks the legal authority to order programmatic domestic surveillance under 50 U.S.C. § 1861

3. The FISC order creates exceptional circumstances warranting mandamus

a. Telephony metadata reveals significant private information about EPIC and millions of other americans
b. EPIC is in active litigation against the very agencies tracking EPIC's privileged attorney-client communications
c. EPIC confidentially communicates with members of congress, agency officials, journalists, and others to further its First Amendment-protected advocacy
d. The FISC order compels disclosure of judicial and congressional communications, raising separation of powers concerns

==== Statutory authority ====
EPIC asked the Court to consider whether the FISC was acting beyond its authority by applying the FISA order to telephonic communications that were "wholly within the United States, including local telephone calls." Under FISA, the FBI "may make an application for an order requiring the production of any tangible things . . . for an investigation to obtain foreign intelligence information not concerning a United States person or to protect against international terrorism or clandestine intelligence activities." EPIC challenged the connection between the FISA order and the government's anti-terrorist efforts, arguing that "[i]t is simply unreasonable to conclude that all telephone records for all Verizon customers in the United States could be relevant to an investigation" (emphasis added).

==== Jurisdiction and relief ====
Is the Supreme Court the appropriate forum for this case? Would the FISC or the United States Foreign Intelligence Surveillance Court of Review (FISCR) be a better place for this to be heard? EPIC argues that those courts would not have the authority to provide the relief it seeks. However, at least one academic is of the belief that this is an erroneous argument and that starting in one of those two lower courts would, even if denied, provide a better path to the Supreme Court.

== Amicus briefs ==
There were four amicus briefs filed with the Court: (1) brief amici curiae of Professors of Information Privacy and Surveillance Law; (2) brief amici curiae of Professors James E. Pfander, and Stephen I. Vladeck; (3) brief amici curiae of Former Members of the Church Committee, and Law Professors; and (4) brief amicus curiae of Cato Institute. All four briefs were in support of the Petitioner EPIC.

== Decision ==
On November 18, 2013, the Supreme Court denied EPIC's petition, likely on procedural grounds. In its October 11, 2013 response to EPIC's petition, the government had also argued that the proper procedure would be to first file an action in a federal district court.

== Effects of the decision ==
By denying EPIC's petition, the Supreme Court avoided having to wrestle with the privacy issue at hand. There are, however, other cases addressing the same or similar issues in the pipeline, such as ACLU v. Clapper, that the Supreme Court may choose to hear arguments for and write a full opinion.
