= Thomas Comber (dean of Durham) =

English churchman

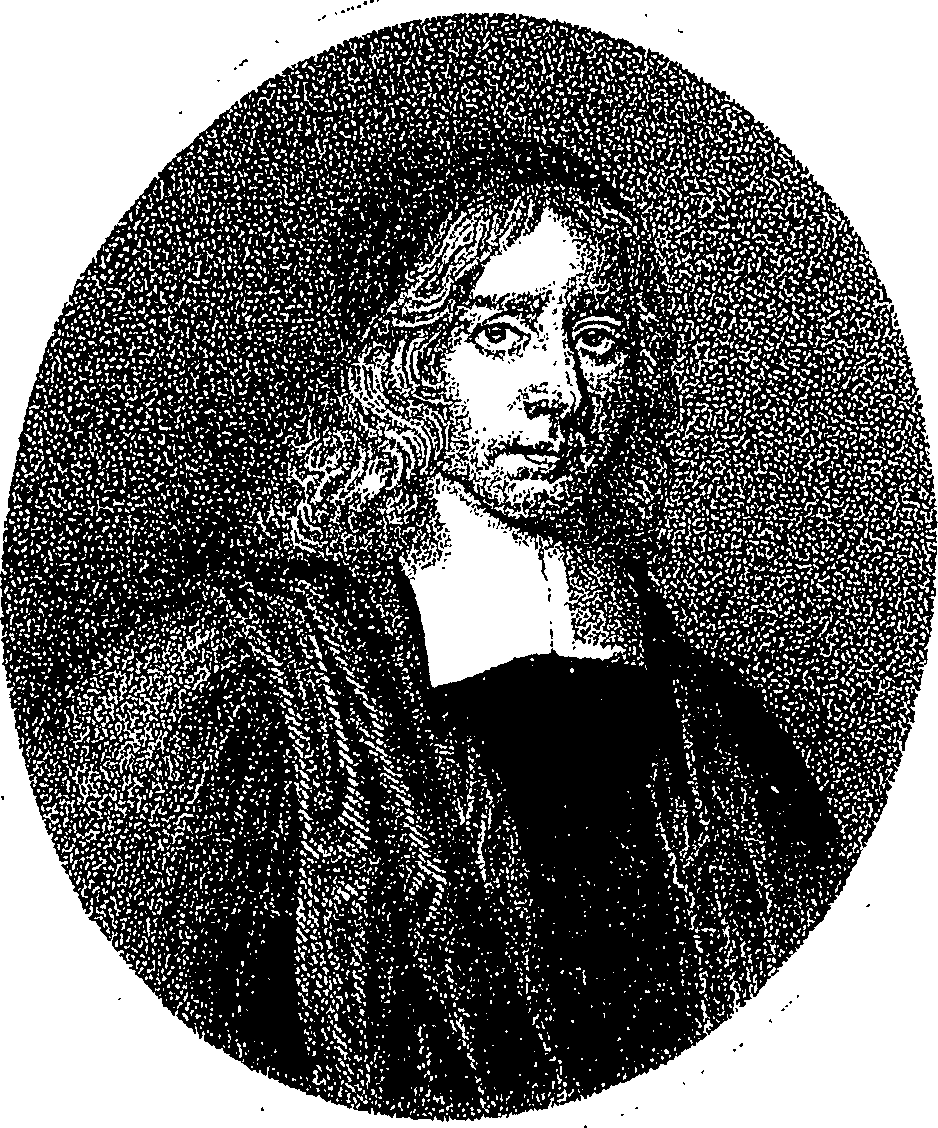
Thomas Comber

Thomas Comber (1645–1699) was an English churchman, Dean of Durham from 1689.

== Life ==
From a family at Barkham, Sussex, his father, James Comber, was the fourth son of John Comber, who was uncle to Thomas Comber, Dean of Carlisle. His mother was Mary, daughter of Bryan Burton of Westerham, Kent, and widow of Edward Hampden. Thomas was born at Westerham on 19 March 1645; his father was driven by the war to take refuge in Flanders for four years, during which time his son was left entirely under the care of his mother. His father returned to Westerham in 1649, and in the following year, Comber was placed under the tuition of the Rev. Thomas Walter. He could read and write Greek before he was ten years old.

On 18 April 1659, after some changes of school, he was admitted to Sidney Sussex College, Cambridge, under Edmund Matthews, B.D., senior fellow and president of the college. He studied experimental philosophy, geometry, astronomy, music, painting, and the oriental tongues, besides learning a common-place method for philosophy and divinity. His family was poor, but he procured an annual exhibition and received support from a relative of Dr. Richard Minshall, Master of the college. On 18 January 1663 he was chosen scholar of the house, and three days later he was admitted to the degree of B.A.

Early in 1663, he was invited to the house of one of his preceptors, Mr. Holland, now rector of All Hallows Staining, London; and having been ordained deacon on 18 August by dispensation, he read prayers on Sundays for Mr. Holland, and studied on weekdays in the library of Sion College. Soon afterwards he became curate to the Rev. Gilbert Bennet, rector of Stonegrave, Yorkshire. He was ordained priest in York Minster by Archbishop Richard Sterne on 20 September 1664, In May 1666 he performed the exercise for his degree of M.A.; the commencement was postponed in consequence of the Great Plague of London breaking out, and he was admitted to the degree by proxy. He was appointed chaplain to John Frescheville, 1st Baron Frescheville. While he was curate of Stonegrave he was invited to reside with William Thornton of East Newton, Yorkshire, and he afterwards married his daughter Alice. Here he wrote theological pieces and poetry. In 1669 Comber was inducted to the rectory of Stonegrave on Bennet's resignation.

In 1672 appeared the first instalment of his major work, the Companion to the Temple, intended to reconcile Protestant dissenters to the church of England. On 5 July 1677, he was installed prebendary of Holme in the church of York, and on 10 January 1678 he was presented, by Sir Hugh Cholmeley, 4th Baronet, to the living of Thornton-le-Clay, ten miles from Stonegrave. He obtained a dispensation to hold both livings from the Archbishop of Canterbury, who created him D.D. by patent on 28 June 1678. He obtained the prebend of Fenton in the church of York in 1681, and in the following year, he was nominated one of the chaplains to the Princess Anne. In 1683 he resigned the prebend of Fenton, and on 19 October in that year he was instituted precentor of York and prebendary of Driffield. Soon afterwards he went into residence at York, and was put into the commission of the peace. He was also chosen as one of the proctors of the chapter of York in the convocation of the northern province.

In the reign of James II, he refused to attend the chapter held on 25 August 1688 for the suspension of the Rev. Mr. Lawson, in compliance with an order of the Court of High Commission. When the king sent a silver crozier to York, and a congé d'élire with a recommendation of Dr. Smith, a Roman Catholic, the precentor determined to accept the invitation formerly given him by the Princess of Orange to take refuge with her. When William III and Mary II were proclaimed at York, he preached in the cathedral to a large audience. King William restored him to the office of justice of the peace after a year's suspension, and on 19 July 1689, he took the necessary oaths. His old friend John Tillotson procured for him the deanery of Durham, in succession to Dr. Dennis Grenville, a nonjuror. He was installed on 9 May 1691.

He died on 25 November 1699 at East Newton, and was buried in Stonegrave church.

== Works ==
His works, in addition to some occasional sermons, are:

- A Companion to the Temple and Closet; or a help to publick and private devotion, in an Essay upon the daily Offices of the Church, 2 parts, London, 1672–6; 2nd edition, with additions, 2 parts, London, 1676–9; 4 parts, London, 1684 and 1688; 4th edition, 1701–2. Part 1 Morning and Evening Prayer Part 2 The Litany with the Occasional Prayers and Thanksgivings A new edition was published at the Clarendon Press (7 vols., Oxford, 1841,) without addition, and omitting the preface to Comber's later editions. This is the most complete book extant on the Book of Common Prayer, with full references to authorities. Succeeding writers on the subject were indebted to it, particularly Wheatley.
- Roman Forgeries in the Councils during the first four centuries (with appendix), 1673, 2 parts; London, 1689. Reprinted in Edmund Gibson's Preservative against Popery, Volume xv pages 89 to 243.
- Friendly and Seasonable Advice to the Roman Catholics of England, 1674 (anon.) To the 4th edition (1685) the author prefixed his name. A new edition, with an appendix and notes by Walter Farquhar Hook, appeared in 1836 and elicited a reply from "Julius Vindex" entitled A Letter to the Rev. W. F. Hook, proving the truth of the Roman Catholic Religion from Protestant authority alone, London [1847].
- A Companion to the Altar; or a help to the worthy receiving of the Lord's Supper London, 1675; 4th edition, 2 parts, London, 1685; 6th edition, 2 parts, London, 1721.
- The Right of Tithes (anon.) In answer to Elwood the Quaker.
- Christianity No Enthusiasm, or, The Several kinds of Inspirations and revelations pretended to by the Quakers, London, 1678.
- The Occasional Offices of Matrimony, Visitation of the Sick, Burial of the Dead, Churching of Women, and the Commination, explained in the method of the Companion to the Temple: being the fourth and last part, London, 1679.
- Religion and Loyalty, a political pamphlet, 1681.
- An Historical Vindication of the Divine Right of Tithes, from Scripture, Reason, and the Opinion and Practice of Jews, Gentiles, and Christians in All Ages. Designed to Supply the Omissions, Answer the Objections, and Rectifie the Mistakes of Mr. [John] Selden's History of Tithes., London, 1682; 2nd edition, 1685.
- Short Discourses upon the whole Common Prayer, designed to inform the judgment and excite the devotion of such as daily use the same, London, 1684; 2nd edition, 1688; 3rd edition, 1702; 4th edition, 1712.
- A Discourse concerning Excommunication, London [1684].
- The Church Catechism, with a brief and easy explanation thereof, London, 1686.
- The plausible Arguments of a Romish Priest answered from Scripture by an English Protestant, London, 1686; 1687; 1688; 1735; York [1800 ?].
- A Discourse concerning the daily frequenting the Common Prayer, London, 1687.
- A Discourse of Duels, London, 1687.
- A Discourse concerning the second Council of Nice, which first introduced and established Image-worship in the Christian Church, anno Domini 787, London, 1688, (anon.) Reprinted in Gibson's Preservative against Popery, Volume vii pages 373 to 397, and Volume viii pages 1 to 29
- A Scholastical History of the primitive and general use of Liturgies in the Christian Church, London, 1690.
- The Examiner examined; being a Vindication of the History of Liturgies, London, 1691. In reply to Samuel Bold.
- The Church History clear'd from the Roman Forgeries and Corruptions found in the Councils and Baronius. Being the third and fourth parts of the Roman Forgeries, London, 1695.
- A Discourse on the Offices for the V of November, XXX th of January, and XXIX th of May, London, 1696.

Comber supported the Glorious Revolution, and published two pamphlets in defence of the government: A modest Vindication of the Protestants of England who joined with the Prince of Orange; and An Apology for the Oath of Allegiance. When the French invasion was projected in 1692, he published a pamphlet called The Pretences of the French Invasion examined for the information of the People of England; and in the preface to a new edition of William King's State of the Protestants of Ireland he undertook to show that James II carried on the design of destroying liberty, property, and Protestantism.

His great-grandson, the Rev. Thomas Comber, published Memoirs of the Life and Writings of Thomas Comber, D.D. London, 1799, (with portrait).

== Family ==
Comber married in 1668 Alice, eldest daughter of William Thornton of East Newton, by Alice Wandesford Thornton his wife, younger daughter of Sir Christopher Wandesford of Kirklington, Lord Deputy of Ireland and Alice Osborne. With this lady, who died on 20 January 1720, aged 87, he had four sons and two daughters.

== Notes ==
Attribution

This article incorporates text from a publication now in the public domain: Stephen, Leslie, ed. (1887). "Comber, Thomas (1645-1699)". Dictionary of National Biography. Vol. 11. London: Smith, Elder & Co.
