= Robert Jenkin =

English clergyman and academic

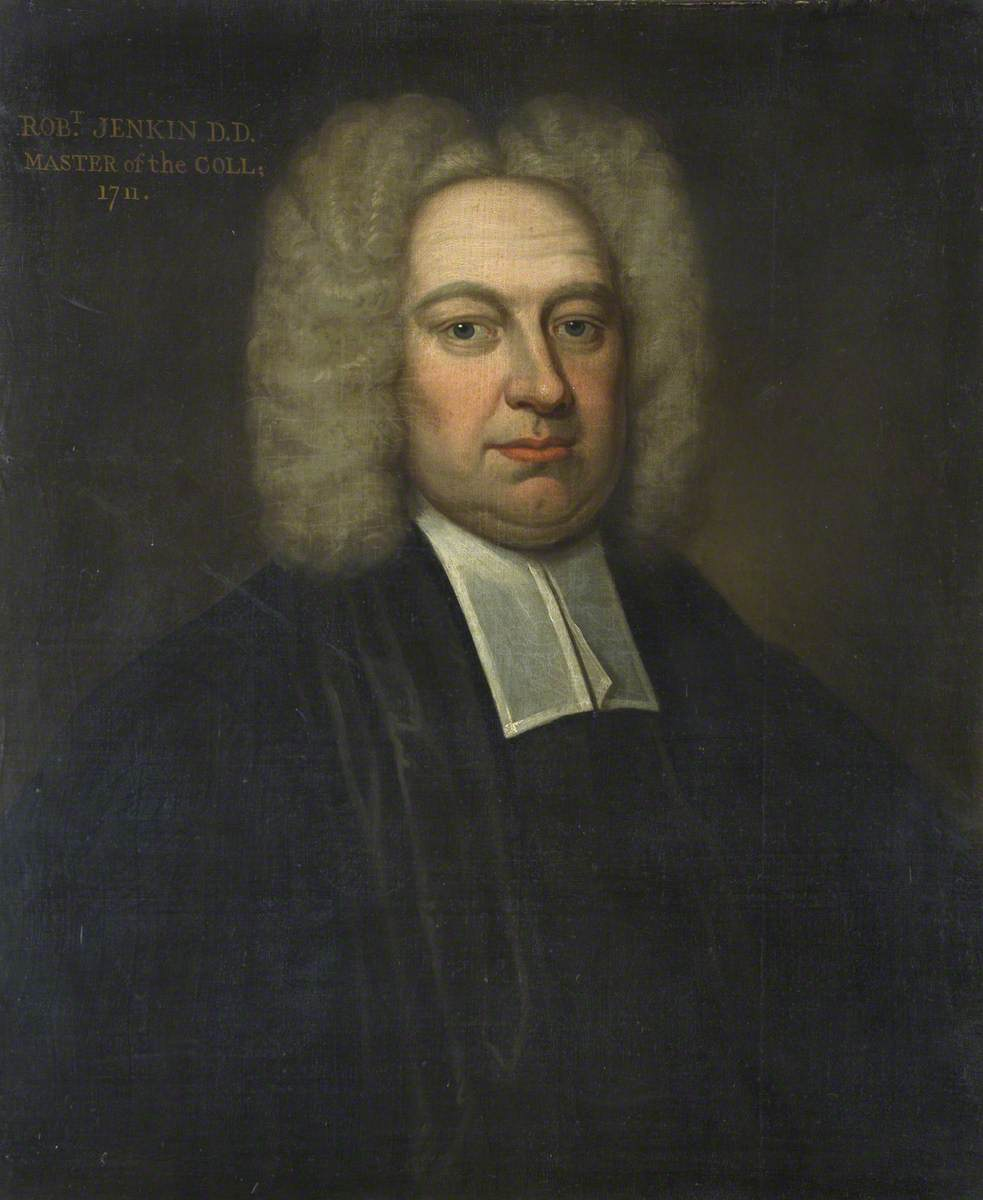
Robert Jenkin

Robert Jenkin (31 January 1656 – 7 April 1727) was an English clergyman, a nonjuror of 1698, later Master of St John's College, Cambridge, Lady Margaret's Professor of Divinity, and opponent of John Locke.

== Life ==
He was son of Thomas and Mary Jenkin of the Isle of Thanet, Kent, baptised in the parish of Minster on 31 January 1656. He was educated in the King's School, Canterbury, and at St John's College, Cambridge. He graduated B.A. in 1678; was admitted a fellow of St John's on the foundress's foundation 30 March 1680; and proceeded M.A. in 1681. After taking orders he was collated by Bishop Francis Turner to the vicarage of Waterbeach, Cambridgeshire, which he held with his fellowship. He also became chaplain to Bishop John Lake of Chichester, who collated him 1688 to the precentorship of Chichester Cathedral. He was one of the subscribers to Bishop Lake's declaration on his deathbed (27 August 1689) of his adherence to the doctrines of the Church of England, part of which consisted of passive obedience and non-resistance.

At the Glorious Revolution he declined to take the oath of allegiance to William III, and gave up his ecclesiastical preferments, but was allowed to retain his fellowship. In 1690 he was appointed domestic chaplain to Algernon Capell, 2nd Earl of Essex and he was residing at Burghley as late as February 1698. In 1700 he was created D.D. He was then or soon after residing in the family of Thomas Thynne, 1st Viscount Weymouth at Longleat, Wiltshire.

His political opinions changed, and he was able to take the oaths to Queen Anne. He became master of St John's College, 13 April 1711, on the death of Humphrey Gower, whom he also succeeded the same year as Lady Margaret's Professor of Divinity. On the accession of George I he was reluctantly compelled to eject all the fellows of his college who refused the abjuration oath. His mind failed for some years before his death, and he moved to his elder brother's house at South Runcton, Norfolk, where he died on 7 April 1727. He was buried in Holme Chapel in South Runcton, where a mural monument with a Latin inscription, was erected to his memory.

== Works ==
His works are

- 'An Historical Examination of the Authority of General Councils: shewing the false dealing that hath been used in the publishing of them; and the difference among the Papists themselves about their number,' 2nd edition, London, 1668. Reprinted in Edmund Gibson's Preservative against Popery, ed. 1738, vol. iii.; ed. 1848-9, vol. xv.
- 'A Defence of the Profession which . . . John [Lake], late Lord Bishop of Chichester, made upon his Deathbed concerning Passive Obedience and the New Oaths; together with an Account of some Passages in his Lordship's Life,' London, 1690.
- 'The Reasonableness and Certainty of the Christian Religion,' 2 vols., London, 1696-7, dedicated to the Earl of Exeter; 2nd edition, 2 vols., 1700; 3rd edition, corrected and enlarged, 2 vols., London, 1708, though this edition is described on the title-page of vol. ii. as the second; 4th edition, 1715; 5th edition, 1721; 6th edition, 1734. A French translation was published at Amsterdam in 1696. 'A Plain Introduction to the Principles of Natural and Revealed Religion . . .exhibiting much of the substance of Dr. Jenkin's work on the same subject. By a Clergyman of the Church of England' [John Plumtre], was published in 2 vols., Kidderminster, 1705.
- 'An Account of the Life of Apollonius Tyanaeus,' translated from the French of Le Nain de Tillemont, 1702. 'A brief Confutation of the Pretences against Natural and Revealed Religion,' 1702.
- 'Defensio S. Augustini adversus Johannis Perephoni [Jean Le Clerc] in ejus Opera Animadversiones,' 1707; editio altera, Lond. 1738.
- 'Remarks on some Books lately publish'd; viz. Basnage's "History of the Jews," Whiston's "Eight Sermons", Lock's Paraphrase and Notes on St. Paul's epistles. Le Clerc's "Bibliotheque Choisie," London 1709.
- 'De Potestate Ecclesiastica Praelectiones in Schola Theologica Cantab, habitae,' 1711, &c. (manuscript in the library of St. John's College, Cambridge).

Both The Reasonableness and Certainty of the Christian Religion (volume 1) and Remarks on some Books lately publish'd contain extended attacks on the writings of John Locke.

== Family ==
His wife Susannah, daughter of William Hatfield, alderman and merchant of Lynn, Norfolk, died in 1713, aged 46. By her he had a son Henry and a daughter Sarah, who both died young in 1727. Another daughter Sarah survived him.

== Notes ==
Academic offices
Preceded by Humphrey Gower	Master of St John's College, Cambridge; 1711–1727	Succeeded by Robert Lambert
