= Edward Gee (priest, born 1657) =

English churchman

Edward Gee (1657–1730) was an English churchman, known as a controversialist, and later successively Dean of Peterborough and Dean of Lincoln.

== Life ==
The son of George Gee of Manchester, a shoemaker, he was baptised at Manchester Collegiate Church on 29 August 1657. After attending Manchester Grammar School, he was admitted a sub-sizar at St John's College, Cambridge, on 9 May 1676. He graduated B.A. in 1679 and M.A. in 1683. He was incorporated in his master's degree at Oxford 4 March 1684. Subsequently, he is styled D.D., a Lambeth degree from 1695.

He took a prominent part in the anti-Catholic controversy towards the end of James II's reign. In May 1688 he was appointed rector of St Benet's, Paul's Wharf, London, and soon after he was called chaplain in ordinary to William III and Mary II. On 6 December 1701 he was installed prebendary of Westminster.

Twenty years afterwards, on 9 December 1721, he was instituted dean of Peterborough, but he resigned that office for the deanery of Lincoln, to which he was presented by the crown on 30 March 1722. A few days later he was installed prebendary of Lincoln. At the time of his death he was also incumbent of St Margaret's, Westminster, and rector of Chevening, Kent. He died on 1 March 1730, and was buried in Westminster Abbey.

== Works ==
He wrote the following quarto tracts:

- Veteres Vindicati, in an expostulatory letter to Mr. Sclater of Putney, 1687.
- An Answer to the Compiler of the Nubes Testium, 1688.
- A Vindication of the Principles of the Author of the Answer, 1688.
- The Primitive Fathers no Papists, 1688.
- The Judgment of Archbishop Cranmer concerning the People's Right to, and discreet Use of, the Holy Scriptures, 1689.
- A Letter to Father Lewis Sabran (on Invocation of Saints), 1688. Against Louis de Sabran.
- A Second Letter to Sabran, 1688.
- A Third Letter to Sabran, 1688.
- A Letter to the Superiours who approve and license the Popish Books in England, 1688.
- The Texts Examined which Papists cite out of the Bible for the Proof of their Doctrine concerning the Worship of Images and Reliques, 1688.
- The Texts examined concerning the Seven Sacraments, 1688.
- Part II. of the same work, 1688.
- The Catalogue of all the Discourses published against Popery during the Reign of King James II, 1689.

Several of these are reprinted in Edmund Gibson's Preservative against Popery, and Edward Cardwell's Enchiridion Theologicum. He also published The Jesuit's Memorial for the intended Reformation of England: with an Introduction and some Animadversions, 1690; it was written by Robert Persons. In 1692 he printed Of the Improvement of Time, a Sermon, 1692.

== Family ==
He married, on 25 January 1703, Jane, daughter of Henry Limbrey of London and Hoddington in Upton-Gray, Hampshire, and by her had several children, whose names are recorded in the Westminster Abbey registers.

== Notes ==
Attribution

This article incorporates text from a publication now in the public domain: Stephen, Leslie, ed. (1890). "Gee, Edward (1657-1730)". Dictionary of National Biography. Vol. 21. London: Smith, Elder & Co.
