= St Dunstan-in-the-West =

Coordinates: 51°30′51.3″N 00°06′36.8″W

- The Guild Church of Saint Dunstan-in-the-West
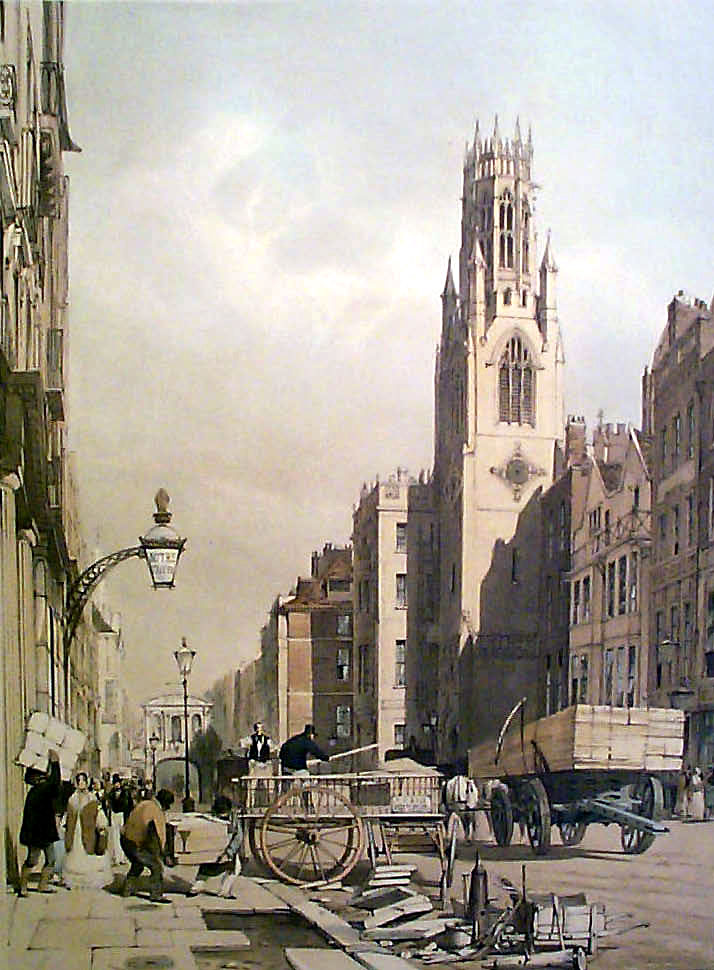
- St Dunstan-in-the-West in 1842

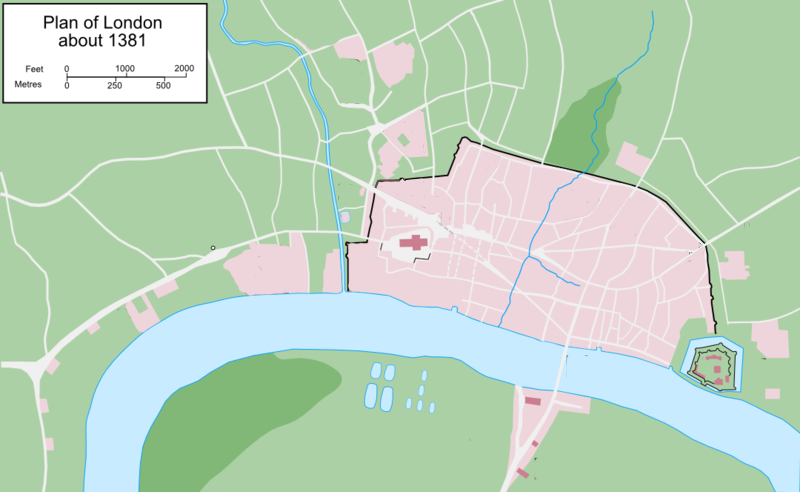
- Location within City of London Location within City of London in 1300
- Location: Farringdon Without, City of London
- Country: England
- Denomination: Church of England; Romanian Orthodox
- Previous denomination: Roman Catholic (to 1534)
- Website: stdunstaninthewest.org

History
- Founded: c. AD 988–1070
- Dedication: Dunstan

Architecture
- Heritage designation: Grade I listed building
- Architect: John Shaw Sr.
- Style: Neo-Gothic

Administration
- Province: Canterbury
- Diocese: London

Clergy
- Bishop: Sarah Mullally
- Vicar(s): Rev. Canon Anthony Howe, MA FSA
- Priest: Silviu Petre Pufulete (Romanian Orthodox)

The Guild Church of St Dunstan-in-the-West is in Fleet Street in the City of London. It is dedicated to Dunstan, Bishop of London and Archbishop of Canterbury. The church is of medieval origin, although the present building, with an octagonal nave, was constructed in the 1830s to the designs of John Shaw.

== History ==
=== Medieval church ===
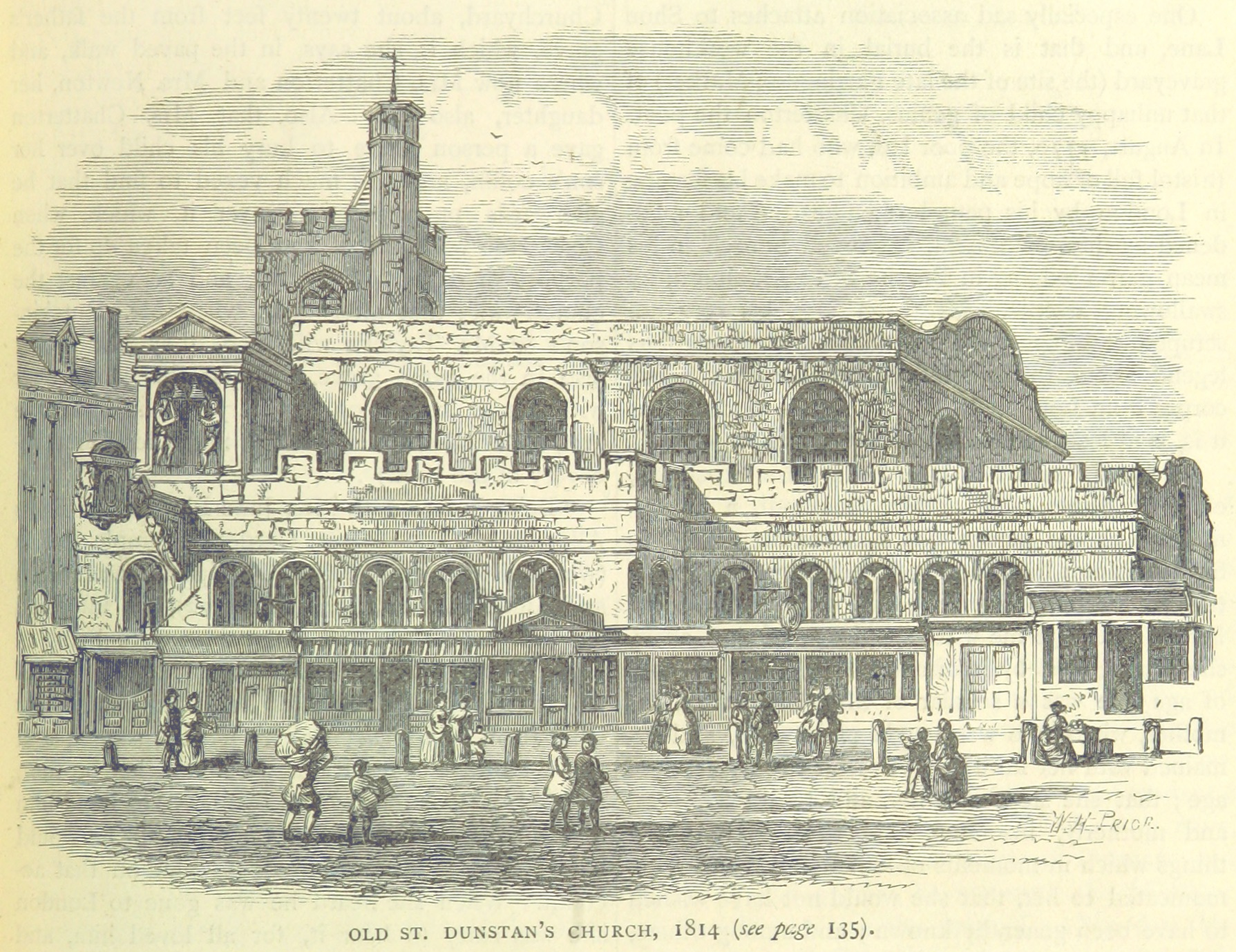
Old St Dunstan's Church in 1814, with the exterior clock prominent on the left

It is first mentioned in written records in 1185, but there is no evidence of the date of its original foundation. There is speculation that it might have been erected by Dunstan himself, or by priests who knew him well. Others suggest a foundation date of between AD 988 (death of St Dunstan) and 1070. Another speculation is that a church on this site was one of the Lundenwic strand settlement churches, like St Martin in the Fields, the first St Mary le Strand, St Clement Danes and St Bride's, which may pre-date any within the walls of the City of London.

King Henry III gained possession of it and its endowments from Westminster Abbey by 1237, and then granted these and the advowson to the Domus Conversorum ('House of the Converts,' i.e., of converted Jews), which led to neglect of its parochial responsibilities.

William Tyndale, the celebrated translator of the Bible, was a lecturer at the church; the poet John Donne was at one time vicar, and delivered sermons. Samuel Pepys mentions the church in his diary. The church narrowly escaped the Great Fire of London in 1666. The Dean of Westminster roused 40 scholars from Westminster School in the middle of the night, who formed a fire brigade that extinguished the flames with buckets of water; the flames reached a point three doors away.

The medieval church underwent many alterations before its demolition in the early 19th century. Small shops were built against its walls, and St Dunstan's Churchyard became a centre for bookselling and publishing. Later repairs were carried out in an Italianate style: rusticated stonework was used, and some of the Gothic windows were replaced with round-headed ones, resulting in what George Godwin called "a most heterogeneous appearance". The church's old vaulted roof was replaced in 1701 with a flat ceiling, ornamented with recessed panels.

The Worshipful Company of Cordwainers has been associated with the church since the 15th century. The company holds an annual service of commemoration to honour two of its benefactors, John Fisher and Richard Minge; by tradition, following the service, children were given a penny for each time they ran around the church.

=== Rebuilding ===
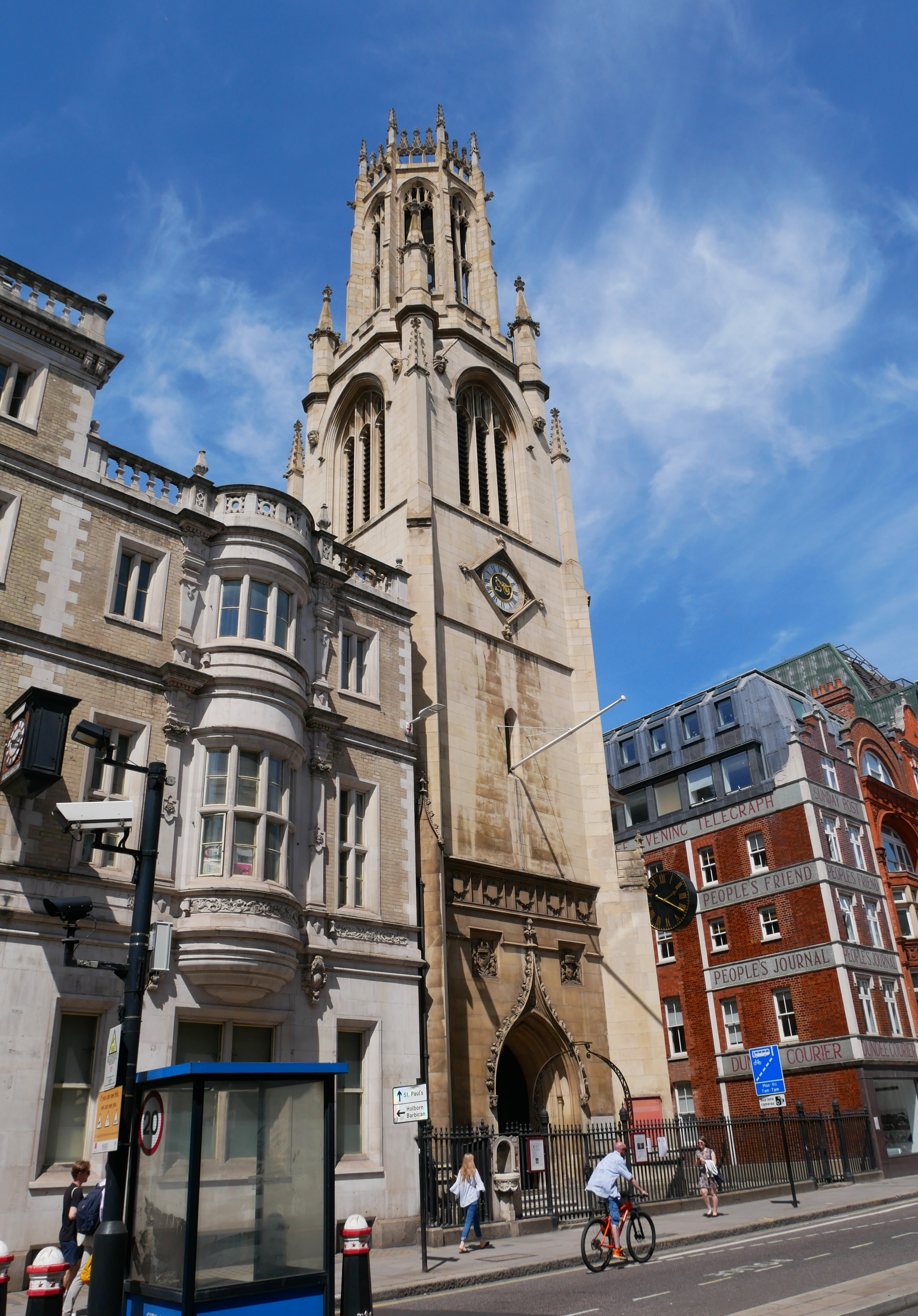
Southwest view of St Dunstan-in-the-West (2022)

In the early 19th century the medieval church of St Dunstan was removed to allow the widening of Fleet Street, and a new church was built on its burial ground. An Act of Parliament was obtained in July 1829 which authorised the demolition of the church, and trustees were appointed to carry it into effect. Auctions of some of the materials of the old church took place in December 1829 and September 1830. The first stone of the new building, to the design of John Shaw Sr. (1776–1832), was laid in July 1831 and construction proceeded rapidly. In August 1832 the last part of the old church, which had been left as a screen between Fleet Street and the new work, was removed.

Shaw dealt with the restricted site by designing a church with an octagonal central space. Seven of the eight sides open into arched recesses, the northern one containing the altar. The eighth side opens into a short corridor, leading beneath the organ to the lowest stage of the tower, which serves as an entrance porch. Above the recesses Shaw designed a clerestory, and above that a groined ceiling. The tower is square in plan, with an octagonal lantern, resembling those of St Botolph's Church, Boston, and St Helen's, York. George Godwin suggested that the form of the lantern might have been immediately inspired by that of St George's church in Ramsgate (where Shaw was architect to the docks), built in 1825 to the designs of H. E. Kendall. John Shaw Sr. died in 1833, before the church was completed, leaving it in the hands of his son John Shaw Jr. (1803–1870).

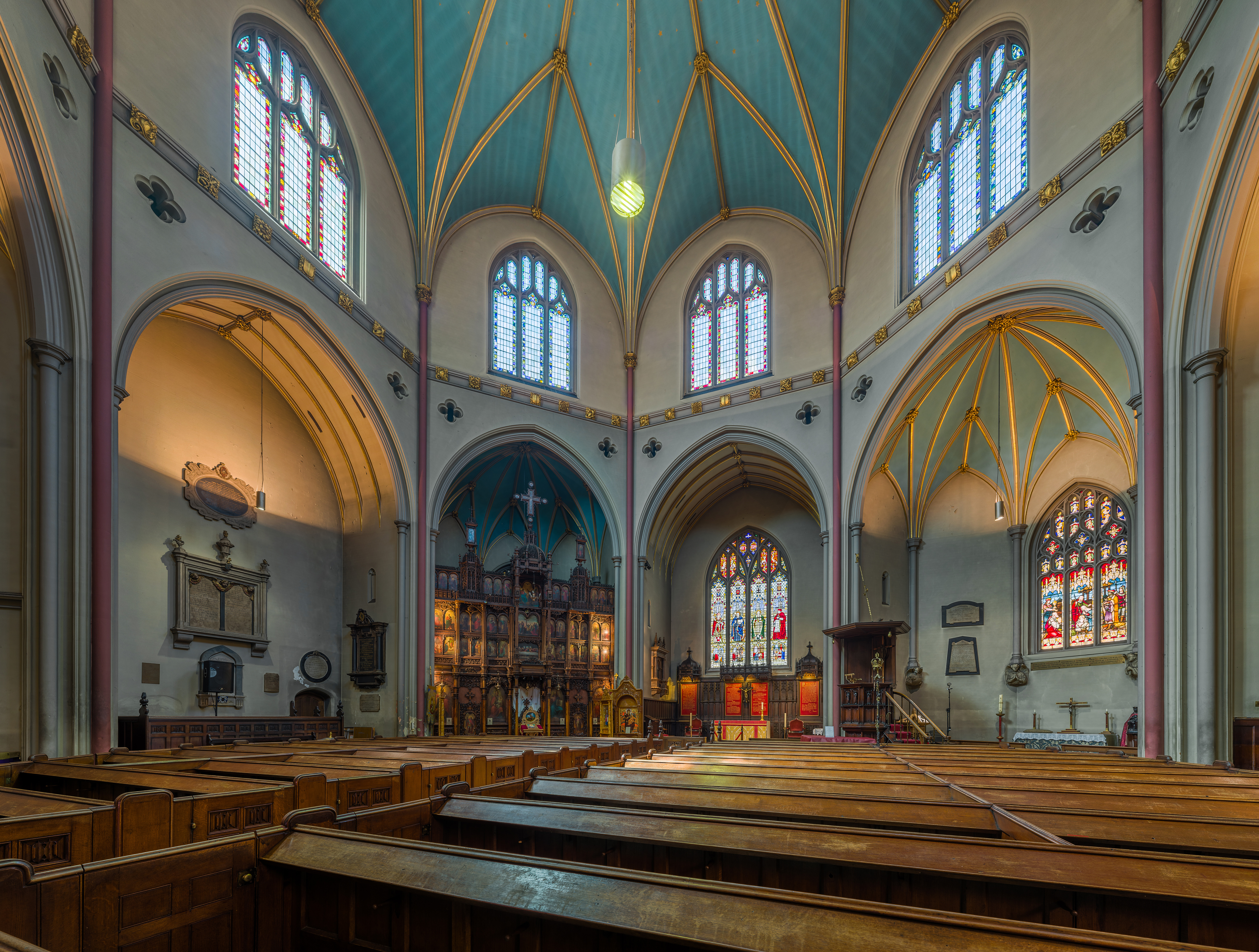
Interior of St Dunstan-in-the-West

The communion rail is a survivor of the old church, having been carved by Grinling Gibbons during the period when John Donne served as vicar (1624–1631). Some of the monuments from the medieval building were reinstituted in the new church, and a fragment of the old churchyard remains between Clifford's Inn and Bream's Buildings.

=== Twentieth century ===
Apart from losing its stained glass, the church survived the London Blitz largely intact, though bombs did damage the open-work lantern tower. The church was damaged again on 24/25 March 1944, during Operation Steinbock, a lower-intensity attack on London late in the war. The building was largely restored in 1950. An appeal to raise money to install a new ring of bells in the tower, replacing those removed in 1969, was successfully completed in 2012 with the dedication and hanging of 10 new bells.

The church was designated a Grade I listed building on 4 January 1950.

== Clock ==
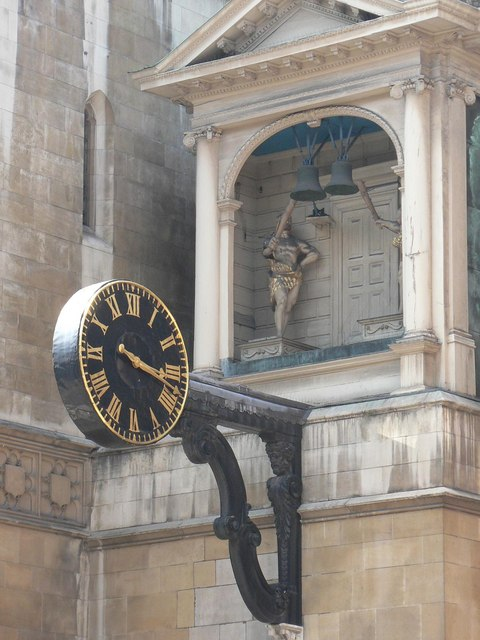
The clock, dating from 1671

On the façade is a chiming clock, with figures of giants, perhaps representing Gog and Magog, who strike the bells with their clubs. It was installed on the previous church in 1671, perhaps commissioned to celebrate its escape from destruction by the Great Fire of 1666. It was the first public clock in London to have a minute hand. The figures of the two giants strike the hours and quarters, and turn their heads. There are numerous literary references to the clock, including in Thomas Hughes' Tom Brown's Schooldays, Oliver Goldsmith's The Vicar of Wakefield; Nicholas Nickleby, Master Humphrey's Clock and Barnaby Rudge by Charles Dickens, The Warden by Anthony Trollope, the penny dreadful serial The String of Pearls (in which the character Sweeney Todd first appears), David Lyddal's "The Prompter" (1810), and a poem by William Cowper.

In 1828, when the medieval church was demolished, the clock was removed by art collector Francis Seymour-Conway, 3rd Marquess of Hertford, to Winfield House, his mansion in Regent's Park, which became known as St Dunstan's. During the First World War, Winfield House was lent as a hostel for blinded soldiers, and the new charity took the name St Dunstan's (now Blind Veterans UK).

The clock was returned by Harold Harmsworth, 1st Viscount Rothermere (the brother of Alfred Harmsworth, 1st Viscount Northcliffe) in 1935 to mark the Silver Jubilee of King George V.

== Statues and monuments ==
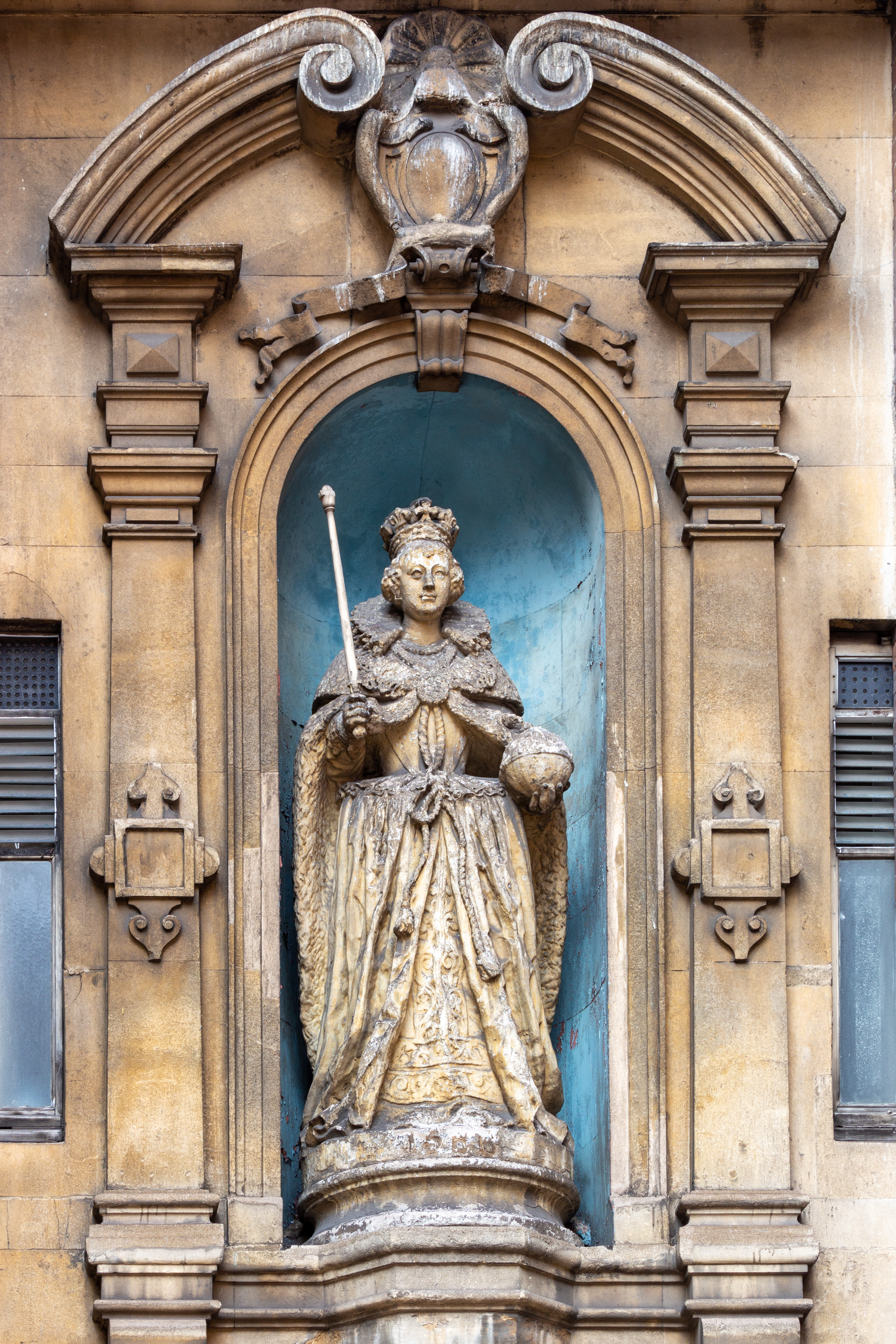
Statue of Elizabeth I

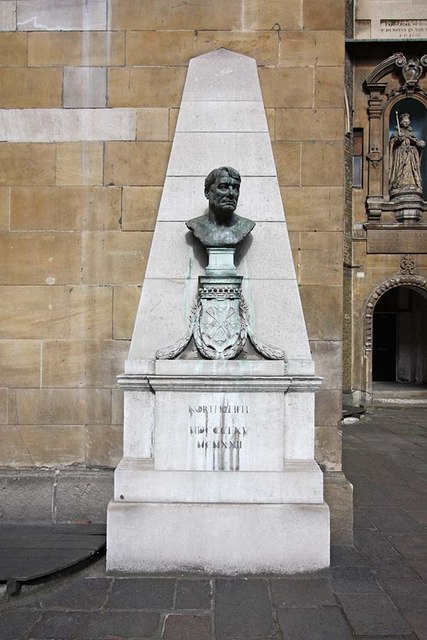
Monument to the press baron Lord Northcliffe

Above the entrance to the old parochial school is a statue of Queen Elizabeth I, taken from the old Ludgate, which was demolished in 1760. This statue, by William Kerwin and dating from 1586, is contemporaneous with its subject and thought to be the oldest outdoor statue in London. The playwright Gwen John and her sister Winifred Jones worked alongside the suffragettes Millicent and Agnes Fawcett to pay for it to be repaired. In the porch below are three statues of ancient Britons also from the gate, meant to represent King Lud and his two sons.

Adjacent to Queen Elizabeth is a memorial to Lord Northcliffe, the newspaper proprietor, co-founder of the Daily Mail and the Daily Mirror. (Fleet Street was known as the street of newspapers.) Unveiled in 1930, the obelisk was designed by Edwin Lutyens and the bronze bust is by Kathleen Scott. Next to Lord Northcliffe is a memorial tablet to James Louis Garvin, another pioneering British journalist.

Close to the font, there is a bronze memorial plaque for Thomas Mudge (1715/16–1794), inventor of the lever escapement and watchmaker to George III. The tablet was made and engraved by noted sundial maker, hand-engraver and sculptor Joanna Midgal. It was commissioned by the Worshipful Company of Clockmakers, and installed in March 2019.

Behind the iconostasis (wall of icons) to the left side of the church, high on a wall, there is a marble memorial tablet to the highly regarded seventeenth-century clockmaker Henry Jones (1634–1695), who worked in the Inner Temple, and his wife Hannah, who continued their business after his death. Jones was an apprentice of Edward East.

== Romanian Orthodox chapel ==
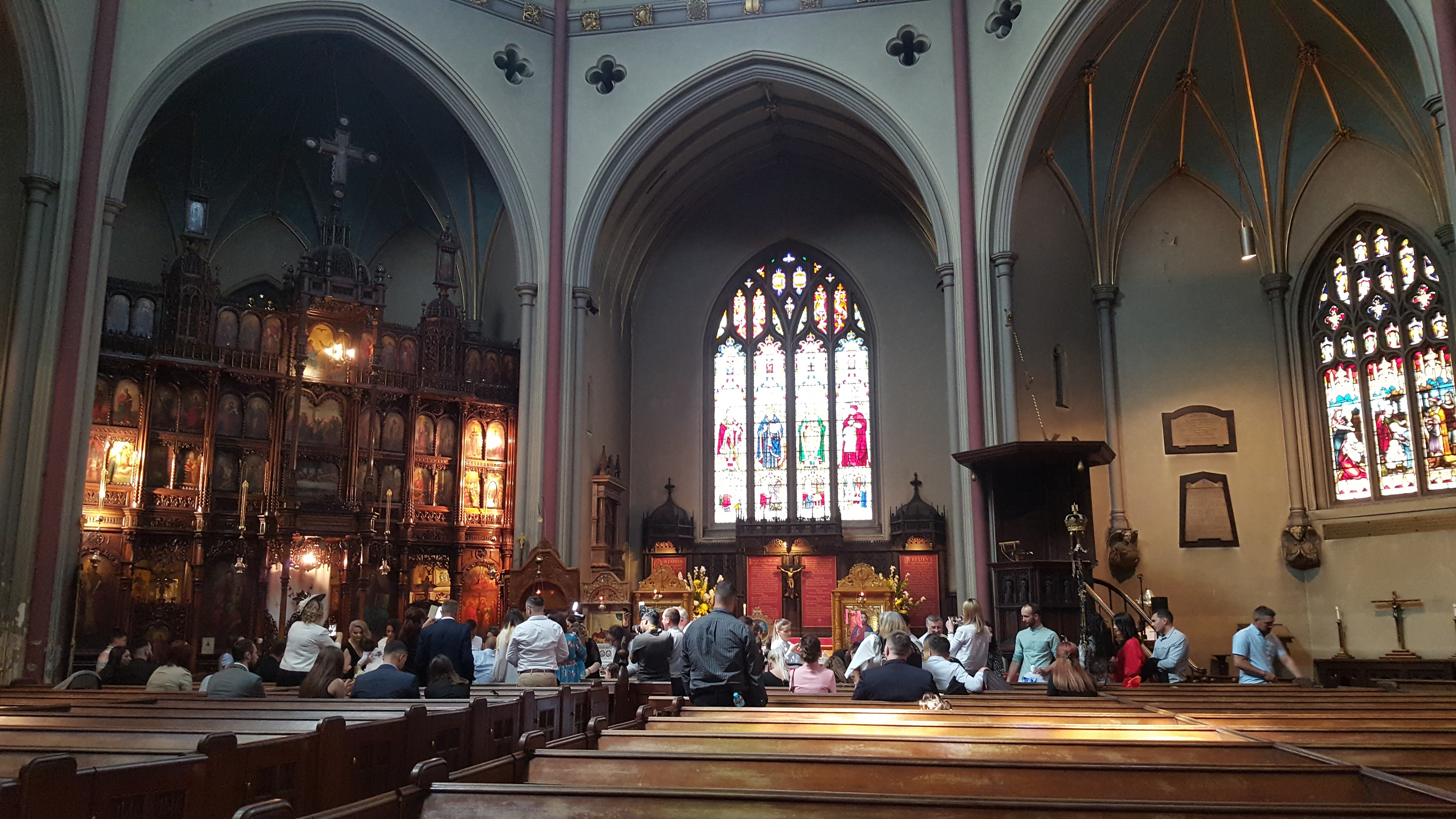
St Dunstan-in-the-West, Fleet Street

St Dunstan-in-the-West is one of the churches in England to share its building with the Romanian Orthodox community (St. George church). The chapel to the left of the main altar is closed off by an iconostasis, formerly from Antim Monastery in Bucharest, dedicated in 1966.

== Noted associations ==
The church has associations with many notable people:

- Richard Lyst, rector of the church and supporter of Anne Boleyn
- Dr Thomas Campion or Campian (1567-1620), physician, one of the most charming poets of the Elizabethan age and delicate writer of lute songs
- Philip Rosseter (1568-1623), fellow composer and intimate friend of Campian, both buried here
- Lord Baltimore, who founded Maryland, was buried here in 1632, as was his son.
- Matthew Bryan, Jacobite preacher, was buried here in 1699.
- Celebrated London clockmaker and watchmaker Charles Gretton was a warden of the church and was buried there in 1731.
- The diarist Samuel Pepys was a regular worshipper.
- Edward Latymer was a worshipper, and upon his death, in 1627, was buried in the south aisle.
- John Calvert, Master of the Worshipful Company of Turners, a prominent ivory carver of the early 19th century.
- The poet John Donne held the benefice here from 1624 to 1631 while he was Dean of St Paul's.
- William Tyndale, who pioneered the translation of the Bible into English, was a lecturer.
- Izaak Walton was a sidesman here.
- Thomas Mudge, the eminent watchmaker, was buried here in 1794.

The church has often been associated with the legend of Sweeney Todd, the 'demon-barber' of Fleet Street. This is most likely due to it being mentioned in the original penny dreadful The String of Pearls as the church bearing a crypt into which the remnants of Sweeney Todd's victims were unceremoniously dumped after they had been murdered and turned into meat pies.

== In popular culture ==
St Dunstan-in-the-West appeared as the "journalists' church" in the 2018 TV series Press. The real journalists' church is St Bride's.

== See also ==
- List of churches and cathedrals of London
