= William Payne (priest) =

English academic and cleric

William Payne (1650–1696) was an English academic and cleric of the Church of England, known as a controversialist.

== Life ==
Payne was born at Hutton, Essex, was educated at Brentwood free school, and went on to Magdalene College, Cambridge, in May 1665, graduating B.A. in 1669, and M.A. in 1672. He obtained a fellowship there on 6 July 1671, and retained it until 1675, when he married. He was in the same year presented to the livings of Frinstead and Wormshill (where he resided) in Kent.

In June 1681, Payne received the rectory of Whitechapel, and speedily won a reputation among the London clergy as a preacher. On 29 June 1682 he was chosen to preach before the first annual feast instituted at Brentwood school. After the accession of William III and Mary II in 1689, Payne, who in that year took the degree of D.D. at Cambridge, was appointed to the lectureship of the Poultry Church in the City of London, and received the post of royal chaplain in ordinary.

In 1693, Payne was appointed, by a commission under the great seal, "visitor-royal" over certain London churches sometimes called '"lawless churches", because they were exempt from visitation by the bishop, and were subject solely to the King. The appointment, however, caused resentment at Doctors' Commons, and in 1694 he resigned it. He died, on 20 February 1696.

== Works ==
Payne took an active part in the agitation of the alleged Popish Plot, writing many anti-Catholic tracts. Among those were:

- A Discourse of the Adoration of the Host (1685);
- A Discourse of the Communion in one Kind, in answer to a Treatise of the Bishop of Meaux (1687);
- The Sixth Note of the Church examined, viz. Agreement in Doctrine with the Primitive Church (1688); and
- The Texts examined which the Papists cite out of the Bible concerning the Celibacy of Priests and Vows of Continence (1688).

These tracts all went through several editions, and were collected in Edmund Gibson's Preservative against Popery (1738).

Payne strongly supported the comprehension scheme, brought forward in 1689 for facilitating the inclusion of English Dissenters in the established church. The proposal was opposed, among others, by Thomas Long, in a pamphlet on the subject, Vox Cleri; Payne replied in an Answer to Vox Cleri (1690). Denounced by nonjurors for his latitudinarian views, Payne in 1691 published An Answer to a printed Letter to Dr. William Payne, concerning Non-resistance and other Reasons for not taking the Oath.

During the last two years of his life Payne preached a series of sermons on behalf of William Sherlock, who was then defending the dogma of the Trinity against Robert South. These sermons were published in 1696 as The Mystery of the Christian Faith and oft-blessed Trinity vindicated. Payne was also author of:

- Family Religion (1691).
- A Discourse of Repentance (1693).
- Discourses upon several Practical Subjects, published in 1698 from his manuscript sermons by his friend and executor, Joseph Powell.

== Family ==
Payne married Elisabeth, daughter of John Squire, vicar of St. Leonard's, Shoreditch, London. Their son Squier Payne, fellow of Magdalene College, Cambridge (B.A. 1694, and M.A. 1698), was son-in-law to and biographer of Richard Cumberland. Made archdeacon of Stow in 1730, he held the post until 1751.
