= Matthew Bryan =

Matthew Bryan otherwise Brian (died 10 March 1699) was an English clergyman, non-juror and Jacobite preacher.

== Life ==
Bryan was the son of Robert Bryan of Limington, Somerset, sometime minister of St. Mary's, Newington, Surrey, and was born at Limington. He became a semi-commoner of Magdalen Hall, Oxford, in 1665, but left the university without taking a degree. After holding a benefice in the Diocese of Bath and Wells for about ten years, he was appointed to his father's old living, St. Mary's, Newington, and the afternoon lectureship at St. Michael's, Crooked Lane.

His living was sequestered for debt in 1684. A sermon preached by him at Newington and at St. Michael's (26 October and 2 November of the same year) on 2 Corinthians 5:11 was said to contain reflections on the King's courts of justice, and an accusation was laid against him before the Dean of Arches. In order to vindicate himself he printed this sermon, which certainly does not appear to contain any such reflections, with a dedication, dated 10 December 1684, to Peter Mews, Bishop of Winchester, formerly his diocesan in Somerset. The archbishop was satisfied that the charge against him was groundless, and it was quashed accordingly.

In July 1685 Bryan accumulated the degrees of civil law at Oxford. Refusing to take the oaths on the accession of William III and Mary II, he lost his preferment. He became the minister of a Jacobite congregation meeting in St. Dunstan's Court, Fleet Street. This brought him into trouble several times. On 1 January 1693 his meeting was discovered, the names of his congregation, consisting of about a hundred persons, were taken, and he was arrested. He died on 10 March 1699, and was buried in St. Dunstan's-in-the-West.

== Works ==
His works are: The Certainty of the future Judgment asserted and proved (the sermon referred to above), 1685 ; 'A Persuasion to the stricter Observance of the Lord's Day,' a sermon, 1686; 'St. Paul's Triumph in his Sufferings,' a sermon, 1692. In the dedication of this discourse he describes himself as M. B. Indignus έν τἣ θλ ίψει ὰξεφὸςλ κὰι σννγκοινωνός, probably in reference to his sufferings as a Jacobite preacher, the sermon itself being on Ephesians 4:1. He also wrote two copies of verses printed in Ellis Waller's translation of the Encheiridion of Epictetus into English verse, 1702, and republished Humphrey Lynde's Account of Bertram the Priest, 1686.
