= William Saywell =

English churchman and academic (1643–1701)

William Saywell (1643–1701) was an English churchman and academic, known as a controversialist, archdeacon of Ely, and Master of Jesus College, Cambridge.

== Life ==
He was son of Gabriel Saywell (died 1688), rector of Pentridge, Dorset. After a few months passed at Cranbourne school, he went in 1659 to St John's College, Cambridge, where he was admitted a sizar. He graduated A.B. in 1663, A.M. 1667. On 2 April 1666 he was elected a fellow of his college. In 1669 he was incorporated M.A. at Oxford.

In 1679 Saywell proceeded D.D., and on 8 March in the same year was installed a prebendary of Ely Cathedral. On 9 December that year, on the promotion of Humphrey Gower to the mastership of St. John's College, he was elected his successor as master of Jesus College.

On 28 November 1672 Saywell was appointed chancellor of the diocese of Chichester, and on 22 January 1681 was collated to the archdeaconry of Ely. He gave money to Jesus College, for the adornment of the hall and the purchase of advowsons. He died in London on 9 June 1701, and was buried in the chapel of his college on the 14th.

== Works ==
As a controversialist, Saywell aimed at both dissenters and Catholics. His works were:

- The Original of all Plots in Christendom: with the Danger and Remedy of Schism, London, 1681.
- A Serious Inquiry into the Means of an Happy Union; or, What Reformation is necessary to prevent Popery?, London, 1681.
- Evangelical and Catholick Unity maintained in the Church of England; or, an Apology for her Government, Liturgy, Subscriptions, London, 1682. This was a reply to Richard Baxter's Answer to the Accusations, and to John Owen's An Enquiry (1681).
- The Reformation of the Church of England justified, according to the Canons of the Council of Nice and other General Councils, Cambridge, 1688. Without author's name.
- The Necessity of adhering to the Church of England as by Law established; or, the Duty of a good Christian, and particularly of Parents and Masters of Families under the present Toleration, Cambridge, 1692.

Saywell also contributed Latin verse to Hymenæus Cantabrigiensis in 1683 and to Academiæ Cantabrigiensis Affectus in 1685.

== Notes ==
Attribution

This article incorporates text from a publication now in the public domain: Lee, Sidney, ed. (1897). "Saywell, William". Dictionary of National Biography. Vol. 50. London: Smith, Elder & Co.
