= Mandamus =

Type of judicial remedy

A writ of mandamus (/mænˈdeɪməs/; lit. ''we command'') is a judicial remedy in common law jurisdictions consisting of a court order that commands a government official or entity to perform an act it is legally required to perform as part of its official duties, or to refrain from performing an act the law forbids it from doing. Writs of mandamus are usually used in situations where a government official has failed to act as legally required or has taken a legally prohibited action. Decisions that fall within the discretionary power of public officials cannot be controlled by the writ. For example, mandamus cannot force a lower court to take a specific action on applications that have been made. However, if the court refuses to rule at all, then mandamus can be used to order the court to rule on the applications.

Mandamus may be a command to take or not take a particular action, and it is supplemented by legal rights. In the American legal system, it must be a judicially enforceable and legally protected right before one suffering a grievance can ask for a mandamus. A person can be said to be aggrieved only when they are denied a legal right by someone who has a legal duty to do something and abstains from doing it, or vice versa.

== Legal requirements ==
The party requesting a writ of mandamus to be enforced should be able to show that they have a legal right to compel the respondent to do or refrain from doing the specific act. The duty sought to be enforced must have two qualities: It must be a duty of public nature and the duty must be imperative and should not be discretionary. Furthermore, mandamus will typically not be granted if adequate relief can be obtained by some other means, such as appeal.

== Purpose ==
The purpose of mandamus is to remedy defects of justice. It lies in the cases where there is a specific right but no specific legal remedy for enforcing that right. Generally, it is not available in anticipation of any injury except when the petitioner is likely to be affected by an official act in contravention of a statutory duty or where an illegal or unconstitutional order is made. The grant of mandamus is therefore an equitable remedy, and a matter for the discretion of the court, the exercise of which is governed by well-settled principles.

Mandamus being a discretionary remedy, the application for it must be made in good faith and not for indirect purposes. Acquiescence cannot, however, bar the issue of mandamus. The petitioner must satisfy the Court that they have the legal right to the performance of the legal duty as distinct from mere discretion of authority. A mandamus is normally issued when an officer or an authority by compulsion of statute is required to perform a duty and that duty, despite a demand in writing, has not been performed. In no other case will a writ of mandamus issue unless it be to quash an illegal order.

== Types ==
There are three kinds of mandamus:

1. Alternative mandamus: A mandamus issued upon the first application for relief, commanding the defendant either to perform the act demanded or to appear before the court at a specified time to show cause for not performing it.
2. Peremptory mandamus: An absolute and unqualified command to the defendant to do the act in question. It is issued when the defendant defaults on, or fails to show sufficient cause in answer to, an alternative mandamus.
3. Continuing mandamus: A mandamus issued to a lower authority in general public interest asking the officer or the authority to perform its tasks expeditiously for an unstipulated period of time for preventing miscarriage of justice.

== In various countries ==
=== Parliamentary democracies ===
==== Australia ====
Under the Australian legal system, mandamus is available through section 75(v) of the Constitution of Australia.

==== England and Wales ====
In England and Wales, mandamus was originally known as a writ of mandamus. Historically, direct orders from the monarch to subjects commanding the performance of particular acts were common, and to this class of orders mandamus originally belonged. It became customary for the Court of King's Bench, in cases where a legal duty was established but no sufficient means existed for enforcing it, to order performance by this writ. Mandamus more recently became known as an order of mandamus. This procedure was renamed by the Civil Procedure (Modification of Supreme Court Act 1981) Order 2004 to become a mandatory order.

==== India ====
In India, the sine qua non for mandamus is the existence of a statutory public duty incumbent upon the person or body against whom the mandamus is sought. There must equally co-exist a corresponding right in the petitioner entitling him to claim the enforcement of such public duty. These two preconditions form the foundation for the issue of mandamus. The primary scope and function of mandamus is to "command" and "execute" rather than to "enquire" and "adjudicate". It cannot be issued to change the decision of a body so as to suit the petitioner. Obligations which are not of a statutory nature cannot be enforced by mandamus. The writ petition is not maintainable when a remedy provided for under the Code of Civil Procedure is available. For example, the High Court cannot entertain writ petitions for mandamus to the Government who fails to deposit and pay in the requisite time an enhanced compensation account as ordered by a lower Court. The petitioners in this case would be directed to approach the executing Court for appropriate relief.

Only the Supreme Court and High Courts are empowered to exercise writ jurisdiction, under Articles 32 and 226 of the Constitution. No other courts are empowered to issue the writ.

=== United States ===
In the United States, the writ of mandamus holds particular historical significance in constitutional law. In the landmark case Marbury v. Madison (1803), William Marbury petitioned the Supreme Court for a writ of mandamus to compel Secretary of State James Madison to deliver his judicial commission. Chief Justice John Marshall, writing for the Court, ruled that while Marbury had a right to the commission and the duty was ministerial (thus potentially subject to mandamus), the Court lacked original jurisdiction to issue the writ because Section 13 of the Judiciary Act of 1789 unconstitutionally expanded the Court's jurisdiction. This decision struck down a federal statute for the first time and established the principle of judicial review, affirming that the Supreme Court has the ultimate authority to interpret the Constitution and invalidate laws inconsistent with it. The case exemplified the traditional common-law rule that mandamus was available only for clear, ministerial duties—a limitation that has since evolved in the context of modern administrative law.

In the administrative law context in the United States, the requirement that mandamus can be used only to compel a ministerial act has largely been abandoned. Since at least Virginia v. Rives (1879) the Supreme Court has recognized that mandamus can control discretion if there has been an abuse of discretion. In most states acts of administrative agencies are now subject to judicial review for abuse of discretion. Judicial review of agencies of the United States federal government, for abuse of discretion, is authorized by the Administrative Procedure Act.

==== Federal courts ====
The authority of the United States district courts (trial courts) to issue mandamus has been expressly abrogated by Rule 81(b) of the Federal Rules of Civil Procedure, but relief in the nature of mandamus can be had by other remedies provided for in the Rules, where provided by statute, or by use of the district courts' equitable powers.

In the context of mandamus from a United States court of appeals to a district court, the Supreme Court has ruled that the appellate courts have discretion to issue mandamus to control an abuse of discretion by the lower court in unusual circumstances, where there is a compelling reason not to wait for an appeal from a final judgment. This discretion is exercised very sparingly. It is exercised with somewhat greater frequency, although still sparingly, in the context of discovery disputes involving privileged materials, since a district court order erroneously forcing the disclosure of privileged material may never be remediable through a later appeal. In the case In Re Electronic Privacy Information Center (2013), privacy advocates sought a writ of mandamus directly from the Supreme Court to halt the National Security Agency's bulk phone record collection program. The Supreme Court denied the petition.

==== State courts ====
In some state court systems, mandamus has evolved into a general procedure for discretionary appeals from non-final trial court decisions, or a procedure of obtaining review of decisions by administrative agencies. In many of the states that have adopted the Field Code, the writ is now called mandate instead of mandamus. These states are Idaho, Montana, Nevada, Utah, Washington, and California, as well as the unincorporated U.S. territory of Guam.

===== California =====
In the state of California, the writ may be issued by any level of the state court system to any lower court or to any government official. The writ of mandate is used in California for interlocutory appeals. In this context, the party seeking the writ is treated on appeal like a plaintiff, the trial court becomes the defendant, and the opponent is designated as the "real party in interest".

===== North Carolina =====
In North Carolina state courts, mandamus is authorized as one of the Extraordinary Writs, under Rule 22 of the North Carolina Rules of Appellate Procedure. The writ of mandamus may be issued in instances where, for instance, the lower court fails to timely issue a written order after rendition (thus precluding both the possibility of an appeal or enforcement of the rendition and leaving the litigants in limbo). The North Carolina Court of Appeals has spoken on the possible course of action in such situations, and confirmed that petitioning for a writ of mandamus is the only available route. In McKyer, the lawyer who was unable to persuade the trial court judge to enter an order for about a year, tried to remedy the problem by asking the trial court judge to hold another hearing. Disapproving of the attempted resolution via a new hearing, the Court of Appeals, citing the Supreme Court case In re T.H.T., explained that a party seeking recourse where the trial court has not entered its orders timely should petition for writ of mandamus.

Similarly, the writ may issue where the trial court fails or refuses to timely dispose with the litigants' business (for instance, if the judge refuses to hear a case). In North Carolina, as elsewhere, the writ is an action against the official, meaning that the petition must be styled "In re Public Figure X" or "In re Judge Y". Thus, a mandamus petition not only brings the strife of optically making the officer or judge the defendant, but also in theory requires the official / judge to respond "within ten days" "with supporting affidavits". Rule 22(c) provides that "any party" may respond to the petition for writ. The North Carolina Court of Appeals has interpreted this to mean that where, for instance, one litigant demands that the judge enter a previously rendered order, the other litigant in the same case is free to respond instead of (or in addition to) the judge that presides over both of the litigants.

===== Other states =====
In Virginia, the Supreme Court has original jurisdiction under the state constitution for mandamus involving the Virginia courts.

Elsewhere, including the Courts of New York, have replaced mandamus (as well as the other prerogative writs) with statutory procedures. In New York, this is known as an Article 78 review after the civil procedure law provision that created the relevant procedure. In still other states, such as Illinois, the state court of last resort has original jurisdiction in mandamus actions.

== See also ==
- Judicial review
- Administrative law
- Habeas corpus
