= Samuel Bold =

English clergyman (1649–1737)

Samuel Bolde or Bold (1649–1737) was an English clergyman and controversialist, a supporter of the arguments of John Locke for religious toleration.

== Life ==
Apparently a native of Chester, he was brought up by William Cook, a nonconformist minister ejected from St. Michael's Church, Chester, in 1662, who died in 1684. Bolde was instituted vicar of Shapwick in Dorset in 1674, but resigned or was ejected in 1688; he was instituted rector of Steeple in the Isle of Purbeck in 1682, and held the living until his death. In 1721 he succeeded to the adjacent parish of Tyneham, united to Steeple by act of parliament.

In 1682, when a brief for the persecuted Huguenots was to be read in church, Bolde preached a sermon against persecution and published it with Awnsham Churchill. With a second edition in the same year, it raised a great outcry; Bolde then published a Plea for Moderation towards Dissenters. He justified his general praise of nonconformists, mentioning amongst others Richard Baxter and Henry Hickman as "shining lights in the church of God". In 1720 Bolde republished the sermon against persecution, adding a short account of his subsequent troubles.

The grand jury at the next assize presented Bold for the sermon and also for the Plea, and he was cited before the court of William Gulston, Bishop of Bristol, where he was accused of having "writ and preached a scandalous libel". Bolde wrote answers to these charges, but he was commanded, on pain of suspension, to preach three recantation sermons. Meanwhile, in the civil courts, a further offence was there alleged against him that he had written a letter befriending a dissenting apothecary in Blandford. For the letter and the two publications he was sentenced to pay three fines, and Bolde was seven weeks in prison before they were paid. After this the death of the bishop and of the promoter in the civil suit freed him from further annoyance.

== Works ==
In 1688 he published A Brief Account of the Rise of the name Protestant, and what Protestantism is. By a professed Enemy to Persecution. In 1690 he engaged in a controversy with Thomas Comber, author of a Scholastical History of the Primitive and General Use of Liturgies in the Christian Church, which Bolde perceived to be written to afford a pretext for persecuting dissent; in 1691 he followed it up with a second tract.

In 1697 he began his tracts in support of Locke's Reasonableness of Christianity and An Essay Concerning Human Understanding. The Reasonableness of Christianity had appeared in 1695, and was attacked by Rev. John Edwards as a Socinian. Locke replied with a Vindication of his essay, to which Edwards answered in Socinianism Unmasked. At this point Bold entered the field, publishing in 1697 a Discourse on the true Knowledge of Christ Jesus, in which he insists, with Locke, that Christ and the apostles considered it enough for a Christian to believe that Jesus was the Christ. To the sermon he appended comments on Locke's essay and Vindication, declaring the essay 'one of the best books that had been published for at least 1,600 years,' and criticising Edwards's tracts. Edwards immediately retorted, and produced a second tract from Bolde with a preface on the meaning of the terms "reason" and "antiquity" as employed in the Socinian controversy. This was in 1697; in 1698 a third tract of Bolde's appeared, answering some Animadversions, published at Oxford. In 1699 he brought out a Consideration of the Objections to the Essay on the Human Understanding. Locke acknowledged Bolde's support in his 'Second Vindication' of his essay; and in 1703 Bold visited Locke at Oates, Essex. He was then meditating the publication of further tracts which Locke dissuaded him from proceeding with. They were, however, published in 1706, and consist of a Discourse concerning the Resurrection of the Same Body and two letters on the necessary immateriality of created thinking substance. The letters discuss and condemn the views expressed in John Broughton's Psychologia and John Norris's Essay towards the Theory of an Ideal World. The discourse deals with Daniel Whitby's arguments against Locke.

In 1717 Bolde's publisher brought out another tract demanding toleration; and in 1724 appeared his last controversial work, Some Thoughts concerning Church Authority. This was occasioned by Benjamin Hoadley's launching of the Bangorian Controversy, with a sermon on the nature of the kingdom of Christ, and his Preservative against the Principles and Practices of Nonjurors, of which Bolde approved. Bolde was answered by several persons, among others by Conyers Place, who condemned him as full of "stupid and affected cant".

In 1693 he published a devotional treatise entitled Christ's Importunity with Sinners to accept of Him, which had been probably already published in 1675. The republication contains an affectionate dedication to Mrs. Mary Cook, the widow of William Cook, his early tutor. In 1696, an epidemic having caused many deaths in his parish, he published eight Meditations on Death written during the leisure bodily distempers have afforded me. In the year before his death Bolde published a Help to Devotion containing a short prayer on every chapter in the New Testament.

== Notes ==
Attribution

This article incorporates text from a publication now in the public domain: Stephen, Leslie, ed. (1886). "Bold, Samuel". Dictionary of National Biography. Vol. 5. London: Smith, Elder & Co.
