= Stanley Gower =

English puritan minister

Stanley Gower (possibly baptised 29 March 1600, died 1660) was a puritan minister in the Church of England. Notably he was one of the Westminster Divines.

In 1613 Gower became a pupil of the notable puritan minister Richard Rothwell who later on prepared Gower for university. In 1621 Gower went up to Trinity College Dublin, where he was elected a Scholar in 1621, and graduated with a Bachelor of Arts in 1625. In 1630 he was appointed the curate of Attercliffe, remaining there until 1635. After a period in Hertfordshire, Gower went to London in 1643 where he took part in the Westminster Assembly until 1649.

His son Humphrey Gower was born in 1638.
