= Hammoon =

Village in Dorset, England

Coordinates: 50.93°N 2.2607°W

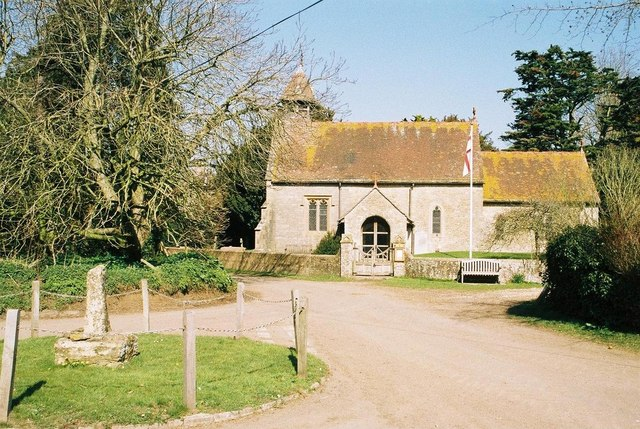
- St. Paul's parish church and cross

- Location within Dorset
- Population: 40
- OS grid reference: ST817145
- Civil parish: Hammoon
- Unitary authority: Dorset
- Ceremonial county: Dorset
- Region: South West
- Country: England
- Sovereign state: United Kingdom
- Post town: Sturminster Newton
- Postcode district: DT10
- Police: Dorset
- Fire: Dorset and Wiltshire
- Ambulance: South Western
- UK Parliament: North Dorset

Hammoon is a small village and civil parish in the English county of Dorset, sited on a river terrace of alluvial silt by the River Stour, about two miles (three kilometres) east of the small town of Sturminster Newton. Its name is derived from the Old English ham, meaning dwelling, and the surname of the Norman lord of the manor ('de Moion' or 'Mohun'). In 2001 the parish had 19 households and a population of 49. In 2013 the estimated population of the parish was 40.

== History ==
In 1086 in the Domesday Book Hammoon was recorded as Hame; it had 15 households, 4 ploughlands and 50 acres (20 hectares) of meadow. It was in the hundred of Newton and the tenant-in-chief was William of Mohun.

The Church of England parish church of St Paul dates probably from the late 12th or early 13th century, though only the north wall of the nave is original. The first building was likely only about 12 feet (3.7 metres) wide, and in the mid 13th century the chancel and south wall of the nave were rebuilt to a slightly larger floorplan; the nave's north wall should also have been rebuilt at this time, but the work was not completed. New windows were installed in the north wall in the 15th century. The nave's west wall was rebuilt in 1885, extending the building westwards. The parish was the first incumbency of the academic and clergyman Humphrey Gower (1638–1711), who later went on to become Master of Jesus College, Cambridge and then St. John's College, Cambridge.

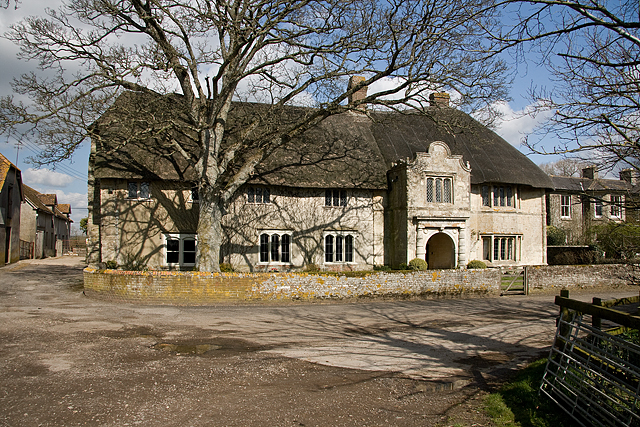
The thatched and mullioned manor house

Near St. Paul's is the thatched and mullioned manor house, which dates from the 16th century and which Sir Frederick Treves described in 1906 as "the most picturesque of its kind". It has an L-shaped plan and has had several changes since first construction, including the addition of a classical porch around 1600. According to Pevsner the building overall has "an air [...] of simple innocence under its thatched roof". It is listed by English Heritage as Grade II*.

The old open fields of the parish were enclosed before 1771.

Hammoon House was built in the 1890s for use as a hunting lodge by the 2nd Viscount Portman of nearby Bryanston. It is an early example of the use of shuttered concrete as a building material, though the exterior was finished to give an appearance of stone. It is now a private residence.

== Geography ==
Hammoon parish covers an area of 690 acres (280 hectares) at an elevation of about 41 to 65 metres (135 to 213 feet). The highest land is on Kimmeridge clay in the south.

Beside the Stour at Hammoon Bridge is an ox-bow lake; it is upstream of the bridge, on the south side of the river. Next to the bridge there is also a gauging station that measures the river flow. It opened in 1968 and is operated by the Environment Agency. The river level typically varies between 0.15 and 2.56 m (6 in and 8 ft 5 in). The highest recorded level is 3.38 m (11 ft), which occurred on 24 December 2013.
