= Winifred Jones (suffragette) =

English suffragette

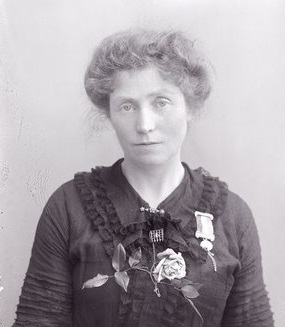
- Winifred Jones, c.1910
- Died: 1955

Winifred Jones (b. unknown, d. 1955) was an English suffragette. Jones was arrested and imprisoned several times in 1909 and 1910 for her participation in suffragette protests and the Women's Social and Political Union's window-smashing campaign. In the 1920s, she contributed to efforts to repair the statue of Elizabeth I in St-Dunstan’s-in-the-West Church, London.

== Early life ==
Jones grew up in Spital Lodge, Chesterfield, Derbyshire. Her father was a solicitor, and she had a sister named Gladys Jones.

== Activism ==
In 1909, the Chancellor of the Exchequer David Lloyd George visited Newcastle to gain public backing for his People's Budget, which aimed to introduce new welfare programs to the United Kingdom.

On Friday, 8 October, Christabel Pankhurst and Constance Lytton met with other suffragettes to finalise their plans for protesting at Lloyd George's public meetings, and to discuss what would happen if they were arrested. Jones, who was young and had not yet been arrested, asked several questions, including whether her tortoiseshell combs would be confiscated by the authorities.

The following day, suffragettes protested at the public meetings, some using militant action. Jones was arrested for damaging windows at the Palace Theatre. This was her first arrest. On her third day of imprisonment, she and fellow suffragette Dorothy Pethick were force fed; following their release, they were rushed to a nursing home.

Jones and the ten other arrested suffragettes wrote an open letter to The Times which included the line:

We appeal to the Government to yield, not to the violence of our protest, but the reasonableness of our demand.

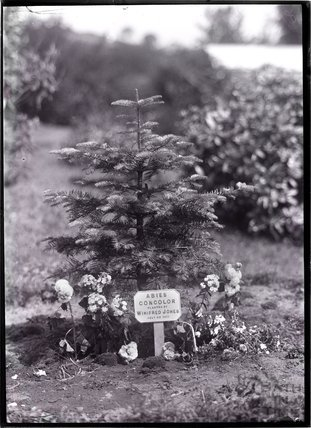
Tree planted by Jones at Eagle House

In 1910, Jones was visited by suffragette Adela Pankhurst when Pankhurst visited Chesterfield.

The same year, Jones was arrested again, alongside Beatrice Saunders, for deliberately damaging No. 10 and 11 Downing Street, the headquarters of the British Government. She was imprisoned for a month.

After her release, Jones spent time at Eagle House, also known as "The Suffragette’s Retreat". She planted an Abies concolor in the house’s garden on 2 July 1911.

Jones is recorded on the National Archives' Roll of Honor of Suffragette Prisoners 1905–1914.

== Later life ==
During the 1920s, Jones lived in Lincoln's Inn, London, with her sister, Gladys, who later became a successful playwright under the name Gwen John. Gladys authored the play Gloriana, about Queen Elizabeth I. The Jones siblings worked alongside suffragette sisters Agnes and Millicent Fawcett to pay for repairs to the statue of Elizabeth I in St-Dunstan’s-in-the-West Church, London.

Jones died in 1955.
