= Richard Lyst =

London grocer and apothecary

Richard Lyst was a London grocer and apothecary who served Cardinal Wolsey and became a priest.

Some letters that Lyst wrote to Thomas Cromwell survive. Lyst became a lay brother of the Observant Friars in Greenwich. He was a supporter of Anne Boleyn, then Marchioness or Marquess of Pembroke, who he describes as the "most onerabyll lady Marcas of Penbroke". The head of the Greenwich house, John Forest, had taken up the opposing cause of Catherine of Aragon. Lyst claimed that Forest was poorly-educated, frequently making grammatical errors in his preaching, breaking "Priscian's head or ear". Cromwell encouraged Lyst and a priest at Greenwich, John Lawrence, as malcontents who could build support for the divorce of Henry VIII. Lyst had first contacted Cromwell as a supporter of John Lawrence in November 1532.

Lyst wrote to Anne Boleyn explaining that he hoped to become a priest and serve as her chaplain. He had been prevented from joining the priesthood because he had once been engaged to marry, but the woman had now died. He begged Anne Boleyn for 40 shillings to pay a debt for clothes bought for his mother.

Lyst made medicinal distilled waters and sent them as a gift to Catherine of Aragon and to Cromwell. He had previously made distilled waters and hippocras for Wolsey.

After leaving the convent at Greenwich, Lyst studied at Clare Hall, Cambridge. He was made rector of the London church St Dunstan-in-the-West in February 1536. The date of his death is unknown.
