= The Rawlett School =

Location
- Comberford Road; Tamworth, Staffordshire, B79 9AA; England
- 52°39′07″N 1°42′12″W

Information
- Type: Academy
- Department for Education URN: 138728 Tables
- Ofsted: Reports
- Chairman Of The Governors: Robert Turner
- Headteacher: Tim Bassett
- Staff: Approx. 100
- Gender: Mixed
- Age: 11 to 16
- Enrolment: 1,000
- Houses: Pankhurst, Attenborough, Hawking, Parks
- Website: http://www.rawlettschool.org/

The Rawlett School is a secondary school with academy status located on the outskirts of Tamworth, a market town in Staffordshire, England. It was previously known as Rawlett Community Sports College and, before that, as Rawlett High School. The school is sponsored by the Academies Enterprise Trust. Rawlett educates around 1,000 students aged 11–16. The headteacher is Rebecca Walker. The catchment includes Tamworth, Fazeley, Mile Oak, Elford, Hopwas, Riverside, Coton Green and Gillway. The school is named after John Rawlet.

== History ==
The school was officially opened in September 1980, by local Councillor Arnold Ward. In 1983, the school merged with the soon to be closed Perrycroft Girls' school and for some of that academic year operated as a split site. By 1985, all 5 year groups were full and the sixth form was becoming established. Four Houses were set up; Grosvenor, Weymouth, Townshend and Wolferstan, named after historically prominent Tamworth families and landowners. In 1999, a fifth House - Peel - was established. Following the loss of the sixth form in 2012 (a Sixth form College was built in Tamworth by Landau Forte Academy) the school reverted to four Houses and Grosvenor ceased to exist. In January 2018, the school was criticised by many (including parents) for the introduction of rules for maximum nail length for students.

== Facilities ==
The school operates the Rawlett IT Academy, which offers Microsoft Office 2003 Specialist courses and exams. It has many sports facilities such as a four-court sports hall, sprung wooden gymnasium, dance studio, meeting rooms, changing rooms, three floodlit county standard tennis courts, floodlit county standard netball court, floodlit synthetic pitch and playing fields. In 2012, the two music rooms were converted to a gymnasium which is free to students during school time and up to 4:30pm when the general public can pay to use it.

== Connexions Card launch ==
The Education secretary Estelle Morris chose Rawlett to launch the Connexions Card, on 14 June 2002. The card was a national initiative to encourage 16 to 19-year-olds to continue in education and training.
