= Peremptory writ of mandamus =

A peremptory writ of mandamus (also peremptory writ of mandate or simply peremptory mandamus) is an absolute and unqualified writ (a formal written command) to the defendant to do the act in question. It is issued when the defendant defaults on, or fails to show sufficient cause in answer to, an alternative mandamus. It is one of the three types of a mandamus.

A more exact definition of a peremptory writ of mandate is "a final order of a court to any governmental body, government official or a lower court to perform an act the court finds is an official duty required by law."

== Distinguishing from other kinds of mandamus ==
A peremptory writ of mandate "is distinguished from an alternative writ of mandate (mandamus), which orders the governmental agency, court or officials to obey the order or show cause at a hearing why it should not."

This may also be distinguished from a continuing mandamus, which asks for an officer or other authority to perform its tasks expeditiously for an unstipulated period of time for preventing miscarriage of justice.

"The usual practice is for anyone desiring such an order is to file a petition for the alternative writ. If the officials do not comply with the order and fail to convince the court that the writ of mandate should not be issued, then the court will issue the peremptory writ. In some emergency situations or when there is no conceivable reason for the government not to follow the law, then the peremptory writ will be issued after a notice of hearing without the alternative writ."

In some jurisdictions or court systems, all types or kinds of writs are bunched together under a single procedural framework. In New York civil practice, any writ is titled a proceeding against (a) body or officer.

== California ==
In California, writs of mandate are usually issued first in the alternative and then, if the filing party prevails, as a peremptory writ. However, in certain cases, the court of appeal or Supreme Court may grant a 'peremptory writ in the first instance', granting the requested relief immediately. Although a peremptory writ in the first instance is issued without a formal response from the real party in interest, the court must first issue a Palma notice to advise the real party in interest that a peremptory writ in the first instance is being considered, and give them an opportunity to submit an informal response.
