= James Pfander =

James E. Pfander
- Occupation: Professor
- Notable work: Principles of Federal Jurisdiction; Constitutional Torts and the War on Terror

James E. Pfander is the Owen L. Coon Professor of Law at the Northwestern Pritzker School of Law. Pfander writes and teaches in the area of federal jurisdiction, particularly as it relates to Article III of the United States Constitution.

Pfander is the author of numerous books and law textbooks, including Principles of Federal Jurisdiction and Constitutional Torts and the War on Terror.
