= Gwen John (playwright) =

British author and playwright

Gwen John (born Gladys Jones; 1878–1953) was a British author and playwright and supporter of women's suffrage.

== Early life ==
Gwen John was born Gladys Jones in 1878, the daughter of a solicitor W.T. Jones. The family lived at Spital Lodge, Chesterfield until about 1910, when her father died and John moved with her mother and older sister, Winifred, to London. All three were sympathetic to the suffrage movement and Winifred Jones was a notable suffragist.

== Career ==
In 1912 John's short play Edge O' Dark was banned by the Lord Chamberlain, who licensed plays for performance, though it was published in full in The English Review. The play was set in an impoverished mining household in Derbyshire; a sexual assault of the female character is implied and the men dominate the woman who lacked her own economic power. There was support for the ban as well as support for John tackling what was a distasteful and contentious subject.

Luck of War was produced by Edith Craig and performed by the Pioneer Players in 1917. It was a social-realist drama portraying the life of a working class woman who remarries when her husband is presumed missing in World War I, but later faces a dilemma when he returns; she is eventually reconciled with him.

Her Plays of Innocence were satirical and Mr Jardyne was described as cynical. The plot attacks commercial theatre management, with the central character being a playwright who dies of starvation after his scripts are returned to him.

Gloriana, which tells the story of Elizabeth I, was produced by Israel Zangwill in London in 1925.

== Plays ==
- Plays (1916) - includes six short plays: Outlaws, Corinna or The Strenuous Life, Stealing the Contract, Edge O' Dark, The Case of Teresa, In the Rector's Study
- Luck of War (1917)
- The Only Daughter (1920)
- The Goblin, the Student and the Huckster (1921) - title later changed to The Goblin
- Plays of Innocence (1925) - includes four short plays: A Tale that is Told, On the Road, Luck of War, A Peakland Wakes
- Gloriana (1925) - also played as The Prince
- Mr Jardyne (1925) - a mystery
- Mere Immortals: three imaginary conversations (1930)
- The Dyer's Hand (1931)

== Other works ==
- Syringa and other verses (1922)
