= Simon Birckbek =

English clergyman and controversialist

Simon Birckbek or Birkbeck (1584–1656) was an English clergyman and controversialist.

== Life ==
He was born at Hornby, Westmoreland. At the age of sixteen he became a student at The Queen's College, Oxford, where from a tabarder he became a Fellow. He proceeded B.A. in 1604, and B.D. in 1616. Entering holy orders about 1607, he became noted as a preacher and disputant, as well as for his knowledge of the Church Fathers and scholastics.

In 1616 he was admitted to the reading of the sentences, and the year after was made vicar of the church of Gilling in Yorkshire, and also of the chapel of Forcet, near Richmond in the same county. He received these preferments through a relative, Humphrey Wharton. During the Civil War, he submitted to the authorities and kept his benefices. He died 14 September 1656, and was buried in Forcet Chapel.

== Works ==
His major work is The Protestant's Evidence, showing that for 1,500 years after Christ divers Guides of God's Church have in sundry Points of Religion taught as the Church of England now doth, London, 1635. The book is in the form of a dialogue between a papist and a Protestant, and was valued by John Selden. A friend having forwarded to Birckbek a copy of his book covered with marginal glosses, which the annotator entitled An Antidote necessary for the reader thereof, an Answer to the Antidotist was appended to a second edition of the Evidence in 1657. The 1657 edition, with this appendix, was published again in 1849 in the supplement to Edmund Gibson's Preservative from Popery’ by the Reformation Society, with John Cumming as editor. Birckbek also wrote a Treatise of the Last Four Things, London, 1655.
