= John Cumming (clergyman) =

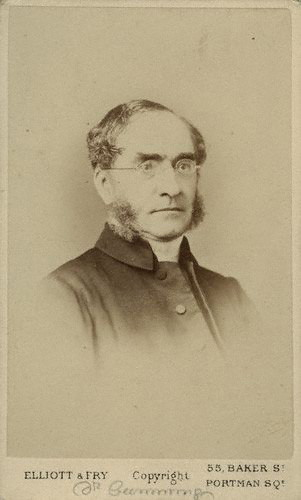
Carte de visite depicting John Cumming, 1860s

John Cumming FRSE (10 November 1807 – 5 July 1881) was a Scottish clergyman and religious author.

== Life ==
He was born in Fintray in Aberdeenshire the eldest son of John Cumming (d.1835) and his wife, Anne Mutch of Foveran. His mother died in 1827 giving birth to his youngest brother, Hercules Cumming. She is buried in St Nicholas Churchyard in Aberdeen.

He attended Aberdeen Grammar School and then studied divinity at King's College in Aberdeen.

In 1832, Cumming was appointed to the Crown Court Church (the Scottish National Church) in Covent Garden, London, a Church of Scotland congregation that catered for Scots living in London. At the time, the congregation had approximately 80 members, but Cumming was able to grow his congregation to around 900, and he regularly preached to congregations of 500–600 on Sundays.

Cumming was a controversial figure in his day, George Eliot being the most prominent figure to criticize him for his anti-Catholicism, obsession with the End Times, and perceived intellectual dishonesty.

In 1853 he was elected a Fellow of the Royal Society of Edinburgh. His proposer was Sir John Archibald Murray.

Cumming retired in 1879. In total, he published approximately 180 books during his lifetime.

He died on 5 July 1881 in Chiswick near London and was buried in Kensal Green Cemetery.

== Family ==
In 1833 he married Elizabeth Nicholson (d.1879), daughter of James Nicholson of London, in a ceremony by Rev Dr Gordon at a house at 5 Annandale Street in Edinburgh. They had several children: Lettice Anne (b.1834); John (b.1835); Fanny (b.1837); Louisa Finch (b.1838); Nicholson (b.1840)' Elizabeth (b.1842); Martin Luther Cumming (1843–1911); James (b.1844); Hugh McNeil (b.1845); Francis (1842–1908); Edward Bishop Elliott Cumming (b.1848 died aged 6 months).

Elizabeth died in 1879.

== Views ==
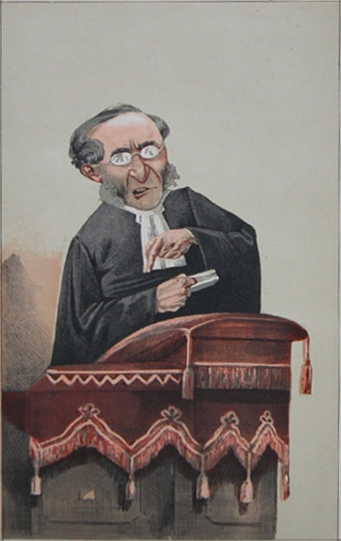
"The End of the World", as depicted by Adriano Cecioni in Vanity Fair, 13 April 1872

Cumming was one of the most virulently anti-Catholic preachers of his day. Several of his books attacked Catholicism, including The Romish Church a Dumb Church (Arthur Hall, 1853) and Ritualism, the Highway to Rome (James Nisbet & Co., 1867). He gave public lectures denouncing Cardinals Nicholas Wiseman and John Henry Newman. The Times also frequently printed letters from Cumming in which he pointed to perceived misdeeds on the part of the Roman Catholic Church.

Cumming also took a deep interest in Christian eschatology, adhering to the Historicist school of Christian eschatology. He believed that historical events such as the French Revolution and the Great Famine of Ireland had fulfilled prophecies contained in the biblical Books of Daniel and Revelation. He preached that the sixth vial of judgment (discussed in Revelation 16) had been poured out in 1820. Cumming therefore taught that Judgment Day would occur some time between 1848 and 1867.

== Works ==
- Speech ... at the annual meeting of the Reformation society, 2d of May, 1839
- A short statement of the origin and nature of the present divisions in the Church of Scotland, 1840.
- A preservative against popery, Volume I, 1848.
- Occasional Discourses. Vol. II. Liberty, Equality, Fraternity, and Other Discourses, 1851
- God in history, or, Facts illustrative of the presence & providence of God in the Affairs of Men, 1852.
- Book of Genesis: Volume 1 of Sabbath Morning Readings on the Old Testament (1864)
- Apocalyptic Sketches: Lectures on the Book of Revelation, 1854.
- Sabbath evening readings on the New Testament, 1854.
- Voices of the Night, 1854.
- Lectures on Romanism: being illustrations and refutations of the errors of Romanism and Tractarianism, 1854.
- Prophetic studies: Lectures on the book of Daniel, 1854.
- Sabbath morning readings on the Old Testament: Book of Exodus, 1854.
- The church before the flood, 1854.
- Benedictions: or, The blessed life, 1854.
- The tent and the altar: or, Sketches from patriarchial life, 1854.
- Foreshadows: Lectures on our Lord's miracles, 1854.
- The comforter, or, Thoughts on the influence of the Holy Spirit, 1854.
- Voices of the dead, 1854
- The end: or, The proximate signs of the close of this dispensation, 1855.
- The daily life: or, Precepts and prescriptions for Christian living, 1855.
- Signs of the times: or, Present, past, and future, 1855.
- Twelve urgent questions: personal, practical, and pointed, 1855.
- Infant salvation: or, all saved that die in infancy, 1855.
- Foreshadows: Lecture's on Our Lord's Parables, 1856.
- The last of the patriarchs: or, Lessons chiefly from the life of Josep, 1856.
- Cumming's minor works, 1856.
- Apocalyptic sketches: Lectures on the seven churches of Asia Minor, 1858.
- Voices of the Day, 1858.
- Sabbath morning readings on the Old Testament. The first and second books of Samuel, 1859.
- Sabbath evening readings on the New Testament. Colossians and Thessalonians, 1859
- The Hammersmith Protestant Discussion :Being an Authenticated Report of the Controversial Discussion Between the Rev. John Cumming and Daniel French on the Differences Between Protestantism and Popery; Held at Hammersmith, during the months of April and May, 1839 London: A. Hall, 1860.
- Sabbath morning readings on the Old Testament. The book of Daniel, 1860.
- The great tribulation: or, Things coming on the earth, Volume 1, 1860.
- Sabbath evening readings on the New Testament. Hebrews, 1861.
- Readings on the prophets. Isaiah, 1862.
- Moses Right and Bishop Colenso Wrong, 1863.
- Great tribulation: or, things coming on the earth, 1863.
- The great consummation: the millennial rest; or, The world as it will be, 1863.
- Driftwood, seaweed, and fallen leaves, Volume II, 1863.
- The Destiny of Nations as Indicated in Prophecy. London: Hurst & Blackett, 1864.
- The great preparation; or Redemption draweth nigh, 1864.
- The last warning cry: with reasons for the hope that is in me, 1867.
- Is Christianity from God? Or, A manual of Christian evidence, 1871.
- "Our Father", a manual of short family prayers, 1871.
- When shall these things be? Or, Signs of the last times, 1878.
