= Edmund Gibson =

British bishop (1669–1748)

The Right Reverend and Right Honourable Edmund Gibson
- Bishop of London
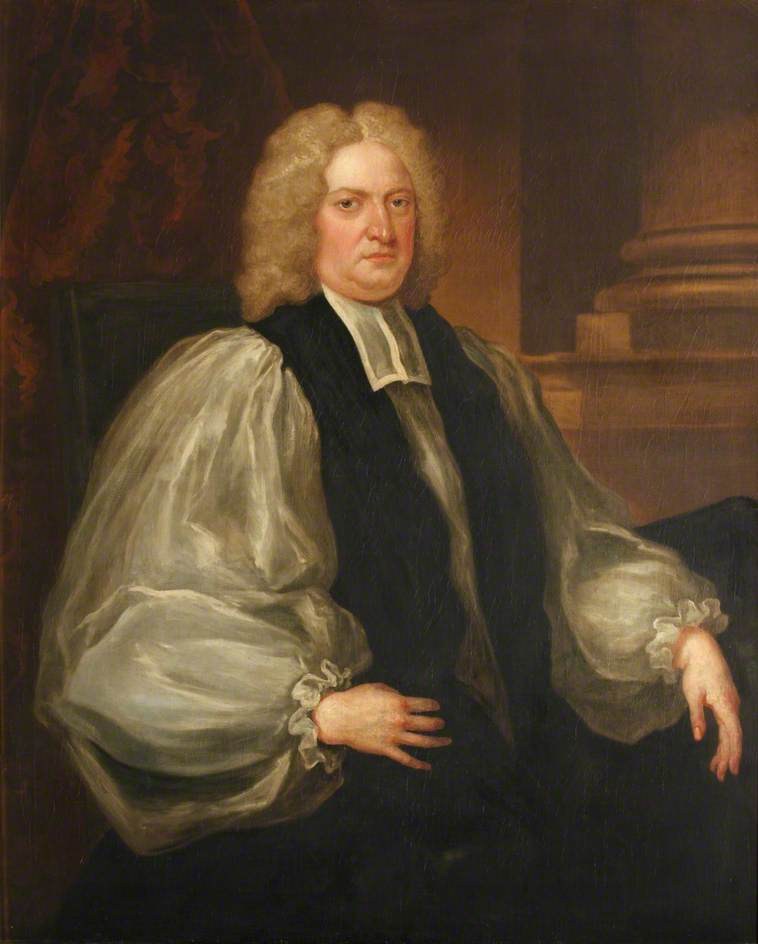
- Edmund Gibson by John Vanderbank
- Church: Church of England
- Diocese: Diocese of London
- Elected: 1723
- Term ended: 1748 (death)
- Predecessor: John Robinson
- Successor: Thomas Sherlock
- Other posts: Bishop of Lincoln; 1716–1720; Archdeacon of Surrey; 1710–1716

Orders
- Consecration: c. 1716

Personal details
- Born: 1669 Bampton, Westmorland
- Died: 6 September 1748 (aged 78–79)
- Buried: All Saints Church, Fulham
- Denomination: Anglican
- Profession: Latin scholar
- Education: Queen's College, Oxford

Edmund Gibson (1669 – 6 September 1748) was an English divine who served as Bishop of Lincoln and Bishop of London, jurist, and antiquary.

== Early life and career ==
Gibson was born in Bampton, Westmorland. In 1686 he entered at Queen's College, Oxford, as a scholar. Shortly after Thomas Tenison's elevation to the see of Canterbury in 1694, Gibson was appointed as his chaplain and librarian; in 1703 he became rector of Lambeth and in 1710 archdeacon of Surrey.

== Episcopal career ==
In 1716 Gibson was presented to the see of Lincoln, from where in 1723 he was translated to London. For twenty-five years he exercised influence, being consulted by Sir Robert Walpole on ecclesiastical affairs.

While a conservative in church politics, and opposed to Methodism, Gibson was no persecutor of nonconformists, and indeed he broke with Walpole on the Quakers' Relief Bill of 1736. He exercised oversight over the morals of his diocese; and his denunciation of the masquerades which were popular at court finally lost him the royal favour. He served as a founding governor of a charity called the Foundling Hospital. His endorsement can be seen as significant since the Foundling Hospital, created by royal charter, was the nation's first non-church initiated institution to target this sort of social ill.

Gibson died in 1748, and is buried at All Saints Church, Fulham, London.

== Works ==
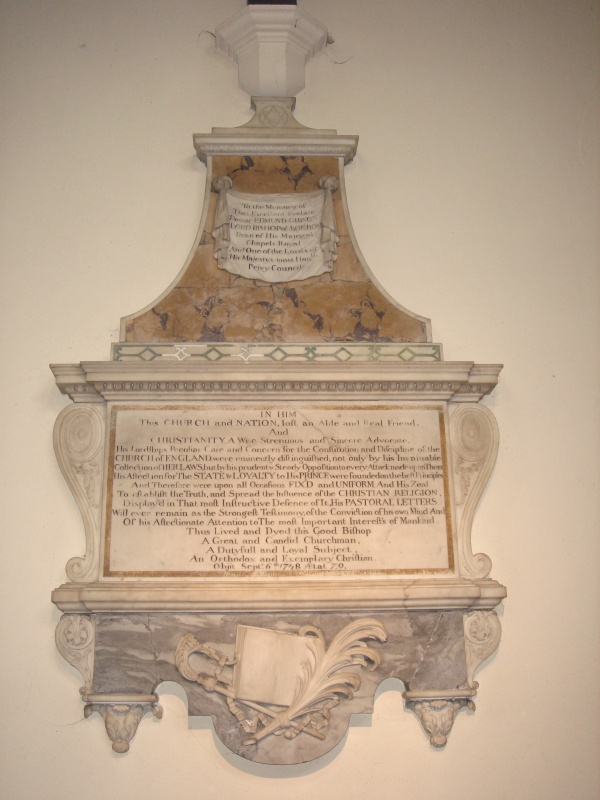
Funerary monument, All Saints, Fulham, London

In 1692 Gibson published an edition of the Saxon Chronicle with a Latin translation, indices and notes, and later a similar translation of the Lindsey Chronicle. These were followed in 1693 by an annotated edition of the De institutione oratoria of Quintilian, and in 1695 by a translation of William Camden's Britannia, with additions and improvements, for which he recruited a team of antiquaries including Edward Lhuyd, William Lloyd and John Smith.

In the discussions which arose during the reigns of William and Anne relative to the rights and privileges of the Convocation, Gibson took a very active part, and in a series of pamphlets warmly argued for the right of the archbishop to continue or prorogue even the lower house of that assembly.

The controversy suggested to him the idea of those researches which resulted in the Codex juris ecclesiastici Anglicani, published in two volumes folio in 1713, a work which discusses more learnedly and comprehensively than any other the legal rights and duties of the English clergy, and the constitution, canons and articles of the English Church. His substantial collection of pamphlets on which his research is based are housed at Lambeth Palace Library (where he began his clerical career as Librarian), as part of the Sion College Collection.

Among the literary efforts of his later years the principal were a series of Pastoral Letters in defence of the gospel revelation, against lukewarmness and enthusiasm, and on various topics of the day; also the Preservative against Popery, in 3 vols. folio (1738), a compilation of numerous controversial writings of eminent Anglican divines, dating chiefly from the period of James II.

A second edition of the Codex juris, revised and improved, with large additions by the author, was published at Oxford in 1761. Besides the works already mentioned, Gibson published a number of Sermons, and other works of a religious and devotional kind. The Vita Thomae Bodleii with the Historia Bibliothecae Bodleianae in the Catalogi librorum manuscriptorum (Oxford, 1697), and the Reliquiae Spelmannianae (Oxford, 1698), are also from his pen.

Church of England titles
| Preceded by William Wake | Bishop of Lincoln; 1716–1723 | Succeeded by Richard Reynolds |
| Preceded by John Robinson | Bishop of London; 1723–1748 | Succeeded by Thomas Sherlock |
