= List of townlands of County Down =

In Ireland, Counties are divided into Civil Parishes and Parishes are further divided into townlands. The following is a list of townlands in County Down, Northern Ireland:

== A ==
Acre McCricket, Aghacullion, Aghandunvarran, Aghavilly, Aghlisnafin, Aghnaleck, Aghnamoira, Aghnatrisk, Aghyoghill, Angus Rock, Annacloy, Annadorn, Annaghanoon, Annaghbane, Annaghmakeonan, Annahunshigo, Ardaghy, Ardarragh, Ardbrin, Ardgeehan, Ardglass, Ardigon, Ardilea, Ardkeen, Ardkeeragh, Ardmeen, Ardminnan, Ardquin, Ardtanagh, Ardtole, Attical, Audley's Acre, Audleystown, Aughintober, Aughnacaven, Aughnacloy, Aughnadarragh, Aughnadrumman, Aughnafosker, Aughnagon, Aughnahoory, Aughnaloopy, Aughnaskeagh, Aughnavallog, Aughrim

== B ==
=== Backaderry - Balloonigan ===
Backaderry, Backnamullagh, Ballaghanery, Ballaghanery Upper, Ballaghbeg, Balleevy, Balleny, County Down, Balliggan, Ballinarry, Ballincurry, Ballincurry Upper, Ballindoalty, Ballindoalty Upper, Ballinlare, Ballinran, Ballinran Upper, Ballintaggart, Ballintine, Ballintlieve, Ballintogher, Ballintur, Ballintur Upper, Balloo, Balloo Lower, Ballooly, Balloolymore, Balloonigan

=== Ballyadam - Ballyewry ===
Ballyadam, Ballyagherty, Ballyaghlis, Ballyagholy, Ballyalgan, Ballyalicock, Ballyalloly, Ballyaltikilligan, Ballyalton (Newtownards South), Ballyalton (Raholp), Ballyardel, Ballyatwood, Ballyaughian, Ballybannan, Ballybarnes, Ballybeen, Ballybeg, Ballyblack, Ballyblack Little, Ballyblaugh, Ballyboghilbo, Ballyboley, Ballybranigan, Ballybrannagh Lower, Ballybrannagh Upper, Ballybredagh, Ballybrick, Ballybryan, Ballybunden and Kilmood, Ballybuttle, Ballycam, Ballycanal, Ballycarn, Ballycarngannon, Ballycastle, Ballyclander Lower, Ballyclander Upper, Ballycloughan, Ballycopeland, Ballycoshone Lower, Ballycoshone Upper, Ballycowan, Ballycran Beg, Ballycran More, Ballycreelly, Ballycreen, Ballycroghan, Ballycross, Ballycrune, Ballycruttle, Ballycullen, Ballyculter Lower, Ballyculter Upper, Ballycultra, Ballydargan, Ballydavey, Ballydesland, Ballydollaghan, Ballydonety, Ballydonnell, Ballydoo, Ballydoonan, Ballydorn, Ballydown, Ballydrain, Ballydrumman, Ballydugan, Ballydulany, Ballydyan, Ballyedmond (townland), Ballyedmond Upper, Ballyedock Lower, Ballyedock Upper, Ballyedock or Carrstown, Ballyesborough, Ballyewry

=== Ballyferis - Ballylucas ===
Ballyferis, Ballyfinragh, Ballyfotherly, Ballyfounder, Ballyfrench, Ballyfrenis, Ballygalget, Ballygallum, Ballygally, Ballygarvan, Ballygarvigan, Ballygeegan, Ballygelagh, Ballygilbert, Ballyginny, Ballyglighorn, Ballygorian Beg, Ballygorian More, Ballygoskin, Ballygowan, Ballygowan (Aghaderg), Ballygowan (Drumbeg), Ballygowan (Kilkeel), Ballygowan (Killinchy), Ballygowan (Moira), Ballygraffan, Ballygrainey, Ballygrangee, Ballygrot, Ballygunaghan, Ballyhackamore, Ballyhafry, Ballyhaft, Ballyhalbert, Ballyhanwood, Ballyharry, Ballyhaskin, Ballyhay, Ballyhemlin, Ballyhenny, Ballyhenry, Ballyhenry Island, Ballyhenry Major, Ballyhenry Minor, Ballyherly, Ballyholland Lower, Ballyholland Upper, Ballyholme, Ballyhomra, Ballyhornan, Ballyhosset, Ballyhosset Milltown, Ballykeel, Ballykeel Artifinny, Ballykeel Edenagonnell, Ballykeel Lougherne, Ballykelly, Ballykilbeg, Ballykillare, Ballykine, Ballykine Lower, Ballykine Upper, Ballykinler Lower, Ballykinler Middle, Ballykinler Upper, Ballyknock, Ballyknockan, Ballyleidy, Ballylenagh, Ballylenaghan, Ballyleny, Ballylesson, Ballylig, Ballylimp, Ballylintagh, Ballylisbredan, Ballylone Big, Ballylone Little, Ballylough, Ballyloughan, Ballyloughlin, Ballylucas

=== Ballymacanallen - Ballynoe ===
Ballymacanallen, Ballymacanally, Ballymacaramery, Ballymacarrett, Ballymacaratty Beg, Ballymacaratty More, Ballymacarn North, Ballymacarn South, Ballymacarron, Ballymacashen, Ballymacateer, Ballymacbredan, Ballymacbrennan, Ballimachoris, Ballymackilreiny, Ballymacmaine, Ballymacnamee, Ballymaconaghy, Ballymaconnell, Ballymacormick, Ballymacreelly, Ballymacromwell, Ballymacruise, Ballymadeerfy, Ballymaganlis, Ballymagaraghan, Ballymagart, Ballymagaughey, Ballymagee, Ballymageogh, Ballymaghan, Ballymaghery, Ballymagin, Ballymaginaghy, Ballymaglaff, Ballymaglave North, Ballymaglave South, Ballymagreehan, Ballymakeonan, Ballymalady, Ballymarter, Ballymartin, Ballymenagh, Ballyminetragh, Ballyministragh, Ballyminnish, Ballymiscaw, Ballymisert, Ballymoney, Ballymorran, Ballymote Lower, Ballymote Middle, Ballymote Upper, Ballymullan, Ballymurphy (Annahilt), Ballymurphy (Ardquin), Ballymurphy (Greyabbey), Ballymurry, Ballynabragget, Ballynacraig, Ballynadrone, Ballynafern, Ballynafoy (Annaclone), Ballynafoy (Knockbreda), Ballynagallagh, Ballynagappoge, Ballynagarrick, Ballynagross, Ballynagross Lower, Ballynagross Upper, Ballynahatten, Ballynahatty, Ballynahinch, Ballynamagna, Ballynanny (Annaclone), Ballynanny (Clonduff), Ballynaris, Ballynaskeagh, Ballynavally, Ballyneddan, Ballyneddan Upper, Ballynester, Ballynewport, Ballynichol, Ballynoe

=== Ballyobegan - Ballyworfy ===
Ballyobegan, Ballyoran, Ballyorgan, Ballyphilip, Ballyplunt, Ballyquintin, Ballyrainey, Ballyrawer, Ballyreagh, Ballyree, Ballyregan, Ballyrenan, Ballyrickard, Ballyridley, Ballyrobert, Ballyrogan, Ballyrogan or Mourne, Ballyrolly, Ballyroney, Ballyrush, Ballyrushboy, Ballyrusley, Ballyrussell, Ballysallagh, Ballysallagh Major, Ballysallagh Minor, Ballysheil, Ballyskeagh, Ballyskeagh High, Ballyskeagh Lower, Ballyspurge, Ballystockart, Ballystokes, Ballystrew, Ballysugagh, Ballytrim, Ballytrustan, Ballyurnanellan, Ballyvally, Ballyvange, Ballyvarley, Ballyvarnet, Ballyvaston, Ballyveagh Beg, Ballyveagh Beg Upper, Ballyveagh More, Ballyveagh More Upper, Ballyvester, Ballyvicknacally, Ballyviggis, Ballywaddan, Ballywallon, Ballywalter, Ballyward, Ballywarren, Ballywatticock, Ballyweely, Ballywhiskin, Ballywhite, Ballywhollart, Ballywierd, Ballywilliam, Ballywillin, Ballywillwill, Ballywoodan, Ballyworfy

=== Bangor Bog - Buskhill ===
Bangor Bog, Banoge, Barnamaghery, Barnboy, Barnmeen, Bavan, Beardy Rocks, Begny, Benagh, Benagh Lower, Benagh Upper, Benraw, Bessy's Island, Big Gull Rock, Bird Island, Bishops Court, Black Abbey, Black Island, Black Islands, Black Rock, Blaris, Bleary, Bonecastle, Bootown, Boretree Island East, Boretree Island West, Boretree Rock North, Bottier, Bovennett, Brackenagh East, Brackenagh East Upper, Brackenagh West, Brackenagh West Upper, Bradock Island, Braniel, Breda, Bresagh, Brickland, Bright, Broaghclogh or Murvaclogher, Broom Quarter, Burial Island, Burren, Burrenbane, Burrenreagh, Buskhill

== C ==
Cabra, Cabragh, Cahard, Calf Island, Cappagh, Carcullion, Cardy, Cargabane, Cargacreevy, Cargacroy, Cargagh, Cargygray, Carmeen, Carnacally, Carnacavill, Carnalbanagh West, Carnamuck, Carnany, Carnasure, Carnbane, Carnew, Carney Hill, Carnreagh, Carrickcrossan, Carrickdrumman, Carrickinab, Carrickmacstay, Carrickmaddyroe, Carrickmannon, Carricknadarriff, Carricknaveagh, Carrickrovaddy, Carrigenagh Upper, Carrigullian, Carrintaggart, Carr, Carrogs, Carrowbaghran, Carrowbane, Carrowcarlin, Carrowdressex, Carrownacaw, Carrowreagh, Carrowvanny, Carrstown or Ballyedock, Carryduff, Carryreagh, Carsonstown, Caskum, Castleaverry, Castlebeg, Castleboy, Castle Espie, Castle Island, Castlemahon, Castlenavan, Castlereagh, Castleskreen, Castlevennon, Castleward, Castlewellan, Cattogs, Cavan, Chanderies Islands, Chapel Island, Cherryvalley, Church Ballee, Church Quarter, Churn Rock, Clanmaghery, Clanvaraghan, Claragh, Clare, Clarkill, Clay (Annaclone), Clay (Killyleagh), Cleomack, Clintagh (Annahilt), Clogher, Cloghram, Cloghskelt, Cloghy, Clonachullion, Clonallan Glebe, Clonta Fleece, Clontaghnaglar, Clontanagullion, Clontonakelly, Clough, Cluntagh (Killyleagh), Cock Mountain, Commonreagh, Commons, Commons of Clanmaghery, Conlig, Conly Island, Cookstown, Coolnacran, Coolsallagh, Coney Island, Coniamstown, Coose, Copeland Island, Corbally, Corbet, Corcreaghan, Corcreeny, Corgary, Cornreany, Corporation, Corrog, Cotton, Craigaroddan, Craigarusky, Craigavad, Craigaveagh Rock, Craigboy, Craignasasonagh, Craigogantlet, Cranfield, Creeghduff, Creevy, Creevy (Drumbo), Creevyargon, Creevybeg, Creevycarnonan, Creevyloughgare, Creevytenant, Cregagh Croan, Crolly's Quarter, Cronstown, Cross, Crossan, Crossgar, Cross Island, Crossnacreevy, Crossnamuckley, Culcavy, Cullintraw, Cullion, Cumber, Cumran, Cunningburn

== D ==
Darragh Island, Dead Mans Island, Deehommed, Demesne, Demesne of Down, Derry, Derryboy, Derrycraw, Derrydrummock, Derrydrummult, Derrylough, Derryneill, Derryoge, Dillin, Dodd's Island, Donaghcloney, Donaghaguy, Dooey, Dooghary, Dooglen, Dree, Drennan, Drin, Dromara, Dromore, Dromorebrague, Drumaconnell East, Drumadoney, Drumadonnell, Drumahoe, Drumaghadone, Drumaghlis, Drumaknockan, Drumalig, Drumanaghan or Drumulcaw, Drumanakelly, Drumanaquoile, Drumaness, Drumantine, Drumaran, Drumardan, Drumardan Quarter, Drumaroad, Drumatihugh, Drumawhy, Drumbane, Drumbeg, Drumbo, Drumbonniff, Drumbroneth, Drumcaw, Drumcro, Drumcro and Drumo, Drumdreenagh, Drumee, Drumena, Drumfad, Drumgath, Drumgavlin, Drumgiven, Drumgooland, Drumgreenagh, Drumhirk, Drumhorc, Drumindoney, Drumkeeragh, Drumlee, Drumlin, Drumlough, Hillsborough, Drumlough, Rathfriland, Drummanlane, Drummanmore, Drummiller (Aghaderg), Drummiller (Donaghmore), Drummiller (Dromore), Drummiller (Tullylish), Drummond Island, Drumnabreeze, Drumnaconagher, Drumnaferry, Drumnagally, Drumnahare, Drumnascamph, Drumnavaddy, Drumneth, Drumo and Drumcro, Drumra, Drumreagh, Drumreagh Upper, Drumsallagh, Drumsesk, Drumskee, Drumsnade, Drumulcaw or Drumanaghan, Duck Rock, Dunbeg Lower, Dundrine, Dundrinne, Dundrum, Duneight, Dunevly, Dunlady, Dunmore, Dunnaman, Dunnanelly, Dunnanew, Dunnaval, Dunnyneill Islands, Dunover, Dunsfort, Dunsy Island, Dunturk

== E ==
Echlinville, Edenagarry, Edenballycoggill, Edendarriff, Edenderry, Edenderry (Aghaderg), Edenderry (Seapatrick), Edenmore, Edenordinary, Edenslate, Edenticullo, Edentiroory, Edentrillick, Edentrumly, Ednego, Enagh, Erenagh

== F ==
Farranfad, Fedany, Feney, Ferryquarter, Finnabrogue, Finnis, Fish Quarter, Fofannybane

== G ==
Gabbock Island, Galwally, Ganaway, Gargarry, Gartross, Garvaghy, Gibb's Island, Gilnahirk, Glaskerbeg East, Glaskerbeg West, Glaskermore, Glasdrumman, Glasdrumman Upper, Glass Moss, Glastry, Glebe (Annahilt), Glebe (Donaghmore), Glebe (Kilclief), Glebe (Rathmullan), Glenloughan (Aghaderg), Glenloughan (Kilkeel), Glovet, Gordonall, Gores Island, Gortgrib, Gortnamony, Goward, Grallaghgreenan, Granagh, Grange, Grangee, Grangewalls, Grangicam, Gransha, Great Minnis's Island, Greenan (Aghaderg), Greenan (Dromore), Greenan (Newry), Greencastle, Greengraves, Green Island, Greenisland Rock, Greenoge, Gregorlough, Grey Abbey, Groomsport, Growell, Guineways, Gull Rock, Guiness, Guns Island

== H ==
Hare Island, Hen Island, Herdstown, Hillhall, Hillsborough, Hogstown, Hollymount, Holywood, Horse Island

== I ==
Imdel, Inch, Islandacorr, Islandbane, Islandderry, Island Henry, Islandhill, Islandmore, Islandmoyle, Island Taggart, Isle McCricket, Isle O'Valla

== J ==
Jackdaw Island, Jocks Island, Jordans Acre, Jordans Crew

== K ==
Kearney, Keentagh, Kernan, Kilbride, Kilbright, Kilbroney, Kilclief, Kildares Crew, Kilfeaghan, Kilfullert, Kilkeel, Kilkinamurry, Killaghy, Killaney, Killard Lower, Killarn, Killavees, Killeen, Killinakin, Killinchy, Killinchy in the Woods, Killinure, Killough, Killowen Mountains, Killydressy, Killynether, Killysavan, Killysorrell, Killyvolgan, Kilmacrew, Kilminioge, Kilmood and Ballybunden, Kilmore, Kilnatierny, Kilpike, Kiltarriff, Kinallen, Kinghill, Kircassock, Kircubbin, Kirkistown, Kirkland and Toy, Knock, Knockbarragh, Knockbreckan, Knockgorm, Knockinelder, Knocknagoney, Knocknagore, Knocknanarny, Knocksticken

== L ==
Lackan, Lagnagoppoge, Lappoges, Large Park, Largymore, Launches Little, Legacurry, Legamaddy, Legananny, Leggygowan, Legmore, Leitrim, Leitrim Upper, Lenaderg, Lenish, Leode, Lessans, Letalian, Levallyclanone, Levallyreagh, Leveroge, Light House Island, Linden's Lump, Lisadian, Lisbane, Lisbarnet, Lisboy, Lisdalgan, Lisdoonan, Lisinaw, Lisleen, Lismaine, Lismore, Lisnabrague, Lisnabreeny Lisnacree, Lisnacreevy, Lisnacroppan, Lisnafiffy, Lisnagade, Lisnagonnell, Lisnamaul, Lisnamore, Lisnamulligan, Lisnaree, Lisnasallagh, Lisnashanker, Lisnasharragh, Lisnasliggan, Lisnastrean, Lisnasure, Lisnatierny, Lisnatrunk, Lisnavaghrog, Lisnaward, Lisnisk, Lisnode, Lisnoe, Lisoid, Lisowen, Lissara, Lissize, Listooder, Listullycurran, Little Minnis's Island, Long Island, Longlands, Loughadian, Loughans, Loughdoo, Loughkeelan, Loughmoney, Loughriscouse, Lurgananare, Lurganbane, Lurgancahone, Lurgancanty, Lurganconray, Lurganreagh, Lurgantamry, Lurganville, Lythe Rock

== M ==
Maddydrumbrist, Magherabeg, Magheraconluce, Magheracranmoney, Magheradartin, Magheradrool, Magherageery, Magherahinch, Magheraknock, Magheralagan, Magherally, Magheralone, Magheramayo, Magheramurphy, Magherana, Magherasaul, Magherascouse, Magheratimpany, Maghereagh, Maghery, Mahee Island, Marlfield, Marl Island, Marshallstown, Mayo, Maze, Mealough, Meenan, Mew Island, Midge, Milecross, Miller Hill, Millquarter Milltown Minnis's Island & Little, Moneycarragh, Moneydorragh Beg, Moneydorragh More Upper, Moneygore, Moneylane, Moneymore, Moneynabane, Moneyreagh, Moneyscalp, Moneyslane, Monlough, Monree, Mount Alexander, Mount Stewart, Mourne Mountains East, Mourne Mountains Middle, Mourne Mountains West, Mourne Park or Ballyrogan, Moyad, Moyallen, Moybrick Lower, Moybrick Upper, Moydalgan, Moygannon, Moymore, Mullabrack, Mullafernaghan, Mullagh, Mullaghdrin, Mullaghmore, Mullartown, Multihogy, Murlough Lower, Murlough Upper, Murvaclogher or Broaghclogh

== N ==
Naghan, Narrow Water, Near Craiglee Rock, Newcastle, Newtown, Newtown Upper, Nunsquarter

== O ==
Ogilby Island, Orlock, Ouley, O'Valla & Isle

== P ==
Parson Hall, Parton Island, Pawle Island, Peggys Island, Phersons Island, Pig Island, Portavoe, Portavogie, Portloughan, Pound Island, Priest Town

== Q ==
Quarter Cormick, Quarterland, Quilly, Quoile

== R ==
Rademan, Raffrey, Raholp, Rainey Island, Raleagh, Ramharry Rock, Ratallagh, Rathcunningham, Rathgorman, Rathmullan Lower, Ravara, Ravernet, Reagh Island, Reillys Trench, Ringawaddy, Ringbane, Ringcreevy, Ringdufferin, Ringfad, Ringhaddy, Ringmackilroy, Ringneill, Ringolish, Ringreagh, Risk, Roddans, Roe Island, Rolly Island, Rosemount, Ross, Rossconor, Rossglass, Rosstrevor, Rosstrevor Mountains, Round Island, Rough Island, Rowreagh, Russell's Quarter, Russell's Quarter South

== S ==
Saintfield Parks, Saint John's Point, Salt Island, Salt Marsh Islands, Salt Rock, Sandy Island, Saul, Saul Quarter, Scady Rocks, Scarva, Scrabo, Scrib, Seafin, Seaforde Demesne, Seavaghan, Shamrock Island, Shankill, Shanrod, Shark Island, Sheelah's Island, Sheepland Beg, Shones, Shooters Island, Simmy Island, Skeagh, Sketrick Island, Skillyscolban, Slanes, Slatady, Slievenaboley, Slievenagriddle, Slievenalargy, Slievenisky, Sloanstown, Small Park, South Island, South Sheelah's Island, Spittle Ballee, Spittle Quarter, Springvale, Stang, Stinking Rock, Stirk Isle, Strand, Strangford Lower, Struell, Swan Island, Swan Rock

== T ==
Taghnabrick, Tamary, Tamnaharry, Tamnyveagh, Tannaghmore, Tara, Taughblane, Taughlummy, Taughrane, Teconnaught, Temple, Templepatrick, The Devils Jacks, The Point Park, Thomastown, Thompson's Island, Tievenadarragh, Tieveshilly, Tirfergus, Tirkelly, Tirygory, Tobercorran, Tobermoney, Tollumgrange Lower, Tollymore, Tollymore Park, Tonaghmore, Town Parks, Town Parks of Donaghadee, Toy and Kirkland, Trasnagh Island, Trooperfield, Tullindoney, Tullinespick, Tullinisky, Tullintanvally, Tullyboard, Tullycarn, Tullycarnet, Tullyconnaught, Tullycross, Tullyear, Tullygarvan, Tullyherron, Tullyhubbert, Tullylish, Tullyloob, Tullymally, Tullynacrew, Tullynagardy, Tullynakill, Tullyorier, Tullytramon, Tullywasnacunagh, Tyrella North

== W ==
Walshestown, Watson's Island, Whigamstown, Whitechurch, Whitehills, Wood Island

== See also ==
- List of civil parishes of County Down
