= Ballysheil =

Ballysheil may refer to:

- Ballysheil, County Down, a townland in County Down, Northern Ireland
- Ballysheil, County Offaly, a townland in County Offaly, Ireland
- Ballysheil, County Armagh, a townland in County Armagh, Northern Ireland
- Ballysheil Beg, a townland in County Armagh, Northern Ireland
- Ballysheil More, a townland in County Armagh, Northern Ireland
