= Donaghmore, County Down =

Civil parish in County Down, Northern Ireland

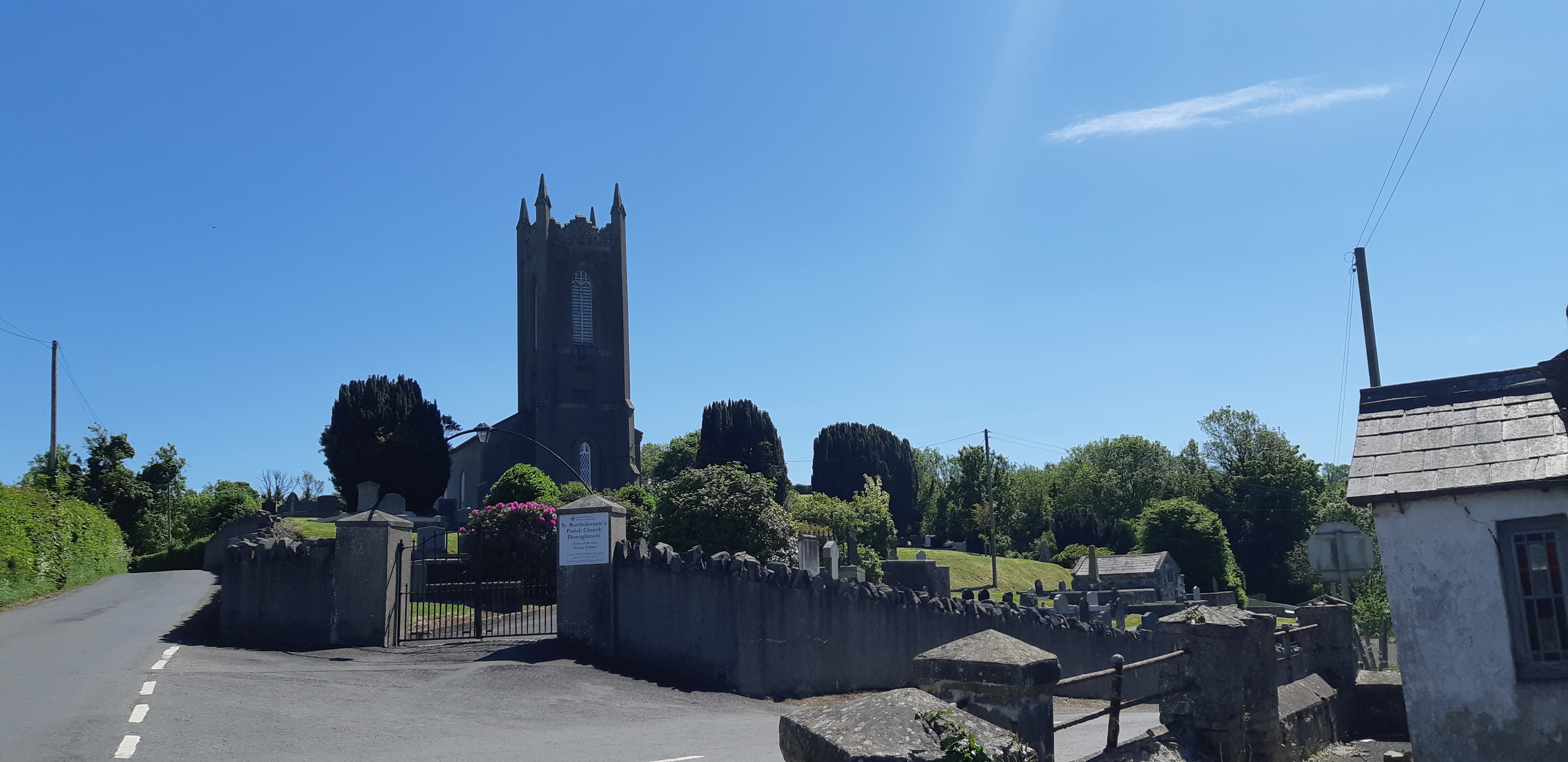
St Bartholomew's Church in Donaghmore townland

Donaghmore is a civil parish in County Down, Northern Ireland. It is situated mainly in the historic barony of Iveagh Upper, Upper Half, with two townlands in the barony of Iveagh Lower, Upper Half.

== Settlements ==
The townland contains the following villages:

- Lurganare
- Glen (or Glenn)

== Churches ==
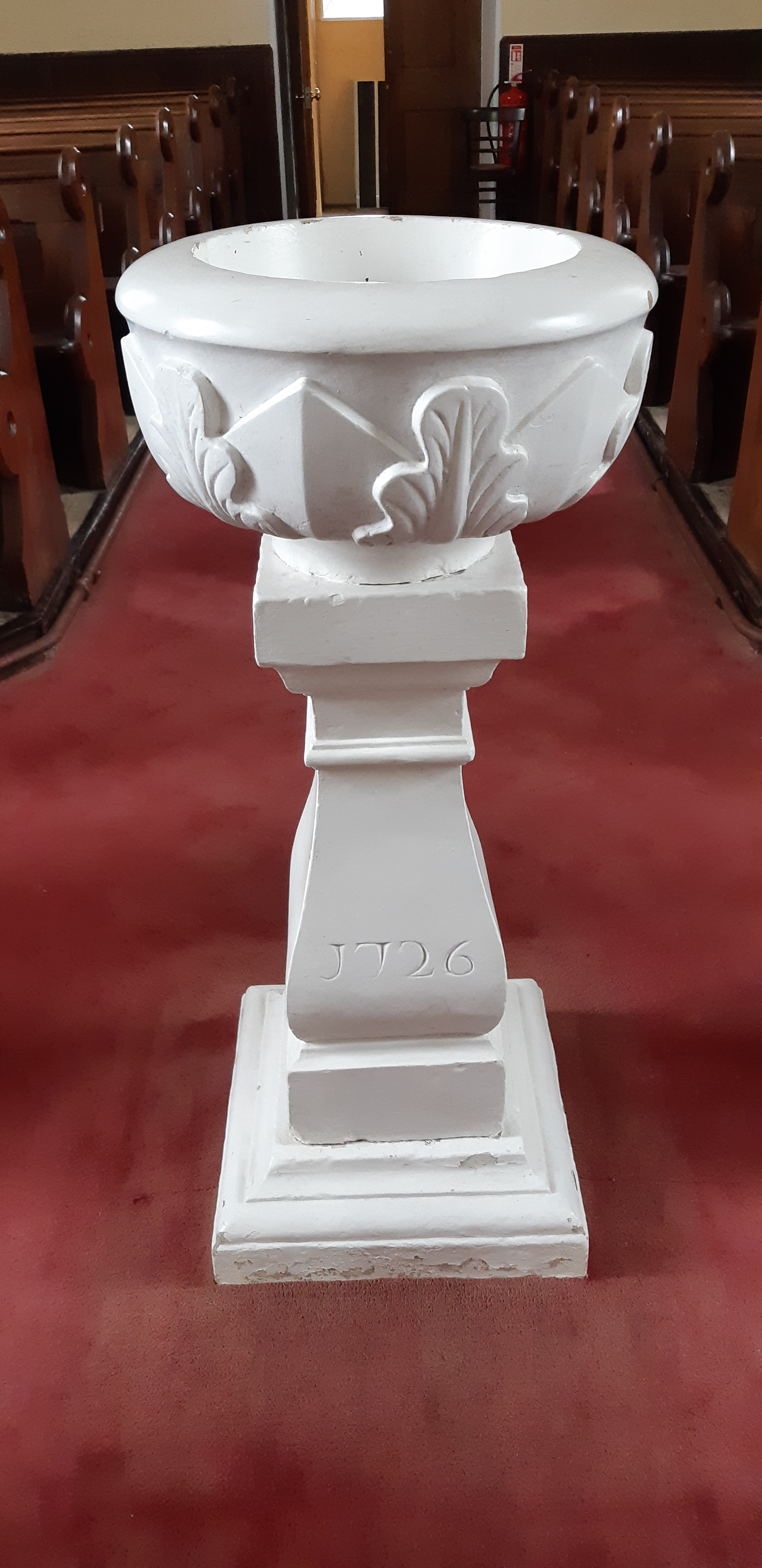
Font of St Bartholomew's Church

St Bartholomew's Church of Ireland occupies the historical site at Donaghmore outside the city of Newry. The church site dates to the times of when St Patrick visited Ireland and the current church building was completed in 1741. There are souterrains (tunnels) at the grounds, which were sealed in the 1930s. The church has a font which is dated 1726 and a historical high cross within its churchyard.

Other churches in the area include:

- Donaghmore Presbyterian Church, Donaghmore, Newry
- Saint John the Evangelist Church, Glenn, Donaghmore, Newry (Roman Catholic) Chapel
- The former Primitive Methodist Church at Donaghmore closed around 1992

== Notable people ==
- Loyalist Robin Jackson, nicknamed "The Jackal" (1948-1998), was born in Donaghmore and is buried in the St. Bartholomew Church of Ireland churchyard.

== Townlands ==
Donaghmore civil parish contains the following townlands:

- Annaghbane
- Ardkeeragh
- Aughintober
- Aughnacaven
- Ballyblaugh
- Ballylough
- Ballymacaratty Beg
- Ballymacaratty More
- Buskhill
- Cargabane
- Carrickrovaddy
- Corgary
- Derrycraw
- Drumantine
- Drummiller
- Glebe
- Killysavan
- Knocknanarny
- Lurganare
- Maddydrumbrist
- Moneymore
- Ringbane
- Ringclare
- Ringolish
- Tullymore
- Tullymurry

== See also ==
- List of civil parishes of County Down
