= Annacloy (Hillsborough) =

Townland in Northern Ireland

Coordinates: 54°28′32″N 6°6′24″W

Annacloy: Irish: Áth na Cloiche
- Location within County Down
- County: County Down
- Country: Northern Ireland
- Sovereign state: United Kingdom
- Postcode district: BT
- Dialling code: 028

Annacloy (from Irish Áth na Cloiche 'ford of the stone') is a townland in County Down, Northern Ireland. It has an area of 192.06 acres (0.778 km^{2}). It is situated in the civil parish of Blaris and the historic barony of Iveagh Lower, Upper Half, located 3 miles south-west of Lisburn. It lies within the Lisburn and Castlereagh City Council.

== See also ==
- List of townlands in County Down
