= Derrylough =

Derrylough may refer to the following places:

- Derrylough, County Clare, a townland of County Clare, Ireland
- Derrylough, County Cork, a townland of the barony of Bear, County Cork, Ireland
- Derrylough, County Down, a townland in County Down, Northern Ireland
- Derrylough, County Kerry, a townland of County Kerry, Ireland
- Derrylough, County Longford, a townland of County Longford, Ireland
