= Annaghbane =

Townland in Northern Ireland

Coordinates: 54°15′53″N 6°16′46″W

Annaghbane: Irish: Eanach Bán
- Location within County Down
- County: County Down
- Country: Northern Ireland
- Sovereign state: United Kingdom
- Postcode district: BT
- Dialling code: 028

Annaghbane (from Irish Eanach Bán 'white bog') is a rural townland in County Down, Northern Ireland. It has an area of 265.63 acres (1.08 km^{2}). It is situated in the civil parish of Donaghmore and the historic barony of Iveagh Upper, Upper Half, located 6 miles south of Banbridge. It lies within the Newry, Mourne and Down District Council.

== See also ==
- List of townlands in County Down
