= Ardbrin =

Ardbrin: Irish: Árd Brain
- County: County Down
- Country: Northern Ireland
- Sovereign state: United Kingdom
- Postcode district: BT32

Ardbrin (from Irish Árd Brain, meaning 'Bran’s height') is a townland of 1,007 acres in County Down, Northern Ireland. It is situated in the civil parish of Annaclone and the historic barony of Iveagh Upper, Upper Half.

It is the largest townland in the parish and contains a cemetery marking the site of the ancient parish church. The townland contains part of the village of Annaclone having a population of around 150 people, the remainder being in the townland of Tullintanvally.

== Archaeology ==
An Iron Age bronze trumpet, known as the 'Ardbrin Horn', was found in bogland at Ardbrin in the 19th century. The horn is 1.42m long and made from riveted and shaped bronze sheets, including 1,094 rivets. It may have been an instrument for display and use on special occasions. It is held in the National Museum of Ireland in Dublin.

== See also ==
- List of townlands in County Down
- List of archaeological sites in County Down
