= Aghnamoira =

Townland in Northern Ireland

Coordinates: 54°7′36″N 6°17′24″W

Aghnamoira: Irish: Achadh na Maolrátha
- Location within County Down
- County: County Down
- Country: Northern Ireland
- Sovereign state: United Kingdom
- Postcode district: BT
- Dialling code: 028

Aghnamoira (from Irish Achadh na Maolrátha 'field of the dismantled earthen fort') is a rural townland in County Down, Northern Ireland. It has an area of 569.63 acres (2.31 km^{2}). It is situated in the civil parish of Clonallan and the historic barony of Iveagh Upper, Upper Half, located 2 miles north-west of Warrenpoint. It lies within the Newry, Mourne and Down District Council.

== See also ==
- List of townlands in County Down
