= Hillsborough, County Down (civil parish) =

Civil parish in County Down, Northern Ireland

Hillsborough is a civil parish in County Down, Northern Ireland. It is situated in the historic barony of Iveagh Lower, Upper Half. It is also a townland of 642 acres.

== Settlements ==
The civil parish contains the following settlements:

- Hillsborough

== Townlands ==
Hillsborough civil parish contains the following townlands:

- Aghandunvarran
- Ballyhomra
- Ballykeel Artifinny
- Ballykeel Edenagonnell
- Ballyworfy
- Cabragh
- Clogher
- Corcreeny
- Drumatihugh
- Edenticullo
- Hillsborough
- Large Park
- Lisadian
- Magheradartin
- Reillys Trench
- Small Park
- Taughblane
- Tullynore

== See also ==
- List of civil parishes of County Down
