= List of islands of County Down =

Ireland has three inhabited islands along with 258 sometime inhabited islands. The following is a list of islands in County Down, Northern Ireland, including tidal islands, tied islands and scaddies:

== A ==
Angus Rock

== B ==
Bird Island (Ardkeen), Bird Island (Downpatrick), Bird Island (Mahee)

== C ==
Cannon Rock, Castle Island (Downpatrick), Castle Island (Ring Haddy), Copeland Island

== D ==
Dodd's Island, Dunsy Island

== G ==
Gibb's Island, Gores Island, Guns/Gunns Island

== H ==
Hare Island

== I ==
Island Taggart, Islandmore

== L ==
Lighthouse Island, Long Island

== M ==
Mahee Island, Mew Island

== P ==
Pawle Island

== R ==
Rainey Island, Reagh Island

== S ==
Salt Island, Simmy Island

== W ==
Watson's Island, Wood Island
