= Aghavilly =

Townland in Northern Ireland

Coordinates: 54°8′14″N 6°14′0″W

Aghavilly: Irish: Achadh Bhile
- Location within County Down
- County: County Down
- Country: Northern Ireland
- Sovereign state: United Kingdom
- Postcode district: BT
- Dialling code: 028

Aghavilly (from Irish Achadh Bhile 'field of the sacred tree') is a rural townland in County Down, Northern Ireland. It has an area of 423.05 acres (1.71 km^{2}). It is situated in the civil parish of Clonallan and the historic barony of Iveagh Upper, Upper Half, located 2 miles north of Warrenpoint. It lies within the Newry City and Down District Council. Aghavilly is also known as Aughavilly.

== See also ==
- List of townlands in County Down
