= Jeremiah Pydocke =

Irish Anglican priest

Jeremiah Pydocke was an Anglican priest in Ireland during the second half of the 17th century.

Pydcocke educated at Trinity College, Dublin. He held incumbencies at Blaris and Lisburn. He was Archdeacon of Down from 4 March 1661 until his death in 1674. The year before his death he was appointed Prebendary of Rasharkin.
