= Aghlisnafin =

Townland in Northern Ireland

Coordinates: 54°17′3″N 5°53′49″W

Aghlisnafin: Irish: Achadh Lios na bhFian
- Location within County Down
- County: County Down
- Country: Northern Ireland
- Sovereign state: United Kingdom
- Postcode district: BT
- Dialling code: 028

Aghlisnafin (from Irish Achadh Lios na bhFian 'field of the ringfort of the warrior bands') is a rural townland in County Down, Northern Ireland. It has an area of 843.82 acres (3.42 km^{2}). It is situated in the civil parish of Kilmegan and the historic barony of Lecale Upper, located 2.3 miles north east of Castlewellan. It lies within the Newry, Mourne and Down District Council. Aghlisnafin is also known as Aughlisnafin.

== See also ==
- List of townlands in County Down
