= Ballynafoy =

Ballynafoy may refer to:

- Ballynafoy (Annaclone), a townland in Iveagh Upper, Upper Half, County Down, Northern Ireland
- Ballynafoy (Knockbreda), a townland in Castlereagh Upper, County Down, Northern Ireland, now known as Ballynafeigh, an area of south Belfast
