= Drumlough =

Drumlough may refer to:

- Drumlough, Hillsborough
- Drumlough, Rathfriland
