= Kilmegan =

Civil parish in County Down, Northern Ireland

Kilmegan is a civil parish in County Down, Northern Ireland. It is situated in the historic baronies of Iveagh Upper, Lower Half, Kinelarty and Lecale Upper.

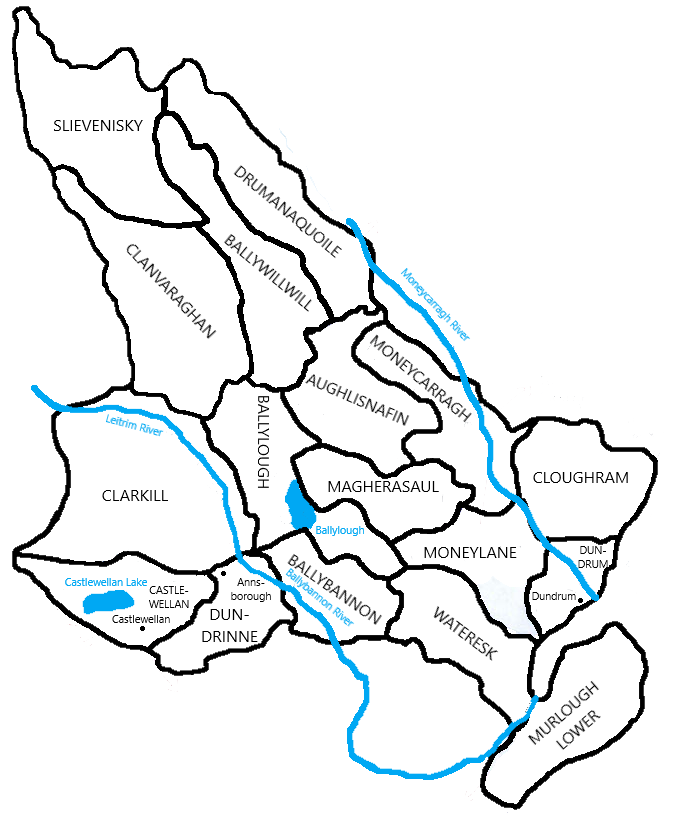
Map of the Kilmegan Parish

== Settlements ==
The civil parish contains the following settlements:

- Annsborough
- Castlewellan
- Dundrum

== Townlands ==
Kilmegan civil parish contains the following townlands:

- Aughlisnafin
- Ballybannan
- Ballylough
- Ballywillwill
- Castlewellan
- Clarkill
- Cloghram
- Clanvaraghan
- Drumanaquoile
- Dundrinne
- Dundrum
- Magherasaul
- Moneycarragh
- Moneylane
- Murlough Lower
- Slievenisky
- Wateresk

== See also ==
- List of civil parishes of County Down
