= Annaclone =

Village in County Down, Northern Ireland

Coordinates: 54.3008°N 6.1958°W

Annaclone: Irish: Eanach Luain
- Location within County Down
- Population: 190 (2021 census)
- County: County Down
- Country: Northern Ireland
- Sovereign state: United Kingdom
- Post town: Banbridge
- Postcode district: BT32
- Dialling code: 028
- Police: Northern Ireland
- Fire: Northern Ireland
- Ambulance: Northern Ireland
- UK Parliament: South Down

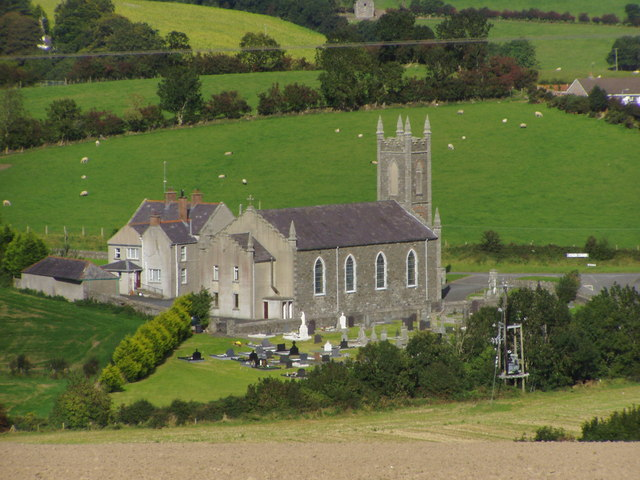
St Colman's Church, Annaclone, in 2007

Annaclone (from Irish Eanach Luain, meaning 'marsh of the haunch-like hill') is a village and civil parish between Rathfriland and Banbridge in south County Down, Northern Ireland, about 7 km south-east of Banbridge. The village is situated in the townlands of Ardbrin and Tullintanvally and both it and the civil parish are located in the historic barony of Iveagh Upper, Upper Half. It had a population of 190 people (85 households) in the 2021 census.

The geography of Annaclone is typical of much of the area around the Mourne Mountains with rolling drumlins and farmland. Nearby Corbet Lough is visited by anglers while the highest point of the parish, locally known as 'the Knock', has views of the Mourne Mountains towards the south and Slieve Croob towards the north east.

== History ==
Several Celtic artefacts were found in a marsh in the Ardbrin area of Annaclone. These finds included a horn known as the 'Ardbrin Horn' which now resides in the National Museum of Ireland, Dublin. Historically, the area belonged to the Magennis clan. The remains of their castle are situated in nearby Rathfriland.

== Sport ==
The local Gaelic Athletic Association (GAA) club, Annaclone GAC, was founded in 1897.

Annaclone has previously played host to a stage of the Circuit of Ireland Rally as well as other cycling events throughout the year.

== People ==
- Patrick Brontë, father of Charlotte Brontë and Emily Brontë, was born in the parish in 1777 and also taught in a school in the parish. As a result, the area of southern Annaclone is known as 'The Brontë Homeland'. Although Patrick Brontë's house is now in ruins, the nearby Brontë Interpretative Centre maintains the link between the family and the area.
- Catherine O'Hare, the first European woman to cross the Canadian Rockies (with her husband Mr. Schubert, and two small children, en route to the Fraser Valley gold rush), was born around 1835 in the townland of Ballybrick in Annaclone.

== Civil parish of Annaclone ==
The civil parish of Annaclone includes the village of Annaclone. Townlands within the civil parish include:

- Ardbrin
- Aughnacloy
- Ballynafern
- Ballynafoy
- Ballynagross
- Ballynanny
- Ballysheil
- Cappagh
- Clay
- Derrylough
- Lisnasliggan
- Tullintanvally

== See also ==
- List of towns and villages in Northern Ireland
- List of civil parishes of County Down
