= Ballynanny (Annaclone) =

Townland in County Down, Northern Ireland

Coordinates: 54°18′41″N 6°13′45″W

Ballynanny: Irish: Bealach an Eanaigh
- Townland
- Location within County Down
- County: County Down
- Country: Northern Ireland
- Sovereign state: United Kingdom
- Police: Northern Ireland
- Fire: Northern Ireland
- Ambulance: Northern Ireland

Ballynanny (Annaclone) (from Irish Bealach an Eanaigh, meaning 'routeway of the marsh') is a townland of 538 acres in County Down, Northern Ireland. It is situated in the civil parish of Annaclone and the historic barony of Iveagh Upper, Upper Half.

There is a townland of the same name in the civil parish of Clonduff in the historic barony of Iveagh Upper, Lower Half.
