= Lough Island Reavy =

- Location within County Down
- Location: Kilcoo, County Down, Northern Ireland
- Coordinates: 54°14′20″N 6°0′50″W
- Type: reservoir
- Basin countries: United Kingdom

Lough Island Reavy is a small man-made lough in Kilcoo, County Down, Northern Ireland. It is a fishing spot, which was controlled by the Kilcoo Angling Club. The lake contains pike and perch, as well as small numbers of wild brown trout and eels.

== Gallery ==
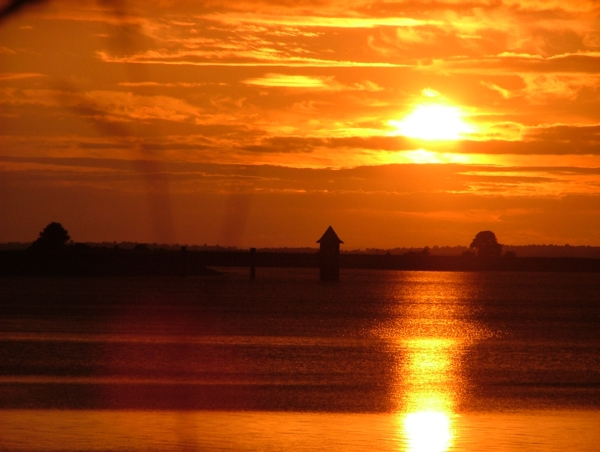
Sunset over the Lough

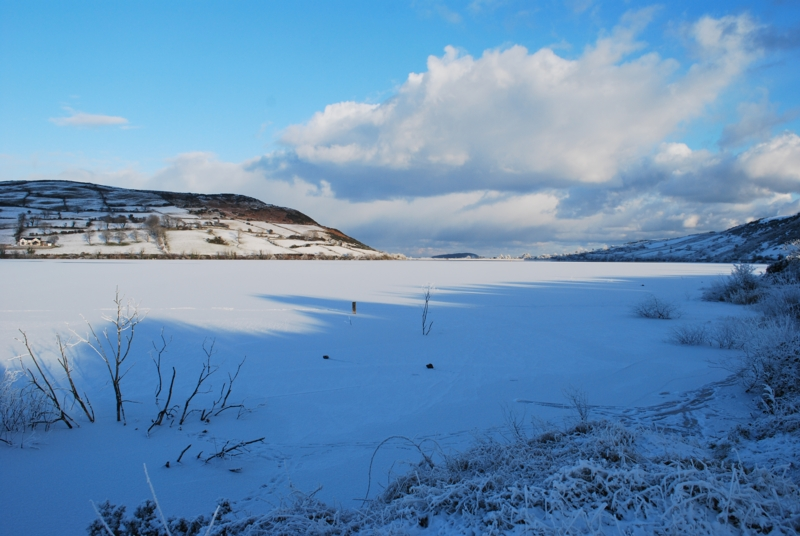
Lough Island Reavy was frozen over in January 2010

== See also ==
- List of loughs in Ireland
