= Ballysheil, County Down =

Coordinates: 54°18′06″N 6°09′33″W

Ballysheil: Irish: Baile Uí Shiail
- Townland
- Location within County Down
- County: County Down
- Country: Northern Ireland
- Sovereign state: United Kingdom
- Police: Northern Ireland
- Fire: Northern Ireland
- Ambulance: Northern Ireland

Ballysheil (from Irish Baile Uí Shiail, meaning 'O'Sheil's townland') is a townland of 385 acres in County Down, Northern Ireland. It is situated in the civil parish of Annaclone and the historic barony of Iveagh Upper, Upper Half.

The area was church land in the 17th century, held along with Aughnacloy by the O'Sheil (Ó Siadhail) family. Although they forfeited the lands in 1658, the townland name continued to include their surname.
