= Ballynafern =

Coordinates: 54°17′19″N 6°12′21″W

Ballynafern: Irish: Baile na Fearna
- Townland
- Location within County Down
- County: County Down
- Country: Northern Ireland
- Sovereign state: United Kingdom
- Postcode district: BT32

Ballynafern (from Irish Baile na Fearna, meaning 'townland of the alder') is a townland of 778 acres in County Down, Northern Ireland. It is situated in the civil parish of Annaclone and the historic barony of Iveagh Upper, Upper Half.
