= Ballybannan =

Townland in County Down, Northern Ireland

Coordinates: 54°15′27″N 5°54′16″W

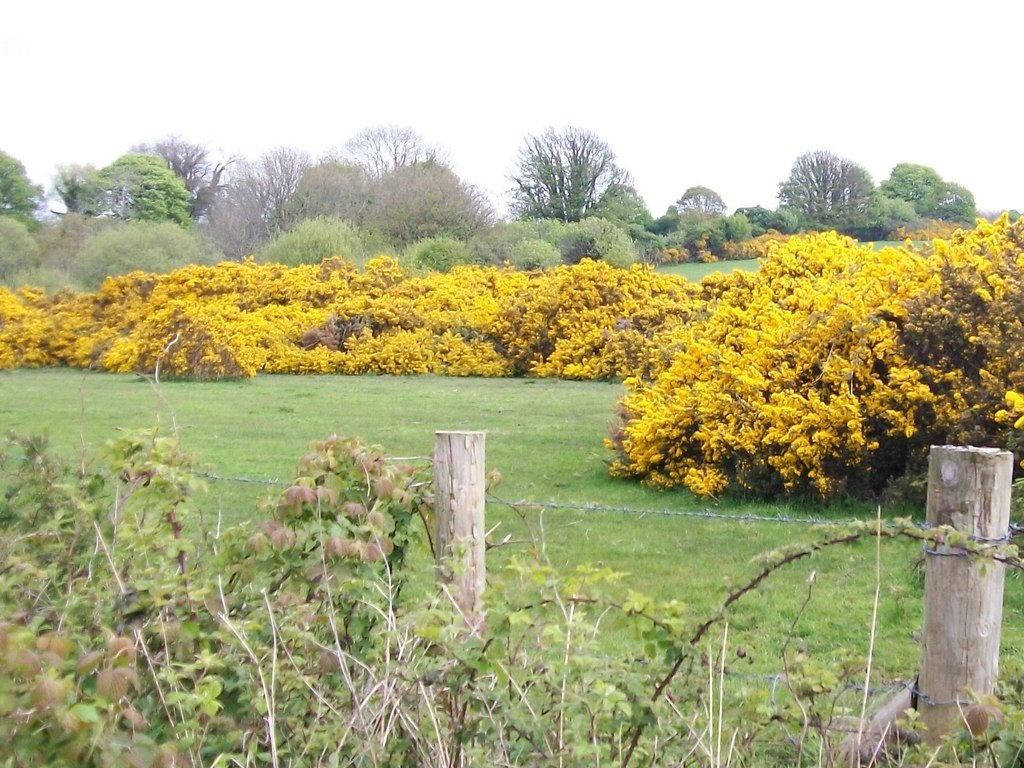
Gorse near the Ballybannon ASSI

Ballybannon is a small townland on the outskirts of the village of Annsborough in County Down, Northern Ireland. Ballybannon townland, which is approximately 562 acres (2.27 km^{2}) in area, lies within the civil parish of Kilmegan. The Ballybannan ASSI, a nearby Area of Special Scientific Interest, is a wetland with two small areas of vegetation. The Ballybannan River flows through the area.
