= Ballynagross =

Coordinates: 54°17′23″N 6°14′05″W

Ballynagross: Irish: Baile na gCros
- Townland
- Location within County Down
- County: County Down
- Country: Northern Ireland
- Sovereign state: United Kingdom
- Post town: Downpatrick
- Postcode district: BT30
- Dialling code: 028
- Police: Northern Ireland
- Fire: Northern Ireland
- Ambulance: Northern Ireland

Ballynagross (from Irish Baile na gCros, meaning 'townland of the crosses') is a townland of 368 acres (0.58 sq mi) in County Down, Northern Ireland. It is situated in the civil parish of Annaclone and the historic barony of Iveagh Upper, Upper Half.
