= Cabra, County Down =

Townland in County Down, Northern Ireland

Coordinates: 54.227°N 6.066°W

Cabra: Irish: Cabrach
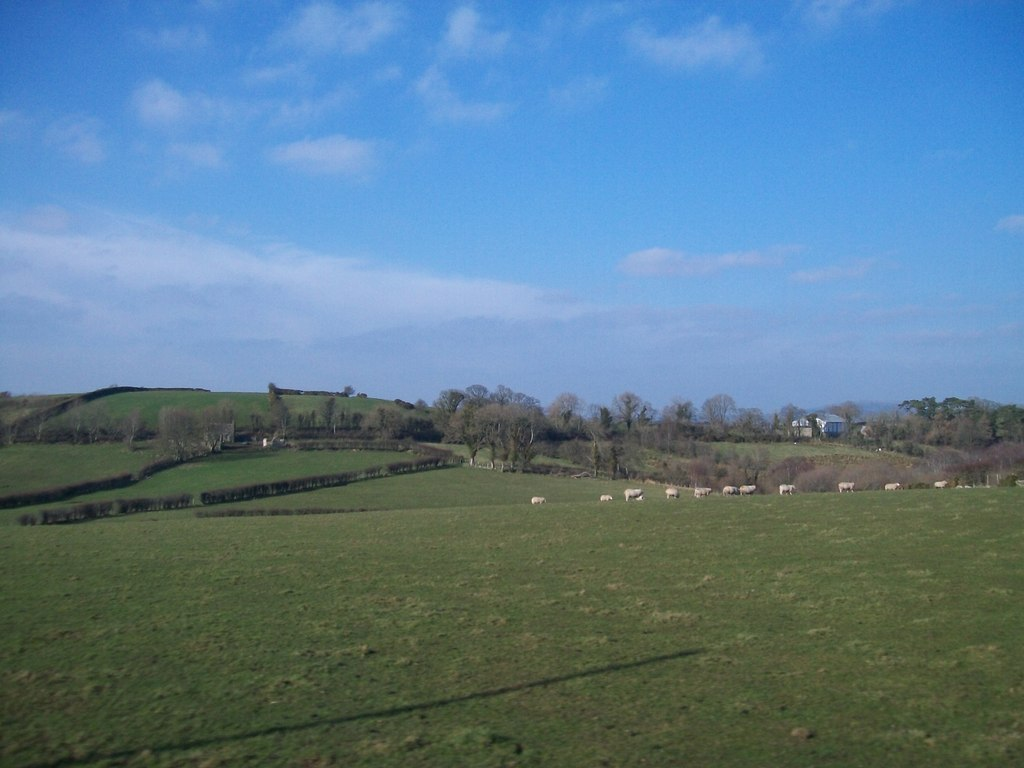
- Sheep grazing land west of St Marys Chapel, Cabra

- Location within County Down
- County: County Down
- Country: Northern Ireland
- Sovereign state: United Kingdom
- Post town: NEWRY
- Postcode district: BT34
- Dialling code: 028
- Police: Northern Ireland
- Fire: Northern Ireland
- Ambulance: Northern Ireland
- UK Parliament: South Down

Cabra is a large townland in County Down, Northern Ireland. It is in the parish of Clonduff and is situated approximately two miles from Hilltown, Rathfriland and Kilcoo. Cabra has a tradition of farming, with the three most common farming methods in Cabra being: sheep farming/breeding, crop growing (corn and barley) and cow farming/breeding.

"Townland stones" have been erected to keep Cabra in touch with its local heritage. Cabra has one primary school, St.Pauls; which has around 90 children attending. All together Cabra has around 150 residents living within its boundaries, with a small post office, one church, and a community hall.

== See also ==
- Clonduff GAC
