= Ardigon =

Townland in Northern Ireland

Coordinates: 54°24′29″N 5°41′53″W

Ardigon: Irish: Ard an Ghabhann
- Location within County Down
- County: County Down
- Country: Northern Ireland
- Sovereign state: United Kingdom
- Postcode district: BT
- Dialling code: 028

Ardigon (from Irish Ard an Ghabhann 'height of the smith') is a rural townland in County Down, Northern Ireland. It has an area of 484.5 acres (1.961 km^{2}). It is situated in the civil parish of Killyleagh and the historic barony of Dufferin, located 2 miles west of Killyleagh. It lies within the Newry, Mourne and Down District.

== See also ==
- List of townlands in County Down
