= Lisnasliggan =

Lisnasliggan: Irish: Lios na Sliogán
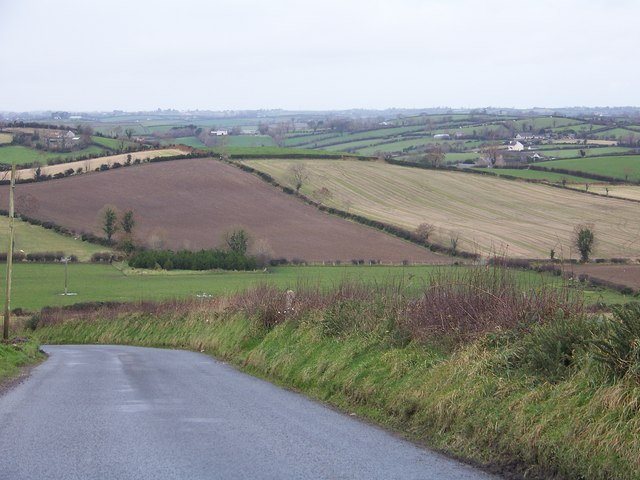
- Lisnasliggan townland in 2008
- County: County Down
- Country: Northern Ireland
- Sovereign state: United Kingdom
- Postcode district: BT32
- Dialling code: 028

Lisnasliggan (from Irish Lios na Sliogán, meaning 'fort of the shells') is a townland of 568 acres in County Down, Northern Ireland. It is situated in the civil parish of Annaclone and the historic barony of Iveagh Upper, Upper Half.

In 1834 it was recorded that there were still ‘seven ancient forts’ in Lisnasliggan. The townland also contains the Church of Ireland church of Christ Church built in 1860. It is a small Gothic church with three lancet windows on each side, a gabled porch on the south side, vestry on the north side and a bell-gable over the west façade.
