= Aghnatrisk =

Townland in Northern Ireland

Coordinates: 54°28′28″N 6°7′14″W

Aghnatrisk: Irish: Achadh na Triosca
- Location within County Down
- County: County Down
- Country: Northern Ireland
- Sovereign state: United Kingdom
- Postcode district: BT
- Dialling code: 028

Aghnatrisk (from Irish Achadh na Triosca 'field of the chaff or rough land') is a rural townland in County Down, Northern Ireland. It has an area of 252.03 acres (1.02 km^{2}). It is situated in the civil parish of Blaris (Iveagh portion) and the historic barony of Iveagh Lower, Upper Half, located 4 miles south-west of Lisburn. It lies within the Lisburn and Castlereagh City Council.

== See also ==
- List of townlands in County Down
