= Annahilt =

Village in County Down, Northern Ireland

Coordinates: 54.43763°N 6.00197°W

Annahilt/Anahilt: Irish: Eanach Eilte
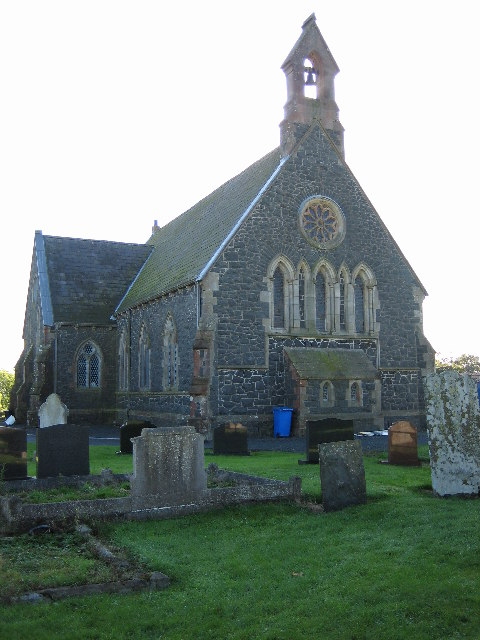
- Church of the Ascension, Annahilt

- Location within County Down
- Population: 1,034 (2021)
- Irish grid reference: J296562
  - Belfast: 14 mi (23 km)
- District: Lisburn
- County: County Down
- Country: Northern Ireland
- Sovereign state: United Kingdom
- Post town: HILLSBOROUGH
- Postcode district: BT26
- Dialling code: 028
- UK Parliament: Lagan Valley
- NI Assembly: Lagan Valley

Annahilt / Anahilt (from Irish Eanach Eilte) is a village and civil parish in north County Down, Northern Ireland. It is 7.5 miles (12 kilometres) south of Lisburn, and about 14 miles south-west of Belfast, on the main road between Ballynahinch and Hillsborough. In the 2021 census, the village had a population of 1,034. Annahilt has a distinctive drumlin setting, with a small wooded estate on a ridge to the west.

Annahilt has a primary school, hair dressers, Scout Hall, an Orange Hall and a play park. There is also a business park to the north, on the Glebe Road. Annahilt also has a caravan site, known as the 'Lakeside View Caravan Park', on the Magheraconluce Road.

== History ==
Maps of the early 19th century show little development at Annahilt beyond a schoolhouse and a small number of dwellings near the main crossroads. The settlement grew much in the second half of the 20th century. The primary school was founded in 1801.

A church was founded on the site of the current Annahilt Church of Ireland (Church of the Ascension) in the 8th century. Founded by Saint Molibba, it was known as Enaceilte. The church was rebuilt in 1422 and again in 1741, while the present church was built in 1856. The only remaining part of the medieval church is a ruined tower, which sits in the graveyard.

== Transport ==
Translink (Ulsterbus) operate bus services linking the village with Lisburn, Belfast, Dromara and Newcastle.

== Demography ==
Annahilt is classified as a village by the Northern Ireland Statistics and Research Agency (NISRA) (i.e. with population between 1,000 and 2,250 people). On census day in 2001, 29 April 2001, there were 1,148 people living in Annahilt. Of these:

- 27.2% were aged under 16 years and 13.3% were aged 60 and over
- 48.3% of the population were male and 51.7% were female
- 5.1% were from a Catholic background and 91.3% were from a Protestant background
- 2.6% of people aged 16–74 were unemployed

== Civil parish of Annahilt ==
The civil parish is mainly in the historic barony of Iveagh Lower, Lower Half, with one townland in the barony of Kinelarty.

=== Townlands ===
The civil parish contains the following townlands:

- Aghnaleck
- Ballycrune
- Ballykeel Lougherne
- Ballylintagh
- Ballymurphy
- Cargacreevy
- Cargygray
- Carricknadarriff
- Cluntagh
- Glebe
- Poundburn Magheraconluce

== See also ==
- List of civil parishes of County Down
