= Aghnaleck =

Townland in Northern Ireland

Coordinates: 54°27′26″N 5°59′8″W

Aghnaleck: Irish: Achadh na Leac
- Location within County Down
- County: County Down
- Country: Northern Ireland
- Sovereign state: United Kingdom
- Postcode district: BT
- Dialling code: 028

Aghnaleck (from Irish Achadh na Leac 'field of the flagstones') is a rural townland in County Down, Northern Ireland. It has an area of 673.3 acres (2.73 km^{2}). It is situated in the civil parish of Annahilt and the historic barony of Iveagh Lower, Lower Half, located 4.5 miles south-east of Lisburn. It lies within the Lisburn and Castlereagh City Council.

== See also ==
- List of townlands in County Down
