= Clonallan =

Civil parish in County Down, Northern Ireland

Clonallan is a civil parish in County Down, Northern Ireland. It is situated in the historic barony of Iveagh Upper, Upper Half. The parish has an area of 11,464 acres.

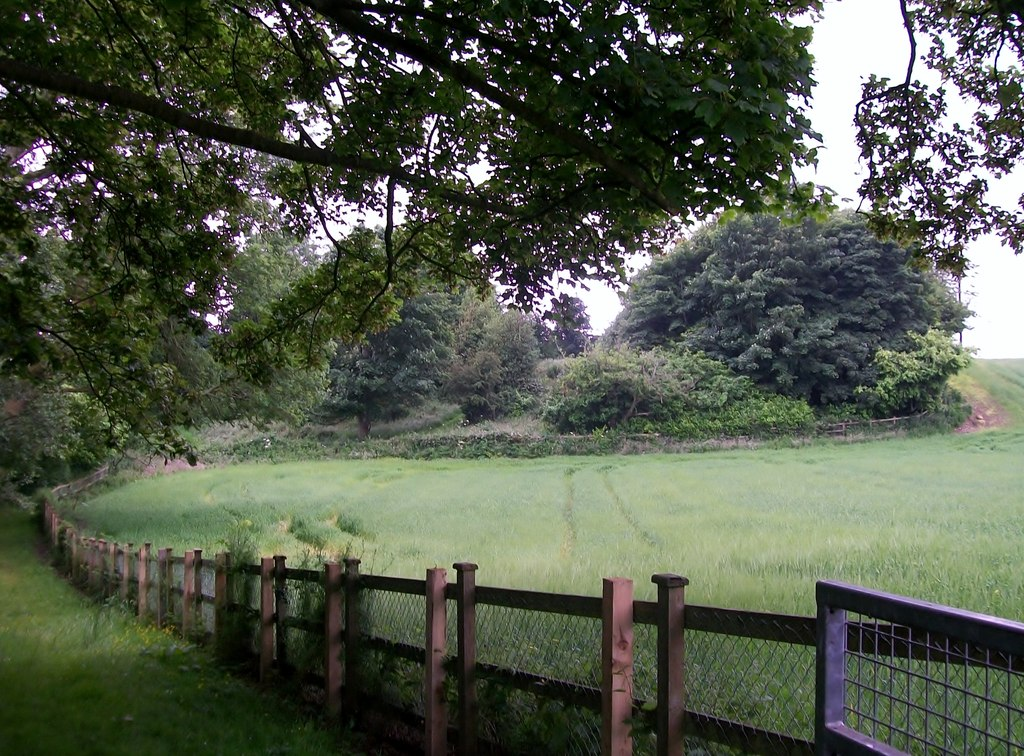
Clonallon Rath (geograph 3021709)

== Etymology ==
The name of the parish derives from the townland of Clonallan Glebe situated within the parish. The townland itself was originally named after the early Irish church founded there c.595 AD by Saint Dallán Forgaill. The original name of the church was Cluain Dalláin, meaning 'The Meadow of Dallán'. An archaeological excavation of part of the church was carried out in 2011. The Irish name was later corrupted into different spellings such as Clonallan, Clonallon, etc. Another early saint associated with the church was St. Conall, who succeeded Cairbre as Bishop of Coleraine in 560. He met Saint Columcille at Coleraine after the Synod of Drumceat c.595, according to Adomnán's Vitae Columbae. As Dallán was a poet, not a priest, it is likely he donated the meadow to Saint Conall to establish the church probably at the same time. The earliest surviving mention of the name is in St. Conall's genealogy quoted in the Book of Leinster composed c. 1160, which states- Conall m Aeda m Sharáin m Maine m Fhothaid m Conaill m Echdach m Cruind Ba Drui. Is é congaib Cluain Dallain i n-Dál Echach i fail Chúain Snama Ech. The Martrology of Gorman composed c. 1170, repeats this under the feast day of Saint Conall on 2 April,- Great Conall, son of Aed and the marginalia states- from Clúain Dalláin, near Snám Ech, i.e. the Cúan beside Cael in Húi Echach of Ulaid. The Martrology of Donegal, composed c. 1630, then repeats Gorman- Conall, son of Aedh, of Cluain (i.e., of Cluain-Dallain), near Snamh Each, i.e., the harbour near unto the Cael in Ui-Eathach of Uladh. He was of the race of Irial, son of Conall Cearnach. The Papal Annates for 1423 spell the name as Cluandallan and those for 1500 spell it as Claondalan. In Downpatrick further to the north is a well now called 'St. Dillon's Well'. There is no Irish saint called Dillon but in 1875 John O'Hanlon (writer) in his book 'Lives of the Irish Saints' (Vol. 3, page 794n) called it St. Dallán's Well, which is probably more correct as Dillon seems to be a corruption on Dallan.

== Townlands ==
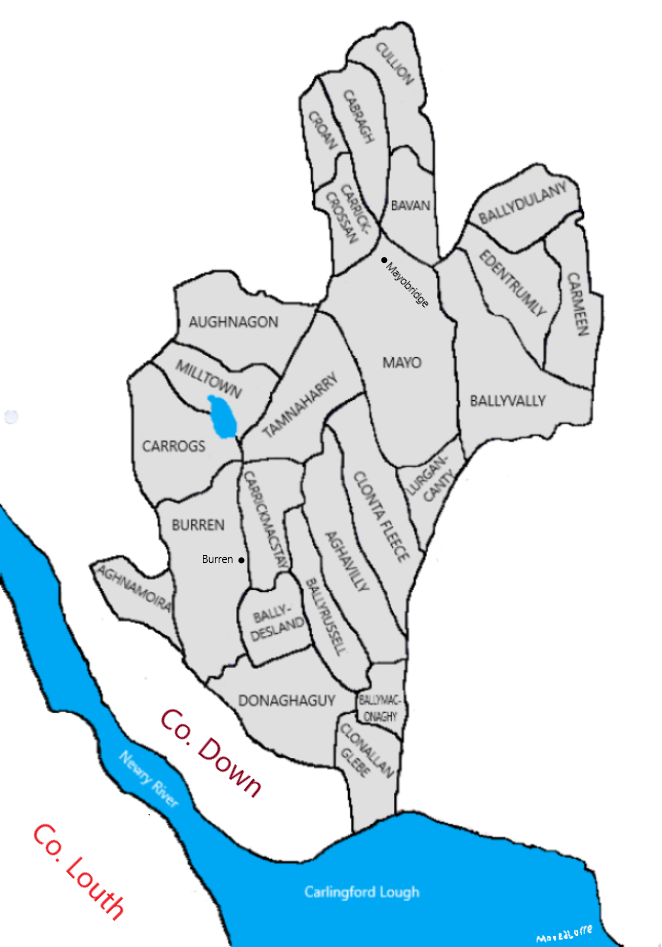
A map of Clonallan civil parish

Clonallan civil parish contains the following townlands:

- Aghavilly
- Aghnamoira
- Aughnagon
- Ballydesland
- Ballydulany
- Ballymaconaghy
- Ballyrussell
- Ballyvally
- Bavan
- Burren
- Cabragh
- Carmeen
- Carrickcrossan
- Carrickmacstay
- Carrogs
- Clonallan Glebe
- Clonta Fleece
- Croan
- Cullion
- Donaghaguy
- Edentrumly
- Lurgancanty
- Mayo
- Milltown
- Tamnaharry

== See also ==
- List of civil parishes of County Down
