= Mazetown =

Coordinates: 54.488°N 6.123°W

Mazetown: Irish: an Mhaigh
- Location within County Down
- Population: 363 (2001 Census)
- District: Lisburn
- County: County Down
- Country: Northern Ireland
- Sovereign state: United Kingdom
- Post town: LISBURN
- Postcode district: BT28
- Dialling code: 028
- UK Parliament: Lagan Valley
- NI Assembly: Lagan Valley

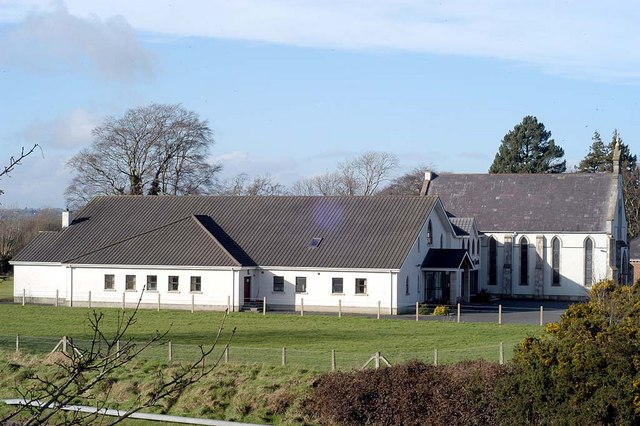
Maze Presbyterian Hall and Church

Mazetown or Maze (possibly from Irish an Mhias 'the basin', otherwise known as an Mhaigh meaning "the plain") is a small village in County Down, Northern Ireland. It was named after the townland of Maze. The village and townland sit on the southern bank of the River Lagan, which separates it from Lurganure. This river is also the boundary between County Down and County Antrim.

It is within the Lisburn City Council area, and the Maze electoral ward. In the 2001 Census, there were 363 residents.

== Places of interest ==
Maze is the former site of Royal Air Force (RAF) station Long Kesh and an HM Prison that closed in 2000. HM Prison Maze was the main internment centre in Northern Ireland for paramilitary prisoners during the 1970s and was the focus of the 1981 Irish Hunger Strike. Past proposals for site development have included a stadium and a museum, but were not realized as of March 2025.

== See also ==
- Maze (electoral ward)
- List of towns and villages in Northern Ireland
