= Aghacullion =

Townland in Northern Ireland

Coordinates: 54°13′39″N 5°57′4″W

Aghacullion: Irish: Achadh an Chuilinn
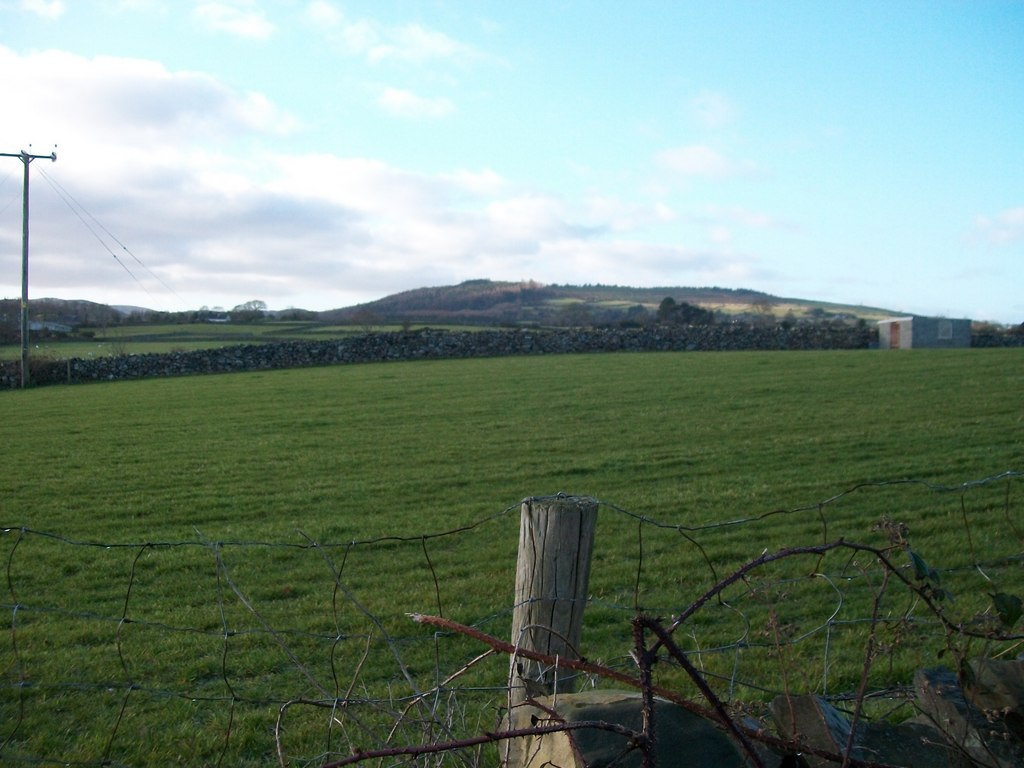
- Farmland west of the Burrenreagh Road in Aghacullion

- Location within County Down
- County: County Down
- Country: Northern Ireland
- Sovereign state: United Kingdom
- Postcode district: BT
- Dialling code: 028

Aghacullion (from Irish Achadh an Chuilinn 'field of the holly') is a rural townland in County Down, Northern Ireland. It has an area of 223.77 acres (0.91 km^{2}). It is situated in the civil parish of Kilcoo and the historic barony of Iveagh Upper, Lower Half, located miles 2 north-west of Newcastle. It lies within the Newry, Mourne and Down District Council.

== See also ==
- List of townlands in County Down
