= Ardaghy =

Townland in Northern Ireland

Coordinates: 54°14′55″N 6°1′59″W

Ardaghy: Irish: Ard Eachaidh
- Location within County Down
- County: County Down
- Country: Northern Ireland
- Sovereign state: United Kingdom
- Postcode district: BT
- Dialling code: 028

Ardaghy (from Irish Ard Eachaidh 'Eachaidh's height') is a rural townland in County Down, Northern Ireland. It has an area of 372.6 acres (1.51 km^{2}). It is situated in the civil parish of Kilcoo and the historic barony of Iveagh Upper, Lower Half, located 3.5 miles west of Castlewellan.

== See also ==
- List of townlands in County Down
