= Ballycam =

Townland in County Down, Northern Ireland

Coordinates: 54°14′34″N 5°39′32″W

Ballycam: Irish: An Baile Cam ‘the crooked townland’
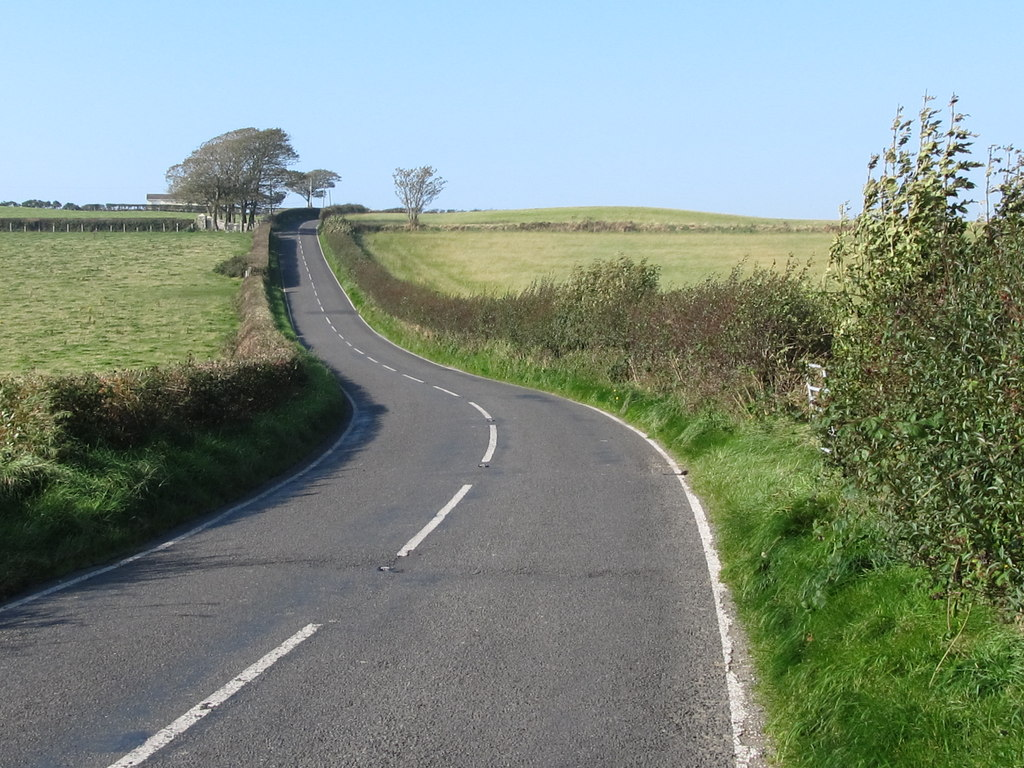
- Road climbing the ridge above Rossglass in Ballycam

- Location within Northern Ireland Location within County Down Ballycam (County Down)
- District: Newry, Mourne and Down
- County: County Down
- Country: Northern Ireland
- Sovereign state: United Kingdom
- Post town: DOWNPATRICK
- Postcode district: BT30
- Dialling code: 028
- UK Parliament: South Down
- NI Assembly: South Down

Ballycam (Irish: An Baile Cam, meaning 'the crooked townland') is a townland, south of Downpatrick in County Down, Northern Ireland. The townland is approximately 1.2 km^{2} (308.86 acres) in area. It is situated in the civil parish of Bright and the historic barony of Lecale Upper.

== Name ==
Although a historical record from 1637 refers to it as "Ballyvickany", this spelling may be an error, as it does not match other historical versions of the name.

Ballycam, derived from the Irish An Baile Cam meaning 'the crooked townland', may derive from the shape of the townland. It has an irregular outline that extends from Rossglass Road, west of Killough, to the coastline just north of Saint John's Point.

== Habitat and biodiversity ==
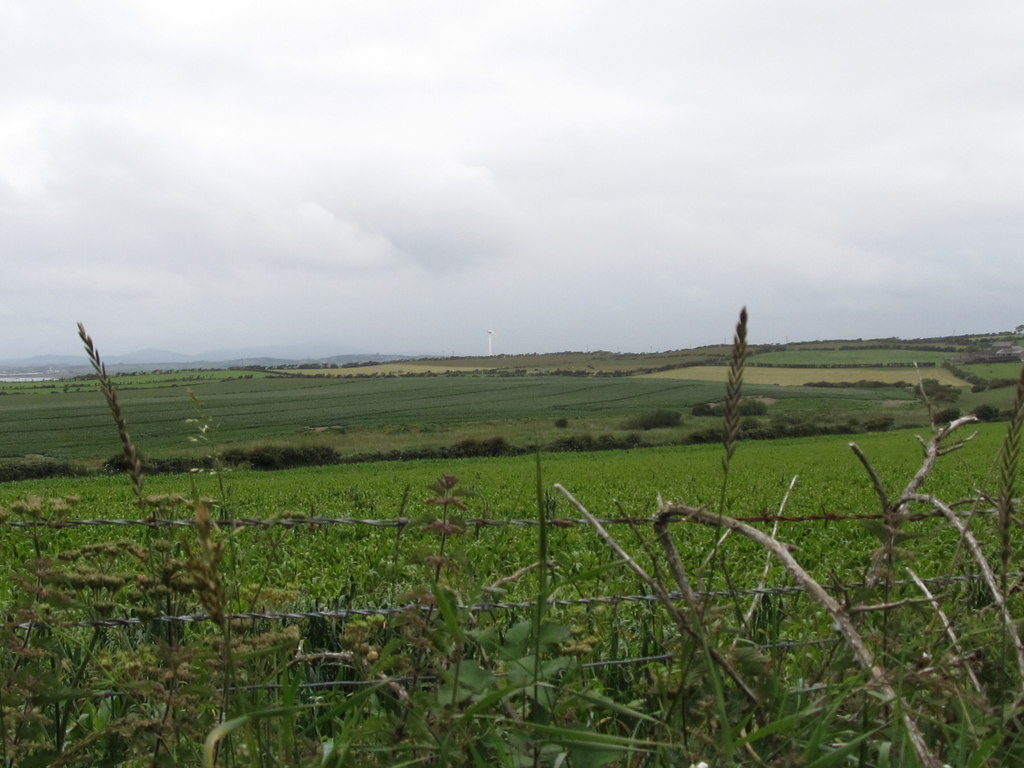
Looking across Ballycam ASSI

Ballycam ASSI (Area of Special Scientific Interest) is a designated protected habitat. The site features a variety of fen communities, including the only known example in Northern Ireland of a fen type typically restricted to lowland areas of England and Wales. The habitat is characterised by the dominance of black bog-rush (Schoenus nigricans) and blunt-flowered rush (Juncus subnodulosus), alongside swamp areas dominated by common reed (Phragmites australis) and fen zones featuring bottle sedge (Carex rostrata) and marsh cinquefoil (Comarum palustre). These wetland communities transition into mesotrophic grasslands around the site's margins, often incorporating fen species.

== Geography ==
Townlands that border Ballycam include:

- Ballylig to the north
- Commonreagh to the west
- Crolly's Quarter to the west
- Kilbride to the east
- Killough to the north
- Rossglass to the west
- Saint Johns Point to the south
