= Derrylough, County Down =

Townland in County Down, Northern Ireland

Derrylough: Irish: Doire Locha
- County: County Down
- Country: Northern Ireland
- Sovereign state: United Kingdom
- Postcode district: BT32
- Dialling code: 028

Derrylough (from Irish Doire Locha, meaning 'oak-wood of the lake') is a townland of 222 acres in County Down, Northern Ireland. It is situated in the civil parish of Annaclone and the historic barony of Iveagh Upper, Upper Half. It is the most northerly townland in the parish of Annaclone.
