= Aghandunvarran =

Townland in Northern Ireland

Coordinates: 54°26′25″N 6°6′17″W

Aghandunvarran: Irish: Achadh Dúin Bhearáin
- Location within County Down
- County: County Down
- Country: Northern Ireland
- Sovereign state: United Kingdom
- Postcode district: BT
- Dialling code: 028

Aghandunvarran (from Irish Achadh Dúin Bhearáin 'the field of Bearán’s fort') is a rural townland in County Down, Northern Ireland. It has an area of 514.76 acres (2.08 km^{2}). It is situated in the civil parish of Royal Hillsborough and the historic barony of Iveagh Lower, Lower Half, located 2.6 miles north-east of Dromore. It lies within the Lisburn City and Castlereagh District Council.

== See also ==
- List of townlands in County Down
