= Lurganare =

Coordinates: 54.230°N 6.352°W

Lurganare: Irish: Lorga an Áir
- Village
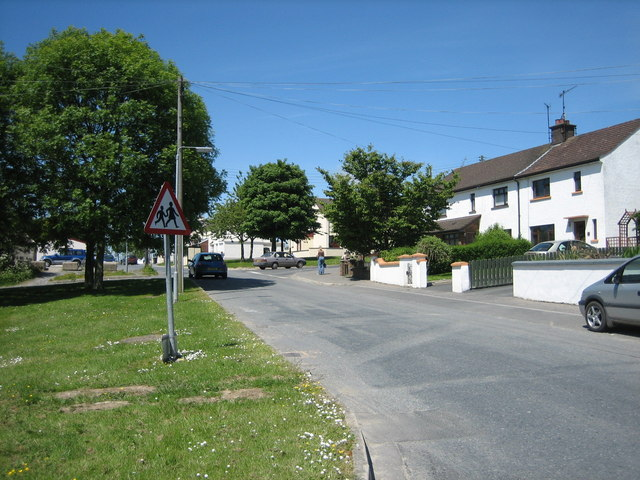
- Housing in Lurganare

- Location within County Down
- District: Newry, Mourne and Down
- County: County Down
- Country: Northern Ireland
- Sovereign state: United Kingdom
- Post town: NEWRY
- Postcode district: BT34
- Dialling code: 028
- Police: Northern Ireland
- Fire: Northern Ireland
- Ambulance: Northern Ireland

Lurganare (from Irish Lorga an Áir, meaning 'tract of the slaughter') is a small village and townland in County Down, Northern Ireland, four miles north of Newry. It had a population of 195 at the 2001 census. It lies within the Newry, Mourne and Down District Council area. The local primary school, St Mary's Primary School, had an enrolment of 118 pupils as of 2011.

== See also ==
- List of villages in Northern Ireland
