= Kilcoo =

Village in County Down, Northern Ireland

Coordinates: 54.232°N 6.029°W

Kilcoo: Irish: Cill Chua
- Location within County Down
- Population: 496 (2021 census)
- District: Newry, Mourne and Down District Council
- County: County Down
- Country: Northern Ireland
- Sovereign state: United Kingdom
- Post town: NEWRY
- Postcode district: BT
- Dialling code: 028
- NI Assembly: South Down

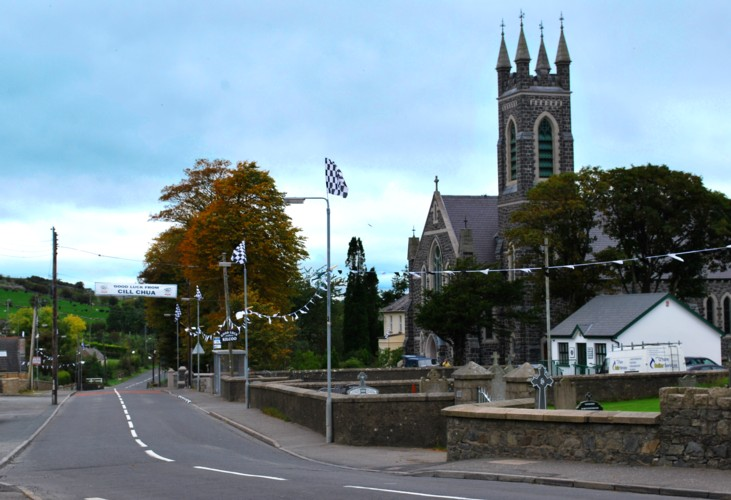
Kilcoo, County Down, decorated in Kilcoo GAC’s colours, 2009

Kilcoo (from Irish Cill Chua, meaning 'church of mourning' – from the legend that Saint Patrick's body stayed there while on its way to Downpatrick to be buried) is a small village and civil parish in County Down, Northern Ireland. It lies between Rathfriland and Castlewellan and is within the Newry, Mourne and Down District Council area. The village is on the A25 Dublin Road 6 kilometres (4 mi) south-west of Castlewellan. Kilcoo had a population 496 people as of the 2021 census.

== Places of interest ==
Near Kilcoo is Lough Island Reavy, a small man-made lough. East of the lough is Drumena Cashel, a stone ringfort that was used in the Early Christian period (500–1200 AD).

== Education ==
Saint Malachy's Primary School is a mixed gender school for students between the age of 4 and 11. It was opened in September 1970.

== Sport ==
The village has one sporting club, Kilcoo GAC. This a Gaelic Athletic Association club with teams in Gaelic football and Camogie

== Demographics ==
For the 2001 census, Kilcoo was classified as a rural settlement by the Northern Ireland Statistics and Research Agency (NISRA). Kilcoo was named as "Tollymore Ward SOA 1 (Super Output Area)" and the 2001 census data contained the village itself and its surrounding townlands. On census day in 2001 (29 April 2001), there were 1415 people living in the Kilcoo area. Of these:

- 29.6% were under 16 years old and 12.2% were aged 60 and above
- 53.1% of the population were male and 46.9% were female
- 99.6% were from a Catholic Community Background and 0.4% were from a 'Protestant and Other Christian (including Christian related)' Community Background.
- 1.1% of people aged 16–74 were unemployed.

For the 2011 and 2021 censuses, the population of Kilcoo village was recorded as 335 and 496 respectively.

== Civil parish of Kilcoo ==
The civil parish is mainly in the historic barony of Iveagh Upper, Lower Half with one townland in Iveagh Upper, Upper Half.

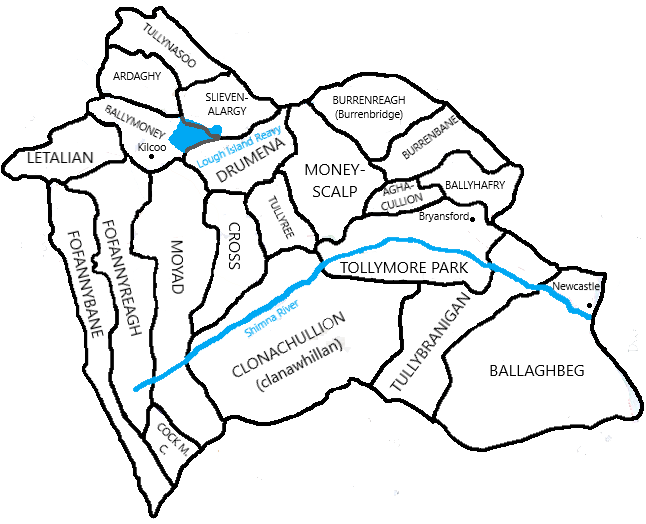
Map of the Kilcoo Parish

=== Townlands ===
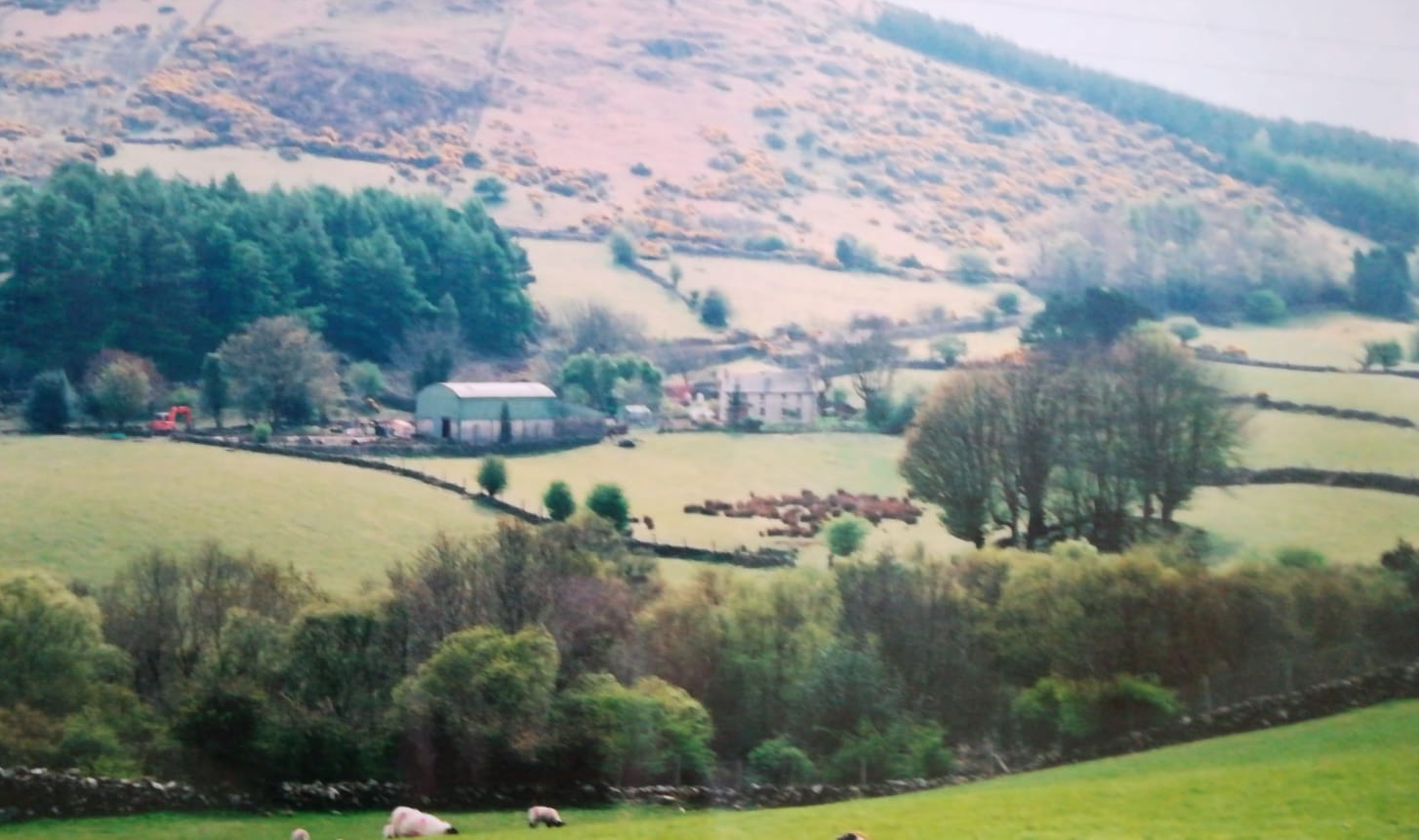
Clonachullion (or Clanawhillan) townland in the civil parish of Kilcoo

The civil parish contains the following townlands:

- Aghacullion
- Ardaghy
- Ballaghbeg
- Ballyhafry
- Ballymoney
- Burrenbane
- Burrenreagh
- Clonachullion
- Cock Mountain Common
- Cross
- Drumena
- Fofannybane
- Fofannyreagh
- Letalian
- Moneyscalp
- Moyad
- Slievenalargy
- Tollymore Park
- Tullybranigan
- Tullynasoo
- Tullyree

== See also ==
- List of civil parishes of County Down
