= Kilbride, County Down =

Townland in County Down, Northern Ireland

Coordinates: 54°14′41″N 5°38′55″W

Kilbride: Irish: Cill Bhríde ‘(Saint) Brigid’s church’
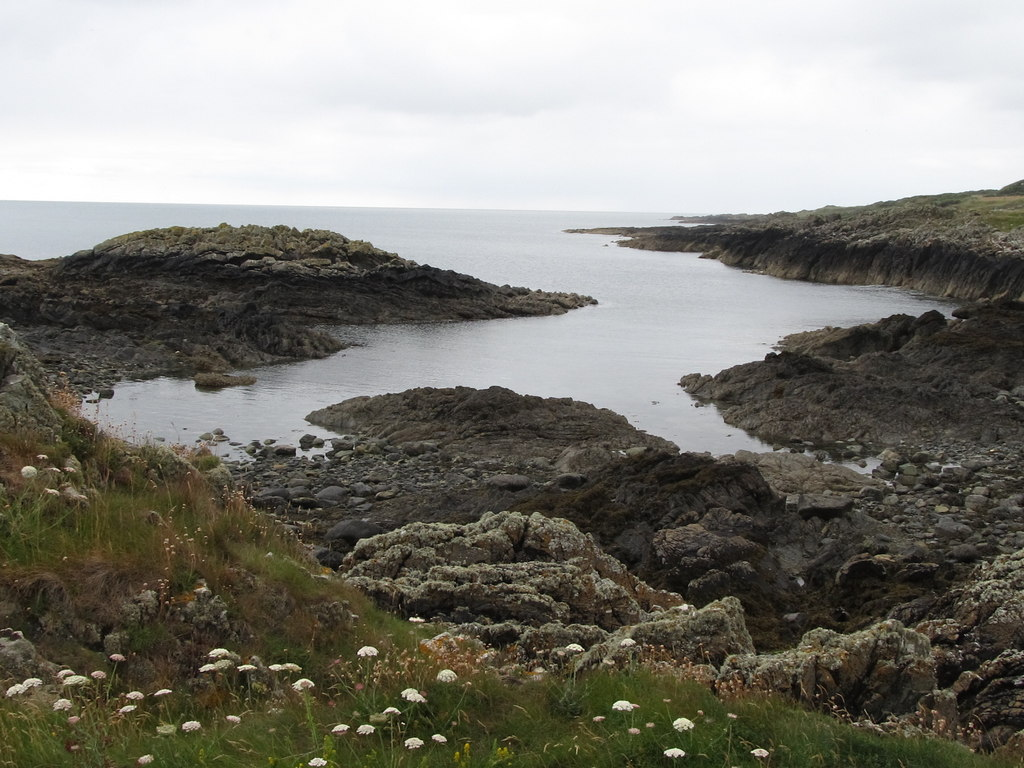
- Coastal inlet south of Corbet Head in Kilbride

- Location within Northern Ireland Location within County Down Kilbride (County Down)
- Irish grid reference: J496438
- District: Newry, Mourne and Down
- County: County Down
- Country: Northern Ireland
- Sovereign state: United Kingdom
- Post town: DOWNPATRICK
- Postcode district: BT30
- Dialling code: 028
- UK Parliament: South Down
- NI Assembly: South Down

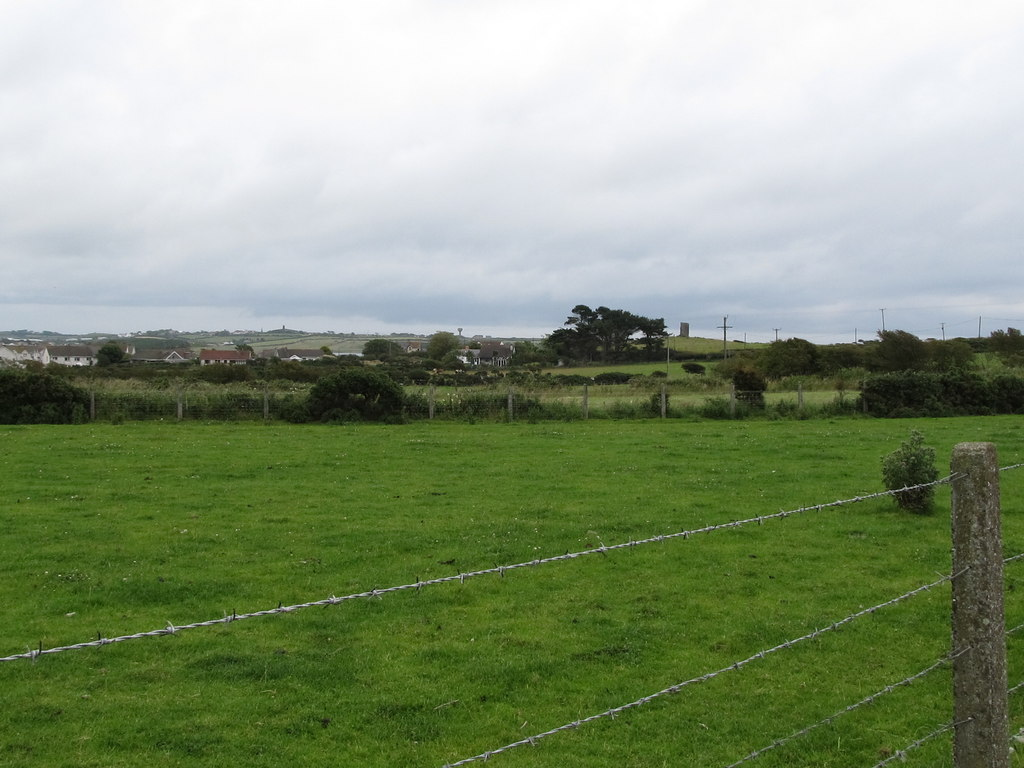
Farmland in Kilbride on the western outskirts of Killough (ruins of a windmill in the background)

Kilbride (Irish: Cill Bhríde, meaning '(Saint) Brigid’s church') is a townland located south of Downpatrick in County Down, Northern Ireland. It covers approximately 1.4 km^{2} (335.96 acres). The townland lies within the civil parish of Bright and the historic barony of Lecale Upper.

== History ==
The townland is historically associated with the site of an early church. The church is recorded as Kilbride in Lethcathel in a charter dated 1168 (commonly referred to as the Dower Charter), and as Capella de Kilbride in the Papal Taxation of circa 1306 (Ecclesiastical Taxation, entry 34). According to an Inquisition held in the third year of Edward VI and the Terrier of ecclesiastical property, the church of Kilbride, with an annual value of 53 shillings and 4 pence, was appropriated to the Priory of Regular Canons of Down. Under the charter of James I, it was annexed to the Deanery of Down under the name Kilbriditche.

The church was located in a field known locally as "the Church Park," approximately three-quarters of a mile southwest of Killough. It was demolished in 1830, and no structural remains survive. However, an ancient tombstone bearing a carved cross was preserved and incorporated into a nearby stile. Writing in 1878, historian James O’Laverty noted that stone-lined graves had been discovered around the site, indicating the presence of a substantial cemetery, which had since been brought under cultivation.

== Aquaculture ==
Corbet Head in Kilbride has favourable conditions for seaweed farming, including clean, nutrient-rich waters suitable for growing Alaria esculenta, a brown seaweed used for food and other purposes. Research from the University of Galway indicates strong growth and hybrid vigour in seaweed from this area.

== Geography ==
Townlands that border Kilbride include:

- Ballycam to the west
- Commonreagh to the west
- Killough to the north
