= Ballynagallagh =

Townland in County Down, Northern Ireland

Coordinates: 54°15′38″N 5°42′29″W

Ballynagallagh: Irish: Baile na gCailleach ‘townland of the nuns’
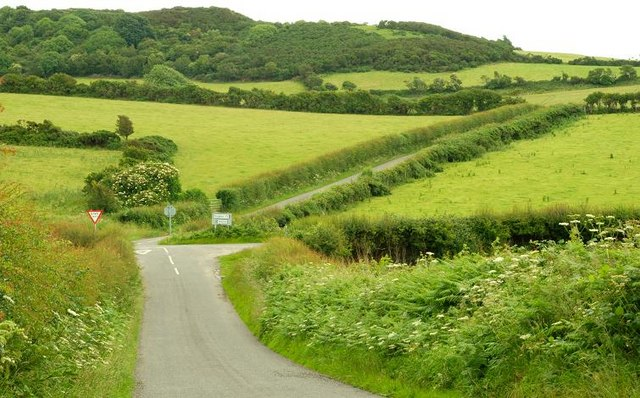
- The Bright Road in Ballynagallagh near Minerstown

- Location within Northern Ireland Location within County Down Ballynagallagh (County Down)
- District: Newry, Mourne and Down
- County: County Down
- Country: Northern Ireland
- Sovereign state: United Kingdom
- Post town: DOWNPATRICK
- Postcode district: BT30
- Dialling code: 028
- UK Parliament: South Down
- NI Assembly: South Down

Ballynagallagh (Irish: Baile na gCailleach, meaning 'townland of the nuns') is a townland, south of Downpatrick in County Down, Northern Ireland. The townland is approximately 0.75 km^{2} (185.89 acres) in area. It is situated in the civil parish of Bright and the historic barony of Lecale Upper.

== History ==
The earliest recorded reference to the area appears in a 1427 inquisition, where it was listed as Nunton and identified as a possession of the prioress and convent of the Blessed Mary of Down, based in Downpatrick. This ecclesiastical connection is reflected in the townland's Irish name.

In the early 15th century, a carucate of land in Ballynagallagh was granted to Sir Janico D'Artois, a Gascon noble who served as Seneschal of Ulster. This grant was confirmed in a post-mortem inquisition following his death in 1426.

Ballynagallagh, along with other lands in the parish of Bright, came into the possession of the Kildare family through the marriage of Gerald FitzGerald, 8th Earl of Kildare, to Alison Eustace, granddaughter of Sir Janico D'Artois. This marital alliance is considered a more probable explanation for the Kildare family's acquisition of territory in Lecale than the traditional account of political support for the Magennis family.

Following the rebellion and subsequent conviction for treason of Thomas FitzGerald, 10th Earl of Kildare (commonly known as Silken Thomas), during the reign of Henry VIII, the Kildare estates in Lecale, including Ballynagallagh, were confiscated by the Crown. These lands were then leased to various individuals. In 1552, the estates were restored to Gerald FitzGerald, 11th Earl of Kildare, whose rights were confirmed by letters patent issued by Queen Mary in 1554, and reaffirmed under the joint reign of Philip and Mary in 1555, and again by Queen Elizabeth I in 1583.

== Archeology ==
In the 19th century, historian James O’Laverty recorded the discovery of several stone-lined graves in the townland, located north of the country road and near the ridge of a hill.

== Geography ==
Townlands that border Ballynagallagh include:

- Ballydargan to the north
- Ballyvaston to the east
- Carrowbane to the north
- Rathmullan Lower to the west
