= Ballysheil, County Armagh =

Electoral division in Northern Ireland

Coordinates: 54°18′54″N 6°24′58″W

Ballysheil
- Location within Northern Ireland
- Country: Northern Ireland
- Sovereign state: United Kingdom
- Police: Northern Ireland
- Fire: Northern Ireland
- Ambulance: Northern Ireland

Ballysheil was an Electoral Division of Tanderagee Rural District in County Armagh, Northern Ireland, with an area of 4,258 acres. It existed from 1923 until 1 October 1973, when the Local Government Act (Northern Ireland) 1972 replaced it and other local authorities with 26 new districts.

It consisted of 15 townlands, two of which, Ballysheil More and Ballysheil Beg, gave it its name.

Ballysheil More is a townland of 339 acres in County Armagh, Northern Ireland. It is one of at least 48 townlands in the civil parish of Ballymore, in the historic barony of Orior Lower.

Ballysheil Beg is a townland of 300 acres and is also situated within the civil parish of Ballymore, and the historic barony of Orior Lower.

== Orange hall ==
Ballysheil Orange Hall is home to Beers True Blues LOL 105.

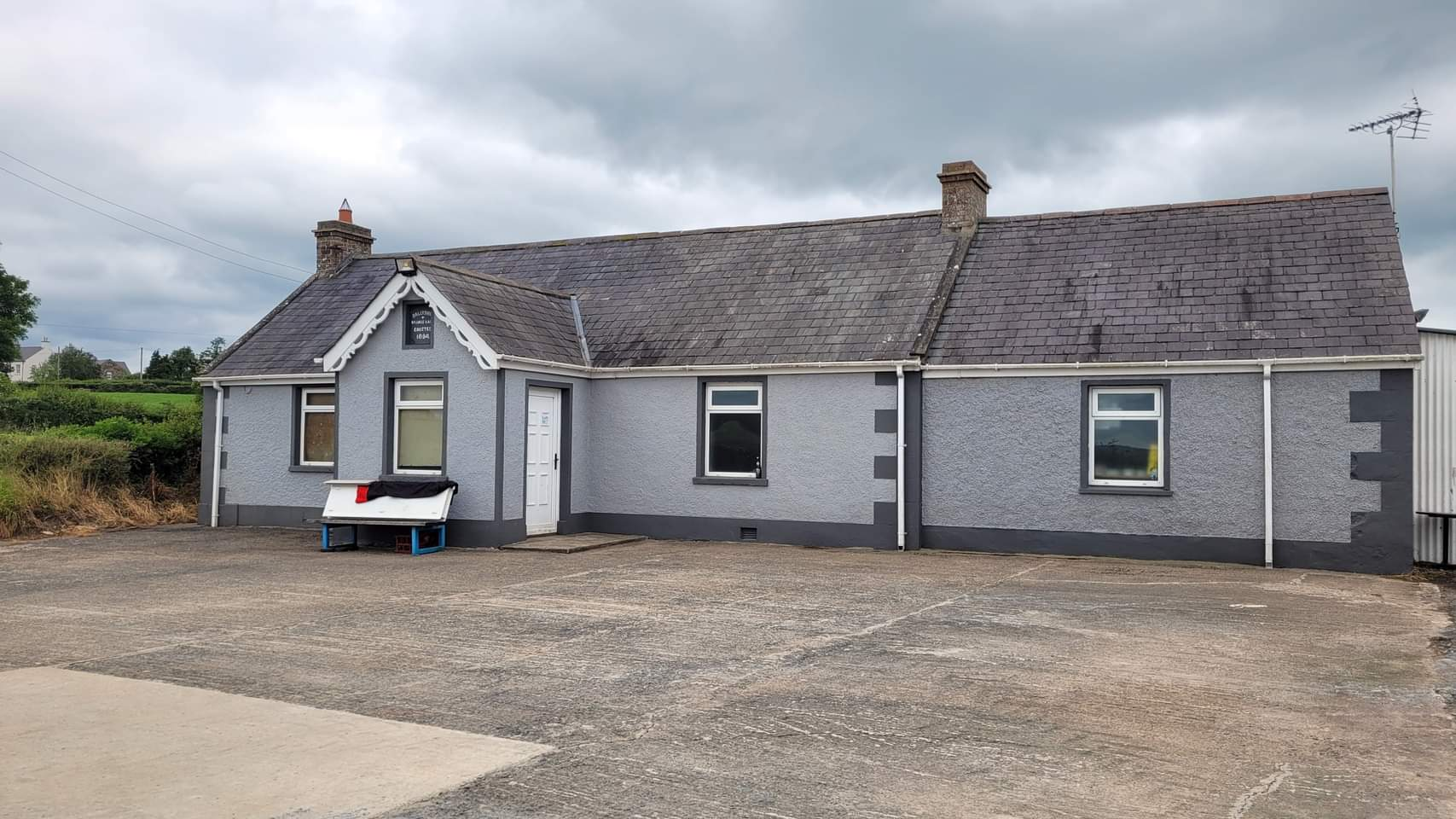
Ballysheil Orange Hall (2024)

The origins of the hall trace back to 1894, when Lieutenant-Colonel William Beers (1836–1919), then landlord of the Ballysheil townland, donated a rent collector's cottage along with the adjacent land to the Lodge for use as an Orange Hall. Prior to this, the building had served as the residence of the rent collector.

Lieutenant-Colonel Beers was the son of the William Beers known for his role at Dolly's Brae, who also held the position of Grand Master for County Down. The Orange Lodge is named after the Beers family, from whom the land for the hall was originally acquired.

== See also ==
- List of townlands of County Armagh
- List of rural and urban districts in Northern Ireland
