= Lurganure =

Village in County Antrim, Northern Ireland

Coordinates: 54.500°N 6.117°W

Lurganure: Irish: Lurga an Iubhair
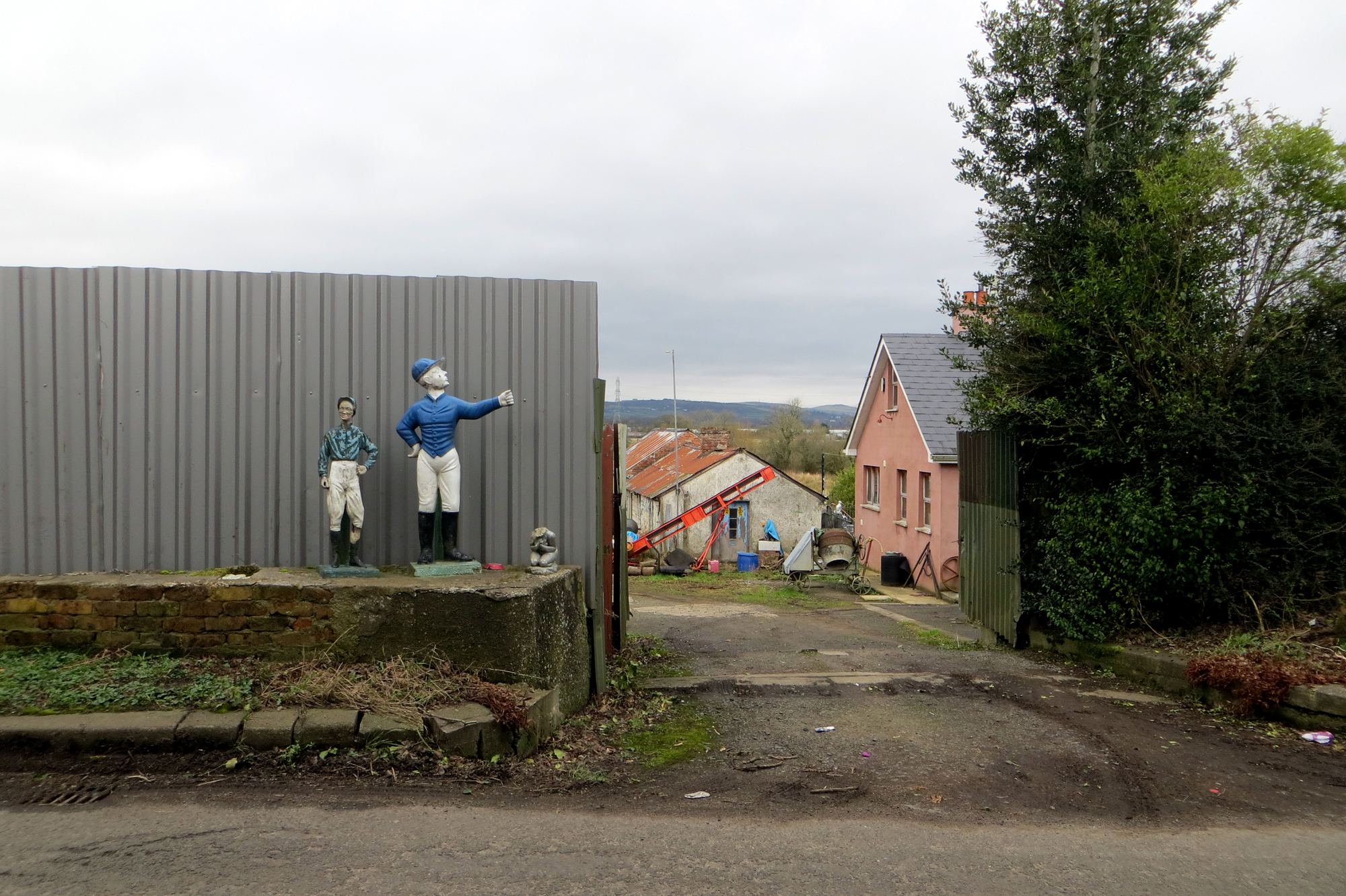

- Location within Northern Ireland
- Population: 441
  - Belfast: 11 mi (18 km)
- District: Lisburn and Castlereagh
- County: County Antrim
- Country: Northern Ireland
- Sovereign state: United Kingdom
- Post town: LISBURN
- Postcode district: BT28
- Dialling code: 028
- Police: Northern Ireland
- Fire: Northern Ireland
- Ambulance: Northern Ireland
- UK Parliament: Lagan Valley
- NI Assembly: Lagan Valley

Lurganure (from Irish Lurga an Iubhair, meaning 'long ridge of the yew') is a small village and townland in County Antrim, Northern Ireland. It lies to the west of Lisburn and is separated from Mazetown by the River Lagan. In the 2001 Census it had a population of 441 people. It is in the Lisburn City Council area.

== See also ==
- List of towns and villages in Northern Ireland
