= Ballynagarrick =

Townland in County Armagh, Northern Ireland

Coordinates: 54°24′10″N 6°22′24″W

Ballynagarrick (from Irish Baile na gCarraig 'townland of the rocks') is a townland situated outside Craigavon, County Armagh, Northern Ireland. The literal translation of the name means town (land) of the rocks, and indeed in bygone days two quarries were situated on the small townland.

2. Ballynagarrick (Baile na gCarraig) is a small townland in the area of Kilclief (Irish: Cill Cleithe - "Church of the Wattles"), a parish in the area of Lecale, County Armagh. Ballynagarrick is bordered by the townlands of Ballynarry, Ballywooden and Ballyorgan. It largely consists of two major laneways, once part of a larger circuit of laneways across the area which linked into the former British Army barracks at Bishopscourt. Many of these laneways are now abandoned.
