= Ballynafoy (Annaclone) =

Ballynafoy: Irish: Baile na Faiche
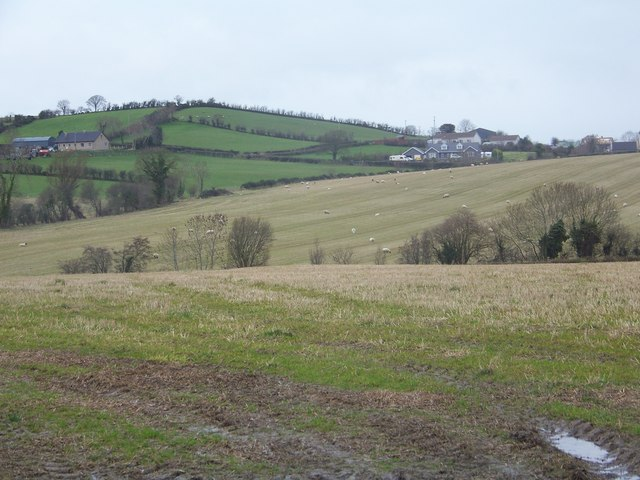
- Ballynafoy in 2008
- Civil parish: Annaclone
- County: County Down
- Country: Northern Ireland
- Sovereign state: United Kingdom
- Police: Northern Ireland
- Fire: Northern Ireland
- Ambulance: Northern Ireland

Ballynafoy (Annaclone) (from Irish Baile na Faiche, meaning 'townland of the green') is a townland of 901 acres in County Down, Northern Ireland. It is situated in the civil parish of Annaclone and the historic barony of Iveagh Upper, Upper Half.

Ballynafoy Hill (612 ft) is the highest point in the parish. Near the summit is a standing stone and there is a rath nearby on the south-eastern slope of the hill and another lower down.

There is a townland of the same name in the civil parish of Knockbreda in the historic barony of Castlereagh Upper.
