= Ballyvange =

Townland in County Down, Northern Ireland

Coordinates: 54°18′38″N 5°43′01″W

Ballyvange: Irish: Baile Bhéin ‘Baines’s townland’
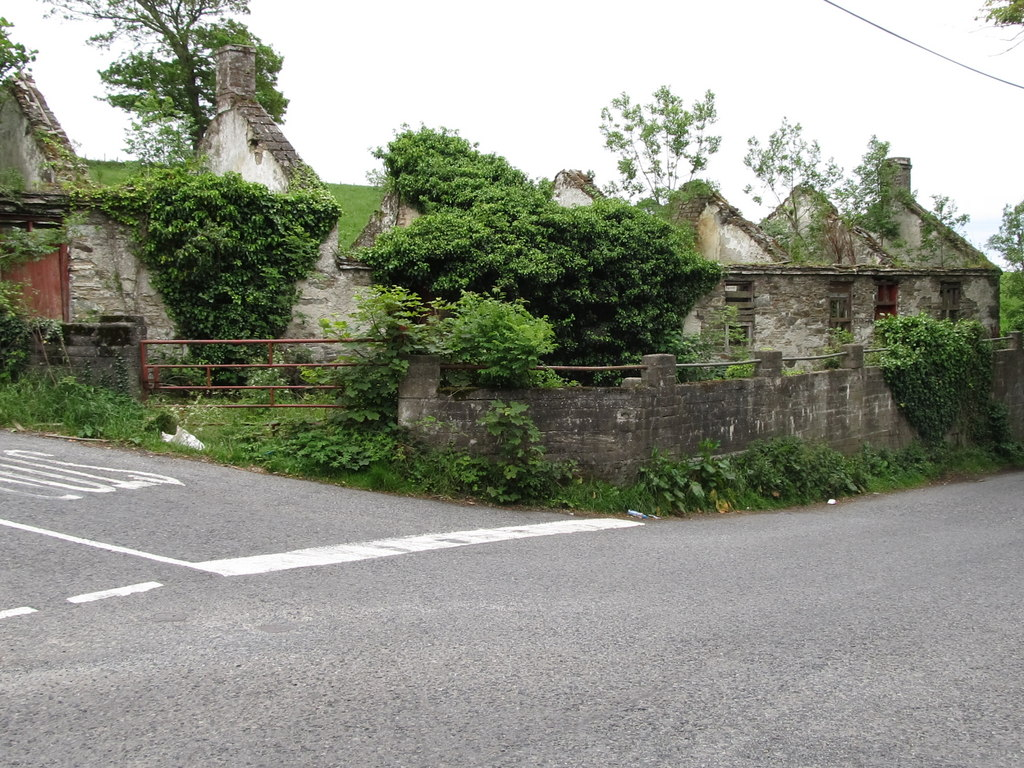
- Junction of Vianstown Road and Bishops Brae

- Location within Northern Ireland Location within County Down Ballyvange (County Down)
- Irish grid reference: J480423
- District: Newry, Mourne and Down
- County: County Down
- Country: Northern Ireland
- Sovereign state: United Kingdom
- Post town: DOWNPATRICK
- Postcode district: BT30 8AF
- Dialling code: 028
- UK Parliament: South Down
- NI Assembly: South Down

Ballyvange is a townland in County Down, Northern Ireland. The townland, which is within the town of Downpatrick, is situated within the electoral division of Downpatrick, the civil parish of Down, and the historical barony of Lecale Upper. Its postcode lies within the Ballydugan ward, which is part of the UK Parliamentary Constituency of South Down.

== History ==
Ballyvange has had several different names over the centuries. In 1621, it was recorded as Balliveines or Baynestowne. By 1635, it appeared as Ramston, Veanston, or Ballyvehan, and around 1659, it was listed as Ballybaines in the census that year. These names all seem to come from the Irish Baile Bhéin, which is a Gaelic version of an earlier English name. The original name likely included an English surname, probably brought over by the Normans, combined with the word town. According to researcher Percy Reaney, the surname Bain (and its variations like Baine, Baines, Bains, Baynes, and Bayns) could have come from several different sources:

- A nickname from Old English ban, meaning “bone” (which later became bain in northern England and Scotland).
- The Old Norse word beinn, meaning “straight” or “hospitable.”
- The Gaelic word bán, meaning “fair” or “white.”
- The French word bain, meaning “bath,” possibly referring to someone who worked at public baths.

=== Vianstown ===
Located about 2 kilometers south-southwest of Downpatrick, the 62-acre estate in Ballyvange townland is rich in history and heritage. The land, which includes a cluster of houses and farmland, was once part of a larger estate owned by the Earl of Ardglass in the 17th century. In 1669, it was leased to John Treanor, Esq., and Roger West, Esq.

Lieutenant Roger West (d. 1644), a significant figure in the area’s early history, held several important roles, including High Sheriff of Down in 1610 and Member of Parliament for Downpatrick in 1613. He arrived in Ireland from England as a lieutenant under Lord Cromwell. Thomas Cromwell, who purchased the Downpatrick estate around 1604 and later became the Earl of Ardglass in 1645, had a close relationship with West. This connection is documented in Cromwell’s will. In recognition of his service, Cromwell granted him the village and townland of Ballydugan in 1626, followed by additional lands in Vianstown and Drumcullen in 1634. The Vianstown land was historically referred to as "Kingsfield."

Vianstown itself was a small hamlet near the western edge of Ballyvange. According to John O'Donovan, writing in the Ordnance Survey Name Books, the name "Ballyvange" may derive from the family name "Veanes," with "Vianstown" possibly being a variation of the same name. This suggests that the two names may refer to the same general area.

One of the properties in the area was Vianstown House (Reference D 35 in the Northern Ireland Heritage Gardens Inventory), located about two miles southwest of Downpatrick. Though the original house, which predates 1834, no longer stands, the site contains mature trees, a walled garden and a pond.

On 9 August 1879, a powerful thunderstorm struck the area. Lightning hit the residence of a Mr. Reid, causing considerable damage.

Vianstown cottage was also located near Vianstown House in Ballyvange.

The Irish version of the name is based on what the surname Veanes or Vian might have looked like if it had been turned into Irish a long time ago. However, even though Down District Council once used the Irish name Arda Bhaile na bhFiann for Vianstown Heights, there’s no real evidence to support that this is the correct or original Irish version.

== Geography ==
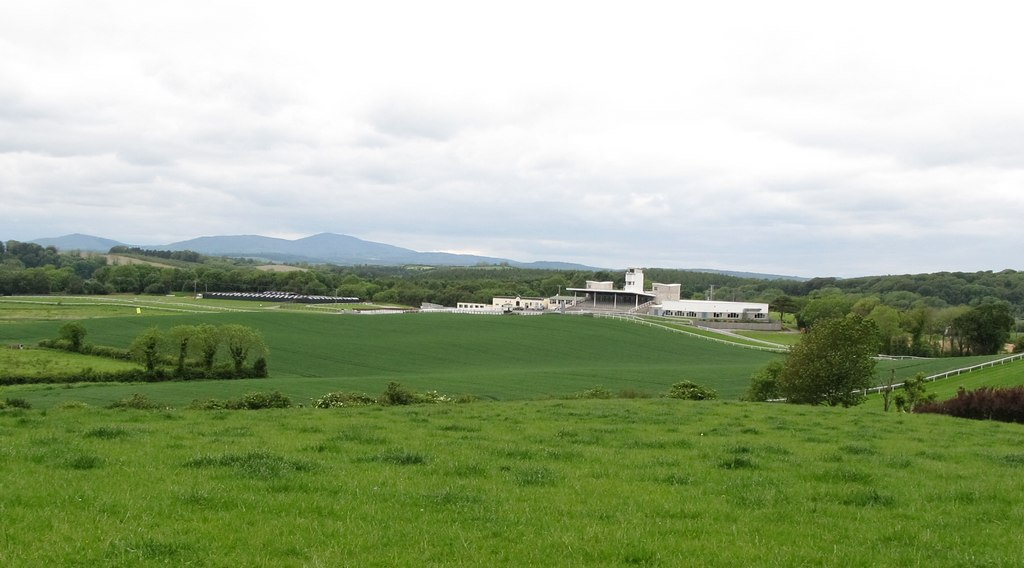
Downpatrick Racecourse from the Vianstown Road in Ballyvange

Townlands that border Ballyvange include:

- Demesne of Down to the north
- Ballymote Upper to the east
- Ballymote Middle to the east
- Ballymote Lower to the east
- Quarter Cormick to the west
- Marshallstown to the south
