= Drumgath =

Civil parish in County Down, Northern Ireland

Coordinates: 54.128°N 6.127°W

Drumgath is a civil parish in County Down, Northern Ireland, southwest of Rathfriland. It is situated in the historic barony of Iveagh Upper, Upper Half. It is also a townland of 375 acres.

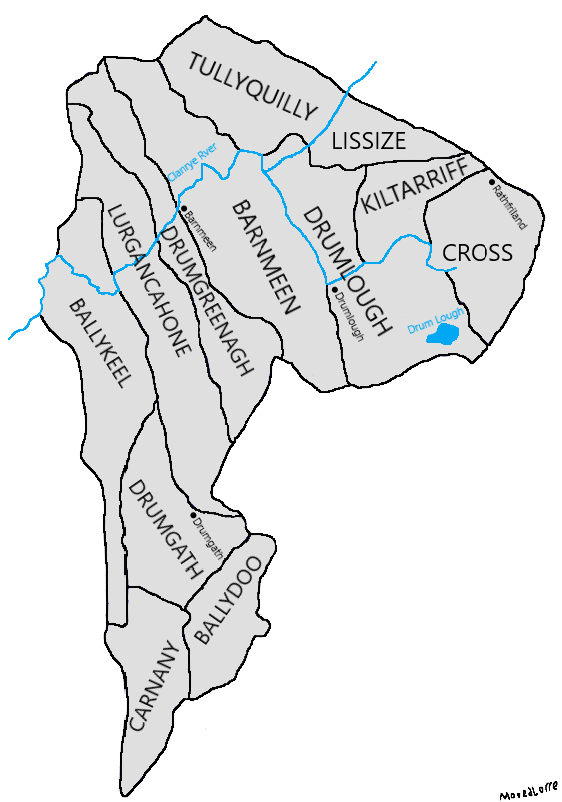
A map of the civil parish of Drumgath

== Settlements ==
The civil parish contains the following settlements:

- Barnmeen
- Drumgath
- Drumlough
- Rathfriland

== Townlands ==
The civil parish contains the following townlands:

- Ballydoo
- Ballykeel
- Barnmeen
- Carnany
- Cross
- Drumgath
- Drumgreenagh
- Drumlough
- Kiltarriff
- Lissize
- Lurgancahone
- Tullyquilly

== See also ==
- List of civil parishes of County Down
