= Blaris =

Blaris: Irish: Bláras
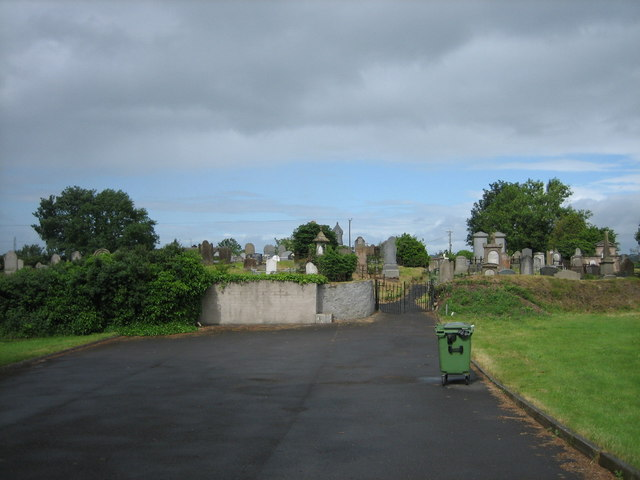
- Blaris old burial ground in 2006
- County: County Down and County Antrim
- Country: Northern Ireland
- Sovereign state: United Kingdom
- Postcode district: BT
- Dialling code: 028

Blaris (from Irish Bláras, meaning 'a field') is a civil parish covering areas of both County Antrim and County Down, Northern Ireland. It is situated in the historic baronies of Castlereagh Upper and Iveagh Lower, Upper Half in County Down and Massereene Upper in County Antrim. It is also a townland of 543 acres, which contains the site of the Blaris medieval parish church, and is on the south-east side of the River Lagan, adjacent to Lisburn.

== History ==
In the 1306 Papal Taxation the church is recorded as Ecclesia de Blaris. In 1605 the townland of Blaris is recorded as Ballytempleblarisse, (from Irish Baile Teampall Blárais, meaning 'the townland of the church of Blaris'). In the mid-19th century the antiquarian William Reeves noted that very little of the church was intact, although the graveyard remained.

Blaris old burial ground is in the townland of Blaris and is reputed to have had a church in mediaeval times. The oldest gravestone dates from 1626. Some of those who took part in the Irish Rebellion of 1798 were executed outside the graveyard and are buried in an unmarked plot.

== Settlements ==
The civil parish contains the following settlements:

- Lisburn
- Lurganure
- Maze
- Ravernet

== Townlands ==
The civil parish contains the following townlands:

- Aghnatrisk
- Annacloy
- Ballintine
- Ballykeel Edenagonnell
- Ballymullan
- Blaris
- Broughmore
- Carnbane
- Carnreagh
- Culcavy
- Drumatihugh
- Duneight
- Gortnacor
- Knockmore
- Largymore
- Lisnagarvy
- Lisnatrunk
- Lisnoe
- Lissue (also known as Teraghafeeva)
- Lurganure
- Magherageery
- Maze
- Old Warren
- Ravernet
- Taghnabrick
- Teraghafeeva (also known as Lissue)
- Tonagh

== See also ==
- List of civil parishes of County Down
