= Aughnacloy, County Down =

Townland in County Tyrone, Northern Ireland

Aughnacloy: Irish: Áth na Cloiche
- County: County Down
- Country: Northern Ireland
- Sovereign state: United Kingdom

Aughnacloy (from Irish Áth na Cloiche, meaning 'ford of the stone') is a small townland of 115 acres in County Tyrone, Northern Ireland. It is situated in the civil parish of Annaclone and the historic barony of Iveagh Upper, Upper Half.
