= Ballylough =

Village in County Down, Northern Ireland

Coordinates: 54.267°N 5.933°W

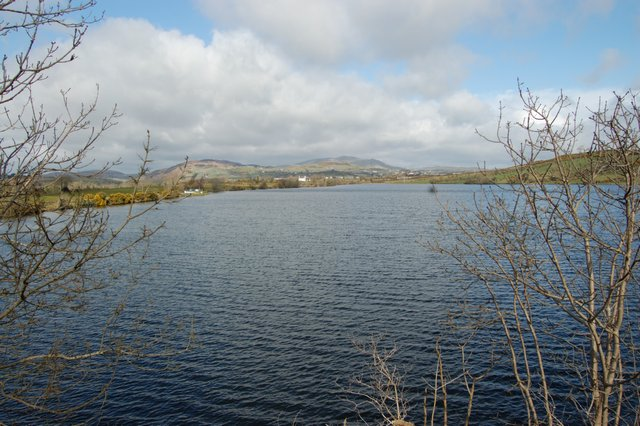
- Ballylough private fishing lough

- Location within County Down
- District: Down
- County: County Down
- Country: Northern Ireland
- Sovereign state: United Kingdom
- UK Parliament: South Down
- NI Assembly: South Down

Ballylough (Baile-an-locha; "the townland of the lake") is a small village and townland in County Down, Northern Ireland. It lies roughly 5 miles (8.0 km) north of Newcastle and just east of Castlewellan and northeast of Annsborough.

It is situated beside Ballylough Lake, popular for fishing for rainbow trout and run by Castlewellan and Annsborough Angling Club.
