= Angus Rock =

Skerry in Northern Ireland

Coordinates: 54°19′51″N 5°31′34″W

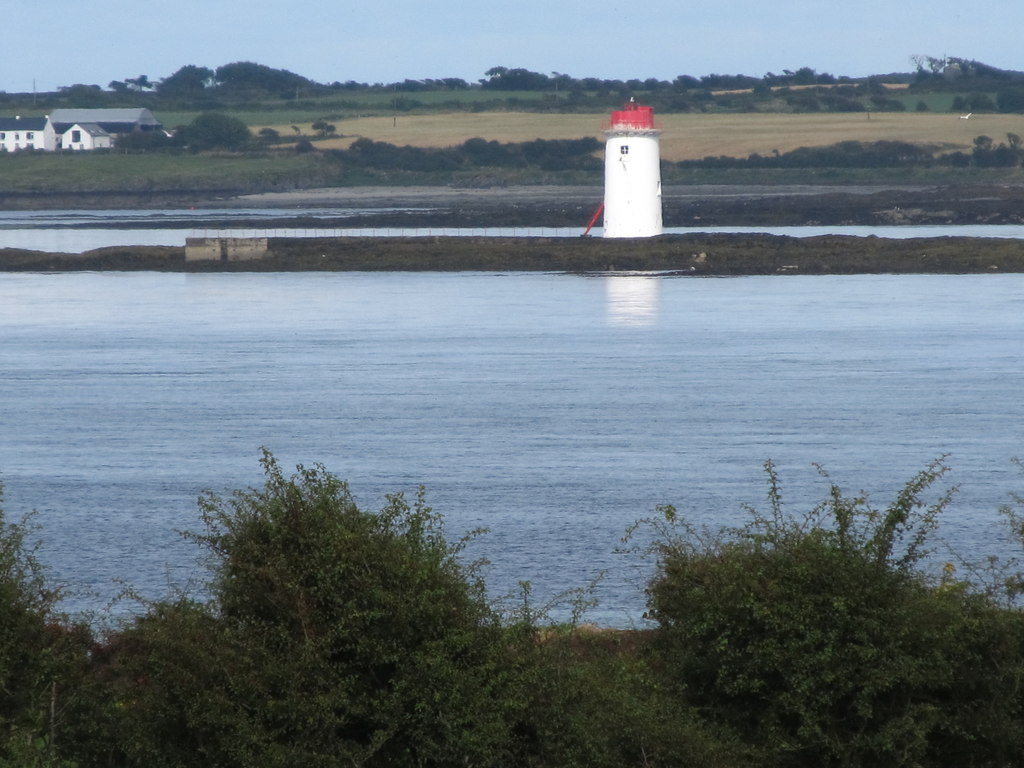
- Angus Rock from Killard Road

- Location within County Down
- County: County Down
- Country: Northern Ireland
- Sovereign state: United Kingdom
- Postcode district: BT
- Dialling code: 028

Angus Rock is a skerry off the coast of the Ards Peninsula it is located 0.9 miles east of Kilclief, County Down, Northern Ireland. It has an area of 0.4 acres (1.62 km^{2}). It is mainly known for its lighthouse, the lighthouse is 13 metres tall and has a range of 5 miles. The skerry is located at the entrance to Strangford Lough, and the channel to the west of the rock is shallow.

== History ==
In October 1715, the vessel Eagle’s Wing was blown ashore during a storm, with the loss of 76 lives. Following this disaster, a 30 feet high white painted stone beacon was built on Angus Rock in 1720, though no light was exhibited. Strangford Lough merchants pleaded for a light to be installed, and finally, following a petition in 1846, a perch was erected on St. Patrick’s Rock. Later that year, it was decided to build a new tower on Angus Rock, though still without exhibiting a light. The granite tower 40 feet high was built in 1853 but local merchants complained that it had been a waste of time and money building yet another unlit beacon. Shipwrecks continued, and in 1861 the brig Manchester was wrecked on Angus Rock, losing all on board. Had the beacon been lit, the inquest declared it this tragedy may have been avoided. Trade and vessels increased along this stretch of coast, and many more vessels were wrecked, and lives were lost, despite this, the beacon remained unlit.

In March 1969, the vessel Kingsgate ran aground on Angus Rock. Following this incident, the Commissioners of Irish Lights said they would consider providing a light on Angus Rock. Finally, in October 1978, the Bar Pladdy buoy was replaced with a light buoy. Subsequently, Angus Rock Lighthouse was lit on 7 April 1983. In July 2000 the light was converted to solar power with a character of flashing red every 5 second in hours of darkness only. It is now in the care of an attendant and monitored via a telemetry link from Irish Lights in Dún Laoghaire. The Angus Tower was affectionately referred to by these sailors as ‘The Rocking Goose’.
