= Maze (electoral ward) =

Coordinates: 54.488°N 6.123°W

Maze: Irish: an Mhaigh
- Location within Northern Ireland
- Population: 3,393 (2001 Census)
- District: Lisburn and Castlereagh
- County: County Down County Antrim
- Country: Northern Ireland
- Sovereign state: United Kingdom
- Post town: LISBURN
- Postcode district: BT27, BT28
- Dialling code: 028
- UK Parliament: Lagan Valley
- NI Assembly: Lagan Valley

Maze is an electoral ward (and a townland) in the Lisburn and Castlereagh City Council (formerly Lisburn City Council) area of Northern Ireland. It predominantly lies in County Down although its northwestern corner lies in County Antrim, the division being the River Lagan. The Maze electoral ward consists of the settlements of Mazetown, Long Kesh, Culcavy, Aghnatrisk, Halftown and Ravernet. In 2001, there were 3393 residents in the electoral ward.

== Mazetown and Long Kesh ==
Mazetown is a small settlement just off the main A3 Belfast-Armagh road, some 3 miles west of Lisburn.

Long Kesh is most famous for the Maze Prison (closed in 2000), which was sited on an aircraft field known as 'Long Kesh'. The prison entrance was on the Culcavy Road in Halftown. Long Kesh is also known for Down Royal Racecourse, which is the main attraction in the area, as well as the adjoining nine-hole and eighteen-hole Down Royal Golf Course. The area had 351 residents in the 2001 Census.

== Transport and Communications ==
The main A1 Belfast-Dublin dual-carriageway splits the ward as it ascends from the Sprucefield Roundabout (M1 junctions 7/8) to the Hillsborough roundabout, on a section commonly known as Carnbane Hill, named after the townland it passes through.

For almost eighty years, the area was served by trains at Maze station, which was originally opened by the Great Northern Railway (Ireland) in 1895. The station finally closed in 1974.

As with the rest of the province, the telephone dialing code is '028'. However, the electoral ward covers three local exchange areas (all of which lie within the Lisburn telephone area). The western side is covered by the 'Maze' exchange (9262xxxx), the centre-north area by the Lisburn central exchange (926xxxxx) and the eastern and southern areas by the 'Hillsborough' exchange (9268xxxx).

== Sport ==
Lower Maze F.C. play in the Mid-Ulster Football League.

== Demographics ==
This data covers the whole electoral ward, not just the traditional Maze settlement. On Census day (29 April 2001) there were 3353 people living in the Maze electoral ward. Of these:

- 22.9% were aged under 16 years and 15.6% were aged 60 and over
- 50.8% were female and 49.2% were male
- 89.1% were from a Protestant background and 6.2% were from a Catholic background
- 1.9% of people aged 16–74 were unemployed
