= Drumlough, Rathfriland =

Village in County Down, Northern Ireland

Coordinates: 54.219°N 6.179°W

Drumlough (Irish: Druim Loch) is a village/townland in County Down, Northern Ireland, southwest of Rathfriland, and is located in the civil parish of Drumgath.

Drumlough Highland Pipe Band was formed in 1942 and although no longer competing in RSPBA competition level, some of its members play for other bands at Grades 2 and 4.

Drumlough Lake is a small fishery that is managed by Rathfriland Angling Club. The lake contains rainbow trout, pike, perch, rudd and European eel in the summer months. Specimen pike has been caught in recent seasons.

== See also ==
- List of villages in Northern Ireland
- List of towns in Northern Ireland
