= Annsborough =

Village in County Down, Northern Ireland

Coordinates: 54°15′47″N 5°55′31″W

Annsborough: Irish: Baile Anna
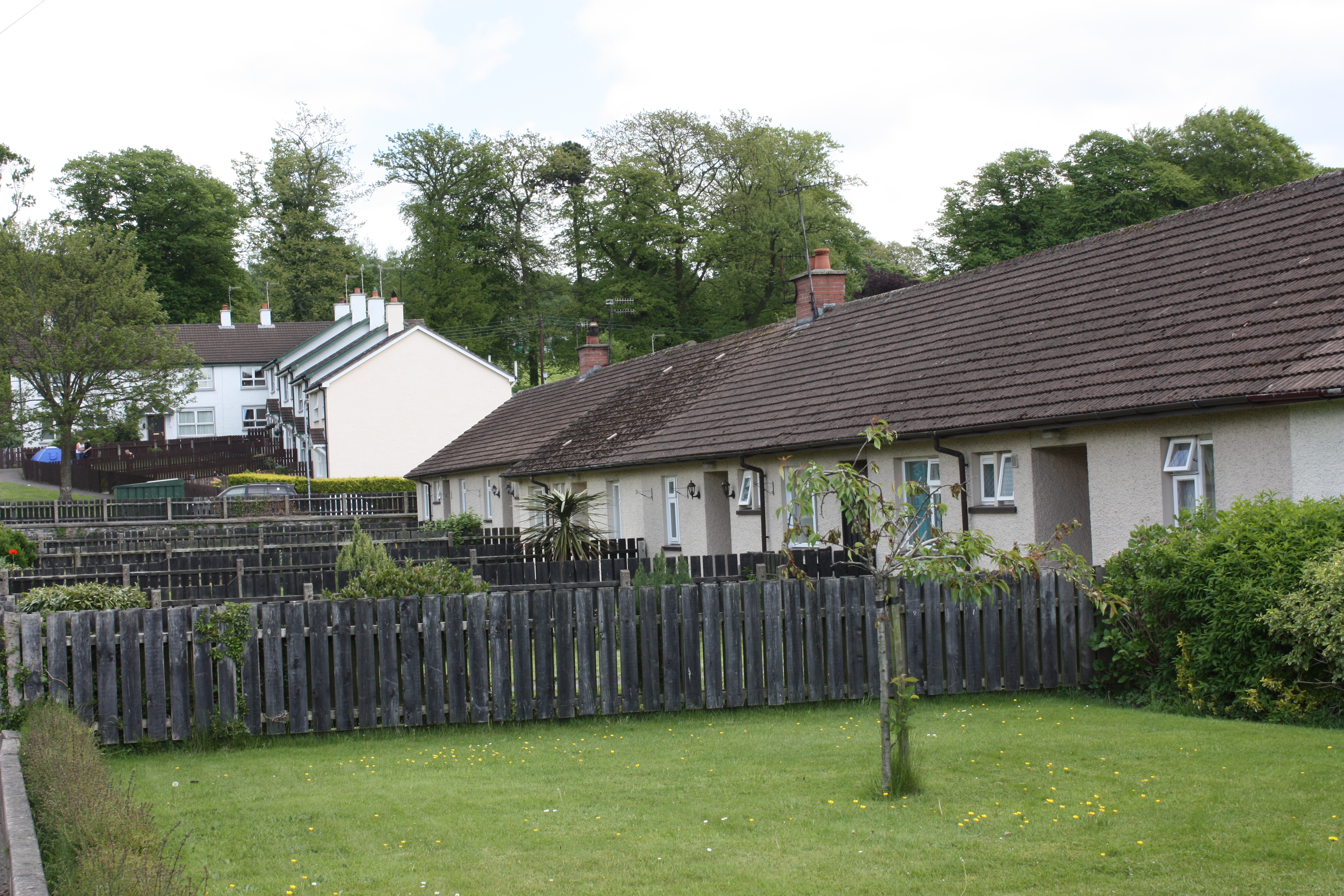
- Annsborough in May 2010

- Location within County Down
- Population: 793 (2021 census)
- District: Newry, Mourne and Down
- County: County Down
- Country: Northern Ireland
- Sovereign state: United Kingdom

Annsborough is a village in County Down which is one of the main residential areas in Castlewellan, Northern Ireland. It is situated on the A25 road between Downpatrick and Newry, about 0.8 kilometres to the east of Castlewellan and 17 kilometres to the south west of Downpatrick. It had a population of 793 in the 2021 census. The village is situated within the Mourne Area of Outstanding Natural Beauty.

== History ==
Annsborough Primary School first opened in 1835, making it one of the oldest functional schools in the country. The school officially became integrated in 1997.

== Culture ==
The village is the home of the Annsborough Pipe Band. The band, which has competed at Grade 3A of the Royal Scottish Pipe Band Association, won World Championships titles in 2004, 2005 and 2015. The band's drum corps was also crowned World Champions in 2007 and 2015.

The village is also home to Aughlisnafin GAC, it is the local GAA club and currently competes in Division 4 of the Down All County Gaelic Football League

== Demography ==
Annsborough is classified as a small village or hamlet by the Northern Ireland Statistics and Research Agency (NISRA) (i.e. with population of less than 1,000). On census day in 2001, 29 April 2001, there were 593 people living in Annsborough. Of these:

- 29.4% were aged under 16 years and 13.6% were aged 60 and over
- 48.7% of the population were male and 51.3% were female
- 93.6% were from a Catholic background and 5.1% were from a Protestant background
- 5.8% of people aged 16–74 were unemployed

== See also ==
- List of villages in Northern Ireland
- List of towns in Northern Ireland
