= Iveagh Upper, Upper Half =

Barony in County Down, Northern Ireland

Iveagh Upper, Upper Half Uíbh Eachach Uachtarach, An Leath Uachtair(Irish)
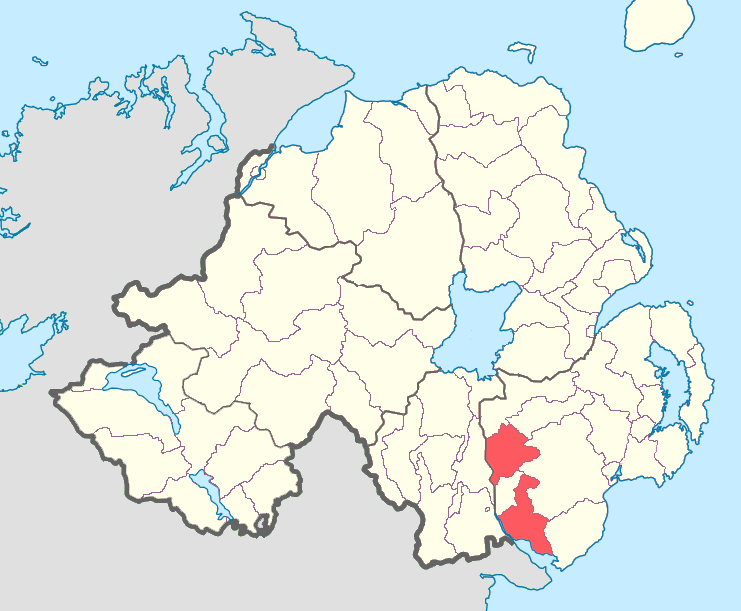
- Location of Iveagh Upper, Upper Half, County Down, Northern Ireland.
- Sovereign state: United Kingdom
- Country: Northern Ireland
- County: Down

Iveagh Upper, Upper Half is the name of a barony in County Down, Northern Ireland. It was created by 1851 with the division of the barony of Iveagh Upper into two. It lies to the west and south of the county, split in half by the Lordship of Newry. It is bordered by six other baronies: Mourne to the south; Iveagh Upper, Lower Half to the east; Iveagh Lower, Lower Half and Iveagh Lower, Upper Half to the north; and Orior Lower and Orior Upper to the west.

== List of settlements ==
Below is a list of the villages and population centres in Iveagh Upper, Upper Half:

=== Towns ===
- Banbridge
- Warrenpoint

=== Villages ===
- Loughbrickland
- Poyntzpass (split with Orior Lower)
- Rathfriland
- Rostrevor

=== Hamlets and population centres ===
- Annaclone
- Ballinaskeagh
- Burren
- Donaghmore
- Drumgath
- Killowen
- Scarva

== List of civil parishes ==
Below is a list of civil parishes in Iveagh Upper, Upper Half:

- Aghaderg (also partly in barony of Iveagh Lower, Lower Half (two townlands) and Iveagh Upper, Lower Half (one townland))
- Annaclone
- Clonallan
- Clonduff (one townland, rest in barony of Iveagh Upper, Lower Half)
- Donaghmore (also partly in barony of Iveagh Lower, Upper Half (two townlands))
- Drumgath
- Kilbroney (also partly in barony of Iveagh Upper, Lower Half (one townland))
- Kilcoo (one townland, rest in barony of Iveagh Upper, Lower Half)
- Moira (one townland, rest in barony of Iveagh Lower, Upper Half)
- Seapatrick (also partly in baronies of Iveagh Lower, Lower Half and Iveagh Lower, Upper Half)
- Warrenpoint
