= Newry (civil parish) =

Administrative area in County Down, Northern Ireland

Newry is a civil parish in County Armagh and County Down, Northern Ireland. It is situated in the historic baronies of Iveagh Upper, Lower Half (one townland) and Lordship of Newry in County Down and the baronies of Orior Upper and Oneilland West (two townlands) in County Armagh.

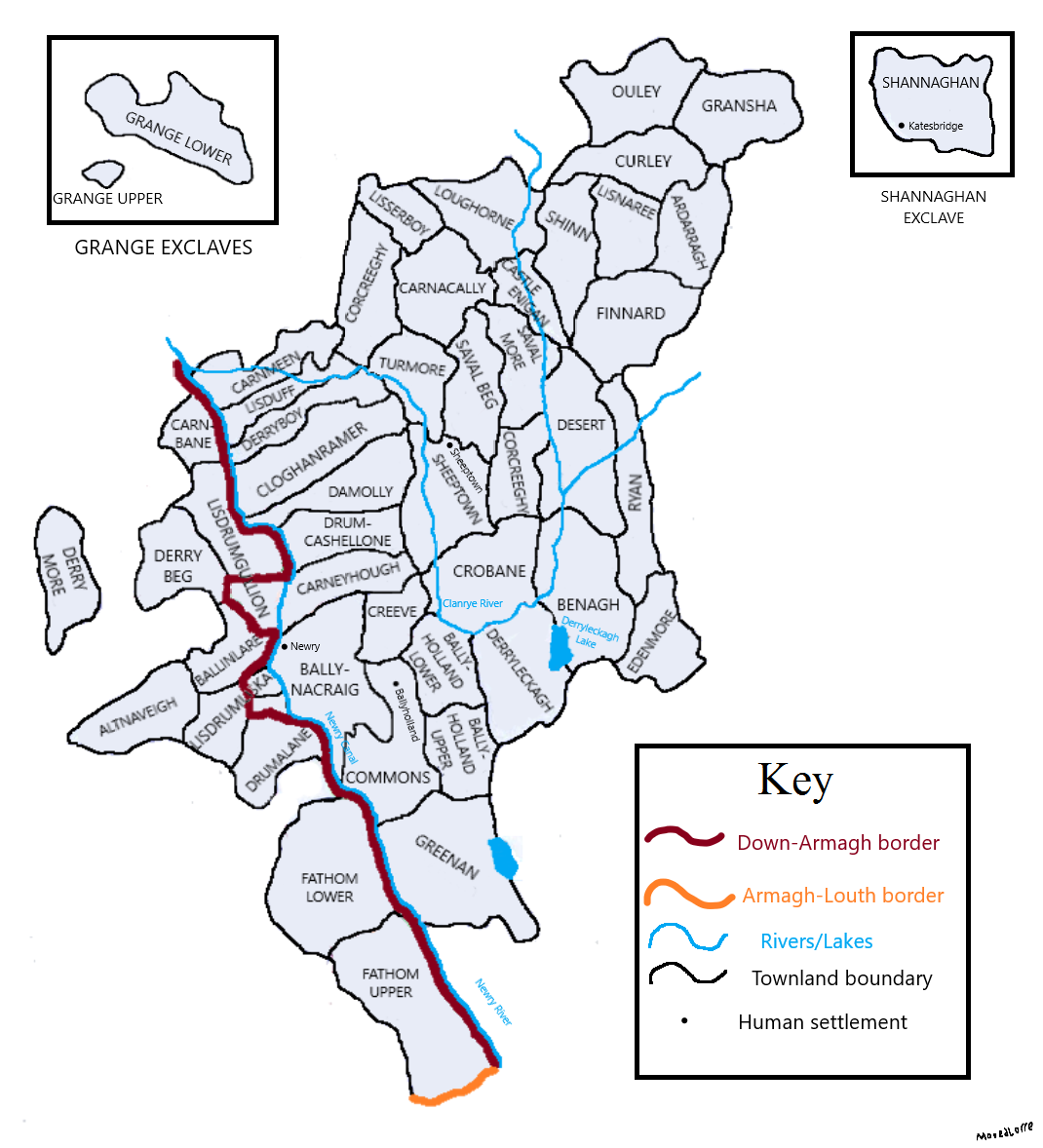
A map of the Newry Civil Parish, containing the Grange and Shannaghan exclaves.

== Settlements ==
The townland contains the following settlements:

- Newry
- Sheeptown
- Ballyholland
- Katesbridge

== Townlands ==
Newry civil parish contains the following townlands:

- Altnaveigh
- Ardarragh
- Ballinlare
- Ballyholland Lower
- Ballyholland Upper
- Ballynacraig
- Benagh
- Carnacally
- Carnbane
- Carneyhough
- Carnmeen
- Castle Enigan
- Cloghanramer
- Commons
- Corcreeghy
- Creeve
- Crobane
- Croreagh
- Curley
- Damolly
- Derry Beg
- Derry More
- Derryboy
- Derryleckagh
- Desert
- Drumalane
- Drumcashellone
- Edenmore
- Fathom Lower
- Fathom Upper
- Finnard
- Grange Lower
- Grange Upper
- Gransha
- Greenan
- Lisdrumgullion
- Lisdrumliska
- Lisduff
- Lisnaree
- Lisserboy
- Loughorne
- Ouley
- Ryan
- Saval Beg
- Saval More
- Shannaghan
- Sheeptown
- Shinn
- Turmore

== See also ==
- List of civil parishes of County Down
