= Iveagh (disambiguation) =

Iveagh is the name of several historical territorial divisions in what is now County Down, Northern Ireland.

Iveagh may also refer to:

== Places ==
- Iveagh (Northern Ireland Parliament constituency), based on the baronies
- Baronies of Ireland
  - Iveagh Lower, Lower Half
  - Iveagh Lower, Upper Half
  - Iveagh Upper, Lower Half
  - Iveagh Upper, Upper Half
- Mount Iveagh, Antarctica

== People ==
- Earl of Iveagh, a British peerage of the Guinness family
- Viscount Magennis of Iveagh, an Irish Peerage title 1623–93

== Other uses ==
- Iveagh House, Dublin HQ of the Irish Department of Foreign Affairs
- Iveagh Primary School, in Rathfriland, County Down
- Iveagh Grounds, a sports ground in Dublin
- Iveagh Market, Dublin
- Iveagh Trust, a housing association
- Iveagh United F.C., Dunmurry

== See also ==
- Uí Echach Cobo, the clan from whose name Iveagh derives
