= List of civil parishes of County Down =

In Ireland, Counties are divided into civil parishes which are sub-divided into townlands. The following is a list of civil parishes in County Down, Northern Ireland:

== A ==
Aghaderg, Annaclone, Annahilt, Ardglass, Ardkeen, Ardquin

== B ==
Ballee, Ballyculter, Ballykinler, Ballyphilip, Ballytrustan, Ballywalter, Bangor, Blaris, Bright

== C ==
Castleboy, Clonallan, Clonduff, Comber

== D ==
Donaghadee, Donaghcloney, Donaghmore, Down, Dromara, Dromore, Drumballyroney, Drumbeg, Drumbo, Drumgath, Drumgooland, Dundonald, Dunsfort

== G ==
Garvaghy, Greyabbey

== H ==
Hillsborough, Holywood

== I ==
Inch, Inishargy

== K ==
Kilbroney, Kilclief, Kilcoo, Kilkeel, Killaney, Killinchy, Killyleagh, Kilmegan, Kilmood, Kilmore, Knockbreda

== L ==
Lambeg, Loughinisland

== M ==
Maghera, Magheradrool, Magheralin, Magherally, Moira

== N ==
Newry, Newtownards

== R ==
Rathmullan

== S ==
St. Andrews (alias Ballyhalbert), Saintfield, Saul, Seapatrick, Shankill, Slanes

== T ==
Tullylish, Tullynakill, Tyrella

== W ==
Warrenpoint, Witter

== See also ==
- List of townlands in County Down
