= Annaghmakeonan =

Townland in Northern Ireland

Coordinates: 54°23′57″N 6°15′53″W

Annaghmakeonan: Irish: Eanach Mhic Eoghanáin
- Location within County Down
- County: County Down
- Country: Northern Ireland
- Sovereign state: United Kingdom
- Postcode district: BT
- Dialling code: 028

Annaghmakeonan (from Irish Eanach Mhic Eoghanáin 'McOwenan’s marsh') is a rural townland in County Down, Northern Ireland. It has an area of 379.21 acres (1.54 km^{2}). It is situated in the civil parish of Donaghcloney and the historic barony of Iveagh Lower, Upper Half, located 3 miles north of Banbridge. It lies within the Lisburn and Castlereagh City Council.

== See also ==
- List of townlands in County Down
