= Annahunshigo =

Townland in Northern Ireland

Coordinates: 54°15′27″N 6°4′32″W

Annahunshigo: Irish: Eanach Uinseogach
- Location within County Down
- County: County Down
- Country: Northern Ireland
- Sovereign state: United Kingdom
- Postcode district: BT
- Dialling code: 028

Annahunshigo (from Irish Eanach Uinseogach 'ash-tree marsh') is a rural townland in County Down, Northern Ireland. It has an area of 555.9 acres (2.2495 km^{2}). It is situated in the civil parish of Drumballyroney and the historic barony of Iveagh Upper, Lower Half, located 4 miles east of Rathfriland. It lies within the Armagh City, Banbridge and Craigavon Borough Council.

== See also ==
- List of townlands in County Down
