= Moira, County Down (civil parish) =

Civil parish in County Down, Northern Ireland

Moira is a civil parish in County Down, Northern Ireland. It is mainly situated in the historic baronies of Iveagh Lower, Upper Half, with one townland in the barony of Iveagh Upper, Upper Half.

== Settlements ==
The civil parish contains the following settlements:

- Moira
- Lurganville

== Townlands ==
Magheralin civil parish contains the following townlands:

- Aughnadrumman
- Aughnafosker
- Balloonigan
- Ballycanal
- Ballygowan
- Ballyknock
- Ballymagaraghan
- Bottier
- Carnalbanagh East
- Carnalbanagh West
- Clare
- Derrydrummult
- Drumbane
- Gortnamony
- Kilminioge
- Legmore
- Lurganville
- Magherahinch
- Risk
- Tullyard
- Tullyloob

== See also ==
- List of civil parishes of County Down
