= Banbridge Junction Railway =

Railway line in Northern Ireland

- Banbridge, Newry, Dublin and Belfast Junction Railway
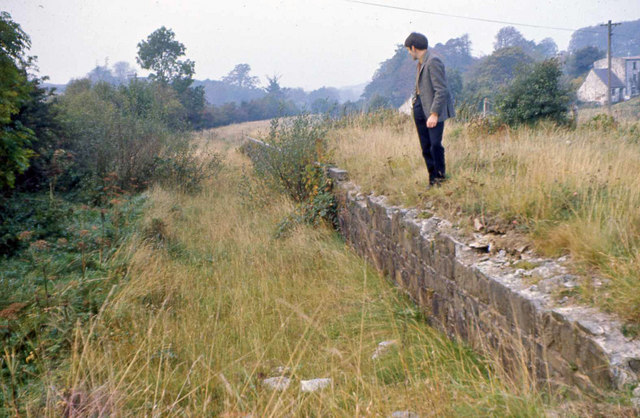
- A section of the former line, which closed in 1955, pictured near Lenaderg in 1969

Overview
- Dates of operation: 1859–1955
- Successor: Great Northern Railway (Ireland) (GNRI)

Technical
- Track gauge: 5 ft 3 in (1,600 mm)
- Length: approx. 5 to 6 miles

The Banbridge Junction Railway was a railway line that operated between Banbridge, County Down and Scarva, County Armagh. Opened in 1859, it was absorbed into the Great Northern Railway of Ireland in 1887. The line closed in the 1950s.

== History ==
Banbridge Junction Railway Act 1853
- Act of Parliament
- Parliament of the United Kingdom
- Long title: An Act for making a Railway from Banbridge to join the Dublin and Belfast Junction Railway at Scarvagh.
- Citation: 16 & 17 Vict. c. ccviii

Dates
- Royal assent: 20 August 1853

Other legislation
- Repealed by: Banbridge Junction Railway Act 1856

Status: Repealed

Text of statute as originally enacted

Banbridge Junction Railway Act 1856
- Act of Parliament
- Parliament of the United Kingdom
- Long title: An Act for altering the Name of the Banbridge, Newry, Dublin, and Belfast Junction Railway Company to the Name "The Banbridge Junction Railway Company," for increasing their Capital and extending their Powers, and for other Purposes.
- Citation: 19 & 20 Vict. c. xxxiv

Dates
- Royal assent: 23 June 1856

Other legislation
- Repeals/revokes: Banbridge Junction Railway Act 1853

Text of statute as originally enacted

Banbridge Junction Railway (Lease) Act 1860
- Act of Parliament
- Parliament of the United Kingdom
- Long title: An Act to authorize the Lease of the Banbridge Junction Railway to the Dublin and Belfast Junction Railway Company; and for other Purposes.
- Citation: 23 & 24 Vict. c. lix

Dates
- Royal assent: 25 May 1860

Text of statute as originally enacted

The company that operated the railway line, initially named the Banbridge, Newry, Dublin and Belfast Junction Railway Company, was created by the Banbridge Junction Railway Act 1853 (16 & 17 Vict. c. ccviii). The initial shareholders of the company included several local mill owners and linen producers, such as Thomas Ferguson, John Smyth, Robert McClelland and William Waugh. The company was renamed, to the Banbridge Junction Railway Company, under the Banbridge Junction Railway Act 1856 (19 & 20 Vict. c. xxxiv).

Development of the line took place in the mid- to late-1850s, and railway engineers associated with the survey, design and construction work included James Price and William Dargan. The Banbridge Junction Railway (BJR) opened in 1859.

The line, which was approximately 5 miles in length, connected the Banbridge Railway with the Dublin and Belfast Junction Railway. It served several mills, which were involved in producing Irish linen, along the River Bann near Banbridge.

The BJR was absorbed into the Great Northern Railway (Ireland) (GNRI) in 1877. The line closed in 1955.

== Stations ==
Stations and halts on the line included:

- Banbridge station (1859–1863); Replaced by the Banbridge, Lisburn and Belfast Railway station (1863–1956)
- Smyth's Siding passenger halt (c. 1903–1930s)
- Lenaderg station (1904–1955)
- Laurencetown station (1859–1955)
- Scarva station (terminus)
