= Annaghanoon =

Townland in Northern Ireland

Coordinates: 54°24′57″N 6°17′26″W

Annaghanoon: Irish: Eanach an Uain
- Location within County Down
- County: County Down
- Country: Northern Ireland
- Sovereign state: United Kingdom
- Postcode district: BT
- Dialling code: 028

Annaghanoon (from Irish Eanach an Uain 'marsh of the lamb') is a rural townland in County Down, Northern Ireland. It has an area of 626.03 acres (2.53 km^{2}). It is situated in the civil parish of Donaghcloney and the historic barony of Iveagh Lower, Upper Half, located 1 mile west of Donaghcloney. It lies within the Armagh City, Banbridge and Craigavon Borough Council.

== See also ==
- List of townlands in County Down
