= Tullylish =

Village in County Down, Northern Ireland

Coordinates: 54.374°N 6.345°W

Tullylish: Irish: Tulaigh Lis
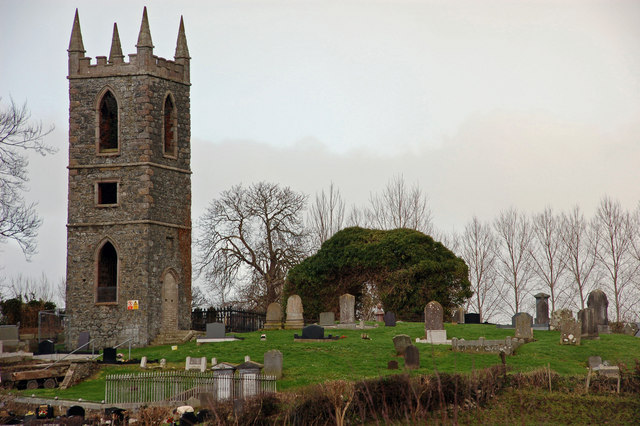
- Tullylish old church

- Location within County Down
- County: County Down
- Country: Northern Ireland
- Sovereign state: United Kingdom
- Postcode district: BT63
- Dialling code: 028

Tullylish (from Irish Tulaigh Lis, meaning 'hillock of the fort') is a small village, townland (of 513 acres) and civil parish in County Down, Northern Ireland. It sits on the River Bann, along the main road between the towns of Banbridge and Portadown. In the 2001 census it had a population of 105 people. It lies within the civil parish of Tullylish and Banbridge District.

== People ==
- John Butler Yeats (artist and writer, 1839–1922), father of William Butler Yeats and Jack Butler Yeats, was brought up in Tullylish at Vicarage Farm, Lawrencetown.
- Jeremy Irons (actor, b.1948); the BBC series Who Do You Think You Are? revealed that Jeremy Irons family originated from Tullylish Parish, Gilford.
- Jane Whiteside (1855–1875), New Zealand tightrope dancer, gymnast and magician, was born in Tullylish
- Rev. Arthur Connell (1821-1899), Church of Ireland priest served Tullylish before moving to St. Mark's where he and his daughter helped found what became Manchester City F.C.
- John O'Dowd (b.1967), Sinn Féin MLA for Upper Bann, has held ministerial positions in Northern Ireland, born in Tullylish

== Sport ==
Lawrencetown is home to Tullylish G.A.A club, which was originally known as 'St. Patrick's G.A.A Club' when it was formed in July 1944.

== Civil parish of Tullylish ==
The civil parish is mainly within the historic barony of Iveagh Lower, Upper Half with one townland (Tullyrain) in the barony of Iveagh Lower, Lower Half. It also contains the villages of Gilford, Lawrencetown and Bleary.

=== Townlands ===
The civil parish contains the following townlands:

- Ballydugan
- Ballymacanallen
- Ballynagarrick
- Bleary
- Clare
- Coose
- Drumaran
- Drumhorc
- Drummiller
- Drumnascamph
- Kernan
- Knocknagore
- Lenaderg
- Lisnafiffy
- Loughans
- Moyallan
- Mullabrack
- Tullylish
- Tullyrain

== See also ==
- List of civil parishes of County Down
- List of townlands in County Down
