= Ardgeehan =

Townland in Northern Ireland

Coordinates: 54°23′2″N 5°30′15″W

Ardgeehan: Irish: Ard Caocháin
- Location within County Down
- County: County Down
- Country: Northern Ireland
- Sovereign state: United Kingdom
- Postcode district: BT
- Dialling code: 028

Ardgeehan (from Irish Ard Caocháin 'Caochán’s height') is a rural townland in County Down, Northern Ireland. It has an area of 75.8 acres (0.307 km^{2}). It is situated in the civil parish of Ballyphilip and the historic barony of Ards Upper, located 1.5 miles east of Portaferry. It lies within the Ards and North Down.

== See also ==
- List of townlands in County Down
