= Dromore, County Down (civil parish) =

Civil parish in County Down, Northern Ireland

Dromore is a civil parish in County Down, Northern Ireland. It is situated mainly in the historic baronies of Iveagh Lower, Lower Half, with one townland in the barony of Iveagh Lower, Upper Half.

== Settlements ==
The civil parish contains the following settlements:

- Dromore
- Kinallen

== Townlands ==
Dromore civil parish contains the following townlands:

- Backnamullagh
- Balleny
- Ballykeel
- Ballymacormick
- Ballymaganlis
- Ballynaris
- Ballysallagh
- Ballyvicknacally
- Coolsallagh
- Drumaghadone
- Drumaknockan
- Drumbroneth
- Drumlough
- Drummiller
- Drumskee
- Edenordinary
- Edentiroory
- Edentrillick
- Ednego
- Greenan
- Greenoge
- Growell
- Islandderry
- Killysorrell
- Kinallen
- Lappoges
- Lisnaward
- Listullycurran
- Lurganbane
- Magherabeg
- Quilly
- Skeagh
- Skillyscolban
- Tullindoney
- Tullyglush
- Tullymacarath

== See also ==
- List of civil parishes of County Down
