= St. Andrews (alias Ballyhalbert) =

Civil parish on the Ards Peninsula, Northern Ireland

St. Andrews (alias Ballyhalbert) is a civil parish in County Down, Northern Ireland. It is situated in the historic barony of Ards Upper.

== Settlements ==
The civil parish contains the following village:

- Ballyhalbert
- Portavogie

== Townlands ==
The civil parish contains the following townlands:

- Ballyesborough
- Ballyfrench
- Ballygraffan
- Ballyhalbert
- Ballyhemlin
- Burial Island
- Echlinville
- Green Island
- Portavogie
- Roddans

== See also ==
- List of civil parishes of County Down
