= Garvaghy =

Garvaghy may refer to:

- Garvaghy (civil parish), a civil parish in County Down, Northern Ireland
- Garvaghey, a hamlet and townland in County Tyrone, Northern Ireland
