= Lisdrumliska =

Lisdrumliska (from Irish Lios Droim Loiscthe, meaning 'fort of the scorched ridge') is the name of two adjacent townlands which make up part of the Civil Parish of Newry. One townland is located in County Down, while the other, larger portion is in County Armagh.

The County Down portion is located in the Lordship of Newry while the County Armagh portion is located in the barony of Orior Upper.

== Notable features ==
- The Quays Shopping Centre
- Watson's Fort - a ringfort dated to the Early Christian Period
