= Ardquin =

Civil parish on the Ards Peninsula, Northern Ireland

Ardquin is a civil parish and townland (of 190 acres) in County Down, Northern Ireland. It is situated in the historic barony of Ards Upper. It lies within the Ards and North Down Borough Council.

== Townlands ==
Ardquin civil parish contains the following townlands:

- Ardquin
- Ballyhenry (from Irish Baile Héinrí 'Henry’s townland'): has an area of 214.5 acres (0.868 km^{2}), and is located 1.3 miles north-west of Portaferry (54°23′42″N 5°33′45″W).
- Ballyhenry Island
- Ballyherly
- Ballyminnish
- Ballymurphy
- Ballyridley
- Ballywaddan
- Ballywallon
- Ballywallon Island
- Ballywhite
- Demesne
- Marlfield
- Priest Town
- Thomastown

== See also ==
- List of civil parishes of County Down
