= Lawrencetown, County Down =

Village in United Kingdom

Coordinates: 54°22′46″N 6°18′29″W

Laurencetown: Irish: Baile Labhráis
- Location within County Down
- Population: 956 (2011 Census)
- County: County Down
- Country: Northern Ireland
- Sovereign state: United Kingdom
- Post town: Craigavon
- Postcode district: BT63
- Dialling code: +44
- Police: Northern Ireland
- Fire: Northern Ireland
- Ambulance: Northern Ireland
- UK Parliament: Upper Bann

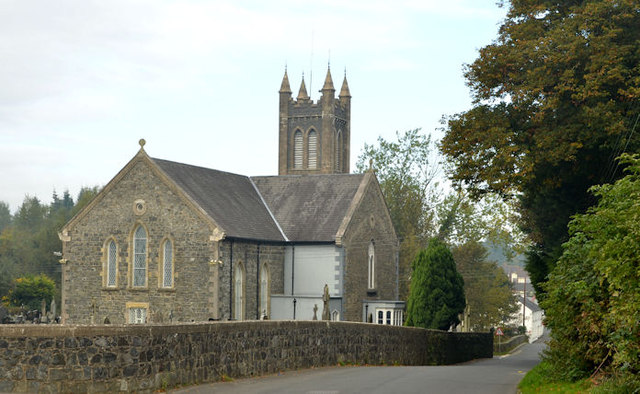
St Patrick's and St Colman's Church, Laurencetown In 2013

Laurencetown or Lawrencetown is a small village in County Down, Northern Ireland. It sits on the River Bann, along the main road between the towns of Banbridge and Portadown. It is within the parish of Tullylish and covers the townlands of Knocknagore and Drumnascamph. In the 2011 census it had a population of 956 people. In Irish, it is known as Baile Labhráis (Lawrence's Townland).

== Places of interest ==
Lawrencetown House, close to the village, was built before 1834 and features a walled garden and extensive lawns stretching to the River Bann.

Lawrenctown park, between the Federal Tyres and Nearby Lawrenctown.

== People ==
- John Butler Yeats (1839-1922), an Irish artist and the father of William Butler Yeats and Jack Butler Yeats, was born here
- Lawrencetown was also the birthplace of William Dawson Lawrence (1817-1886), a successful shipbuilder, businessman and politician in Canada, who is reported to have built the largest wooden ship in the world in 1874

== Demographics ==
- 956 Population [2011] – Census
- 0.3717 km^{2} Area
- 2,572/km^{2} Population Density
- 4.3% Annual Population Change [2001 → 2011]

Country of Birth (C 2011)

- Northern Ireland 887
- Great Britain 29
- Republic of Ireland 21
- EU (other) 5
- Other country 9

Ethnic Group (C 2011)

- White 948
- Asian 2
- Mixed/multiple 1

Religion (C 2011)

- Roman Catholic 703
- Christian (other) 141
- Other religion 11
- No religion 34

Main Language (C 2011)

- English 895
- Polish 1
- Other language 4

== Transport ==
Laurencetown had its own railway station from 1859 until 1955. The Laurencetown railway station opened on 23 March 1859. This Station acted as a stop between Banbridge (BJR) and Scarva until 1863 as Banbridge (BJR) railway station was closed in favour of the new Banbridge (BLBR) railway station. The Railway service resumed from Banridge with the opening of the Banbridge (BLBR) on 13 July 1863. On 1 January 1904 a new station between Banbridge and Laurencetown opened at Lenaderg. Laurencetown Railway Station Closed on 2 May 1955 as the Northern Irish Government Forced to Great Northern Railway of Ireland to close many of its stations as the Northern Irish Government wished to move away from Rail to invest more in roads.

== Education ==
- St. Colman's Primary School: Founded in the 20th century

== Sport ==
- Lawrencetown is home to Tullylish GAA club, which was formed in July 1944 and originally called 'St Patrick's GAA club'
- Tullylish Running Club: Formed in 2017 by Shauna Corbett
- Lawrencetown also had a football team called "Lawrencetown Celtic" c.1920

== See also ==
- List of villages in Northern Ireland
- List of towns in Northern Ireland
