= Donaghcloney =

Village in County Down, Northern Ireland

Coordinates: 54.419979°N 6.260319°W

Donaghcloney: Irish: Domhnach Cluana
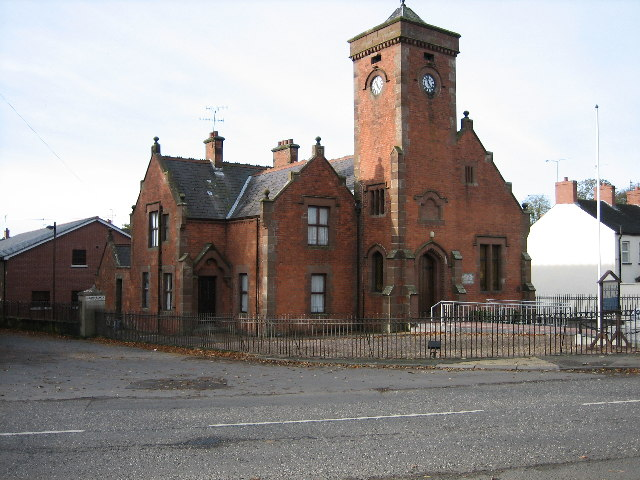
- St Patrick's church

- Location within County Down
- Population: 1,977 (2021 Census)
- Irish grid reference: J129537
  - Belfast: 23 mi (37 km)
- District: Armagh City, Banbridge and Craigavon
- County: County Down
- Country: Northern Ireland
- Sovereign state: United Kingdom
- Post town: CRAIGAVON
- Postcode district: BT66
- Dialling code: 028
- UK Parliament: Upper Bann
- NI Assembly: Upper Bann

Donaghcloney or Donacloney (from Irish Domhnach Cluana, meaning 'church of the meadow') is a village, townland (of 300 acres) and civil parish in County Down, Northern Ireland. It lies on the River Lagan between Lurgan and Dromore. In the 2021 census the village had a population of 1,977. It is colloquially referred to as "The 'Cloney" by locals.

== History ==
=== Early history ===
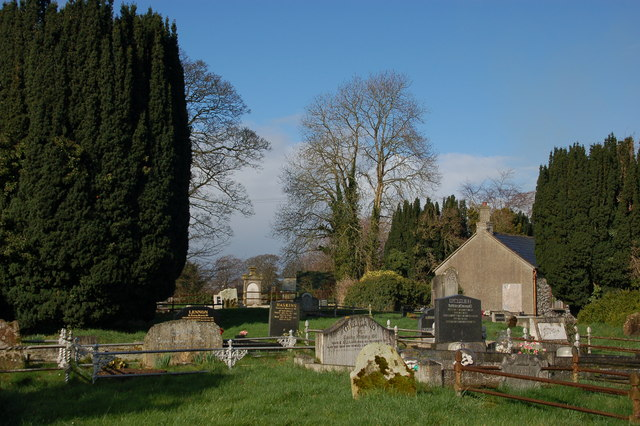
The old graveyard where the parish church was originally established.

Donaghcloney was reputedly established by Saint Patrick whilst travelling from Saul to Armagh sometime in the 5th century CE. A parish church was established overlooking the River Lagan, in what is today the village graveyard.

One of the first recorded mention of the village's name was in papal registers dated to 1422 as Domhnachcluana. The spelling changed frequently throughout the Middle Ages, during which time a new bell was installed in the parish church. The parish church suffered damage during the 1641 Rebellion and the Cromwellian campaign in Ireland. During the Williamite War in Ireland, Donaghcloney was the site of a clash between forces belonging to Frederick Schomberg and King James II. During this battle the parish church bell was thrown into the River Lagan. In the early 1800s it was recovered and installed in a church in nearby Waringstown.

=== Linen Industry ===
Donaghcloney is a typical Ulster village and has been linked to the Irish linen industry since at least 1742. By 1840 Donaghcloney boasted a large bleaching green which was turning out 8000 pieces of fabric annually. In 1866, William Liddell founded his linen company, headquartered at a new factory in Donaghcloney. William Liddell & Co. became the largest Jacquard weaving company in Ireland. At one point the company also owned a smaller mill at Banoge, on the outskirts of the village.

Donaghcloney grew during this time due to the employment created by Liddell's factory as well as his philanthropic efforts. The company provided housing for its workers and in 1877 established the Factory Society for the Sick to help its employees' families cover funeral costs. It also built a church, a school, and a cricket pitch.

By the 1900s the company was the largest producer of Damask Linen in the world and its products were being used in hotels and ocean liners across Europe. Notably, the linen used onboard RMS Titanic was produced in Donaghcloney. During the First and Second World War, Donaghcloney Linen Factory served the war effort through production of airplane coverings, parachute harnesses, bullets, and munitions.

In 1973 William Liddell & Co. merged with its long-time rival, William Ewart and Sons (founded in Belfast in 1814), forming the Ewart Liddell Company. Donaghcloney Linen Factory continued production, and its products were used by Bloomingdale's, Harrods, Emirates, Qantas, the Savoy, and The Ritz. It also supplied napkins and cushion covers for Concorde planes and airport lounges.

By 2000, the company's fortunes had changed and the Donaghcloney Linen Factory was outdated and in need of expensive modernisation. In 2001, it was acquired by the Baird McNutt Group, who closed the Donaghcloney Factory the following year. The factory lay derelict until the early 2010s, when it was demolished leaving only the chimney.

Donaghcloney Linen Factory before demolition in the early 2010s

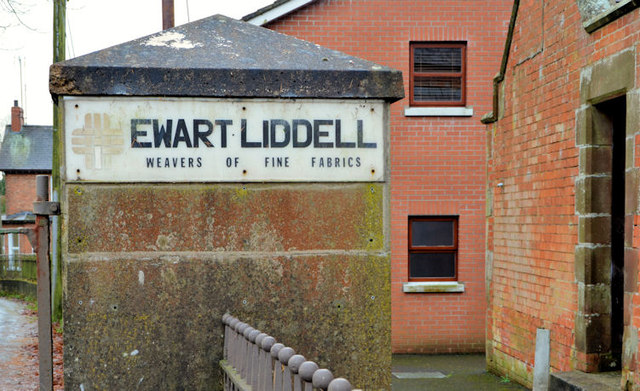

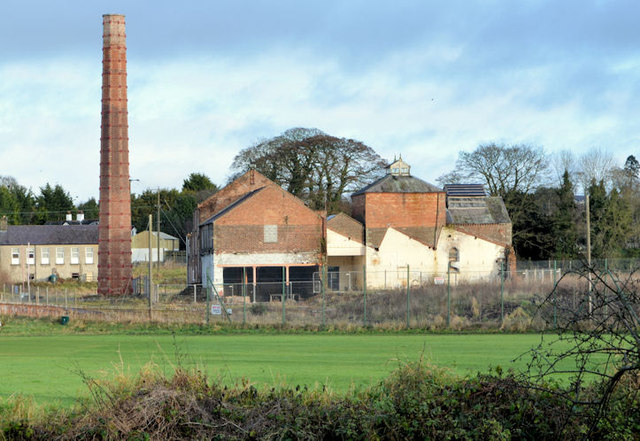

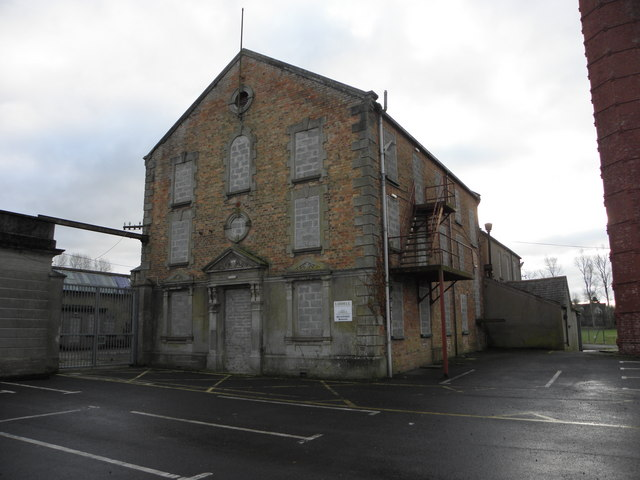

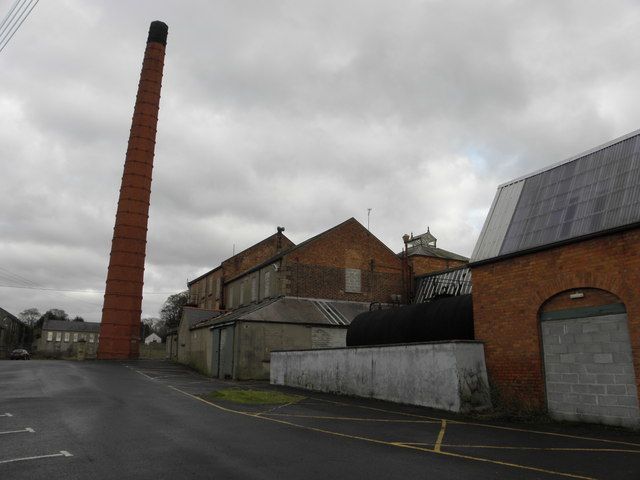

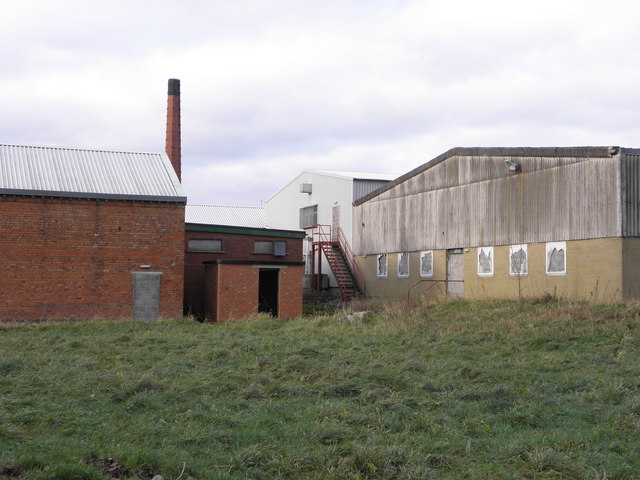

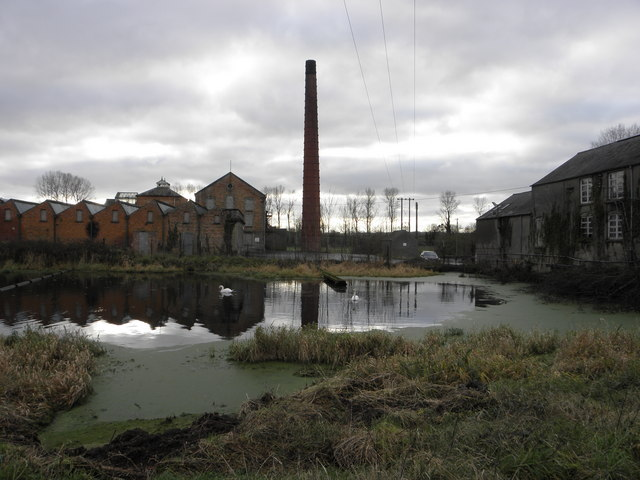

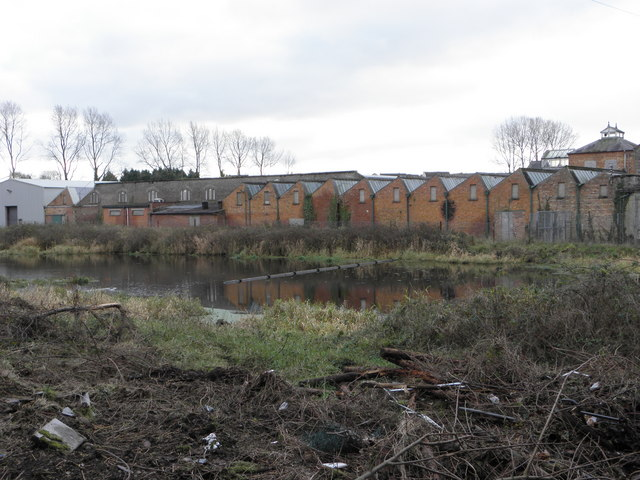

== Amenities and services ==
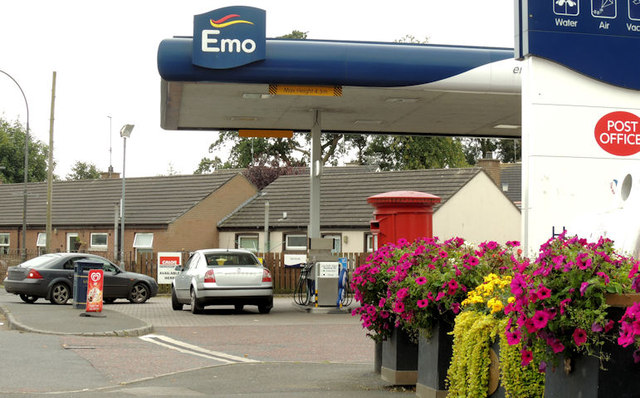
The petrol station

Donaghcloney has a Nisa shop and petrol station, a Post Office, a primary school, a children's play-park, a chippy, a Chinese takeaway, an off license, a pharmacist, a hairdresser, a butcher, and a café.

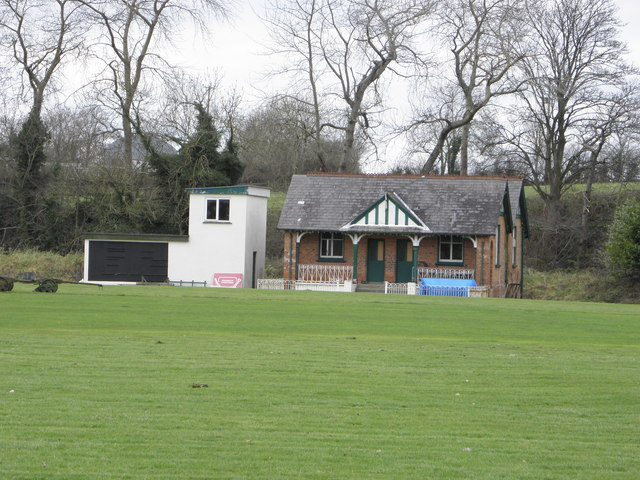
The Cricket Pavilion

There are Methodist, Elim Pentecostal, Church of Ireland, and Presbyterian churches as well as a Gospel Hall, Orange Hall, and a Royal British Legion.

=== Sport ===
The village has a history of cricket playing over many generations with the Donaghcloney Mill Cricket Club, founded in 1888. The club is based in a B2-listed Edwardian cricket pavilion, located in the grounds of the former factory.

Donacloney Football Club, founded in 1890, have two men's teams both playing in the Mid-Ulster Football League. The club's home pitch is in the village alongside the River Lagan.

=== Education ===
Donacloney Primary School is the only educational establishment in the village, catering for approximately 280 pupils. The teachers of date (2026) were, Mr Orr P7, Mr Teggart P7, Mr Neill P6, Mrs Hamill P6, Mrs Vaughn P5, Mrs Cousins P4, Mrs Paul P3, Mrs Wright P2/3, Mrs Burrows P2/ Nursery, Mrs Baxter P1/3, Mrs McCrory P1, Mrs Castles Nursery, and Mrs Nesbitt Principal. It was formed in 1979 to replace three smaller local schools, formerly located at Fortescue, Blackskull, and Liddell.

The nearest secondary schools are Banbridge High School, Banbridge Academy, Lurgan Junior High School, and Dromore High School.

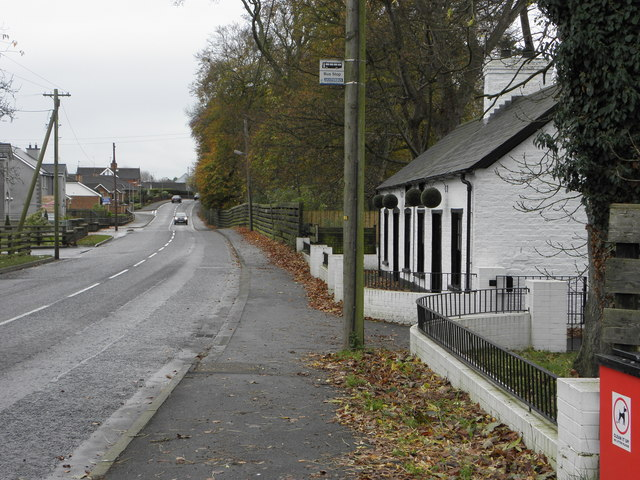
The main road through the village

=== Transport ===
Donaghcloney is served by the Ulsterbus route 56, linking the village with Lurgan and Banbridge. It is situated on the B9 Road, connecting it with nearby Moira, as well as Dromore via the B2 and Lurgan and Banbridge via the A26.

The nearest railway stations are Moira and Lurgan, both around 6 miles away on the Belfast - Dublin mainline. Until 1956, the nearest station was Mullafernaghan on the Great Northern Railway's line from Lisburn to Newcastle via Banbridge.

=== Clubs and activities ===
Donaghcloney has many clubs for both adults and children of which include: 1st Donacloney Guides, Girl's Brigade, Boy's Brigade, D'cloney Lil Library book club, Cadets, St Patricks Bowling club, Donaghcloney F.C, Donaghcloney Rural Needs Development Group, many music teachers and many youth groups.

== Demographics ==
Donaghcloney is classified as a small village by the Northern Ireland Statistics and Research Agency (NISRA).

| Census Year | Total Population | Age (%) | | Sex (%) | | Religious background (%) | | | | Unemployed (%) | Sources |
| Census Year | Total Population | Aged under 16 | Aged over 60 | Male | Female | Protestant | Catholic | Other | None | Unemployed (%) | Sources |
|---|---|---|---|---|---|---|---|---|---|---|---|
| 2001 (29 Apr) | 972 | 21.8 | 21.9 | 48.6 | 51.4 | 93.5 | 4.0 | 0.5 | 2.0 | 2.5 | |
| 2011 (27 Mar) | 1701 | 25.4 | 15.2 | 48.5 | 51.5 | 84.2 | 7.1 | 0.8 | 7.9 | 12 | |
| 2021 (21 Mar) | 1977 | 23 | 10 | 50 | 50 | 78 | 7 | >1 | 15 | 2 | |

== People ==
- Loyalist Robin "the Jackal" Jackson, former leader of the Ulster Volunteer Force's (UVF) Mid-Ulster Brigade, was a notable resident of Donaghcloney up until his death of lung cancer at the age of 52 on 30 May 1998. At least fifty killings have been attributed to Jackson, according to Stephen Howe (in the New Statesman magazine) and David McKittrick (in his book Lost Lives).
- Bernard McQuirt, recipient of the Victoria Cross in 1858.

== Civil parish of Donaghcloney ==
The civil parish is situated in the historic barony of Iveagh Lower, Upper Half and contains the following settlements:

- Donaghcloney
- Waringstown

=== Townlands ===
The civil parish contains the following townlands:

- Annaghanoon
- Annaghmakeonan
- Ballygunaghan
- Ballynabragget
- Banoge
- Corcreeny
- Cornreany
- Donaghcloney
- Lurgantamry
- Magherana
- Monree
- Moygannon
- Tullycarn
- Tullyherron
