= Laurencetown railway station =

Railway station in County Down, Northern Ireland

Laurencetown
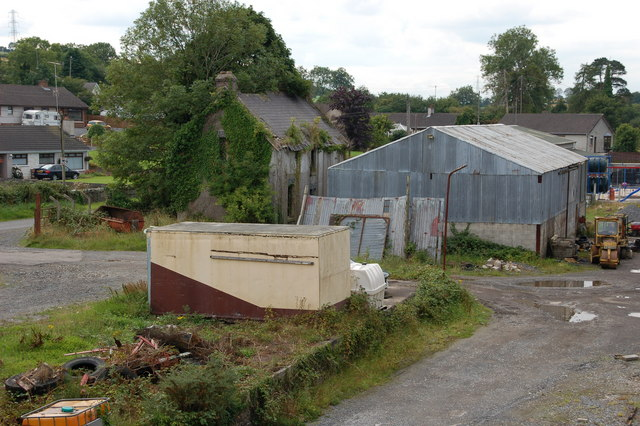
- Remains of Laurencetown station photographed on 16 August 2006.

General information
- Location: Laurencetown, County Down; Northern Ireland
- Coordinates: 54.3776°N 6.3109°W

Other information
- Status: Disused

History
- Original company: Banbridge Junction Railway
- Pre-grouping: Great Northern Railway (Ireland)
- Post-grouping: Great Northern Railway (Ireland)

Key dates
- 23 March 1859: Station opens
- 2 May 1955: Station closes
Location

Laurencetown railway station was on the Banbridge Junction Railway which ran from Scarva to Banbridge in Northern Ireland.

== History ==
The station was opened on 23 March 1859.

The station closed on 2 May 1955.

== Routes ==
Preceding station	Historical railways	Following station
Scarva	Banbridge Junction Railway; Scarva-Banbridge 1859-1904	Banbridge
Scarva	Great Northern Railway (Ireland); Scarva-Banbridge 1904-1955	Lenaderg
