= Magheralin (civil parish) =

Civil parish in Northern Ireland

Magheralin is a civil parish largely in County Down, Northern Ireland. It is situated in the historic baronies of Iveagh Lower, Upper Half in County Down and Oneilland East (three townlands) in County Armagh.

== Settlements ==
The civil parish contains the following settlements:

- Dollingstown
- Magheralin

== Townlands ==
Magheralin civil parish contains the following townlands (townlands marked with a * are in County Armagh):

- Ballykeel
- Ballyleny
- Ballymacanally
- Ballymacateer
- Ballymacbredan
- Ballymacbrennan
- Ballymacmaine
- Ballymagin
- Ballymakeonan
- Ballynadrone
- Clankilvoragh*
- Clogher
- Derrylisnahavil*
- Donagreagh*
- Drumcro and Drumo
- Drumlin
- Drumnabreeze
- Drumnaferry
- Drumo and Drumcro
- Edenballycoggill
- Edenmore
- Feney
- Gartross
- Gregorlough
- Kilfullert
- Kircassock
- Lismaine
- Lisnashanker
- Lisnasure
- Taughlumny
- Taughrane
- Tullyanaghan
- Tullynacross

== See also ==
- List of civil parishes of County Down
