= Magherally =

Magherally: Irish: An Mhachaire Abhlaí
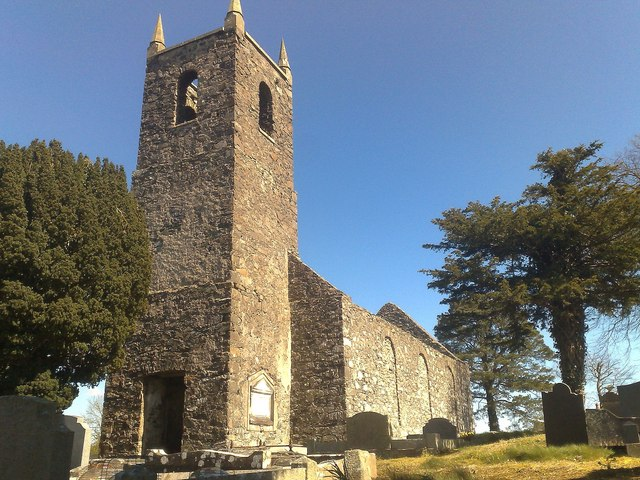
- Magherally Old Church in 2009
- County: County Down
- Country: Northern Ireland
- Sovereign state: United Kingdom
- Police: Northern Ireland
- Fire: Northern Ireland
- Ambulance: Northern Ireland

Magherally (from Irish An Mhachaire Abhlaí, meaning 'apple-tree plain') is a civil parish and townland (of 491 acres) in County Down, Northern Ireland. It is largely situated in the historic barony of Iveagh Lower, Lower Half, with one townland (Tullyhinan) in the barony of Iveagh Lower, Upper Half. The townland of Magherally contains the parish church.

== History ==
The parish appears with the name Analle in the Papal Taxation of 1306 and the original church name may have been Abhaill (apple-tree). The Machaire (plain) part of the name appears in the 17th century.

== Civil parish of Magherally ==
The civil parish includes the village of Corbet.

== Townlands ==
The civil parish contains the following townlands:

- Ballycross
- Ballymoney
- Corbet
- Drumneth
- Kilmacrew
- Magherally
- Mullafernaghan
- Tonaghmore
- Tullyhinan
- Tullyrain

== See also ==
- List of townlands in County Down
- List of civil parishes of County Down
