= Drumballyroney =

Civil parish in County Down, Northern Ireland

Drumballyroney is a civil parish in County Down, Northern Ireland. It is situated in the historic barony of Iveagh Upper, Lower Half.

== Settlements ==
The civil parish contains the following settlements:

- Rathfriland

== Townlands ==
Drumballyroney civil parish contains the following townlands:

- Annahunshigo
- Aughnavallog
- Ballybrick
- Ballynamagna
- Ballyroney
- Cavan
- Drumarkin
- Drumdreenagh
- Edenagarry
- Grallaghgreenan
- Imdel
- Lackan
- Lisnacreevy
- Lisnacroppan
- Lisnavaghrog
- Lisnisk
- Lissize
- Moneygore
- Rossconor
- Seafin
- Tirfergus
- Tirkelly
- Tirygory

== See also ==
- List of civil parishes of County Down
