= Witter (civil parish) =

Civil parish on the Ards Peninsula, Northern Ireland

Witter is a civil parish in County Down, Northern Ireland. It is situated in the historic barony of Ards Upper.

== Townlands ==
Witter civil parish contains the following townlands:

- Ballyedock (also known as Carrstown)
- Ballyfinragh
- Ballygalget
- Ballymarter
- Ballyquintin
- Ballywhollart
- Carrstown (also known as Ballyedock)
- Keentagh
- Killydressy
- Tara
- Tieveshilly
- Tullycarnan

== See also ==
- List of civil parishes of County Down
