= Corbet =

Village in County Down, Northern Ireland

Coordinates: 54.20°N 6.12°W

Corbet: Irish: An Carbad
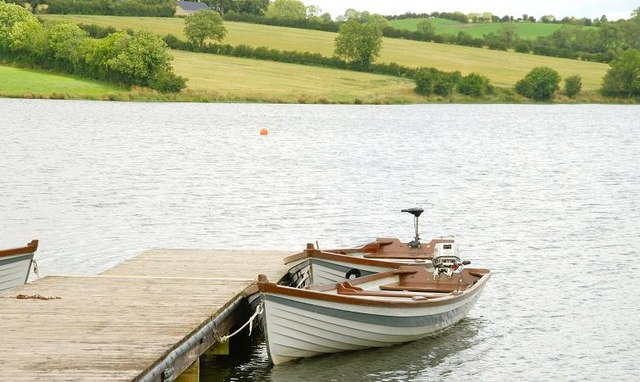
- Corbet Lough in 2009

- Location within County Down
- Population: 107 (2011 Census)
- District: Banbridge
- County: County Down
- Country: Northern Ireland
- Sovereign state: United Kingdom
- Post town: Banbridge
- Postcode district: BT32
- Dialling code: 028

Corbet (from Irish An Carbad, meaning 'the jaw/boulder') is a small village and townland (of 618 acres) in County Down, Northern Ireland, 5 km east of Banbridge. It is situated in the civil parish of Magherally and the historic barony of Iveagh Lower, Lower Half. It lies within the Banbridge District. It had a population of 107 people (39 households) in the 2011 Census. (2001 Census: 95 people)

== Places of interest ==
- Corbet Lough is a reservoir and important angling lake with the 70 acre trout fishery controlled by Banbridge Angling Club. Facilities at the Lough include a boating dock and jetty and numerous fishing stands.
- The River Bann also flows nearby.

== The Great Northern Railway ==
Corbet railway station was on the extensive Great Northern Railway (Ireland) system.

The station was opened on 1 March 1880.

The station closed on 2 May 1955. This action took place under the Ulster Transport Authority, cutting Newcastle, County Down from the rail network.
