= Ardarragh =

Townland in Northern Ireland

Coordinates: 54°14′6″N 6°14′9″W

Ardarragh: Irish: Ard Darach
- Location within County Down
- County: County Down
- Country: Northern Ireland
- Sovereign state: United Kingdom
- Postcode district: BT
- Dialling code: 028

Ardarragh (from Irish Ard Darach 'high place of the oak') is a rural townland in County Down, Northern Ireland. It has an area of 456.31 acres (1.847 km^{2}). It is situated in the civil parish of Newry and the historic barony of Lordship of Newry, located 5.5 miles north-east of Newry. It lies within the Newry, Mourne and Down District Council.

== See also ==
- List of townlands in County Down
