= Ballyphilip (civil parish) =

Parish in County Down, Northern Ireland

Coordinates: 54°22′33″N 5°30′52″W

- Location within Northern Ireland
- Country: Northern Ireland
- Sovereign state: United Kingdom
- Police: Northern Ireland
- Fire: Northern Ireland
- Ambulance: Northern Ireland

Ballyphilip is a civil parish and townland (of 180 acres) in County Down, Northern Ireland. It is on the Ards Peninsula, in the historic barony of Ards Upper.

== Settlements ==
The civil parish includes the following settlements:

- Portaferry

== Townlands ==
Ballyphilip civil parish contains the following townlands:

- Ardgeehan
- Ballyblack
- Ballycam
- Ballygarvigan
- Ballyphilip
- Ballyrusley
- Craigaroddan
- Derry
- Granagh
- Knockinelder
- Tullyboard
- Tullymally
- Tullynacrew

== See also ==
- List of civil parishes of County Down
