= Ashfield Halt railway station =

Railway station in Northern Ireland

Coordinates: 54.3943°N 6.1781°W

Ashfield Halt

General information
- Location: Northern Ireland, County Down; Northern Ireland

Other information
- Status: Disused

Key dates
- 1 August 1863: Station opened
- 30 April 1956: Station closed
Location

Ashfield Halt railway station served Ashfield in County Down, Northern Ireland. Sited 2 miles south of Dromore the station was served by the line from Lisburn to Banbridge.

== History ==
Built by the Great Northern Railway (Ireland), and closed by that concern in 1956.

Preceding station	Disused railways	Following station
Dromore	Great Northern Railway (Ireland); Lisburn - Banbridge line	Mullafernaghan

== The site today ==
There is no trace of the station left today.
