= Dollingstown =

Village in County Down, Northern Ireland

Coordinates: 54.4628°N 6.29054°W

Dollingstown: Irish: Baile Dhollainn
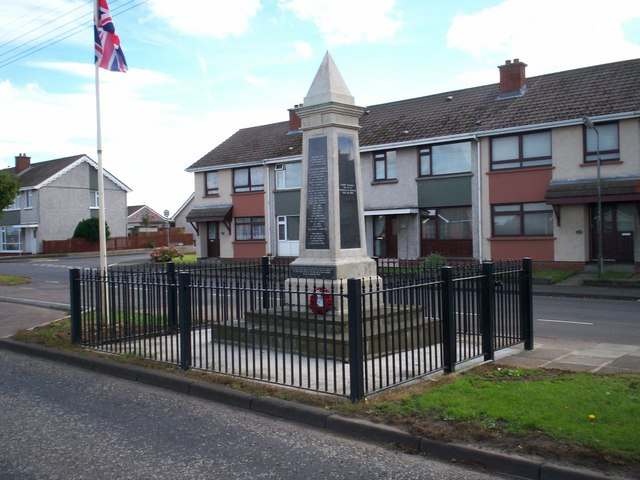

- Location within County Down
- Population: 2,103 (2011 census)
- District: Armagh, Banbridge and Craigavon
- County: County Down
- Country: Northern Ireland
- Sovereign state: United Kingdom
- Post town: CRAIGAVON
- Postcode district: BT66
- Dialling code: 028
- UK Parliament: Upper Bann
- NI Assembly: Upper Bann

Dollingstown is a large village in County Down, Northern Ireland, lying between Lurgan and Magheralin. It is within the Armagh, Banbridge and Craigavon district. In the 2011 census it had a population of 2,103 people. Dollingstown is in the townland of Taughrane, which may come from Irish Tóchar Rathain ("causeway of bracken").

== History ==
The village of Dollingstown is on the old road from Moira to Lurgan, and is in the townland of Taughrane, which may come from Irish Tóchar Rathain ("causeway of bracken") or Teach Raithin ("house of bracken"). It is said to be named from the Rev. Boghey Dolling, rector of the parish of Magheralin, who lived there in the 19th century. Dollingstown is not represented on 18th century maps, which suggests that Dollingstown probably didn't exist until the 1800s. Taughrane in its current spelling was first used in 1661. However, it had a variety of different spellings, beginning in 1655: Teaghrayne (1655), Tagharan (1657), Taghrane (1657), and then Taughrane in 1661.

== Sport ==
=== Dollingstown F.C. ===
Dollingstown's football club is Dollingstown F.C. They play in the NIFL Premier Intermediate League. Dollingstown's home stadium is Planters Park and the club was founded in 1979 by local football fan. The club's manager is Stephen Uprichard.

=== Sponsors ===
Notable sponsors of the club include Huhtamäki and Christians Against Poverty.

=== 2010–11 Season Incident ===
In the 2010–11 season, Dollingstown were rejected a promotion to IFA Championship 2 for allowing an ineligible player to play in eight league matches. Consequently, all the points they had obtained in the matches that player took part in were withdrew, and finished 4th place instead of 1st. In response, the decision was appealed by the club. The club ended up taking their case all the way to the High Court. However, it was dismissed. If Dollingstown had won their case, they would have been promoted, which would lead to Chimney Corner being relegated. Tandragee Rovers were thus declared champions of the division instead, but did not apply for their entry to the Championship.

== Religion ==
Protestantism is the dominant denomination of Christianity in Dollingstown. Dollingstown has a Protestant Anglican Church of Ireland church named Magheralin Parish. Magheralin Parish also has a church building in Magheralin.

== 2011 census ==
=== Age, Sex, Language, Religion, Ethnicity and Nationality ===
Dollingstown is currently classified as a village according to the NI Statistics and Research Agency (NISRA) (i.e. with a population between 1,000 and 2,250 people). On Census day (21 March 2011), there were 2,250 people living in Dollingstown. Of these:

- 20% were aged 0–14, 27% were aged 15–39, 37% were aged 40–64 and 16% were aged 65+
- 49% were male and 51% were female
- 96% spoke English as a first language, 2% had some ability in Irish and 13% had some ability in Ulster Scots
- 34% were Anglican (Church of Ireland), 18% were from Christian denomination/s apart from Protestantism and Catholicism, 14% were Presbyterian, 7% were Catholic, 3% were from other religions and 22% followed no religion or did not state their religion
- 97% were white and 3% were of another ethnic group
- 55% identified as British only, 3% identified as Irish only, 16% identified as Northern Irish only, <1% identified as British and Irish only, 16% identified as British and Northern Irish only, <1% identified as Irish and Northern Irish only, 2% identified as British, Irish and Northern Irish only and 6% had other national identities
- 72% held a UK passport only, 6% held an Ireland passport only, 5% held both a UK held both UK and Ireland passports, 4% held other passport(s) and 12% held no passport
- 89% were born in Northern Ireland, 3% were born in England, <1% were born in Scotland, <1% were born in Wales, 1% were born in the Republic of Ireland and 6% were born in another country

=== Other Census Statistics ===
- 2961/km^{2} Population Density
- 76 ha (0.76 km^{2}) Area

== See also ==
- List of towns and villages in Northern Ireland
