= Seapatrick =

Civil parish in County Down, Northern Ireland

Coordinates: 54.3682°N 6.27656°W

Seapatrick (from Irish Suí Phádraig, meaning 'St Patrick's seat') is a civil parish in County Down, Northern Ireland. It lies partly across the three historic baronies of Iveagh Upper, Upper Half, Iveagh Lower, Lower Half and Iveagh Lower, Upper Half.

== Civil parish of Seapatrick ==
The civil parish centres on the town of Banbridge.

== Townlands ==
The civil parish contains the following townlands:

=== B ===
Balleevy, Ballydown, Ballykeel, Ballykelly, Ballylough, Ballymoney, Ballyvally

=== D ===
Dooghary, Drumnagally, Drumnavaddy

=== E ===
Edenderry

=== K ===
Kilpike

=== L ===
Lisnafiffy, Lisnaree

=== T ===
Tullyconnaught, Tullyear

== See also ==
- List of civil parishes of County Down
- List of townlands in County Down
