= Castleboy (civil parish) =

Civil parish and townland in Northern Ireland

Castleboy is a civil parish and townland (of 151 acres) in County Down, Northern Ireland. It is situated in the historic barony of Ards Upper.

== Settlements ==
The civil parish contains the village of Cloghy.

== Townlands ==
Castleboy civil parish contains the following townlands:

- Ballyadam
- Broom Quarter
- Castleboy
- Cloghy
- Drumardan
- Drumardan Quarter
- Loughdoo
- Tullycross
- Tullytramon

== See also ==
- List of civil parishes of County Down
