= Sheeptown =

Village in County Down, Northern Ireland

Coordinates: 54°12′30″N 6°19′30″W

Sheeptown: Irish: Áth Cruithne ‘Ford of the Cruithin’
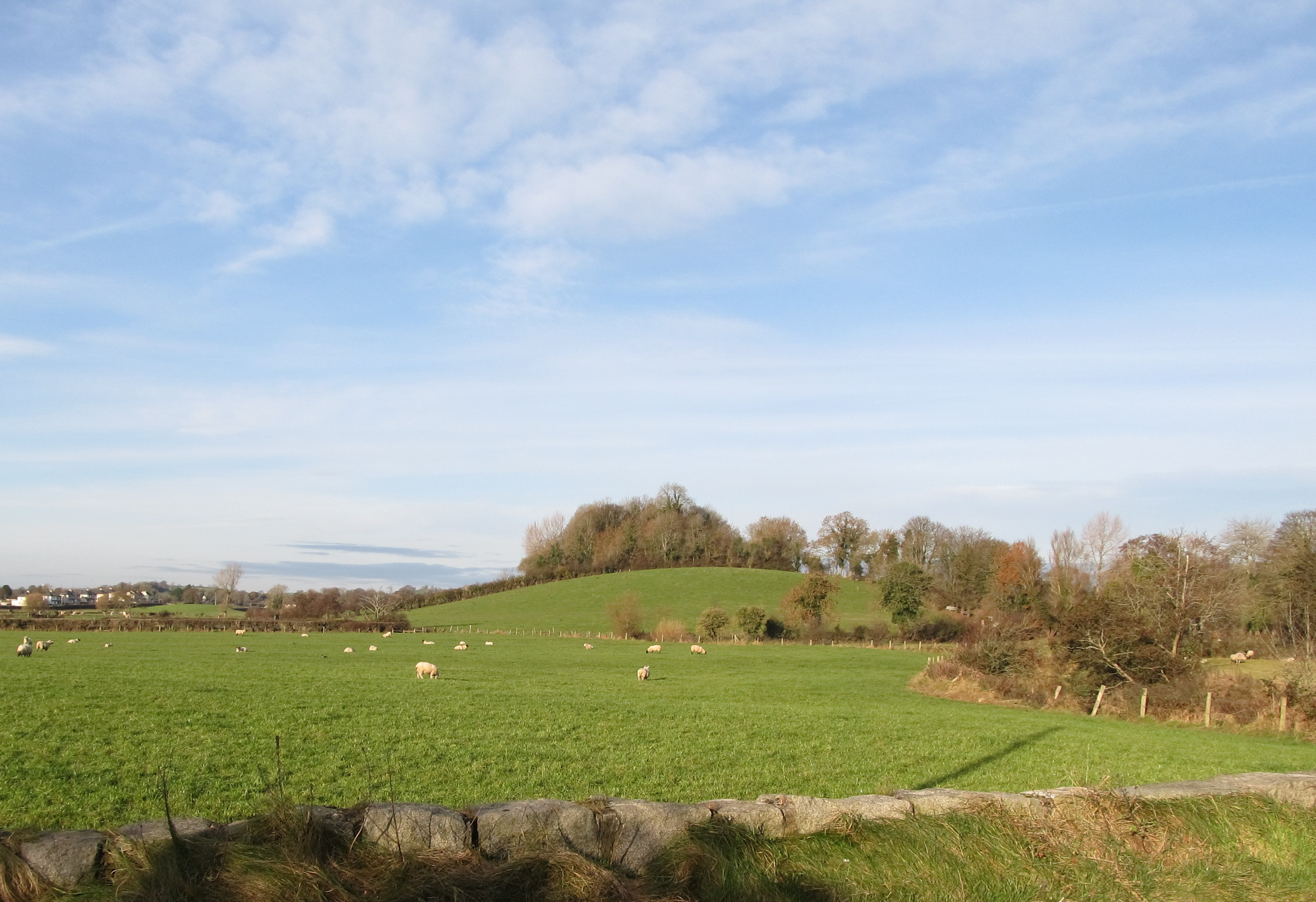
- The Crown Mound, a prominent motte in Sheeptown

- Location within Northern Ireland Location within County Down Sheeptown (County Down)
- Population: 309 (2021 census)
- Irish grid reference: J123456
- District: Newry, Mourne and Down
- County: County Down
- Country: Northern Ireland
- Sovereign state: United Kingdom
- Post town: NEWRY
- Postcode district: BT34
- Dialling code: 028
- UK Parliament: South Down
- NI Assembly: South Down

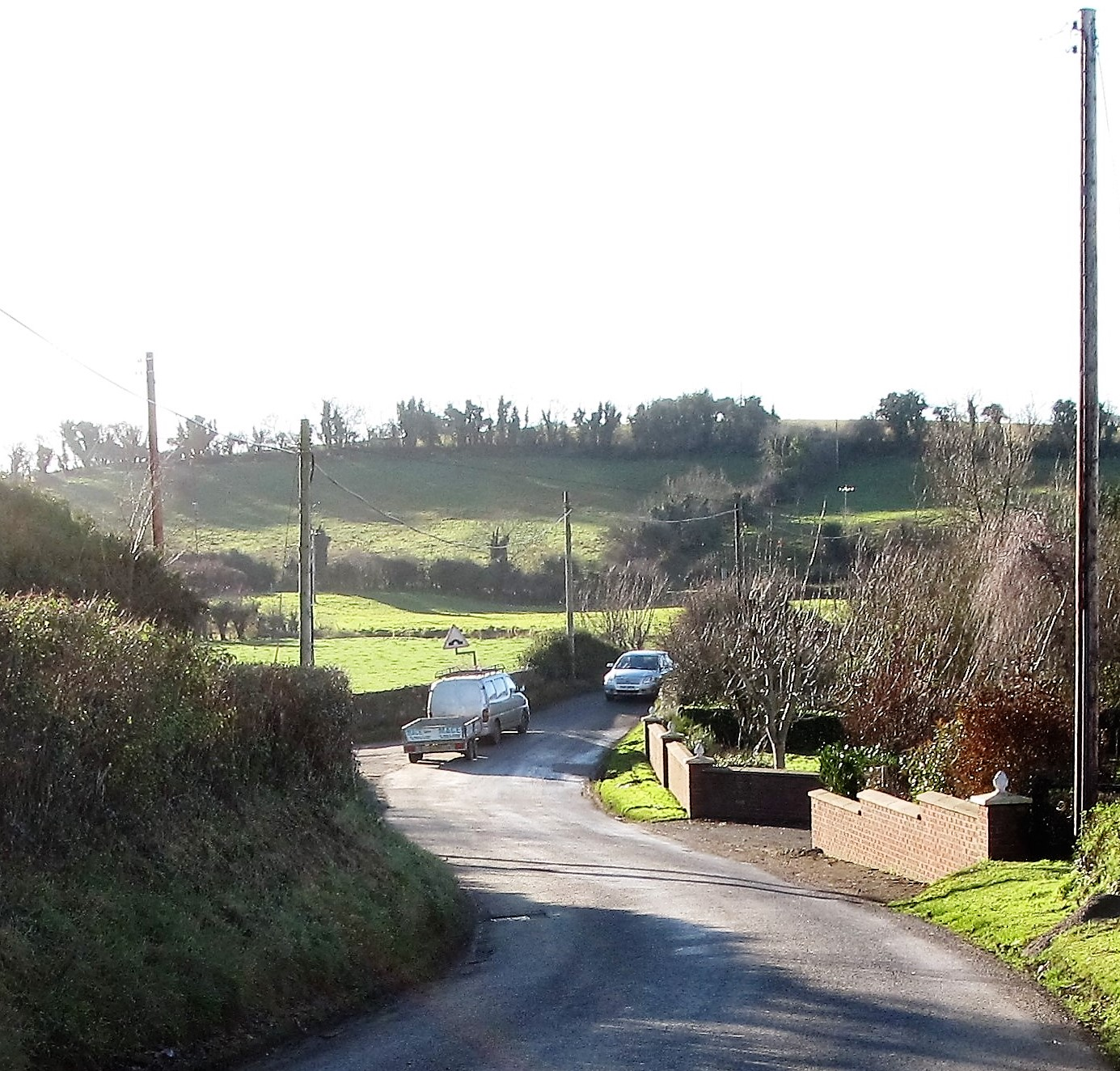
The Sheeptown Road/Ceobane Road junction at the northern end of the Crown Bridge Old

Sheeptown is a small village and townland in County Down, Northern Ireland. It lies to the northeast of Newry, on the old road between Newry and Rathfriland. It is part of the Newry Rural Electoral Division, within the civil parish of Newry (Down portion), and the barony of the Lordship of Newry. The townland covers approximately 2.38 km² (or 588 acres). Historically, the townland (or part of it) was called Athcruthain. In the 2001 Census it had a population of 204 people. It is part of the Newry and Mourne District Council area.

== History ==
The name Sheeptown is of English origin. However, the 1659 Census of Ireland recorded that all 21 inhabitants of the area described as "Savellbegg Sheepstowne & ½ Sheepstowne" were Irish.

=== Battle of Magh Rath (A.D. 637) ===
Sheeptown has been identified as a probable site of the Battle of Magh Rath (A.D. 637), based on topographical, archaeological, and historical evidence. The area features the Crown Rath, a large mound situated on a marshy plain near the confluence of the Glenree River and a stream from Derrylackagh, aligning with early descriptions of the battlefield as Magh Comair, later known as Magh Rath of the Red Pools; the Glenree River is understood to be a local name for the Newry River. Local tradition associates the site with a battle for the crown of Ireland, and numerous discoveries of human remains and weapons in Sheeptown and surrounding townlands support the occurrence of a significant conflict. Historical records from the early 17th century reference place names in Sheeptown that correspond to those found in medieval accounts of the battle, including Ath Ername (Ath an Ornaim - the ford of Ornam) and possibly Daire in latha (linked to Derrylackagh). These findings suggest that Sheeptown may more accurately reflect the location of the battle than the traditionally accepted site at Moira.

=== Defeat of the Carlingford vikings (A.D. 926) ===
In December 926, Muirchertach mac Néill, also known as Muirchertach of the Leather Cloaks, is recorded as having defeated a Viking force based at Carlingford, followed by a combined fleet from Strangford and Annagassan led by Hálfdan of Dublin. According to historical accounts, the surviving Norse forces retreated and were besieged for a week at Áth Cruithne ("Ford of the Cruithin"), a location identified with the modern townland of Sheeptown, northeast of Newry.

Local heritage researchers have speculated that the nearby earthwork known as the Crown Mound, situated close to the presumed site of the ford, may have played a role in these events. If so, this would suggest that the mound predates the Anglo-Norman period, to which it has traditionally been attributed. It has been noted that prehistoric mounds located near fording points are sometimes misidentified as later motte-and-bailey structures, and this may be the case at Sheeptown.

=== Áth Cruithne (A.D. 1213) ===
Historical sources refer to a castle (Irish: caislén) at Áth Cruithne, a subdivision of Sheeptown, which was reportedly attacked in 1213 Ó Néill, resulting in the deaths of the English inhabitants.

=== Castle of Athcruthain (A.D. 1237) ===
In 1237, Hugh de Lacy confirmed a grant of "the castle of Athcruthain with all its islands and appurtenances" to the Cistercian abbey of Newry. This grant was said to reaffirm earlier donations in A.D.1154 made by Muirchertach mac Lochlainn and other Irish nobles prior to the advent of the English in Ireland. The motte-and-bailey structure overlooking the Newry River, known as the Crown Mound, may correspond to the site of this early castle. The name "Crown" may derive from "Cruithne", referencing the early Irish people associated with the area.

== Archeology ==
=== Crown mound ===
Crown Mound is a motte-and-bailey earthwork occupies a ridge overlooking the Clanrye River, with surrounding land prone to flooding. The motte stands approximately 45 feet high and has an oval summit measuring around 60 by 40 feet. It is encircled by a waterlogged ditch, and a nearly square bailey lies to the south, measuring up to 150 feet in length.

The top of the motte is about 50 feet across and, despite dense undergrowth on its sides and surrounding ditch, remains largely free of trees. Apart from nettles, the summit is considered well-preserved and has been identified as a promising site for archaeological excavation. The bailey is elevated by a steep scarp and bordered by a quarry ditch, likely used to source material for its construction. There is no second bailey to the north.

Historical references to Crown Mound date back to the 18th century, and local folklore associates the site with fairies and a buried Danish crown. Archaeological assessments in the 20th century noted its potential significance, though later expert opinion suggested it may be a raised rath rather than a motte.

== Crown bridge ==
Crown Bridge (HB16/14/035), built in the early 19th century, is a three-arch granite bridge that carries the Newry–Rathfriland road over the Clanrye River. It features dressed stone cutwaters, raised keystones, and a curved eastern end with corbelling, reflecting the engineering style of its time. Constructed as part of a new road alignment in the 1810s, it is listed for its architectural and historical significance, offering a refined example of period bridge design.

In contrast, the nearby original Crown Bridge (HB16/14/034) is an older, four-arch hump-backed structure, likely dating in part to the 17th century. It includes flood arches and a rubble stone causeway, with a mix of random rubble and coursed granite construction. Only one arch currently spans water, and the bridge was part of the main route before the 1810s realignment. Its varied construction and landscape setting contribute to its architectural and historic interest, and it was listed in 1981.

== Geography ==
Townlands that border Sheeptown include:

- Cloghanramer, Saval Beg and Turmore to the north
- Carneyhough, Creeve, Crobane to the south
- Croreagh to the east
- Damolly and Drumcashellone to the west

== See also ==
- List of towns and villages in Northern Ireland
