= Iveagh Lower, Lower Half =

Barony in County Down, Northern Ireland

Iveagh Lower, Lower Half Uíbh Eachach Íochtarach, An Leath Íochtair(Irish)
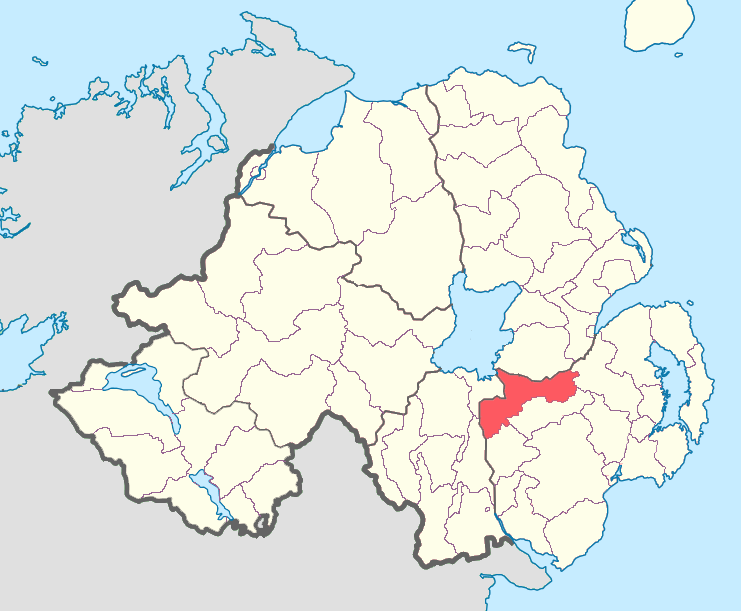
- Location of Iveagh Lower, Lower Half, County Down, Northern Ireland.
- Sovereign state: United Kingdom
- Country: Northern Ireland
- County: Down

Iveagh Lower, Lower Half is the name of a barony in County Down, Northern Ireland. It was created by 1851 with the division of the barony of Iveagh Lower into two. It is bordered by six other baronies: Massereene Upper to the north; Castlereagh Upper to the east; Iveagh Lower, Upper Half and Iveagh Upper, Upper Half to the south; Oneilland East and Orior Lower to the west.

== List of settlements ==
Below is a list of settlements in Iveagh Upper, Lower Half:

=== Towns ===
- Dromore

=== Villages ===
- Corbet
- Dromara
- Kinallen
- Waringstown

== List of civil parishes ==
Below is a list of civil parishes in Iveagh Lower, Lower Half:

- Aghaderg (two townlands, rest in baronies of Iveagh Upper, Lower Half and Iveagh Upper, Upper Half)
- Annahilt (also partly in barony of Kinelarty (one townland))
- Dromara (also partly in baronies of Iveagh Upper, Lower Half and Kinelarty)
- Dromore (also partly in barony of Iveagh Lower, Upper Half (one townland))
- Drumgooland (also partly in barony of Iveagh Upper, Lower Half (one townland))
- Garvaghy (also partly in barony of Iveagh Upper, Lower Half)
- Magheradrool (one townland, rest in barony of Kinelarty)
- Magherally (one townland in barony of Iveagh Lower, Upper Half)
- Seapatrick (also partly in baronies of Iveagh Upper, Upper Half and Iveagh Lower, Upper Half)
- Tullylish (also partly in barony of Iveagh Lower, Upper Half)
