= Clonduff (civil parish) =

Parish in County Down, Northern Ireland

Clonduff is a civil parish in County Down, Northern Ireland. It is mainly in the historic barony of Iveagh Upper, Lower Half, with one townland in the barony of Iveagh Upper, Upper Half.

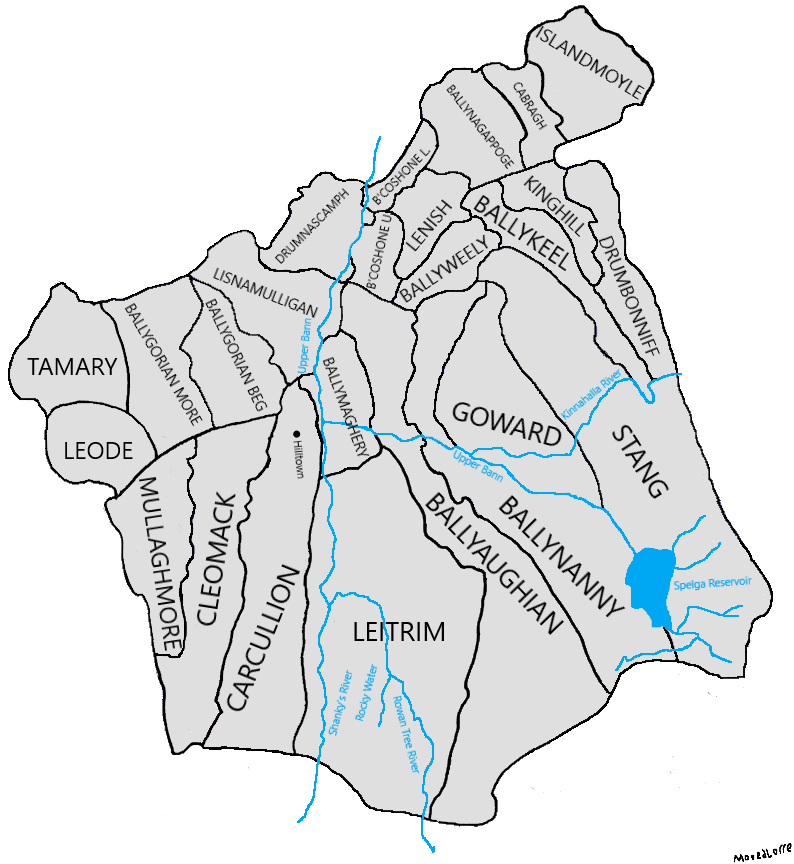
A map of Clonduff civil parish

== Settlements ==
The civil parish contains the following settlements:

- Hilltown

== Townlands ==
Clonduff civil parish contains the following townlands:

- Ballyaughian
- Ballycoshone Lower
- Ballycoshone Upper
- Ballygorian Beg
- Ballygorian More
- Ballykeel
- Ballymaghery
- Ballynagappoge
- Ballynanny
- Ballyweely
- Cabragh
- Carcullion
- Cavan
- Cleomack
- Drumnascamph
- Drumbonniff
- Goward
- Islandmoyle
- Kinghill
- Leitrim
- Lenish
- Leode
- Lisnamulligan
- Mullaghmore
- Stang
- Tamary

== See also ==
- List of civil parishes of County Down
