= Finnis souterrain =

Coordinates: 54°19′22″N 6°1′7″W

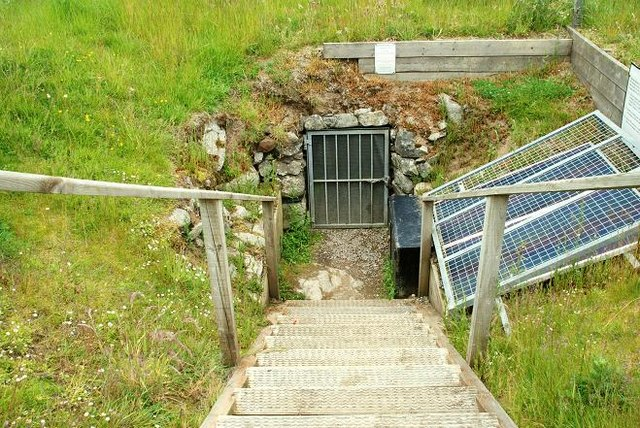
Entrance to Finnis souterrain

Finnis souterrain, also known locally as Binder's Cove, is an excavated drystone souterrain in Finnis (Irish: Fionnais), south of Dromara, County Down, Northern Ireland. The site is a scheduled monument and is one of only a few souterrains open to the public.

== Structure ==
Interior of Finnis souterrain showing the dry stone walls and flat stone roof.

The site is made up of a 30 metres (98 ft) long main passage that runs east to west, with two 6 metres (20 ft) long side passages on the right-hand side that open into small chambers. All three passages are approximately 1 metre (3 ft 3 in) wide. The first 7.5 metres (25 ft) of the main passage is approximately 1 meter high, after which there is a low lintel structure and the passage continues at approximately 1.5 metres (4 ft 11 in) in height in a slight downward curve.

The walls are granite and were constructed using a dry stone method. The roof consists of flat stone lintels that span between the walls.

The current entrance is not in the original location, which is unknown. It is also unknown when the current entrance was created, but it dates to at least 1833 when an iron door was installed by the parish rector. It is thought that the main passage may have continued further east of the present-day entrance. A description from 1836 mentions stone steps which have not been found.

== History ==
The souterrain was first built in the 9th century and records of it date to the early 18th century. Although the exact purpose of souterrains has been debated, it is thought that they were used as a refuge from raiders or invaders, or a place to store religious artifacts. As souterrains are dry and cold places, they may have also been used to store food.

In 1977, the site was cleared and surveyed by archaeologists but no formal excavation took place. Work to restore the site and open it to the public later began after collaboration between the landowner and Banbridge District Council. Funding for this was provided by the Mourne Heritage Trust, the Environment and heritage Service and the Northern Ireland Tourist Board. Soil that had built up inside was removed, some minor repairs were made, stone chippings were used to cover the floor, solar lights were placed along the walls of the passageways and the iron door was replaced. A fenced pathway along the edge of the field was also built and an information board was placed next to the entrance. Work was completed and it was opened to the public in July 2003.
