= Slanes =

Civil parish on the Ards Peninsula, Northern Ireland

Slanes is a civil parish and townland (of 197 acres) in County Down, Northern Ireland. It is situated in the historic barony of Ards Upper.

== Townlands ==
Slanes civil parish contains the following townlands:

- Ardminnan
- Ballyspurge
- Dooey
- Newcastle
- Slanes

== See also ==
- List of civil parishes of County Down
