= Ards Upper =

Ards Upper An Aird Uachtarach (Irish)
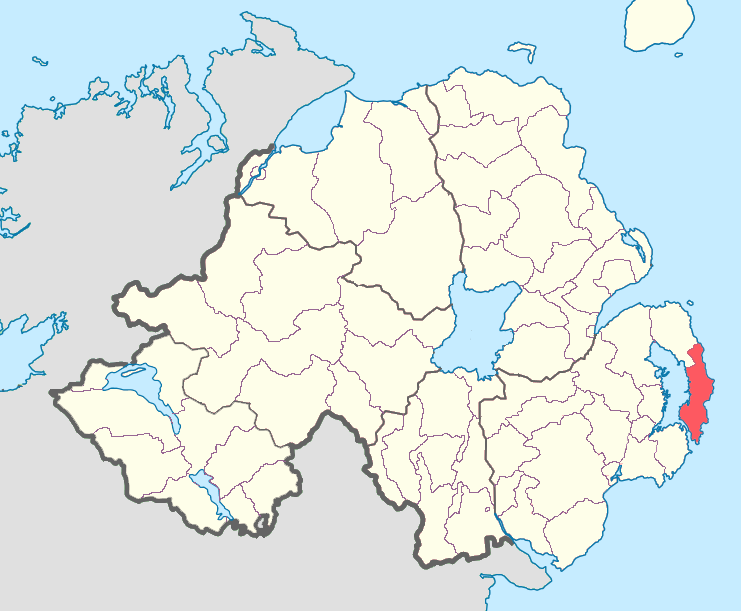
- Location of Ards Upper, County Down, Northern Ireland.
- Coordinates: 54°27′18″N 5°30′22″W
- Sovereign state: United Kingdom
- Country: Northern Ireland
- County: Down

Ards Upper (named after the former barony of Ards) is a barony in County Down, Northern Ireland. It lies on the southern half of the Ards Peninsula in the east of the county, with the Irish Sea to its east and Strangford Lough to its west. It is bordered by two other baronies: Ards Lower to the north; and Lecale Lower just across the mouth of Strangford Lough to the south.

The barony of Ards Upper was created in 1851 when the barony of Ards was split into two, the other part being Ards Lower. The territory includes the lands of that part of the ancient barony of Ards known as Mid or Middle Ards, which is located in the north of Ards Upper.

== List of settlements ==
Below is a list of settlements in Ards Upper:

=== Towns ===
- Portaferry

=== Villages ===
- Ballyhalbert
- Ballywalter
- Cloghy
- Kircubbin
- Portavogie

== List of civil parishes ==
Below is a list of civil parishes in Ards Upper:

- Ardkeen
- Ardquin
- Ballyphilip
- Ballytrustan
- Ballywalter
- Castleboy
- Inishargy
- Slanes
- St. Andrews (alias Ballyhalbert)
- Witter
