= Dromara (civil parish) =

Civil parish in County Down, Northern Ireland

Dromara is a civil parish in County Down, Northern Ireland. It is situated in the historic baronies of Iveagh Upper, Lower Half, Iveagh Lower, Lower Half and Kinelarty.

== Settlements ==
The civil parish contains the following settlements:

- Dromara

== Townlands ==
Dromara civil parish contains the following townlands:

- Ardtanagh
- Aughnaskeagh
- Ballykine
- Begny
- Burren
- Clontanagullion
- Crossgar
- Derry
- Dooglen
- Dree
- Drin
- Dromara
- Drumadoney
- Drumgavlin
- Drumkeeragh
- Dunbeg Lower
- Dunbeg Upper
- Dunmore
- Edendarriff
- Finnis
- Gransha
- Guiness
- Levallyreagh
- Moneynabane
- Moybrick Lower
- Moybrick Upper
- Moydalgan
- Mullaghdrin

== See also ==
- List of civil parishes of County Down
