= Mullafernaghan railway station =

Former railway station in County Down, Northern Ireland

Coordinates: 54.384615°N 6.212773°W

Mullafernaghan
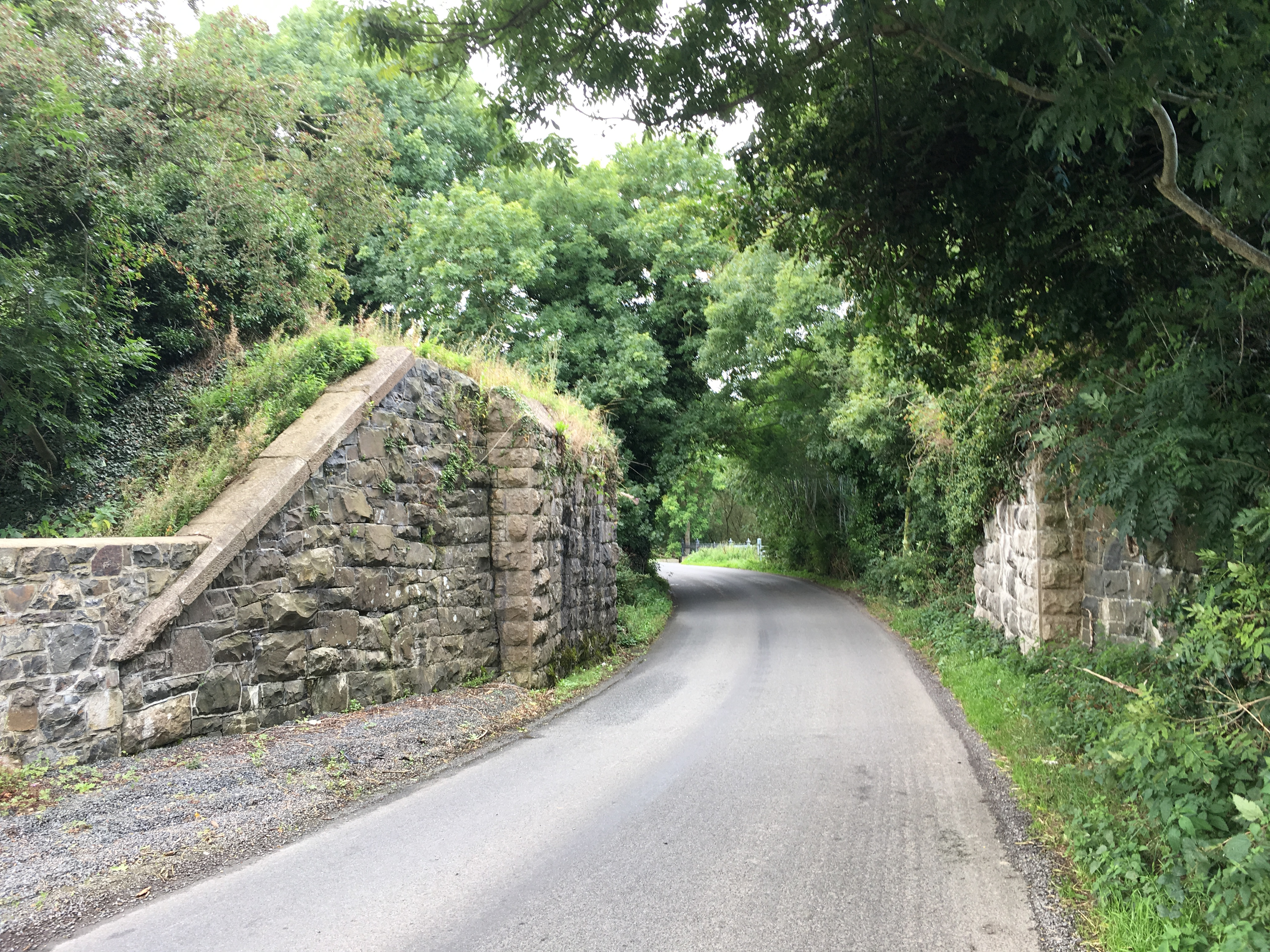
- Remains of the bridge which once carried the railway across the Mullafernaghan Road immediately to the east of the station.

General information
- Location: Mullafernaghan, County Down; Northern Ireland

Other information
- Status: Disused

History
- Original company: Banbridge, Lisburn and Belfast Railway
- Pre-grouping: Great Northern Railway (Ireland)
- Post-grouping: Great Northern Railway (Ireland)

Key dates
- 1 August 1863: Station opens
- 30 April 1956: Station closes
Location

Mullafernaghan railway station was on the Banbridge, Lisburn and Belfast Railway which ran from Knockmore Junction to Banbridge in Northern Ireland. It served the village of Mullafernaghan, and the neighbouring villages of Blackskull and Donaghcloney.

== History ==
The station was opened on 1 August 1863. It closed on 30 April 1956.

It had one platform with a brick waiting room, a siding, and a goods shed.

Preceding station	Historical railways	Following station
Ashfield Halt	Banbridge, Lisburn and Belfast Railway; Knockmore Junction-Banbridge	Banbridge (BLBR)

== The station today ==
Today the station is in private ownership. The waiting room and goods shed have been converted to accommodation, whilst part of the platform, as well as the abutments for the bridge over the Mullafernaghan Road, still stand.
