= Lenaderg =

Village in Northern Ireland

Lenaderg Láithreach Deirce
- Village
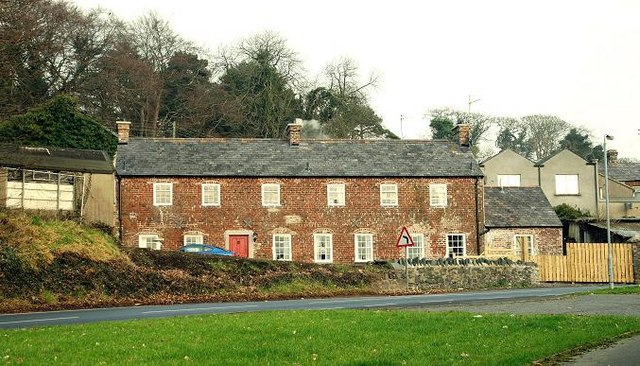
- Former millhouses in Lenaderg in 2009

- Lenaderg's location within Northern Ireland
- Coordinates: 54.374°N 6.292°W

Population (2001)
  - Total: 261

Lenaderg is a small village and townland of 335 acres (136 ha) in County Down, Northern Ireland. It sits on the banks of the River Bann, about two miles from Banbridge and a half mile from the village of Lawrencetown. It is situated in the civil parish of Tullylish and the historic barony of Iveagh Lower, Upper Half. As of the 2001 census, it had a population of 261 people. Lenaderg is within the District of Banbridge.

Its name is derived from the Irish language. One theory is that it comes from Léana Dhearg meaning "red meadow". However, the townland was historically called Laraderick and Laraghderick, which is believed to be derived from Láithreach Deirce.

== Industry ==
Milltown Bleach Works at Lenaderg, was demolished mid-20th century. A group of mill workers’ houses still remains.

== Transport ==
Lenaderg railway station, which was on the line from Scarva to Banbridge, opened on 1 January 1904 and closed on 2 May 1955.

== See also ==
- List of towns and villages in Northern Ireland
- List of townlands in County Down
