= Inishargy =

Civil parish on the Ards Peninsula, Northern Ireland

Coordinates: 54.5016°N 5.5172°W

Inishargy is a civil parish and townland (of 1,050 acres) in County Down, Northern Ireland. It is situated in the historic barony of Ards Upper.

== Settlements ==
The civil parish contains the village of Kircubbin.

== Townlands ==
Inishargy civil parish contains the following townlands:

- Balliggan
- Ballygarvan
- Ballyobegan
- Fish Quarter
- Glastry
- Gransha
- Horse Island
- Inishargy
- Kircubbin
- Nun's Quarter
- Rowreagh
- Sheelah's Island

== See also ==
- List of civil parishes of County Down
