= Ballytrustan (civil parish) =

Civil parish on the Ards Peninsula, Northern Ireland

Coordinates: 54°23′11″N 5°29′58″W

- Location within Northern Ireland
- Country: Northern Ireland
- Sovereign state: United Kingdom
- Police: Northern Ireland
- Fire: Northern Ireland
- Ambulance: Northern Ireland

Ballytrustan is a civil parish and townland (of 222 acres) in County Down, Northern Ireland. It is situated in the historic barony of Ards Upper.

== Townlands ==
Ballytrustan civil parish contains the following townlands:

- Ballybranigan
- Ballyfounder
- Ballymacnamee
- Ballynichol
- Ballytrustan
- Ballywierd
- Corrogs
- Kearny
- Parson Hall

== See also ==
- List of civil parishes of County Down
