= Lenaderg railway station =

Railway station in County Down, Northern Ireland

Lenaderg
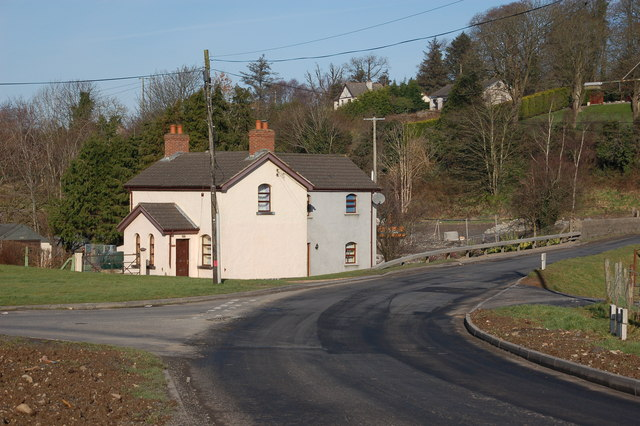
- Former station buildings photographed on 18 February 2007

General information
- Location: Lenaderg, County Down; Northern Ireland
- Coordinates: 54.372777°N 6.285458°W

Other information
- Status: Disused

History
- Original company: Great Northern Railway (Ireland)
- Pre-grouping: Great Northern Railway (Ireland)
- Post-grouping: Great Northern Railway (Ireland)

Key dates
- 1 January 1904: Station opens
- 1 July 1904: Station closes to passengers
- 1 July 1907: Station reopens to passengers
- 2 May 1955: Station closes
Location

Lenaderg railway station was on the Banbridge Junction Railway which ran from Scarva to Banbridge, via Lenaderg, in Northern Ireland.

== History ==
The station was opened on 1 January 1904. It was closed to passengers from 1 July 1904 to 1 July 1907. It closed on 2 May 1955.

| Preceding station | Historical railways | Following station |
|---|---|---|
| Laurencetown | Banbridge Junction Railway; Scarva-Banbridge | Smyth's Siding |
