= Lurganville =

Townland in County Down, Northern Ireland

Coordinates: 54.463°N 6.187°W

Lurganville (historically Lurganavill or Lurganaveel, from Irish Lorgain a' Mhíl, meaning 'long ridge of the hare') is the name of a small village and of a townland in County Down, Northern Ireland. In the 2001 Census it had a population of 102 people. It is situated in the Lisburn City Council area. Locally significant buildings include St Colman's Church, which is a listed building, and the Parochial House.

Historically the village has been referred to locally as Kilwarlin after the parish in which it lies. Road signs identifying the village as Lurganville, in the Lisburn & Castlereagh City Council area, have been erected recently (2019) on the approach roads to it.

== See also ==
- List of villages in Northern Ireland
