= Kinallen =

Coordinates: 54.3811°N 6.0721°W

Kinallen: Irish: Cionn Álainn
- Village
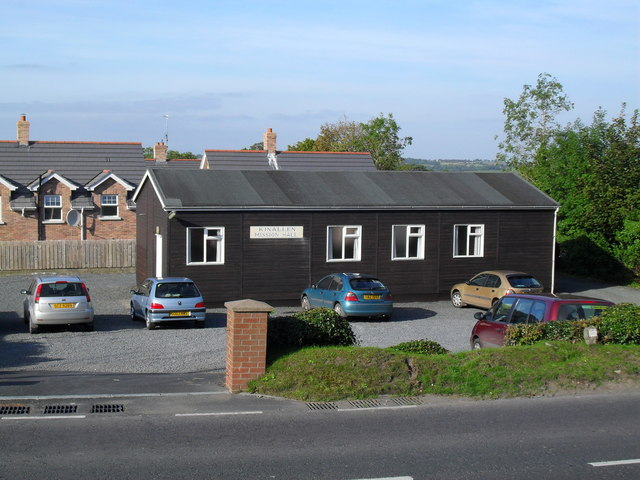
- Kinallen Mission Hall

- Location within County Down
- Population: 557 (2001 Census)
- Irish grid reference: J252497
  - Belfast: 20 miles
- District: Banbridge
- County: County Down
- Country: Northern Ireland
- Sovereign state: United Kingdom
- Post town: DROMORE
- Postcode district: BT25
- Dialling code: 028
- UK Parliament: Lagan Valley
- NI Assembly: Lagan Valley

Kinallen (from Irish Cionn Álainn, meaning 'beautiful headland') is a small village and townland in County Down, Northern Ireland. It is four miles from Dromore and two miles from Dromara.

The village has a shop, Post Office, Day Care center, Fair Hill Primary school and Nursery Unit, and an Orange Hall. Also First Dromara Presbyterian Church is located just beyond the townland boundary.

== Education ==
There is one school in the village, Fair Hill Primary School and Nursery Unit (formerly Kinallen Primary School).

The local secondary school students often attend Friends' School or Wallace High in Lisburn, Banbridge Academy or Dromore High School.

== Transport and communications ==
The village surrounds a crossroads, where the Banbridge-Dromara and Lisburn-Katesbridge roads meet. In recent years, the village has seen some population growth; 300 residents lived in the village in 1991 and it grew to 557 residents in 2001. This is mainly due to attractive house prices in the rural zones of Belfast's commuter belt, helped by Kinallen's desirable position in the countryside and its nearness to both the A1 dual-carriageway and the M1 motorway.

The village's recent popularity as a place to live has turned the area into a dormitory settlement for both Belfast and Lisburn.

The village is served by Translink Ulsterbus bus service 26, which runs between Dromara and Lisburn through Kinallen, Drumlough and Annahilt. At peak times, the service extends to the Europa Bus Centre in Belfast city centre.

Kinallen's official telephone dialling code, like the rest of Northern Ireland is 028. Kinallen lies within the Dromara telephone exchange area, meaning local numbers commence with 9753xxxx. Until the 2000 Big Number Change, the village constituted part of the 01238 area code (Saintfield/Ballynahinch/Dromara).

== 2001 Census ==
Kinallen is classified as a small village or hamlet by the Northern Ireland Statistics and Research Agency (NISRA) (i.e. with population between 500 and 1,000 people). On Census day (29 April 2001) there were 557 people living in Kinallen. Of these:

- 29.5% were aged under 16 years and 7.9% were aged 60 and over
- 50.6% of the population were male and 49.4% were female
- 6.3% were from a Catholic background and 89.2% were from a Protestant background
- 1.3% of people aged 16–74 were unemployed.
