= Iveagh Upper, Lower Half =

Barony in County Down, Northern Ireland

Iveagh Upper, Lower Half Uíbh Eachach Uachtarach, An Leath Íochtair(Irish)
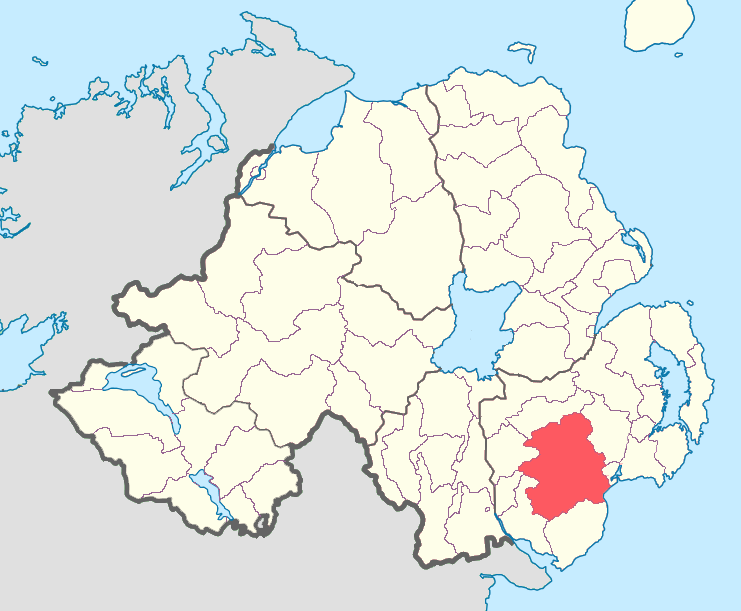
- Location of Iveagh Upper, Lower Half, County Down, Northern Ireland.
- Sovereign state: United Kingdom
- Country: Northern Ireland
- County: Down

Iveagh Upper, Lower Half is the name of a barony in County Down, Northern Ireland. It was created by 1851 with the division of the barony of Iveagh Upper into two. It lies in the centre of the county, and is bordered by six other baronies: Iveagh Upper, Upper Half and Lordship of Newry to the west; Mourne to the south; Kinelarty and Lecale Upper to the east; and Iveagh Lower, Upper Half to the north.

== List of settlements ==
Below is a list of the villages and population centres in Iveagh Upper, Lower Half:

=== Towns ===
- Newcastle
- Castlewellan

=== Villages ===
- Annsborough
- Bryansford
- Dromara
- Hilltown
- Kilcoo
- Leitrim
- Waringsford

=== Population centres ===
- Katesbridge

== List of civil parishes ==
Below is a list of civil parishes in Iveagh Upper, Lower Half:

- Aghaderg (one townland, rest in baronies of Iveagh Lower, Lower Half and Iveagh Upper, Upper Half)
- Clonduff (also partly in barony of Iveagh Upper, Upper Half (one townland))
- Dromara (also partly in baronies of Iveagh Lower, Lower Half and Kinelarty)
- Drumballyroney
- Drumgooland (also partly in barony of Iveagh Lower, Lower Half (one townland))
- Garvaghy (also partly in barony of Iveagh Lower, Lower Half)
- Kilbroney (one townland, rest in barony of Iveagh Upper, Upper Half)
- Kilmegan (also partly in baronies of Kinelarty and Lecale Upper)
- Maghera
- Newry (one townland, rest in baronies of Lordship of Newry, Oneilland West and Orior Upper)
