= Iveagh Lower, Upper Half =

Barony in County Down, Northern Ireland

Iveagh Lower, Upper Half Uíbh Eachach Íochtarach, An Leath Uachtair(Irish)
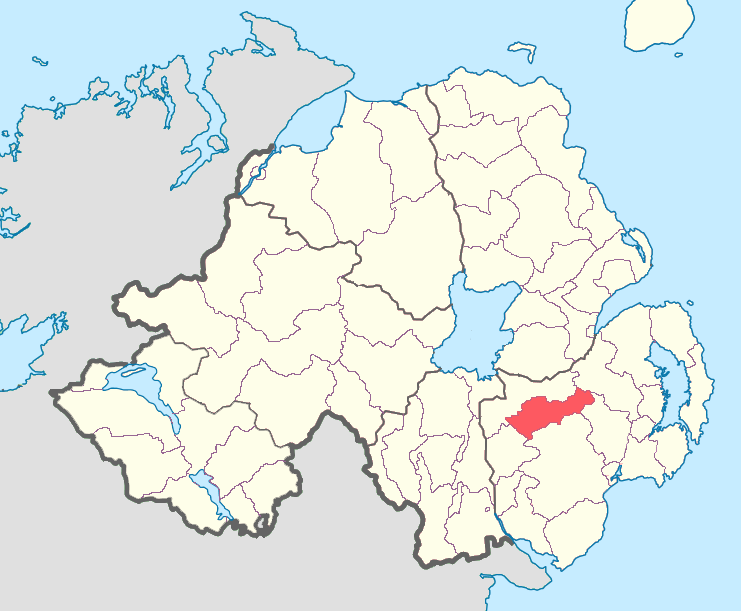
- Location of Iveagh Lower, Upper Half, County Down, Northern Ireland.
- Sovereign state: United Kingdom
- Country: Northern Ireland
- County: Down

Iveagh Lower, Upper Half is a barony in County Down, Northern Ireland. It was created by 1851 with the division of the barony of Iveagh Lower into two. It is bordered by five other baronies: Iveagh Upper, Lower Half to the south; Iveagh Upper, Upper Half to the south-west; Iveagh Lower, Lower Half to the west and north; Castlereagh Upper to the north-east; and Kinelarty to the west.

== List of settlements ==
Below is a list of the villages and population centres in Iveagh Lower, Upper Half:

=== Large villages ===
- Hillsborough
- Moira
- Waringstown

=== Villages ===
- Blackskull
- Donaghcloney
- Gilford
- Lawrencetown
- Magheralin
- Ravernet

=== Hamlets and population centres ===
- Lenaderg
- Maze
- Waringsford

== List of civil parishes ==
Below is a list of civil parishes in Iveagh Lower, Upper Half:

- Blaris (also partly in baronies of Castlereagh Upper and Massereene Upper)
- Donaghcloney
- Donaghmore (two townlands, rest in barony of Iveagh Upper, Upper Half)
- Dromore (one townland, rest in barony of Iveagh Lower, Lower Half)
- Hillsborough
- Magheralin (also partly in barony of Oneilland East (three townlands))
- Magherally (one townland, rest in barony of Iveagh Lower, Lower Half)
- Moira (also partly in barony of Iveagh Upper, Upper Half (one townland))
- Seapatrick (also partly in baronies of Iveagh Lower, Lower Half and Iveagh Upper, Upper Half)
- Shankill (one townland, rest in barony of Oneilland East)
- Tullylish (also partly in barony of Iveagh Lower, Lower Half (one townland))
