= Garvaghy (civil parish) =

Civil parish in County Down, Northern Ireland

Garvaghy is a civil parish in County Down, Northern Ireland. It is situated in the historic baronies of Iveagh Upper, Lower Half and Iveagh Lower, Lower Half. It is also a townland of 722 acres.

== Townlands ==
Garvaghy civil parish contains the following townlands:

- Ballooly
- Balloolymore
- Carnew
- Castlevennon
- Corbally
- Enagh
- Fedany
- Garvaghy
- Kilkinamurry
- Killaney
- Knockgorm
- Shanrod
- Tullinisky
- Tullyorior

== See also ==
- List of civil parishes of County Down
