= Ardkeen (civil parish) =

Civil parish in County Down, Northern Ireland

Coordinates: 52.2447°N 7.0869°W

Ardkeen (from Irish Ard Caoin 'Fair/Pleasant Height') is a civil parish and townland (of 461 acres) in County Down, Northern Ireland. It is situated in the historic barony of Ards Upper.

== Townlands ==
Ardkeen civil parish contains the following townlands:

- Ardkeen
- Ballycran Beg
- Ballycran More
- Ballygelagh
- Ballyward
- Bird Island
- Calf Island
- Cookstown
- Craigaveagh Rock
- Drummond Island
- Dunevly
- Great Minnis's Island
- Inishanier Island
- Inisharoan Island
- Kirkistown
- Lisbane
- Little Minnis's Island
- Long Island
- Lythe Rock
- Parton Island
- Pherson's Island
- Rainey Island
- Ratallagh
- Roe Island
- Round Island
- Sketrick Island
- Trasnagh Island

== See also ==
- List of civil parishes of County Down
