= Orior Upper =

Orior Upper Na hOirthir Uachtaracha(Irish)
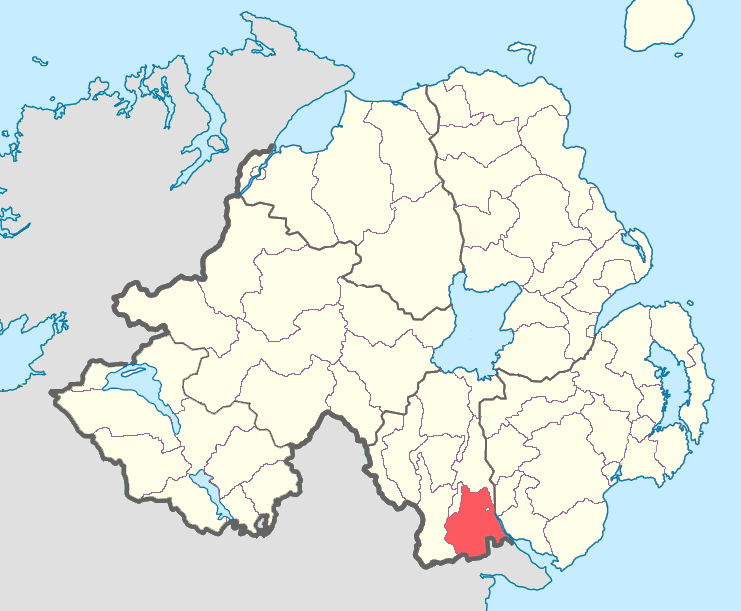
- Location of Orior Upper, County Armagh, Northern Ireland.
- Sovereign state: United Kingdom
- Country: Northern Ireland
- County: Armagh

Orior Upper (from Irish: Airthir, the name of an ancient Gaelic territory) is a barony in County Armagh, Northern Ireland. It lies in the south-east of the county and borders the Republic of Ireland with its southern boundary. It is bordered by five other baronies in Northern Ireland: Fews Upper and an enclave of Fews Lower to the west; Orior Lower to the north; Iveagh Upper, Upper Half to its west, which is divided in two by the Lordship of Newry. It also borders two baronies in the Republic of Ireland: Dundalk Lower and Dundalk Upper to the south.

== List of settlements ==
Below is a list of settlements in Orior Upper:

=== Villages ===
- Belleek
- Camlough

=== Population centres ===
- Forkhill (also part in the barony of Orior Lower)
- Jerrettspass (also part in the barony of Orior Lower)
- Jonesborough
- Kingsmills
- Loughgilly (also part in the baronies of Fews Lower and Orior Lower)

== List of civil parishes ==
Below is a list of civil parishes in Orior Upper:

- Forkhill
- Jonesborough
- Killevy (split with the barony of Orior Lower)
- Loughgilly (split with the baronies of Fews Lower and Orior Lower)
- Newry (also partly in baronies of Lordship of Newry, Oneilland West and Iveagh Upper, Lower Half)
