= Portavogie =

Coastal village on the Ards Peninsula, Northern Ireland

Coordinates: 54.462°N 5.444°W

Portavogie: Irish: Port a' Bhogaigh
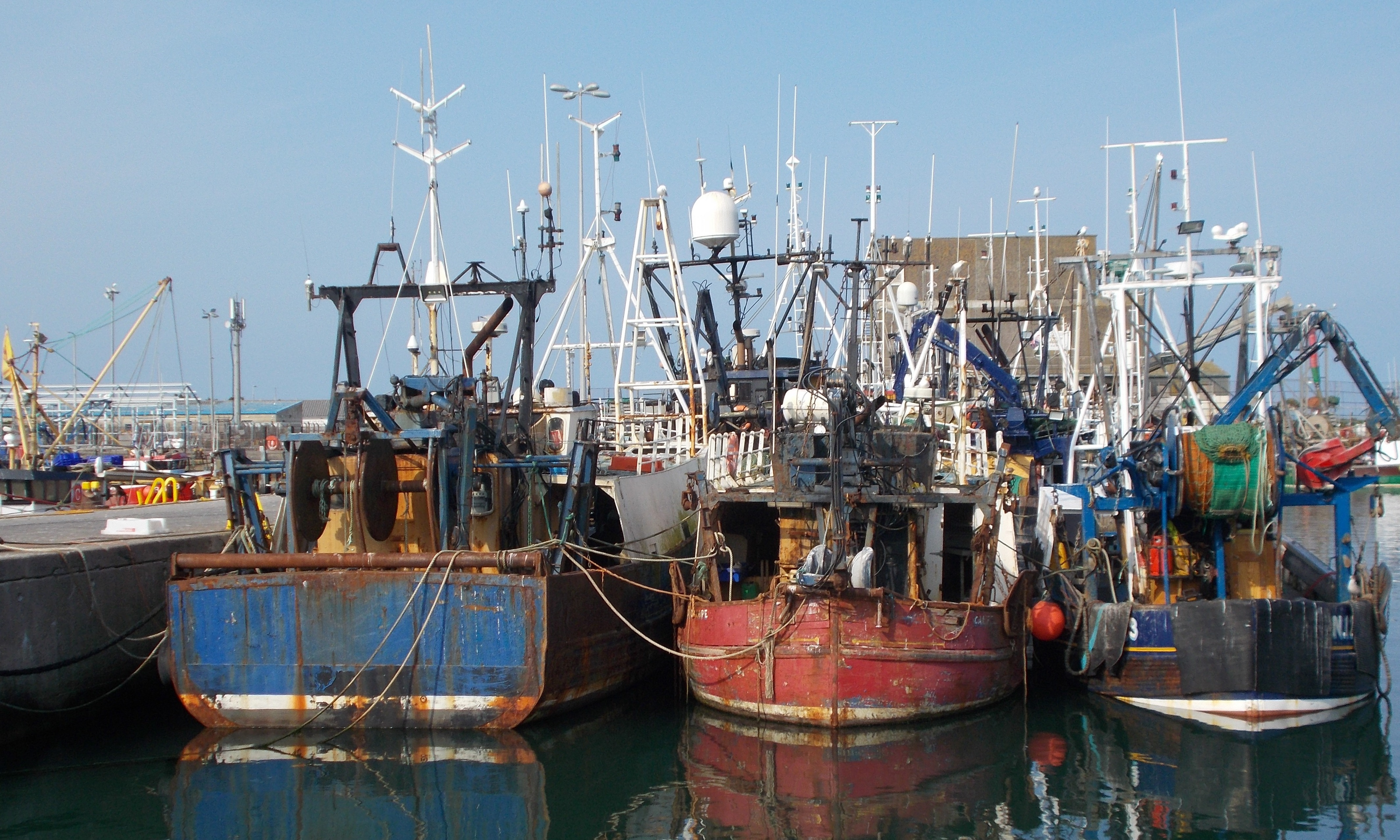
- Portavogie harbour

- Location within County Down
- Population: 2,122 (2011 Census)
- District: Ards and North Down Borough
- County: County Down
- Country: Northern Ireland
- Sovereign state: United Kingdom
- Post town: NEWTOWNARDS
- Postcode district: BT22
- Dialling code: 028
- UK Parliament: Strangford
- NI Assembly: Strangford

Portavogie (from Irish Port a' Bhogaigh 'harbour of the bog') is a village, townland and fishing port in County Down, Northern Ireland. It lies within the Ards and North Down Borough and is the easternmost settlement in Ireland. It had a population of 2,122 people in the 2011 Census.

The town has a modern harbour, housing a large fishing fleet catching mainly prawns and herrings. Most evenings there are fish auctions on the quays. Three murals on the exterior of the local primary school celebrate the history of the fishing industry in the town.

== History ==
In about 1555 there was a settlement at Stable Hole to the north of where Portavogie now stands, at the bottom of what is now the Warnocks Road. The site was chosen for the shelter provided by the surrounding rocks and the sandy shore on which the inhabitants could beach their boats; they existed on what they could grow and catch. This was the first settled area south of Ballyhalbert (Talbot's Town) and in the main the inhabitants were families of fishermen who had travelled from across the Irish Sea from the Solway Coast. In those days the Ardes was an area of marsh land and bog and was in a world of its own to the rest of Ireland. Public records from 1620 name the area as Portabogagh from the Irish Port a' Bhogaigh. In time this became Portavogie, this spelling first recorded in 1810. (Note on pronunciation: Bhogaigh, the bh is pronounced as a v and the gh is silent, thus it would be pronounced as vogie).

With no strategic benefit in developing Portavogie the Anglo-Normans ignored the immediate area and concentrated on developing the castles at Quintin, Ardkeen, Portaferry and Ballygalget. The entrance to Strangford Lough became a strategic defence area and was rich in seafish providing a ready source of food.

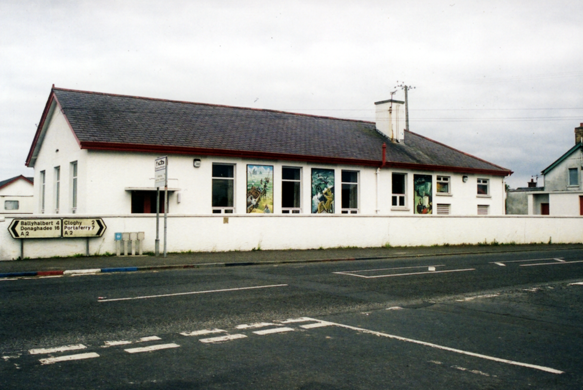
Mural depicting fishing history on the side of Portavogie School. Commissioned by Ards Arts in 2001 by artists Gary Drostle and Rob Turner.

Portavogie was protected from the east by the Irish Sea and to the west by the "Bogs", an area still known as that today. The route north to Newtownards was low lying and subject to regular flooding at spring tide. At one time there were 82 windmills the length of the Ards Peninsula; this must have looked as the Netherlands does today and probably gave rise to the epithet "Little Holland". The Savage family had controlled the Ards from around 1200 but did little to improve the area, instead concentrating on securing their ownership and defences.

The Church of Ireland was the Established church at this time (disestablished in 1871) and the area around Portavogie was known as the Parish of Ballyhalbert or St. Andrews Parish. The other townlands part of the Parish were: Ballyfrench, Ballyhalbert, Roddens, Echlinville, Ballyhemlin, Ballygraffin and Ballyeasborough – the site of St. Andrews Parish Church. Portavogie was in the main a Presbyterian village. Many of the fishermen who settled here were "Covenanters" who had come from Scotland to escape the then persecution.

In 1735 Charles Echlin bought Rhuban House from the Reverend Hugh Maxwell and changed the name of the immediate area to Echlinville. The Echlins were Anglo-Normans and at this time also had lands in the Kingdom of Fife, Scotland, an area to the north of Edinburgh. The Echlins had been gifted "Savage" land by the crown as a reward for services rendered and they set about the task of draining the "Bogs" of the Ardes. A contribution that can be seen today in the quality of the fertile arable land of the "Bogs". The area is once again known as Rubane.

The past 50 years has seen enormous changes in the look of the village. The rebuilding of the harbour from a "pretty", safe anchorage to the modern look of today's industrial facility is progress, although one could be forgiven for thinking otherwise.

In 1900 there were 18 family names associated with Portavogie: Adair, Pyper, Warnock, Boyd, Rutherford, Lawson, Ambrose, Thompson, McKee, Clint, Hughes, Cully, Edmund, Palmer, Young, McVea, McClements and Coffey. Many of these family lines have continued to this day and the list of names of Portavogie residents grows ever longer.

In 1985 Princess Anne, Mrs. Mark Phillips, visited the village to officially open the new harbour and was received by the local community, she toured the fishing boat "Willing Lad" accompanied by its skipper, James McClements. In 1999 she (now The Princess Royal) revisited the village and opened the new Community centre on New Harbour Road.

Portavogie had the honour, on 12 July 2008, of holding the annual band parade which was attended by a large number of people.

Portavogie Rangers hold an annual football tournament called the George Best Trophy in memory of the former Man Utd and Northern Ireland striker. They also hold a five a side tournament on the eleventh of July every year.

=== The Troubles ===
During the period known as The Troubles there were two deaths in and near the village of Portavogie. These deaths were on separate occasions.

1973

- 3 April 1973 – David McQueen (28), a Protestant civilian was shot and killed by a non-specific Loyalist group at the side of the road, near Portavogie, County Down.

1993

- 5 April 1993 – William Killen (36), an ex-member of the Ulster Defence Association (UDA), was shot dead in his bed by the Ulster Defence Association (UDA) while at his home, Westlea Gardens, Portavogie, County Down during an internal UDA dispute.

== Demography ==
=== 2011 Census ===
In the 2011 Census Portavogie had a population of 2,122 people (833 households).

=== 2001 Census ===
The population of Portavogie on Census day (29 April 2001) was 1594 people. Therefore, it is classed as a village as it has a population of 1,000 people or more and is less than 2,250 people. The demographic characteristics of the people living in Portavogie was as follows:

- 20.4% were aged under 16 years;
- 18.4% were aged 60 and over;
- the average age was 37.9 years (NI average age 35.8 years);
- 49.9% of the population were male and 50.1% were female;
- 2.4% were from a Catholic Community Background;
- 95.9% were from a 'Protestant and Other Christian (including Christian related)' Community Background;
- 4.4% were born outside Northern Ireland; and
- 0.2% were from an ethnic group other than white.

== Sport ==
Portavogie Rangers Football Club, are based in Portavogie. They play at New Harbour Road, and are in the Northern Amateur Football League.

== Education ==
Portavogie has one primary school and nursery.

== See also ==
- List of towns and villages in Northern Ireland
