= Magheralin =

Village in County Down, Northern Ireland

Coordinates: 54°28′N 6°16′W

Magheralin: Irish: Machaire Lainne
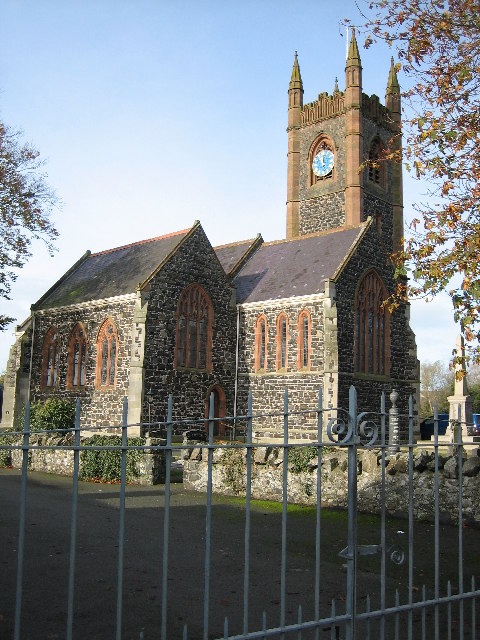
- Magheralin Parish Church

- Location within County Down
- Population: 2,041
- District: Armagh City, Banbridge and Craigavon
- County: County Down
- Country: Northern Ireland
- Sovereign state: United Kingdom
- Post town: CRAIGAVON
- Postcode district: BT67
- Police: Northern Ireland
- Fire: Northern Ireland
- Ambulance: Northern Ireland

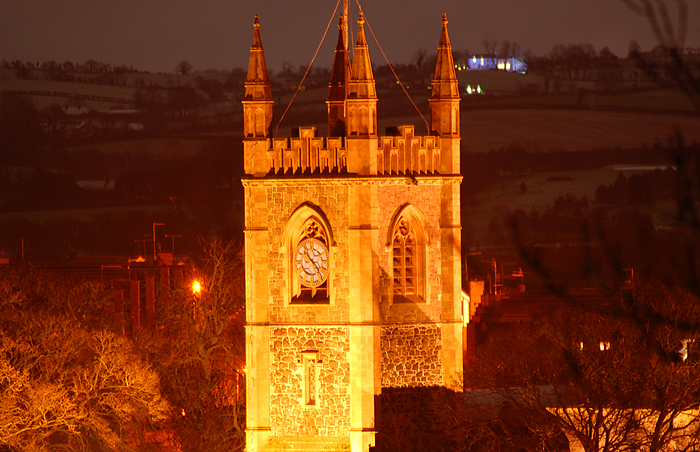
Magheralin Parish Church, The Church of the Holy and Undivided Trinity

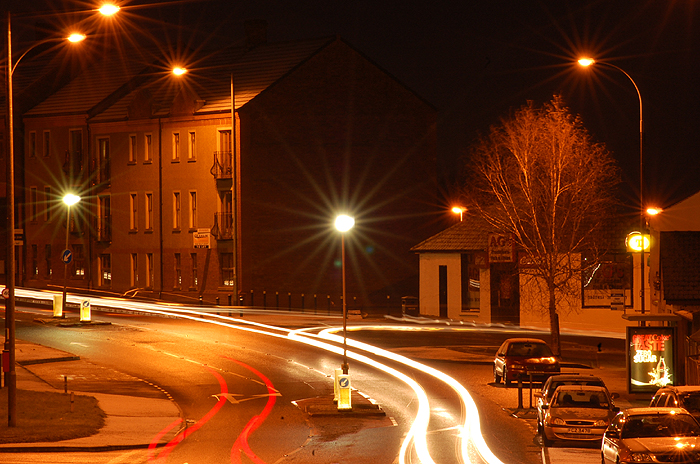
Magheralin at night

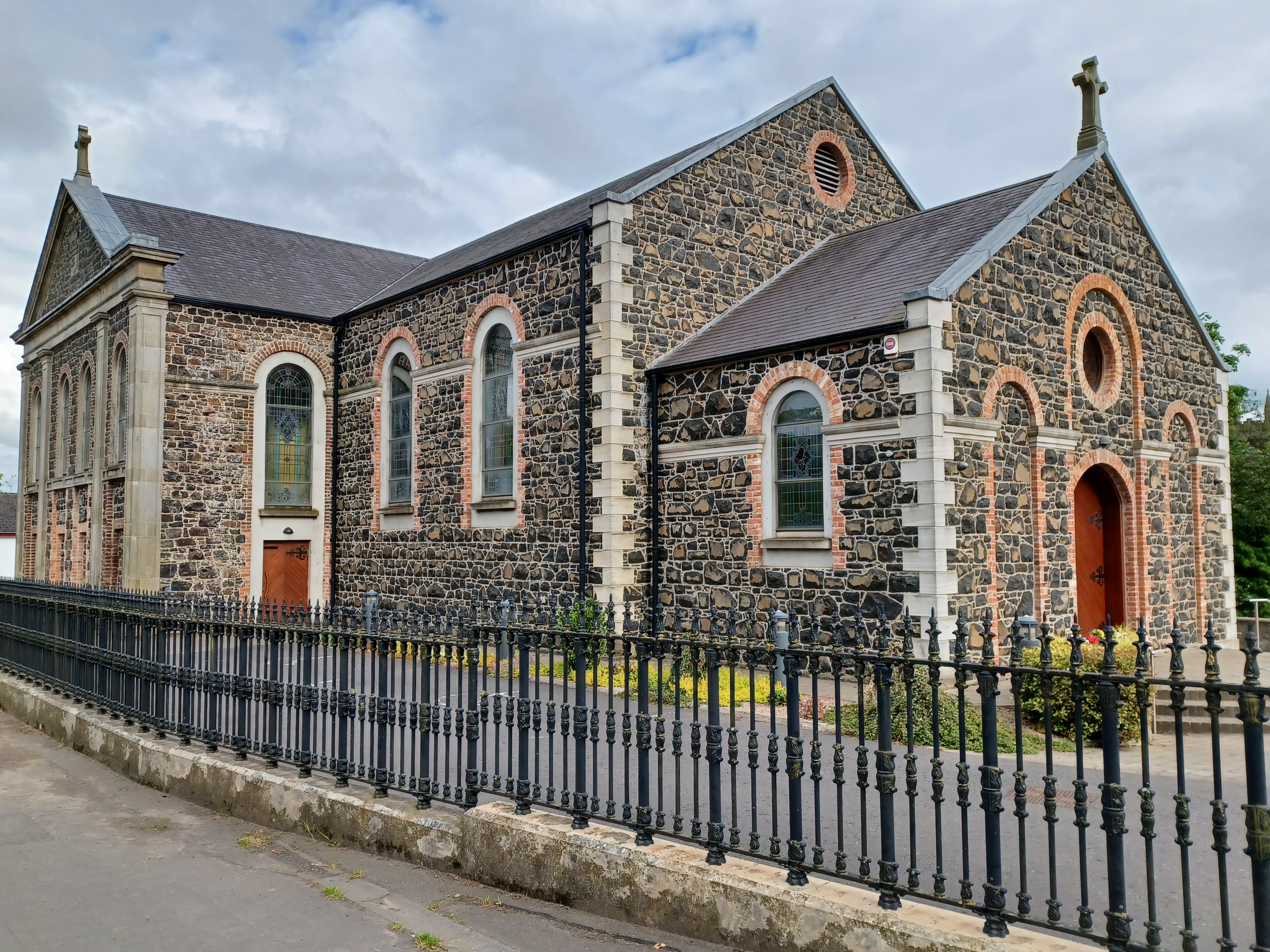
Parish of Magheralin, St. Patrick's & St. Ronan's

Magheralin (from Irish Machaire Lainne, meaning 'plain of the church') is a village and civil parish in County Down, Northern Ireland. It is on the main A3 road between Moira and Lurgan, beside the River Lagan. It had a population of 2,041 people in the 2021 census. The civil parish of Magheralin covers an area of County Down.

Its original name was Lann Rónáin Fhinn, "church of Ronan Finn", a saint from the medieval Irish tale Buile Shuibhne (The Madness of Sweeney).

== Culture ==
=== Religion ===
Magheralin has two churches, one Protestant and the other Catholic. The Protestant church has a second church building in Dollingstown. The Catholic church also has a second church building, located in Moira.

=== The Ducks of Magheralin ===
There is an old song called "The Ducks of Magheralin". The Ducks of Magheralin is an Irish Polka, with its namesake representing the 'ducks of Magheralin', who were the weavers of the town because they used duck grease to lubricate their looms. In the preface to a well-known version by the Glenfolk Four, the singers insist that the intent of the song is to address the "myth" that the capital of Ireland is Dublin. The first verse is as follows:

It is just about a year ago that I went to see the King/Queen,
And on my voyage in Ulster my troubles they were twin;
He/She decorated me with medals, and they were made of tin,
"Go home," says he/she, "you skitter ye. You're the Mayor of Magheralin."

=== Education ===
Magheralin has two primary schools: Maralin Village Primary School and St. Patrick's Primary School.

== The Troubles ==
During the period of The Troubles (1960s–1998), a number of incidents occurred in the area. On 18 October 1989, Robert Metcalfe, a 40-year-old Protestant civilian, was shot and killed by the Provisional Irish Republican Army while at his home in Drumnabreeze Road, Magheralin. And, in January 1991, Jervis Lynch, a 26-year-old Catholic civilian, was shot and killed by the Ulster Volunteer Force (UVF) while at his home in Acres Road, Magheralin.

== Sports ==
St. Michael's GAC is a Gaelic football club with its playing field in Magheralin.

Magheralin also has a football club, Magheralin Village F.C., they play in the Mid Ulster Football League.

Daniel Wiffen, an Irish professional swimmer from Magheralin, broke the 800m freestyle short-course world record on 10 December 2023 in Romania, becoming the first Irish swimmer to break a swimming world record. Representing Ireland, he won the gold medal in the 800m Freestyle final in the Paris Olympics on 30 July 2024, setting a new Olympic record.

== 2021 census ==
Magheralin is classified as a village by the Northern Ireland Statistics and Research Agency (NISRA) (i.e with a population between 1,000 and 2,250 people). On census day (21 March 2021) there were 2,041 people living in Magheralin. Of these:

- 24% were aged 0-14, 36% were aged 15-39, 28% were aged 40-64, and 12% were aged 65 and above
- 49% were male and 51% were female
- 98% spoke English as a main language, 5% had some knowledge of Irish and 7% had some ability in Ulster Scots
- 27% were Catholic, 11% were Presbyterian, 25% were Anglican (Church of Ireland), 2% were Methodist, 11% adhered to other Christian denominations, <1% followed other religions and 23% followed no religion or did not state their religion
- 98% were white and 2% were of another ethnic group
- 38% identified as British only, 15% identified as Irish only, 25% identified as Northern Irish only, <1% identified as British and Irish only, 13% identified as British and Northern Irish only, 2% identified as Irish and Northern Irish only, 2% identified as British, Irish and Northern Irish only and 5% identified with another nationality
- 58% held a UK passport only, 17% held an Ireland passport only, 8% held both UK and Ireland passports, 2% held other passport(s) and 16% held no passport
- 90% were born in Northern Ireland, 5% were born in England, <1% were born in Scotland, <1% were born in Wales, 2% were born in the Republic of Ireland and 3% were born in other countries

== Notable people ==
- Peter Brush (1901–1984), a soldier, Northern Irish unionist politician and paramilitary leader, lived in the area.
- Robert William Radclyffe Dolling, "Father Dolling" (1851–1902), was born in Magheralin.
- John Macoun (1831–1920), a Canadian naturalist born, to James Macoun and Anne Jane Nevin and who emigrated to Canada in 1850, was born in Magheralin.
- Daniel Wiffen (born 2001), an Irish Olympic gold medal swimmer, is from Magheralin.

== See also ==
- Magheralin (civil parish)
- List of villages in Northern Ireland
