= Dromara =

Village in County Down, Northern Ireland

Coordinates: 54.379858°N 6.017976°W

Dromara: Irish: Droim mBearach
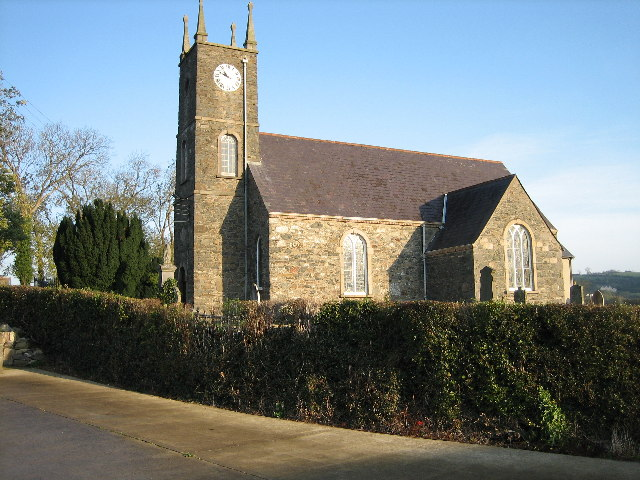
- St John's Church, Dromara

- Location within County Down
- Population: 1,118 (2021 census)
- Irish grid reference: J287497
  - Belfast: 20 mi (32 km)
- District: Lisburn and Castlereagh
- County: County Down
- Country: Northern Ireland
- Sovereign state: United Kingdom
- Post town: DROMORE
- Postcode district: BT25
- Dialling code: 028
- UK Parliament: Lagan Valley
- NI Assembly: Lagan Valley

Dromara (from Irish Droim mBearach, meaning 'ridge of heifers') is a village and a townland (of 242 acres) in County Down, Northern Ireland. It is in the civil parish of Dromara and the historic barony of Iveagh Lower, Lower Half. It lies 10 kilometres (6.2 mi) to the southwest of Ballynahinch on the northern slopes of Slieve Croob, with the River Lagan flowing through it. In the 2021 census it had a population of 1,118 people.

== History ==
There have been references to a church at Dromara since about 1306. Earlier anglicised names for the church and townland include Drummeragh, Drumaragh and Drumara—these are likely derived from Druim mBearach (modern Irish Droim mBearach) meaning "ridge of heifers". Saint John's Church now occupies the site of the original church. Dromara eventually became a small mill village and although many of its buildings date from the early 19th century, the street pattern suggests that the settlement has a much earlier history. It used to have its own court and market house and a market place at the road junction in the middle of the village.

== Facilities ==
Facilities in the village include Dromara Primary School, two churches (St John's Church of Ireland and Dromara Second Presbyterian Church).

== Places of interest ==
- Legannany Dolmen, a prehistoric three legged 'giants grave' is just outside the village.
- Binder's Cove – a rediscovered souterrain near Finnis, Dromara. Finnis Souterrain (a scheduled ancient monument) is known locally as 'Binders Cove'. Although the first recorded discovery of Binder's Cove was in the 18th century, it actually dates back to the 9th century. Souterrains were "underground stone lined tunnels". Because there was much clann feuding and raiding from foreign invaders such as the Vikings in the Early Christian period, souterrains are thought to have been places of refuge for the occupants of the monastery or its attached enclosure. They may also have been 'safes' where valuable gold and silver religious artefacts were kept. As they were dark, cold and dry, food might also have been stored in them.

== Sport ==
Dromara Village F.C. play association football in the Northern Amateur Football League.

== People ==
- Eileen Bell CBE, 2nd Speaker of the Northern Ireland Assembly, MLA for North Down and former Alliance deputy leader, born in Dromara in 1943.
- Harry Ferguson, inventor of the modern gearbox and the 'Ferguson' Tractor, was born near Dromara.
- Hugh Hanna, nicknamed 'Roaring Hanna', Presbyterian minister, born in Dromara in 1821.

== Demography ==
At the 2011 census there were 1,006 people living in Dromara. Of these:

- 25.45% were aged under 16 years and 12.03 were aged 65 and over
- 48.01% of the population were male and 51.99% were female
- 21.77% were from a Catholic background and 68.99% were from a Protestant and Other Christian background
- 4.45% of people aged 16–74 were unemployed

== See also ==
- List of townlands of County Down
- Dromara (civil parish)
- Market houses in Northern Ireland
