= Lordship of Newry =

Barony in County Down, Northern Ireland

Lordship of Newry is a historic barony in County Down, Northern Ireland.

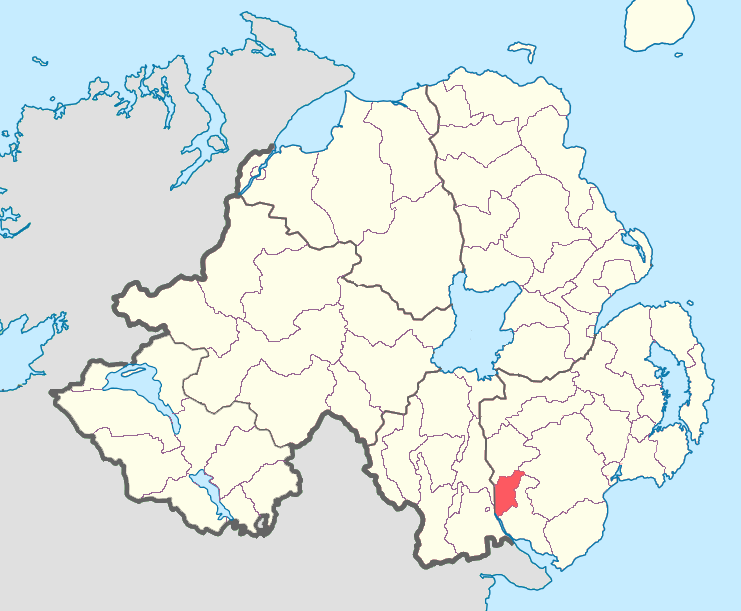
Map with the Lordship of Newry

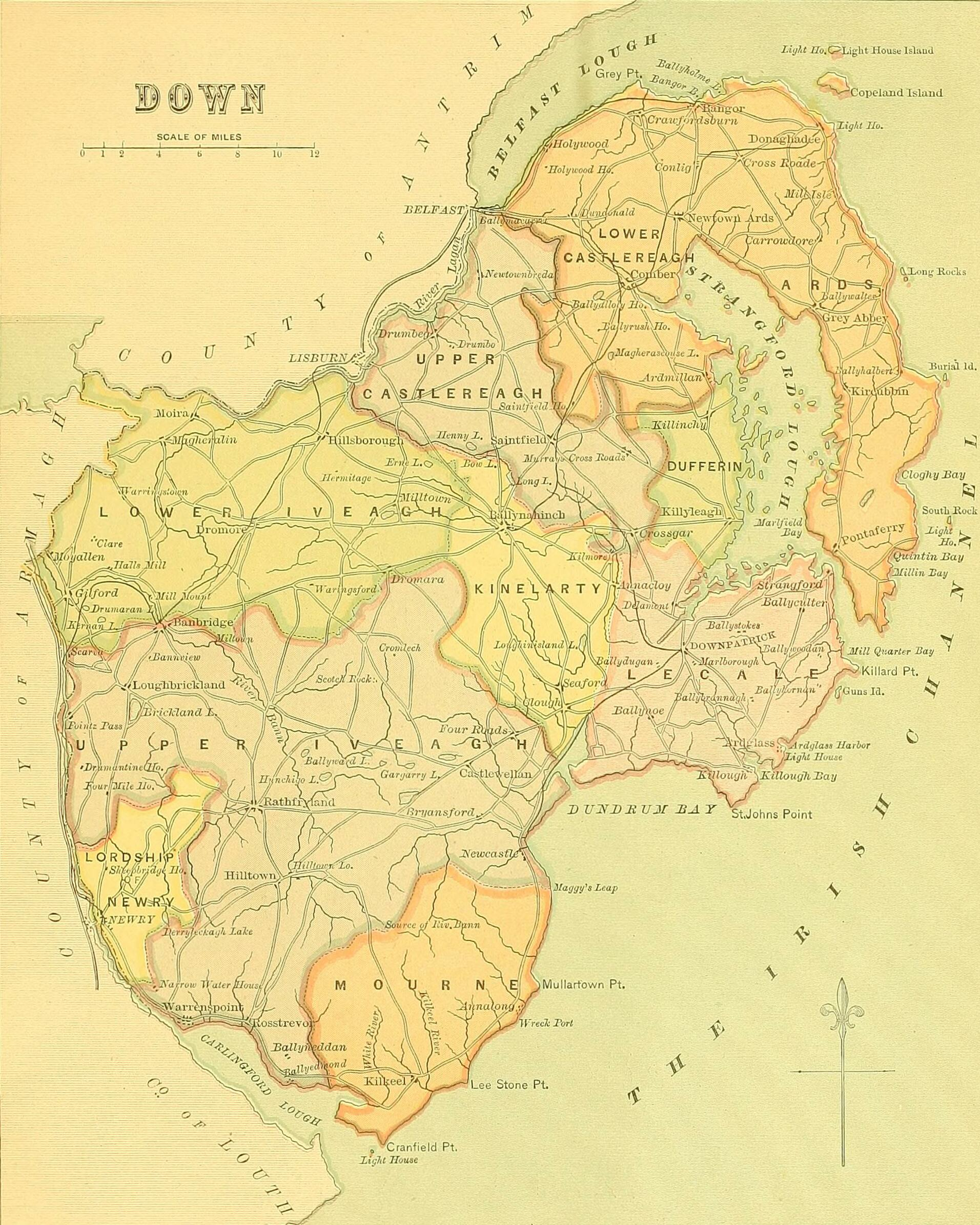
A map of baronies in County Down with the Lordship of Newry in the south west

== Settlements ==
Below is a list of settlements in Lordship of Newry:

- Newry

== Civil parishes ==
Below is a list of civil parishes in Lordship of Newry:

- Newry (also partly in baronies of Iveagh Upper, Lower Half, Oneilland West and Orior Upper)
