= Banbridge railway station =

Railway station in Northern Ireland

Coordinates: 54.3526°N 6.2725°W

Banbridge
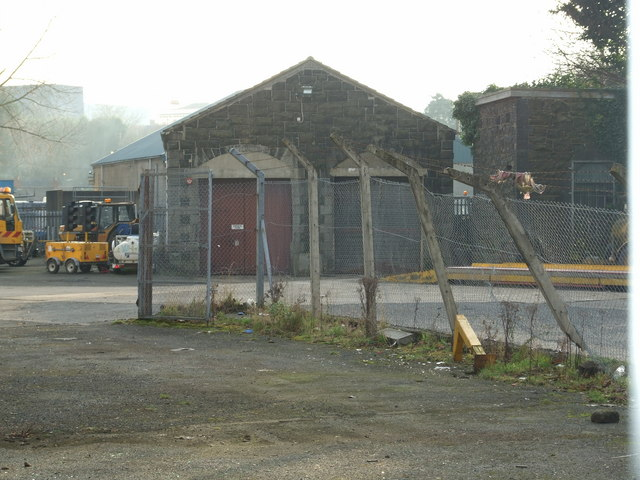
- Former Engine Shed now used by Ulsterbus, whose depot is on the site of the now demolished station. Photograph taken 17 December 2007

General information
- Location: Huntly Road; Banbridge, County Down; Northern Ireland

Other information
- Status: Disused

History
- Original company: Banbridge, Lisburn and Belfast Railway; Banbridge Junction Railway
- Pre-grouping: Great Northern Railway (Ireland)
- Post-grouping: Great Northern Railway (Ireland)

Key dates
- 23 March 1859: Station opens
- 13 July 1863: Station relocated after the BLBR extends
- 2 May 1955: Services to Scarva and Newcastle cease
- 30 April 1956: Station closes
Location
- Location within Northern Ireland Location within the United Kingdom

Banbridge railway station was on the Banbridge Junction Railway and Banbridge, Lisburn and Belfast Railway which ran from Knockmore Junction to Banbridge in Northern Ireland.

== History ==
The first Banbridge station was opened by the Banbridge Junction Railway on 23 March 1859.

The nearby Banbridge, Lisburn and Belfast Railway was opened on 1 August 1863 with their own station for Banbridge, resulting in the former station closing in October that year. The station was later part of the once extensive Great Northern Railway (Ireland) system that connected to Scarva, Lisburn and Newcastle.

The Great Northern Railway Board closed the Scarva and Newcastle branches on 2 May 1955 and then the remaining line to Lisburn on 30 April 1956, almost a year later. The lines in the town had been lifted by September 1959. The engine shed is now used by Ulsterbus as a bus depot.

== Railway Revival ==
Northern Ireland Railways are planning to reopen railway lines in Northern Ireland, which includes the branch from Lisburn to Banbridge to ease congestion of the Belfast-Newry line, which would reintroduce rail services to the town as well as in Dromore and Hillsborough.

== Services ==
Preceding station	Historical railways	Following station
Mullafernaghan	Banbridge, Lisburn and Belfast Railway; Knockmore Junction-Banbridge	Terminus
Smyth's Siding	Banbridge Junction Railway; Scarva-Banbridge	Terminus
Terminus	Great Northern Railway (Ireland); Banbridge-Castlewellan	Corbet
	Proposed Services	
Hillsborough	All-Island Strategic Rail Review; Lisburn-Newry Line	Newry
