= Benraw =

Coordinates: 54.302°N 6.010°W

Benraw: Irish: Beann Rátha
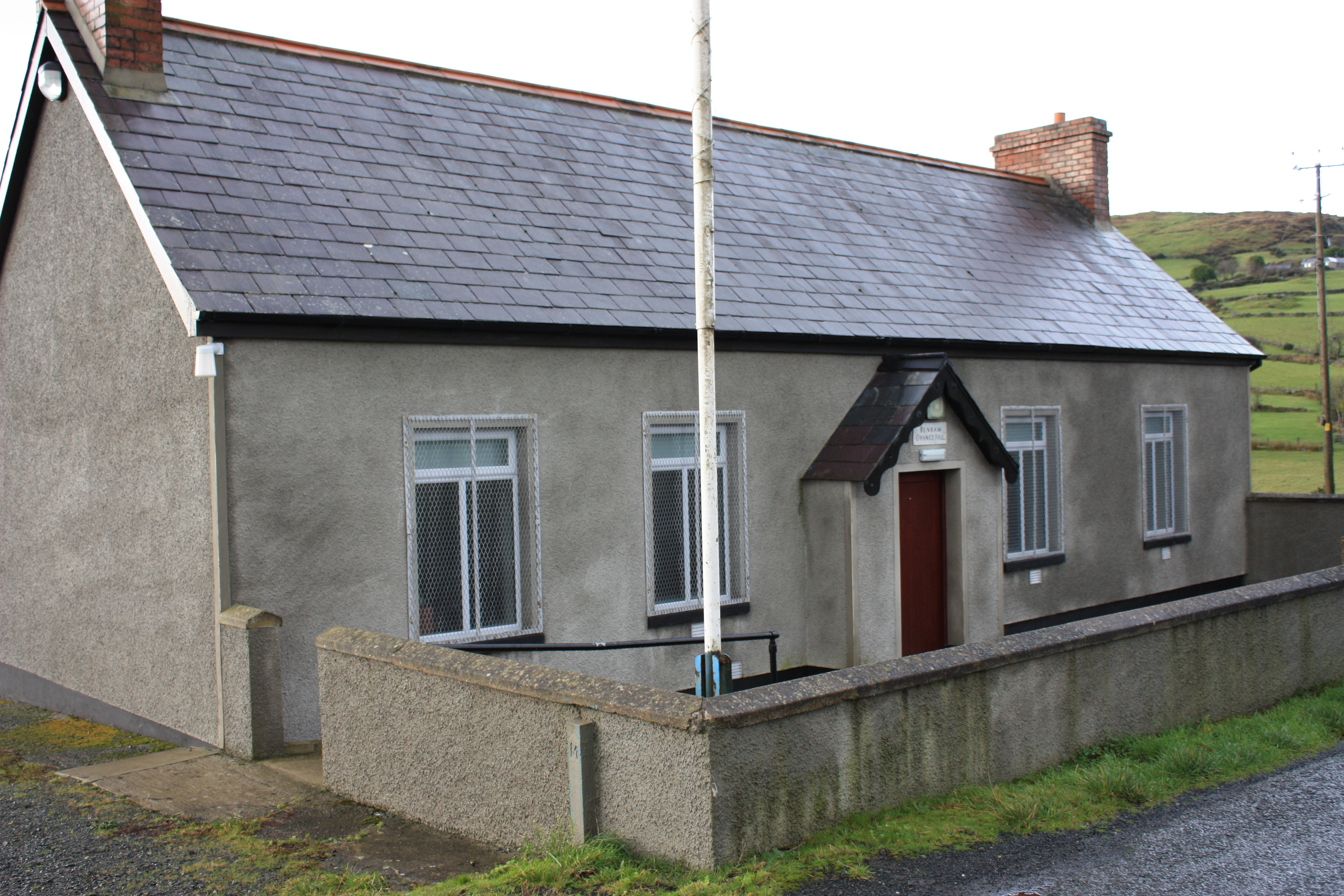
- Benraw Orange Hall in 2009

- Location within County Down
- County: County Down
- Country: Northern Ireland
- Sovereign state: United Kingdom
- Postcode district: BT31
- Dialling code: 028

Benraw (from Irish Beann Rátha, meaning 'peak of the ring-fort') is a townland of 860 acres in County Down, Northern Ireland, two miles north of Leitrim and six miles from Castlewellan. It is situated in the civil parish of Drumgooland and the historic barony of Iveagh Upper, Lower Half. It is set in the middle of the Dromara Hills and Slieve Croob. It has an average population of 50 people. It contains two roads: the Whitehill Road and the Benraw Road. It is in the middle of the townlands Leitrim, Legananny and Derryneill. It is a very mountainous area and the two main mountains in Benraw are Benraw Mountain and The Whitehill. Benraw is also close to Legananny Dolmen.

== History ==
The townland of Benraw has clearly been named after the hill now known as Benraw Mountain (242m). There is no fort in Benraw, but a slightly less than semi-circular arc remains on a ridge, formed by an inner ditch with outer bank, on what could have been a suitable site for a ringfort.

== See also ==
- List of townlands in County Down
