= Dechomet =

Village in County Down, Northern Ireland

Coordinates: 54.3024183°N 6.0672403°W

Dechomet: Irish: Deachoimheád
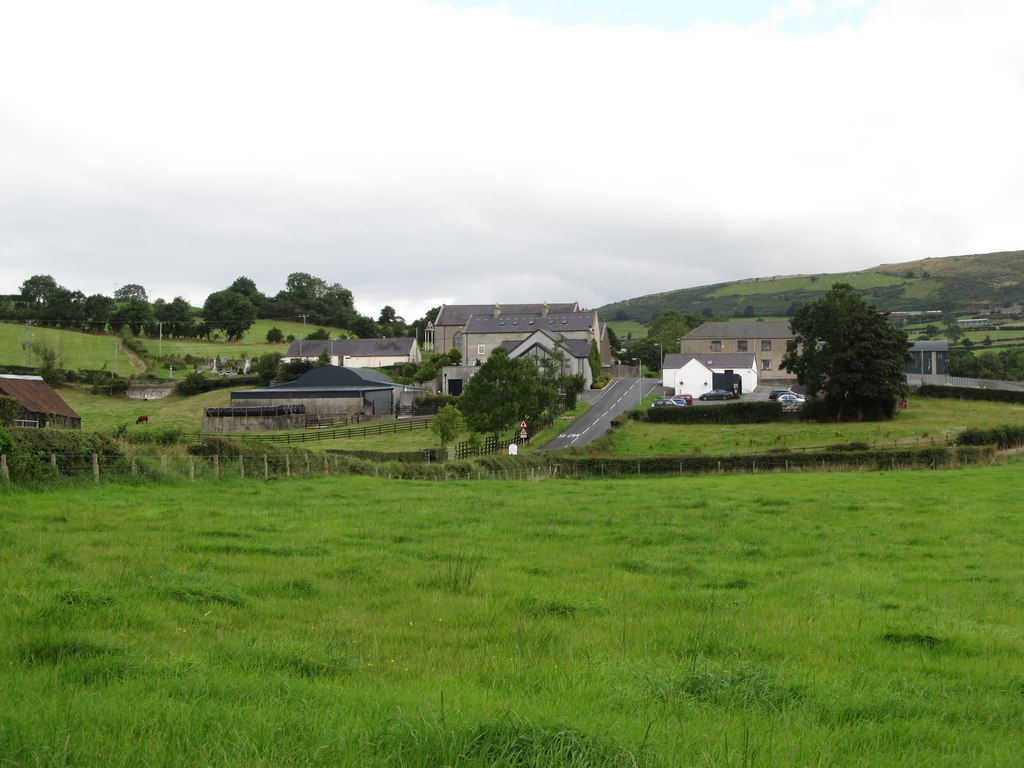
- The village of Dechomet from the south

- Location within County Down
- Population: 121 (Includes other nearby settlements.) (2001 Census)
- District: Newry, Mourne and Down
- County: County Down
- Country: Northern Ireland
- Sovereign state: United Kingdom
- Post town: CASTLEWELLAN
- Postcode district: BT31
- Dialling code: 028
- Police: Northern Ireland
- Fire: Northern Ireland
- Ambulance: Northern Ireland
- UK Parliament: South Down
- NI Assembly: South Down

Dechomet or Deehommed (from Irish Deachoimheád, meaning 'Good view'; /deɪˈkɒmɛt/) (formerly Lowtown) is a small settlement in Drumgooland, County Down, Northern Ireland. Dechomet is approximately 3 miles from Leitrim and approximately 6 miles from Castlewellan.

In the 2001 census, Dechomet, Ballyward and Finnis had a combined population of 121.

Dechomet contains a primary school, a hardware store, a bar and a Catholic church within the village centre.

== Name ==
=== Toponymy ===
The name "Dechomet" is Goidelic in origin and derives from the Ulster Irish Deachoimheád, a compound of the prefix dea- meaning "good" or "fine", and coimheád meaning "view", "lookout", or "watch". Together, the name has been interpreted as "good view" or "fine lookout", referring to the wide vantage point overlooking the Mourne Mountains from the slopes of Deehommed Mountain. However, Patrick Weston Joyce also suggested that the name could refer to a "good reconnoitering station", reflecting the use of elevated landmarks as military lookout posts during the early Middle Ages. (Note: To illustrate how such sites were used, Joyce referred to early Irish accounts such as the 7th-century Battle of Moyrath, where scouts ascended designated hills to survey opposing forces and arrange troop formations.)

=== Usage ===
The townland is recorded as Dicovott in Pender's Census of Ireland of 1659. The settlement was also formerly known as Lowtown, an English name recorded as the local area associated with Deehommed townland in the Ulster Historical Foundation's list of unofficial local placenames. Lowtown has largely decreased in usage in favour of the native name Dechomet, the name generally used for official documentation of the settlement.

== History ==
=== Early history ===
The northwestern Drumgooland area contains evidence of prehistoric settlement, including early Bronze age remains in the nearby townland of Closkelt. An ancient church of pre-Reformation origins and burial ground formerly stood at Dechomet. The site was recorded in the nineteenth century, when the church was already stated to have been in ruins. The burial ground was in ruins by 1657 and an associated stone cross was thrown down in 1744.

The former church at Dechomet was reportedly destroyed during the Cromwellian period. Mass was subsequently celebrated at outdoor sites elsewhere in the parish, including mass rocks at Ballymagreehan, Backaderry and inside the ringfort at Rathmore, Magheramayo.

=== Population ===
The townland of Deehommed (Containing but not solely consisting of Dechomet) first appears on Pender's Census of Ireland in 1659 in which the townland was described as containing 20 Irish families and no "English/Scotts" families. Drumgooland was divided into Upper and Lower Drumgooland in 1784. Lower Drumgooland comprised thirteen townlands, including Deehommed. In the 1841 census, Deehommed had a population of 780, making it the most populous townland in Lower Drumgooland. During the 1830s, average attendance at Mass in the townland was approximately 600. The settlement developed around a crossroads linking it with surrounding townlands.

=== St Mary's Church and Primary School ===
St Mary's Chapel, Dechomet, 2014

A Catholic chapel, described as a "plain" rectangular building, was erected at Dechomet in 1803 by Rev. Bernard Magennis and renovated in 1808 under Rev. Peter McCarthy. A larger church was begun between 1822 and 1832 by Rev. Thomas McKay and completed by his successor, Rev. Patrick Morgan, in 1835. It was dedicated by Bishop Blake on 2 October that year and became known as the Church of St Mary of the Angels.

A plot beside the church was purchased in 1848 for use as a burial ground. Before its acquisition, parishioners had been buried in the old Drumgooland cemetery. The church underwent extensive renovations in 1971, including alterations to the sanctuary and the installation of a new organ and seating. It was rededicated by Bishop Eugene O'Doherty on 14 November 1971.

A school was established at Dechomet in the 1830s. Differing sources establish it's presence at the crossroads, stating it's construction happened either shortly before 1832 or by 1834. It came under the control of the National Education Board in 1837, and an additional room was built in 1856. A new primary school, named St. Mary's, after the church, opened in 1965 and subsequently relocated from the crossroads to Closkelt Road in 1986.

=== Industry ===
The site of the former Dechomet Flax Mill

An iron deposit was worked on the northern side of Deehommed Mountain. Approximately 3,000 tons of ore were raised in 1874, however, the material was apparently not marketed. Further attempts to develop the deposit took place in 1900 and between 1937 and 1940. The deposit was also considered by the Ministry of Supply during the Second World War, but its development was not considered to justify public expenditure. In 1943, the government stated that the ore was too impure for steelmaking.

A flax mill was established south of the village in the 19th Century, along Church Hill, now Moneyslane Road. It used a nearby watercourse to power its operations. The mill was closed some time in the mid 20th Century.
