= Legananny =

Townland in County Down, Northern Ireland

Coordinates: 54°20′30″N 6°0′30″W

Legananny: Irish: Liagán Áine ‘pillar stone of the goddess Áine’
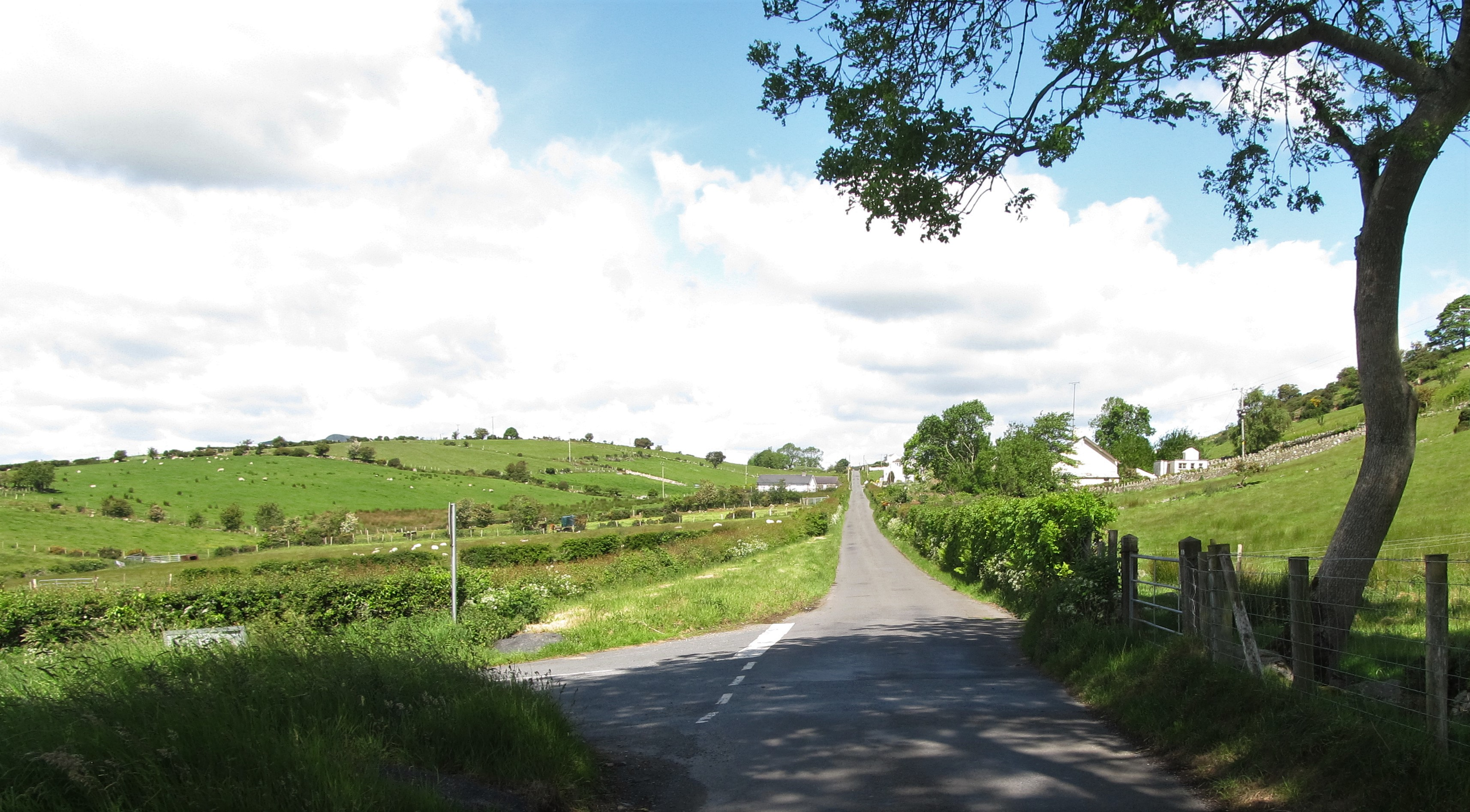
- View across Legananny

- Location within Northern Ireland Location within County Down Legananny (County Down)
- Irish grid reference: J292453
- District: Newry, Mourne and Down
- County: County Down
- Country: Northern Ireland
- Sovereign state: United Kingdom
- Post town: DROMARA
- Postcode district: BT25
- Dialling code: 028
- UK Parliament: South Down
- NI Assembly: South Down

Legananny (believed to derive from Irish: Liagán Áine, meaning "Áine's standing stone") is a townland located 5.6 km (3.5 mi) north of Leitrim in County Down, Northern Ireland. It covers approximately 7.8 km^{2} (1,918.23 acres). The townland lies within the civil parish of Drumgooland and the historic barony of Iveagh Upper, Lower Half. Legananny has a population of approximately 100 people, most of whom are farmers and their families.

== History ==
Legananny encompasses the summit of Cratlieve, which rises to 429 metres, although the mountain is not referenced in the townland's name. It is one of the larger townlands in the area and historically contained a graveyard.

The origin of the name Legananny has been subject to scholarly debate. One proposal suggests it derives from the Irish Lag an Eanaigh, meaning “hollow of the marsh,” a linguistically plausible interpretation. P.W. Joyce gives Lug an Eanaigh as the Irish form, though it may be more likely that the name originates from Liag an Eanaigh, referring to the prominent stone monument in the area. The English form “Legananny” more closely resembles liag (stone) than lug (hollow), lending weight to this alternative etymology. Furthermore, given the presence of a Neolithic portal tomb within the townland, another interpretation proposed by T.F. O’Rahilly suggests another possible origin for the name, Lagán Áine, meaning "little hollow of the goddess Áine." This is also supported by McKay who maintains that the name derives from Liagán Áine, meaning “pillar stone of the goddess Áine,” with liagán referring to a large stone or monolith and invoking mythological significance.

== Legananny Dolmen ==
Legananny Dolmen is a well-preserved portal tomb (or cromlech) which has stood for between 4,000 and 4,500 years on the southwestern slopes of Cratlieve Mountain (also known as Legananny Mountain), near the southern fringe of the Slieve Croob range, at an elevation of approximately 850 feet. The site offers extensive views across the surrounding countryside. The dolmen is constructed entirely of granite and consists of three upright stones supporting a large capstone. The two portal stones at the southern end measure approximately 6 ft. 9 in. and 6 ft. in height, while the single rear support stone at the northern end is about 4 ft. high. The capstone itself is coffin-shaped, nearly 2 ft. thick, and spans the uprights. A slab beneath the capstone may be a structural feature or part of a cairn base, as traces of a cairn can be found around the monument. Legananny Dolmen is under state care and is considered one of the most remarkable megalithic structures in County Down.

In The Ancient and Present State of the County of Down (1757), Walter Harris describes the monument as “a cromlech [that] stands in the townland of Leganeny and parish of Drumgoolan, on a mountain called Slieve-na-boil-trough (meaning Slievenaboley), being a part of Slieve Croob, near a small lake lying in the valley underneath it.” He further characterizes it as “a huge gritty rock, in the shape of a monstrous coffin, supported by three feet.” Although the lake mentioned by Harris has since dried up, local folklore recounts a tale of a man who captured a supernatural horse from the lake and attempted to use it for ploughing. The horse, however, returned to the lake after completing a single furrow.

Slievegarran, at 391 metres, is the highest hill in the Legananny area of the Dromara Hills. It is accessed via open farmland and provides views of the Mourne Mountains, Lough Neagh, and the Irish Sea.

== Geography ==
Townlands that border Legananny include:

- Backaderry to the east
- Benraw to the west
- Dree to the north
- Finnis to the west
- Leitrim to the south
- Slievenaboley to the west

== Gallery ==
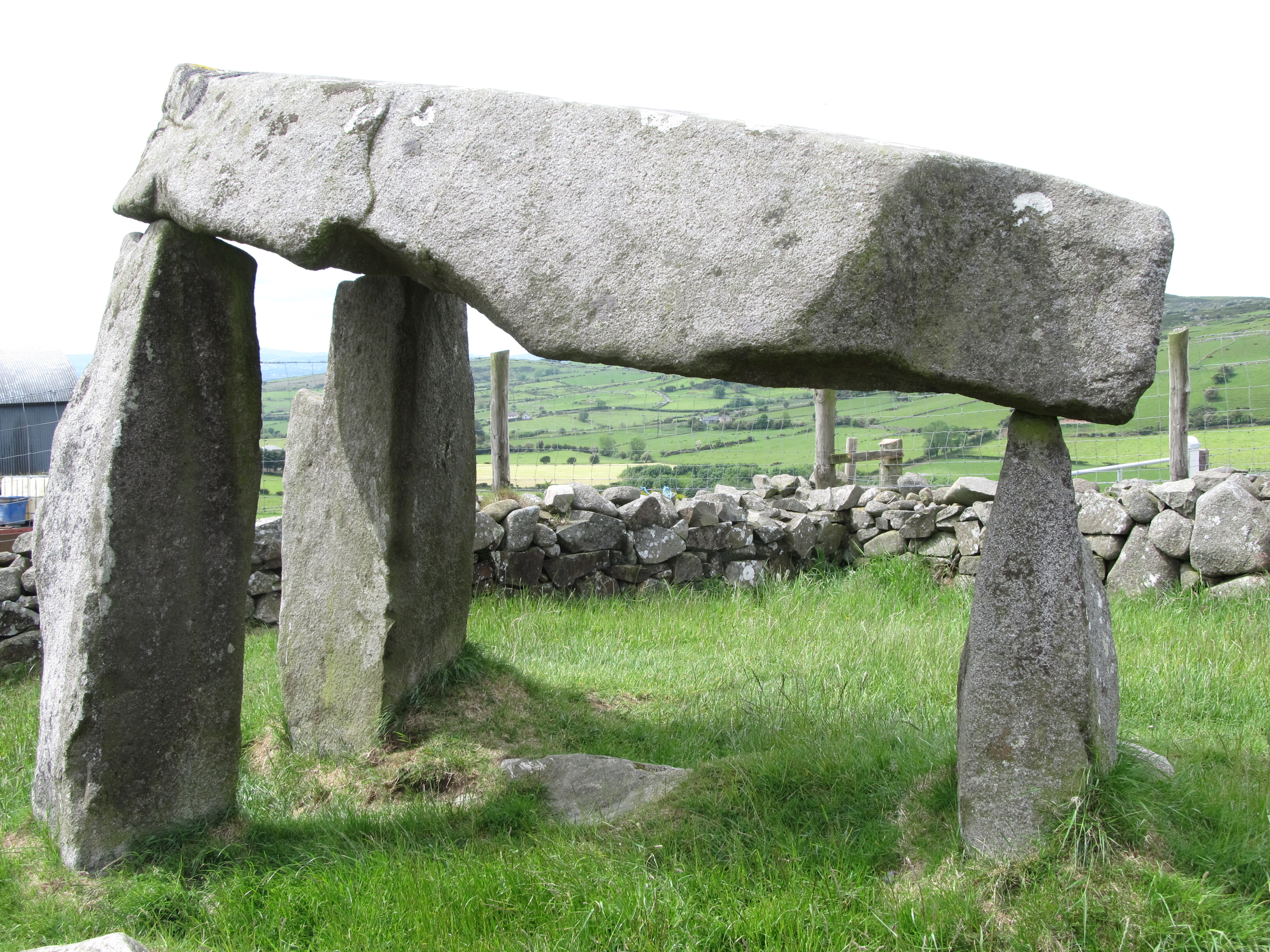
The Legananny Dolmen viewed from the East

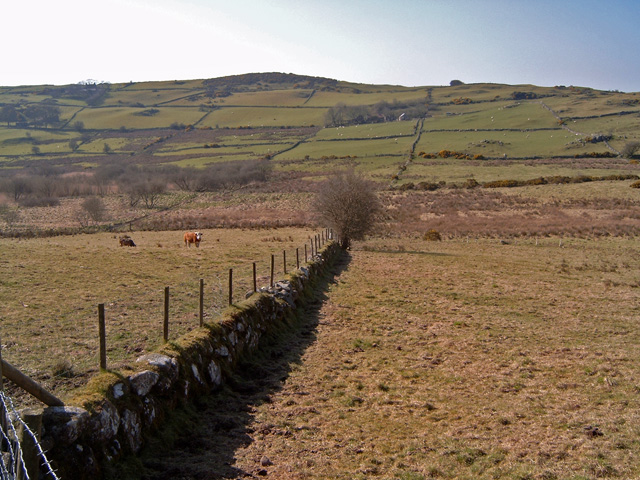
Valley between Cratlieve and Slievenaboley

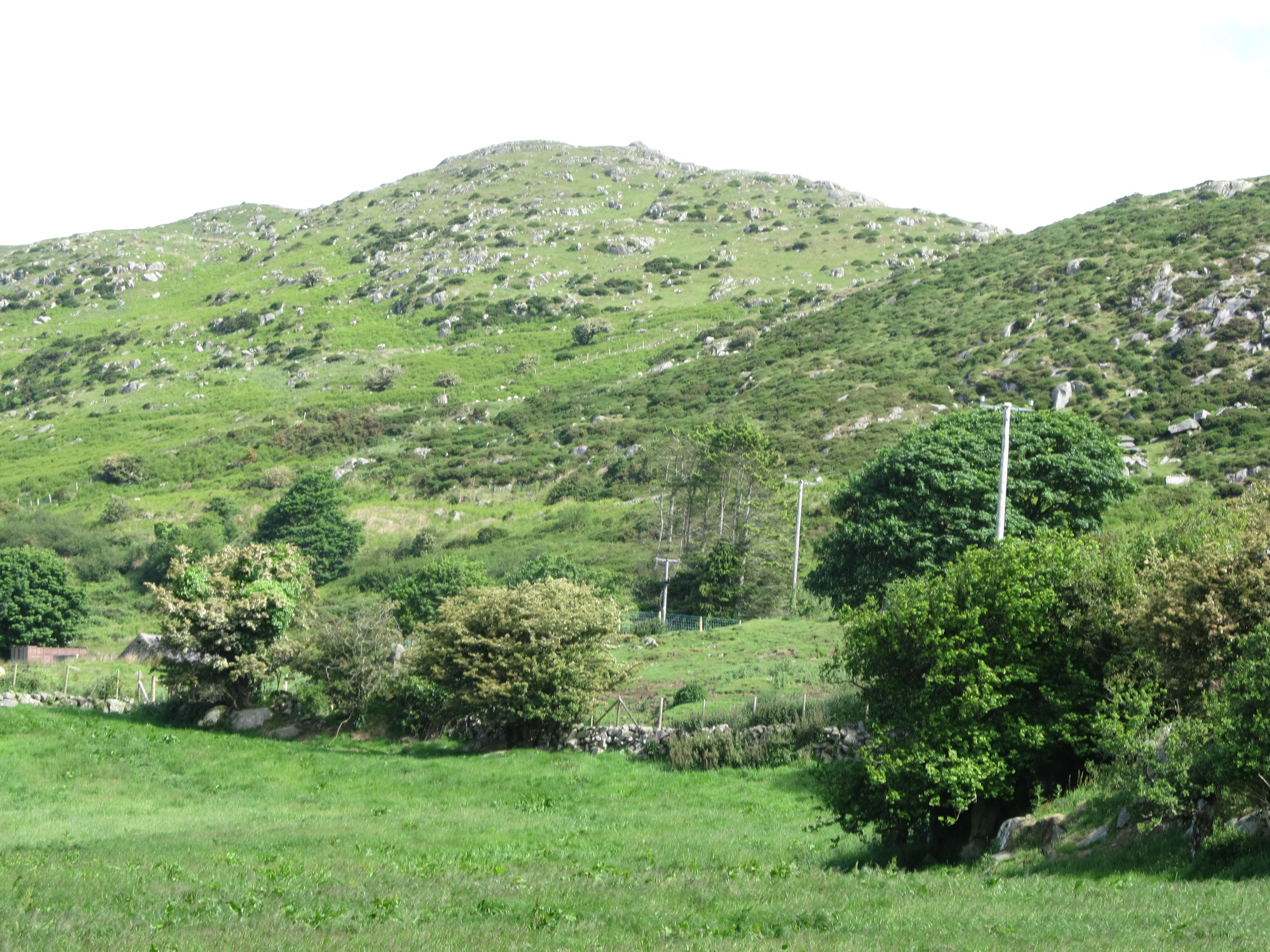
The summit of Slievegarran from the Ribadoo Road
