= Katesbridge =

Coordinates: 54.3033°N 6.14098°W

Katesbridge: Irish: Droichead Cháit
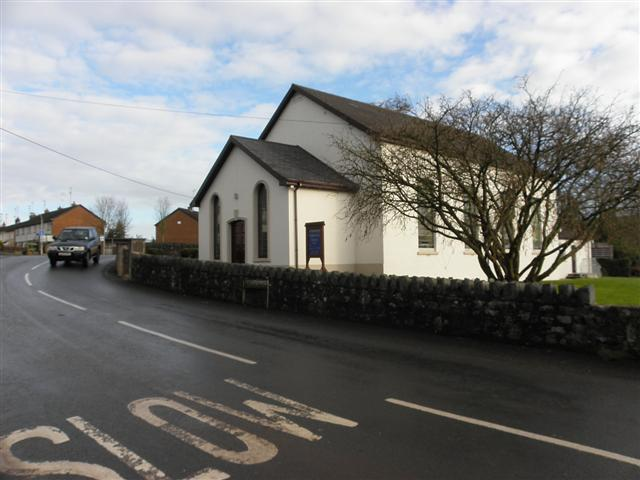
- Katesbridge Presbyterian Church

- Location within County Down
- Population: 150 (2011 Census)
- County: County Down
- Country: Northern Ireland
- Sovereign state: United Kingdom
- Post town: Banbridge
- Postcode district: BT32
- Dialling code: 028
- Police: Northern Ireland
- Fire: Northern Ireland
- Ambulance: Northern Ireland
- UK Parliament: South Down

Katesbridge is a small hamlet in County Down, Northern Ireland. It is within the townland of Shannaghan, just off the main route from Castlewellan to Banbridge, and 4.3 miles (7 km) north of Rathfriland. The River Bann flows by the hamlet. In the 2001 Census it had a population of 135 people. It lies within the Banbridge District.

The hamlet is named after Kate McKay, who was born in Ballyroney in 1691 and later went to live with her grandmother who is said to have owned the house where the workmen lodged when building the 18th-century bridge. It is because of Kate's kindness the workmen named the bridge after her, and the hamlet became known as Katesbridge.

The novelist Thomas Mayne Reid was born in Ballyroney in 1818.

== Transport ==
Katesbridge railway station, on the Great Northern Railway, was opened on 14 December 1880 and finally closed on 2 May 1955.

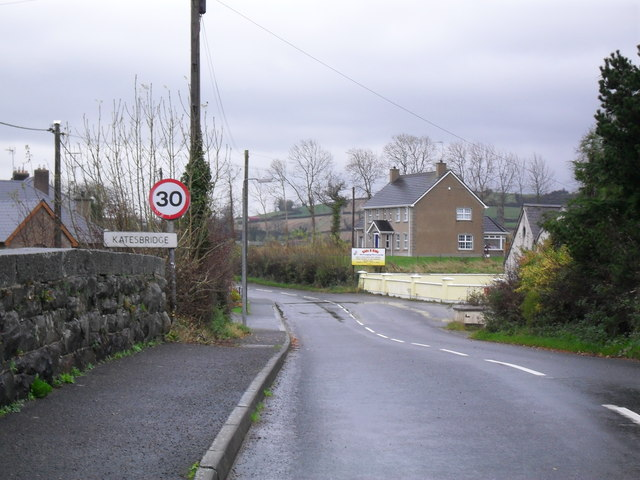
Crossing over the GNR bridge into Katesbridge.

== Climate ==
Katesbridge is often noted in weather reports as the coldest location on the island of Ireland as well as within the United Kingdom. This is due to its status as a 'frost hollow', a low-lying location relative to its surroundings which allows the colder air to settle. Frosts can occur at any time of year.

The highest temperature recorded in Katesbridge was 30.0 °C (86.0 °F) on 28 June 2018, and the lowest temperature recorded was −17.8 °C (0.0 °F) on 21 December 2010.

Climate data for Katesbridge (1991–2020 normals)
Month	Jan	Feb	Mar	Apr	May	Jun	Jul	Aug	Sep	Oct	Nov	Dec	Year
Record high °C (°F)	14.5 (58.1)	16.1 (61.0)	18.9 (66.0)	22.4 (72.3)	24.8 (76.6)	30.0 (86.0)	29.4 (84.9)	28.5 (83.3)	26.7 (80.1)	20.7 (69.3)	17.5 (63.5)	14.7 (58.5)	30.0 (86.0)
Mean daily maximum °C (°F)	7.6 (45.7)	8.2 (46.8)	9.9 (49.8)	12.3 (54.1)	15.2 (59.4)	17.6 (63.7)	19.1 (66.4)	18.8 (65.8)	16.7 (62.1)	13.4 (56.1)	10.2 (50.4)	7.9 (46.2)	13.1 (55.6)
Daily mean °C (°F)	4.3 (39.7)	4.6 (40.3)	5.8 (42.4)	7.7 (45.9)	10.3 (50.5)	12.8 (55.0)	14.5 (58.1)	14.2 (57.6)	12.4 (54.3)	9.5 (49.1)	6.5 (43.7)	4.5 (40.1)	8.9 (48.0)
Mean daily minimum °C (°F)	1.0 (33.8)	0.9 (33.6)	1.7 (35.1)	3.1 (37.6)	5.3 (41.5)	8.0 (46.4)	10.0 (50.0)	9.6 (49.3)	8.0 (46.4)	5.5 (41.9)	2.9 (37.2)	1.1 (34.0)	4.8 (40.6)
Record low °C (°F)	−12.1 (10.2)	−9.8 (14.4)	−14.8 (5.4)	−8.0 (17.6)	−6.1 (21.0)	−1.9 (28.6)	−0.6 (30.9)	−1.9 (28.6)	−3.7 (25.3)	−6.4 (20.5)	−9.0 (15.8)	−17.8 (0.0)	−17.8 (0.0)
Average precipitation mm (inches)	82.2 (3.24)	66.2 (2.61)	66.2 (2.61)	60.6 (2.39)	59.3 (2.33)	69.3 (2.73)	75.7 (2.98)	84.4 (3.32)	71.1 (2.80)	92.4 (3.64)	99.8 (3.93)	83.1 (3.27)	910.2 (35.83)
Average precipitation days (≥ 1.0 mm)	14.7	13.1	12.7	11.6	11.5	12.0	13.0	13.8	12.5	14.0	15.3	14.5	158.8
Source 1: Met Office
Source 2: Starlings Roost Weather

== See also ==
- List of towns and villages in Northern Ireland
