= Katesbridge railway station =

Railway station in County Down, Northern Ireland

Katesbridge
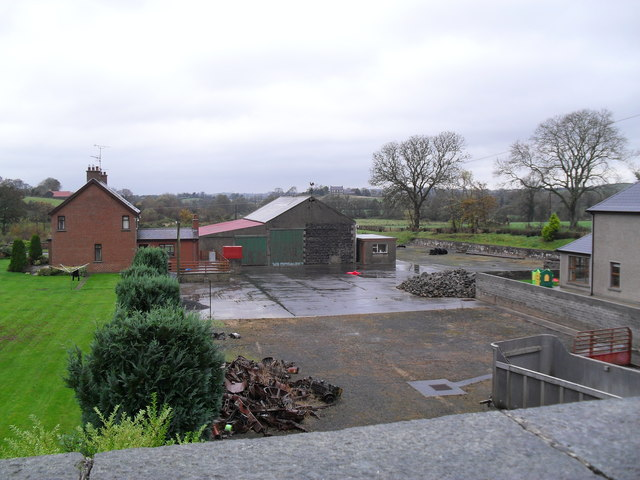
- Katesbridge Station opened in 1880. The trackbed ran between the goods shed (now a barn) and the red brick house (this is a later dwelling) - the hedge marks it out quite well. The view is towards Banbridge. Photograph 29 October 2009

General information
- Location: County Down; Northern Ireland
- Coordinates: 54.298666°N 6.147596°W

Other information
- Status: Disused

History
- Original company: Great Northern Railway (Ireland)
- Pre-grouping: Great Northern Railway (Ireland)
- Post-grouping: Great Northern Railway (Ireland)

Key dates
- 14 December 1880: Station opens
- 2 May 1955: Station closes
Location
- Location within Northern Ireland

Katesbridge railway station was a railway station serving the small hamlet of Katesbridge in County Down, Northern Ireland. It was located on the Great Northern Railway (Ireland) which ran from Banbridge to Castlewellan.

== History ==
The station was opened on 14 December 1880.

The station closed on 2 May 1955 under the auspices of the Great Northern Railway Board. The station served Katesbridge providing direct connections.

| Preceding station | Historical railways | Following station |
|---|---|---|
| Poland's Bridge | Great Northern Railway (Ireland); Banbridge-Castlewellan | Ballyroney |
