= Drumadonald railway station =

Railway station in County Down, Northern Ireland

Drumadonald

General information
- Location: County Down; Northern Ireland
- Coordinates: 54.2788°N 6.0774°W

Other information
- Status: Disused

History
- Original company: Great Northern Railway (Ireland)
- Pre-grouping: Great Northern Railway (Ireland)
- Post-grouping: Great Northern Railway (Ireland)

Key dates
- 2 October 1932: Station opens
- 2 May 1955: Station closes
Location
- Location within Northern Ireland Location within the United Kingdom

Drumadonald railway station was on the Great Northern Railway (Ireland) which ran from Banbridge to Castlewellan in Northern Ireland.

== History ==
The station was opened on 2 October 1932.

The station closed on 2 May 1955.

Preceding station	Historical railways	Following station
Ballyroney	Great Northern Railway (Ireland); Banbridge-Castlewellan	Ballyward
