= Leitrim railway station =

Station in County Down, Northern Ireland

Leitrim
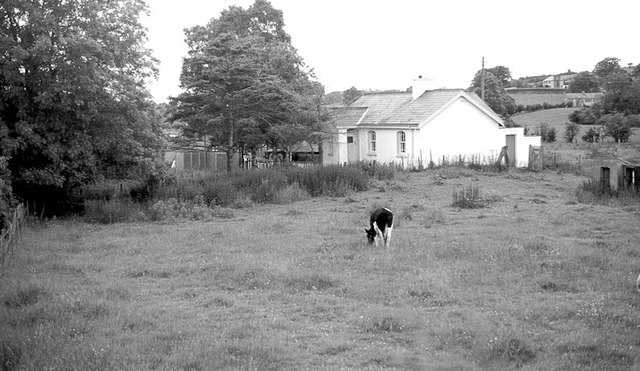
- The Leitrim Railway house before demolition, in July 1980.

General information
- Location: Leitrim, County Down; Northern Ireland

Other information
- Status: Disused

History
- Opened: 24 March 1906
- Closed: 2 May 1955
- Original company: Great Northern Railway (Ireland)
Location

Leitrim railway station was on the Great Northern Railway (Ireland) which ran from Banbridge to Castlewellan in Northern Ireland, this station was situated in the village of Leitrim.

The Leitrim railway station opened in early 1906 and was regularly used.

The station was closed in early 1955 and left in disrepair. The station was eventually demolished entirely.

An estate in Leitrim was named "Old Railway Close" in reference to the railway line that used to run through the village.

== Train line ==
Preceding station	Historical railways	Following station
Ballyward	Great Northern Railway (Ireland); Banbridge-Castlewellan	Castlewellan
