= Ballyward railway station =

Railway station in County Down, Northern Ireland

Coordinates: 54.2790°N 6.0384°W

Ballyward
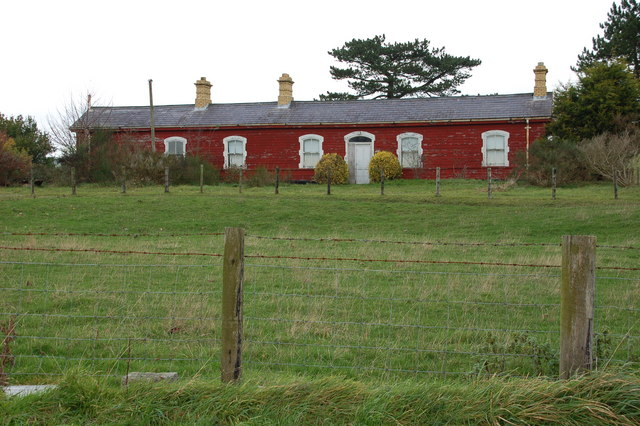
- Ballyward station has achieved a certain celebrity status because it is still, more or less, intact. This is the station building. The platforms and track were on the other side. Photograph 18 November 2006

General information
- Location: County Down; Northern Ireland

Other information
- Status: Disused

History
- Original company: Great Northern Railway (Ireland)
- Pre-grouping: Great Northern Railway (Ireland)
- Post-grouping: Great Northern Railway (Ireland)

Key dates
- 24 March 1906: Station opens
- 2 May 1955: Station closes
Location
- Location within Northern Ireland Location within the United Kingdom

Ballyward railway station was a railway station serving Ballyward, County Down, Northern Ireland, on the Great Northern Railway (Ireland) which ran from Banbridge to Castlewellan.

== History ==
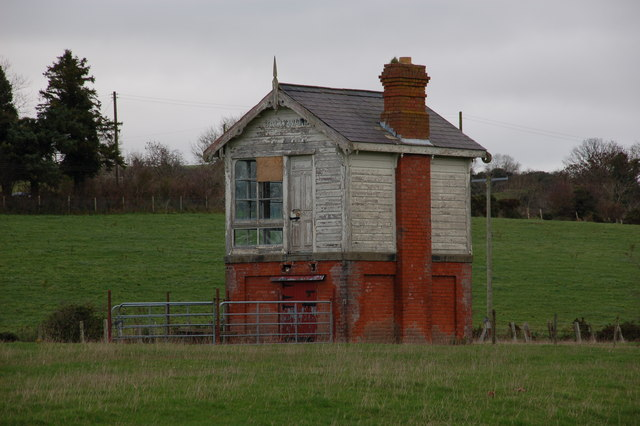
Remains of the signal box

The station was opened on 24 March 1906.

The station closed on 2 May 1955.

Preceding station	Historical railways	Following station
Drumadonald	Great Northern Railway (Ireland); Banbridge-Castlewellan	Leitrim
