= Corbet railway station =

Railway station in Northern Ireland

Coordinates: 54.3363°N 6.2091°W

Corbet
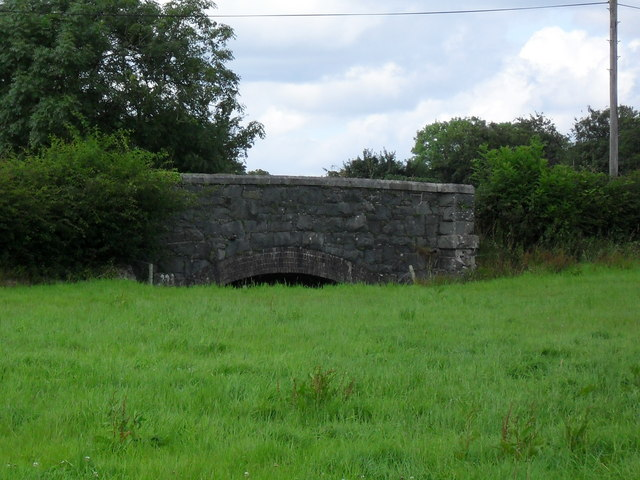
- It was here that the Corbet station stood. The trackbed and station have long since disappeared under this field. Photograph taken 20 July 2009.

General information
- Location: County Down; Northern Ireland

Other information
- Status: Disused

History
- Original company: Great Northern Railway
- Pre-grouping: Great Northern Railway
- Post-grouping: Great Northern Railway

Key dates
- 1 March 1880: Station opens
- 2 May 1955: Station closes
Location
- Location within County Down Location within Northern Ireland

Corbet railway station was a railway station in the city of Corbet on the Great Northern Railway which ran from Banbridge to Castlewellan in Northern Ireland.

== History ==
The station was opened on 1 March 1880 and closed on 2 May 1955.

Preceding station	Historical railways	Following station
Banbridge	Great Northern Railway (Ireland); Banbridge-Castlewellan	Poland's Bridge
