= Ballyroney railway station =

Railway station in County Down, Northern Ireland

Coordinates: 54.2733°N 6.1241°W

Ballyroney
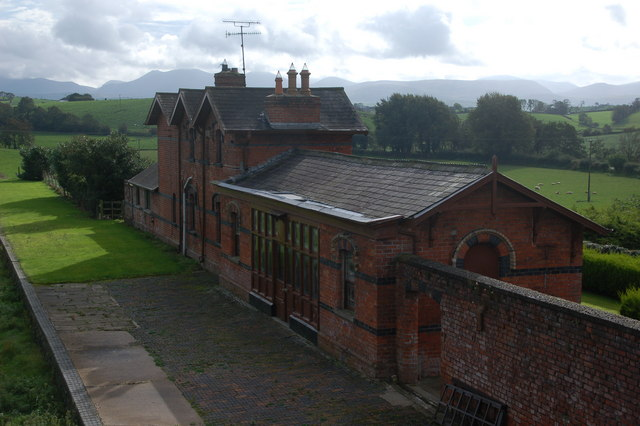
- Ballyroney was one of the principal loading points for cattle bound for the ports of NW England. The station is a private house and part of the platform is now a lawn. Otherwise it remains more or less in its original condition. This is the view towards Castlewellan. Photograph 11 October 2006.

General information
- Location: County Down; Northern Ireland

Other information
- Status: Disused

History
- Original company: Great Northern Railway (Ireland)
- Pre-grouping: Great Northern Railway (Ireland)
- Post-grouping: Great Northern Railway (Ireland)

Key dates
- 14 December 1880: Station opens
- 2 May 1955: Station closes
Location
- Location within Northern Ireland Location within the United Kingdom

Ballyroney railway station was on the Great Northern Railway (Ireland) which ran from Banbridge to Castlewellan in Northern Ireland.

== History ==
The station was opened on 14 December 1880.

The station closed on 2 May 1955.

Preceding station	Historical railways	Following station
Katesbridge	Great Northern Railway (Ireland); Banbridge-Castlewellan	Drumadonald
