= Rathfriland Castle =

Ruin in County Down, Northern Ireland

Coordinates: 54.2386°N 6.1584°W

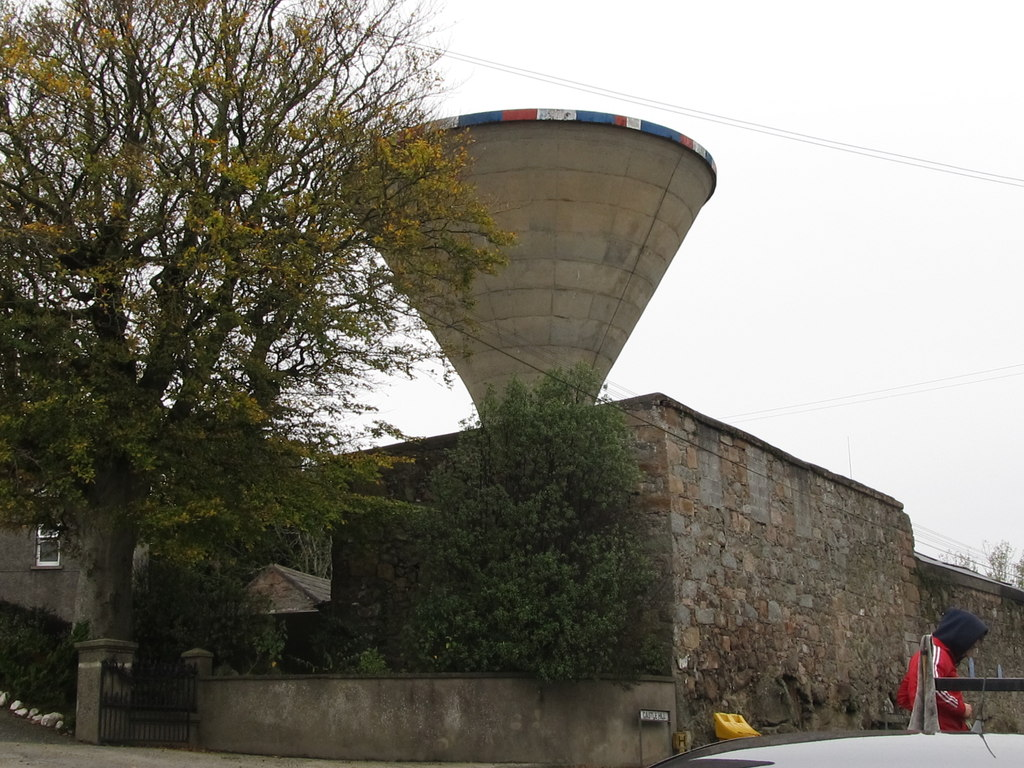
Remains of the castle

Rathfriland Castle (Irish: Caislean Ráth Fraoileann) is a ruined castle in Rathfriland, County Down, Northern Ireland. The castle was a square building of 3–4 storeys with a stone barrel vault at the first floor level to reduce the risk of fire and was one of the seats of the Magennis's, Lords of Iveagh. Most of it was pulled down by Mr. William Hawkins of London, after the rebellion of 1641, and the remainder destroyed by General Henry Ireton on Oliver Cromwell's orders.

The castle was mainly built from greywacke and granite. Only the southern wall remains.
