= Legananny Dolmen =

Dolmen in Northern Ireland

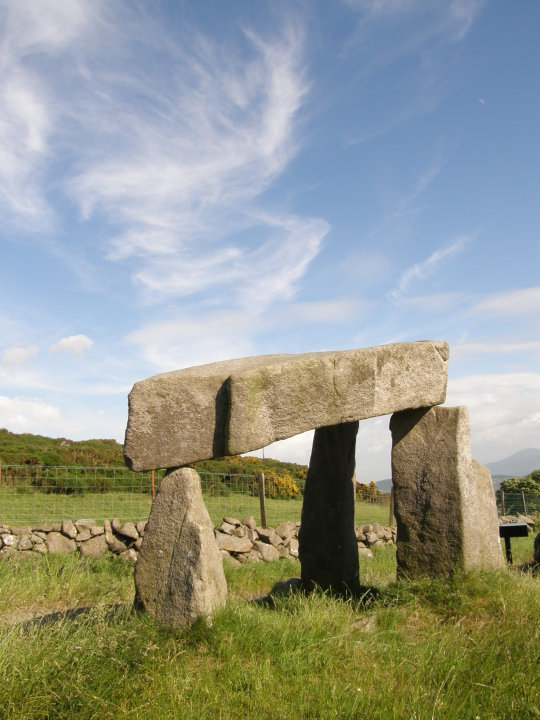
- The dolmen in 2010
- Interactive map of Legananny Dolmen
- 54.323°N 6.020°W
- Type: Dolmen
- Location: County Down, Northern Ireland

History
- Built: c. 3000 BC

Site notes
- Material: Stone

The Legananny Dolmen is a megalithic dolmen or cromlech nine miles southeast of Banbridge and three miles north of Castlewellan, both in County Down, Northern Ireland. It is on the slopes of Slieve Croob near the village of Leitrim in Drumgooland parish, between a farmer's stone wall and a back road. It is a State Care Historic Monument sited in the townland of Legananny, in Banbridge District, at grid ref: J2887 4339.

This tripod dolmen has a capstone over 3 m (10 ft) long and 1.8 m (6 ft) from the ground. It dates to the Neolithic period, making the monument around 5,000 years old. Such portal tombs were funerary sites for the disposal of the dead in Neolithic society. The heavy stones would have been dragged some distance before being set in place. The three supporting stones are unusually long and there are slight traces of a cairn which must have been far more extensive. Some urns were found underneath.

The name Legananny is derived from Irish Liagán Áine 'Áine's standing stone'.

== Gallery ==
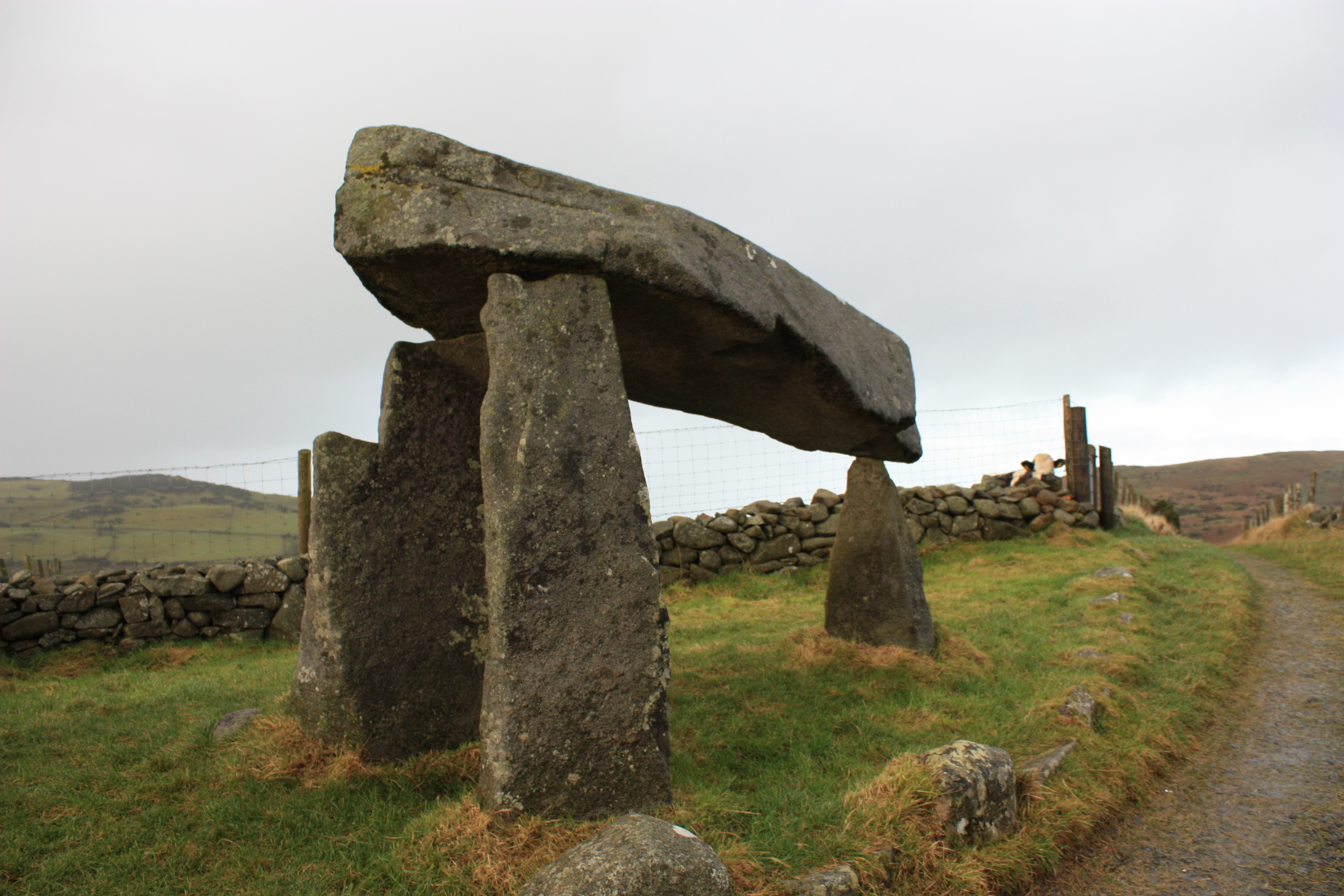

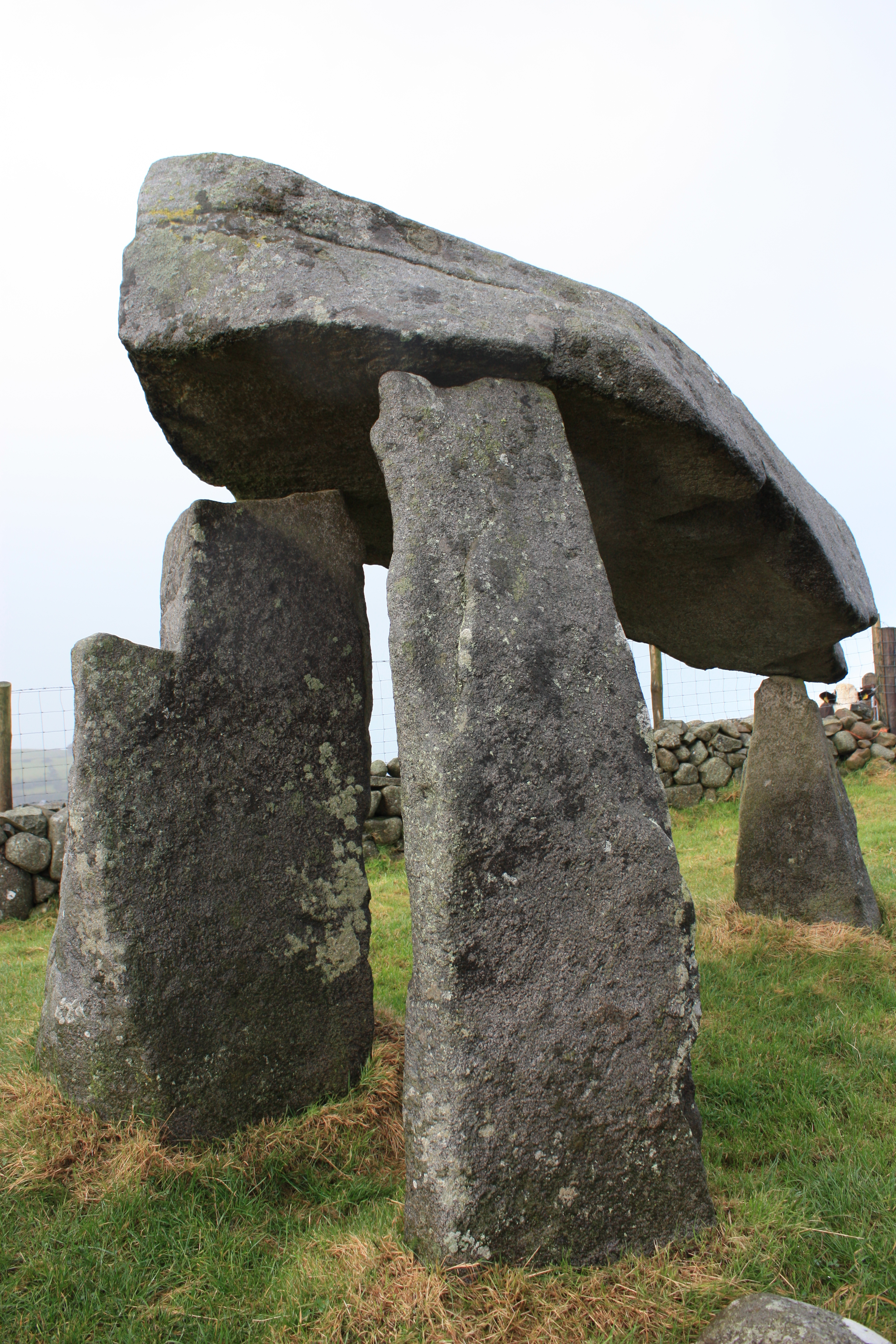

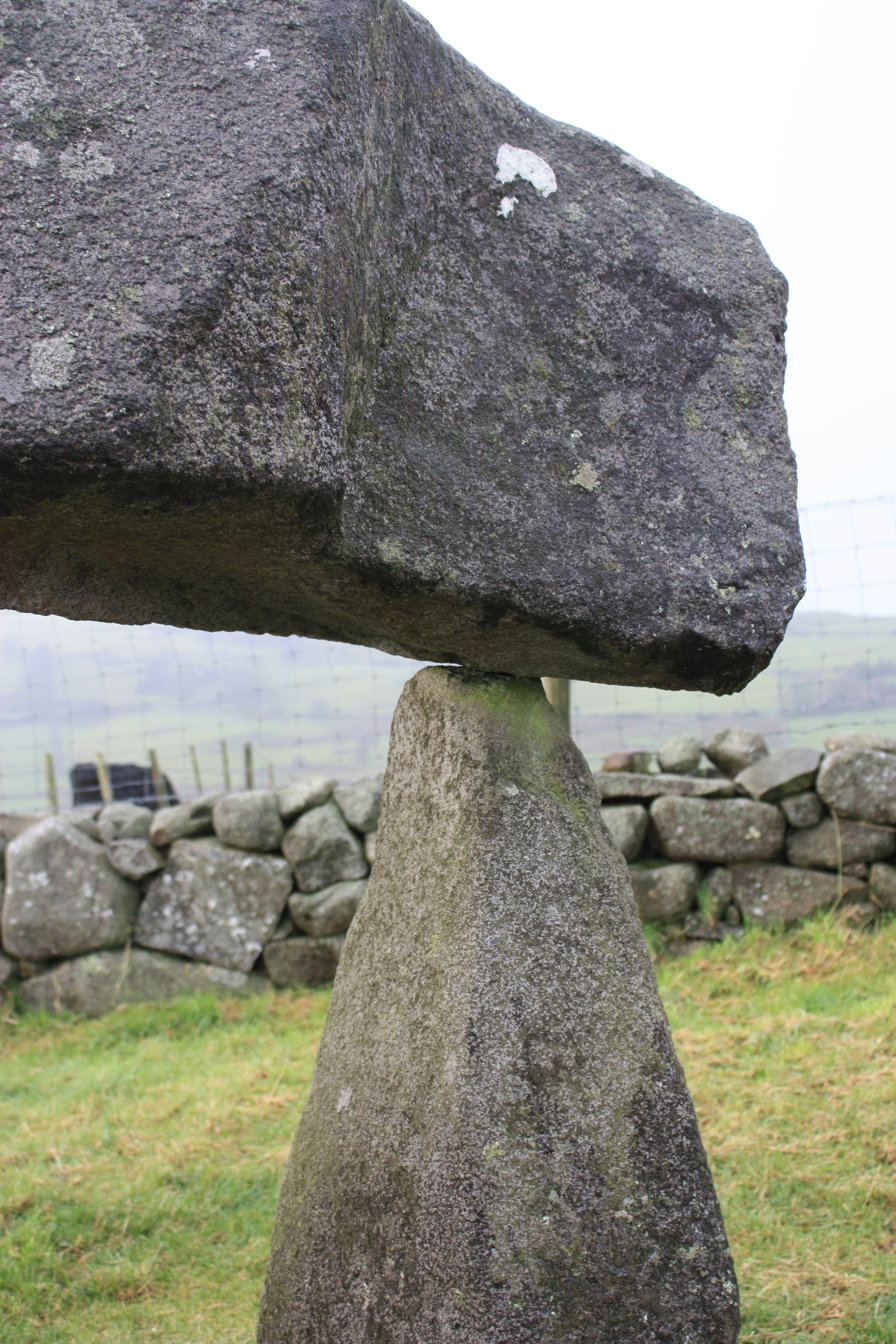

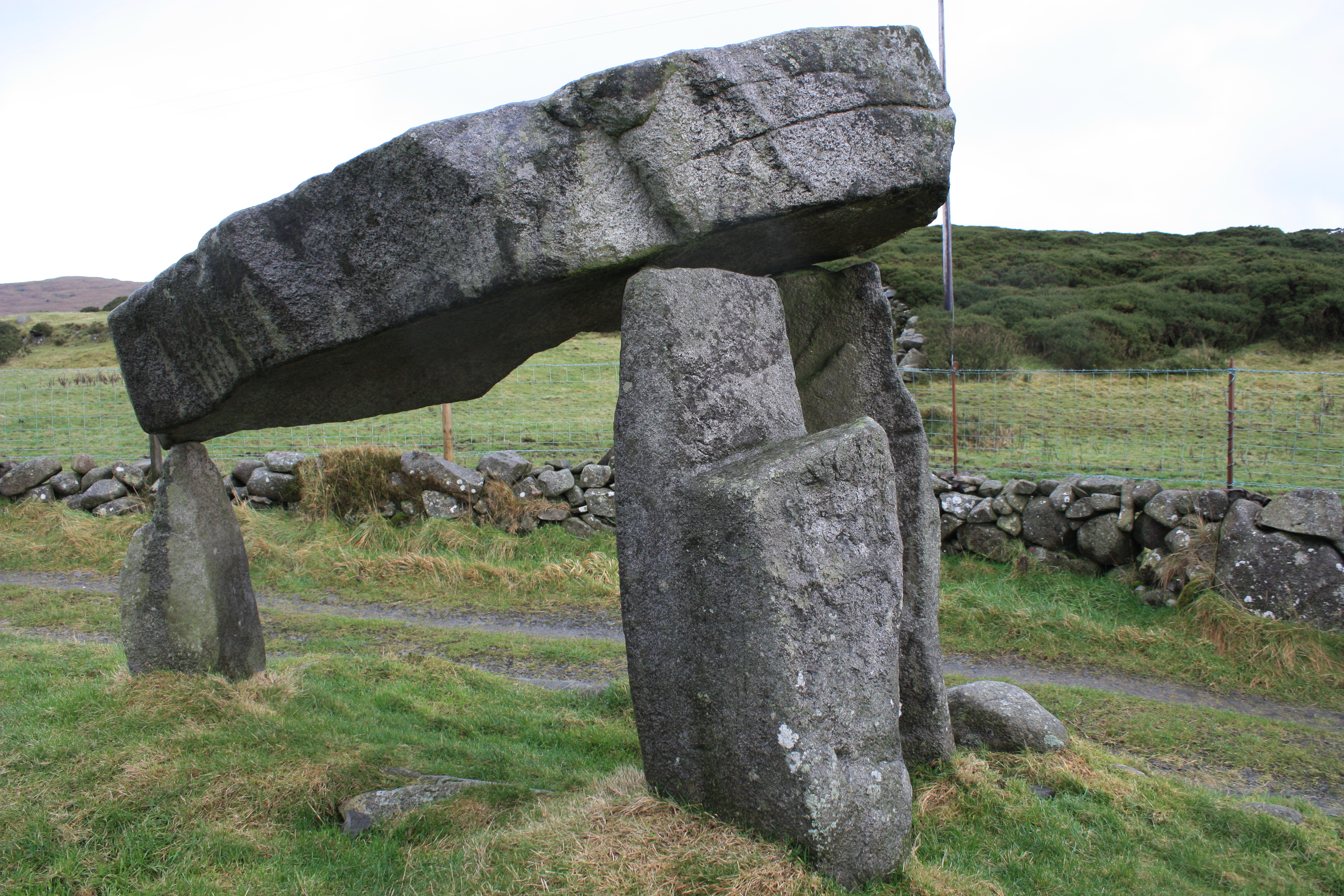

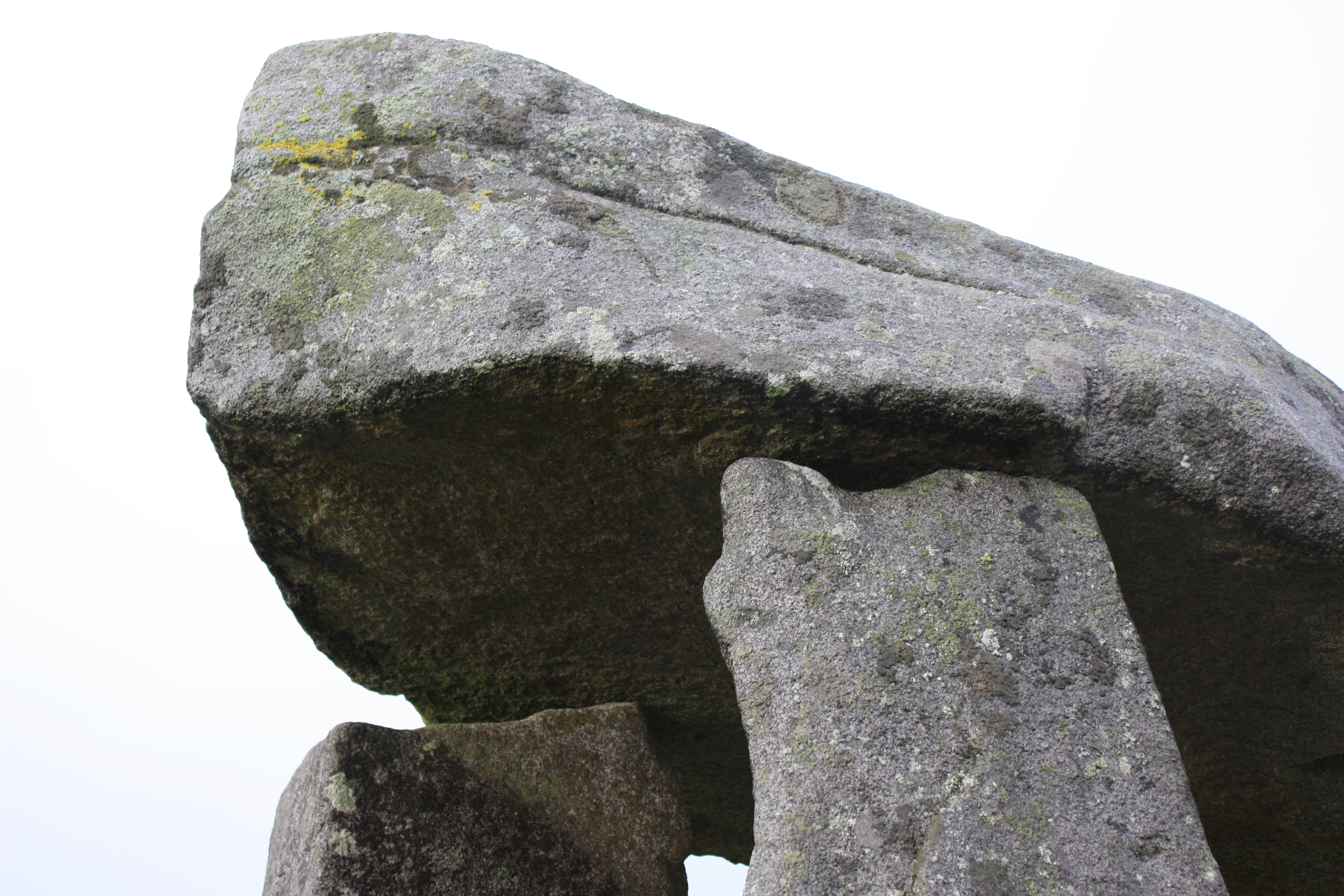
