= Drumgooland =

Civil parish in County Down, Northern Ireland

Drumgooland is a civil parish in County Down, Northern Ireland. It is situated mainly in the historic barony of Iveagh Upper, Lower Half, with one townland in the barony of Iveagh Lower, Lower Half.

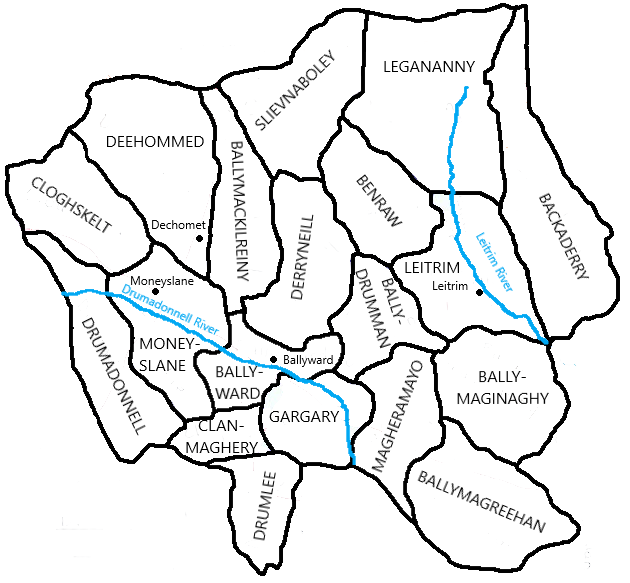
Map of the Drumgooland Parish

== Settlements ==
The civil parish contains the following settlements:

- Ballyward
- Dechomet
- Leitrim
- Moneyslane

== Townlands ==
Drumgooland civil parish contains the following townlands:

- Backaderry
- Ballydrumman
- Ballymackilreiny
- Ballymaginaghy
- Ballymagreehan
- Ballyward
- Benraw
- Clanmaghery
- Cloghskelt
- Deehommed (Dechomet)
- Derryneill
- Drumadonnell
- Drumlee
- Gargarry
- Legananny
- Leitrim
- Magheramayo
- Moneyslane
- Slievenaboley

=== Subtownlands ===
Drumgooland civil parish contains the following subtownlands, all of which are contained within the townland of Magheramayo:

- Dolly's Brae
- Drumbuggan
- Magheramayo Upper
- Rathmore

== See also ==
- List of civil parishes of County Down
