= Agnes Macready =

Australian nurse and journalist (1855–1935)

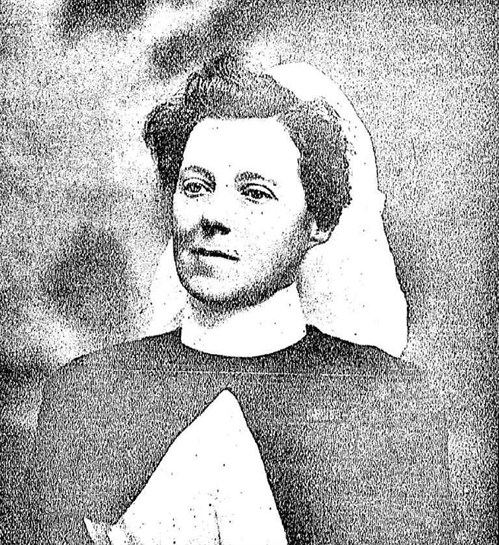
- Born: 1855; Rathfriland
- Occupation: Journalist, nurse

Agnes Macready (1855–1935) was an Australian nurse and journalist. Often writing as Arrah Luen, she is considered Australia's first female war correspondent.

== Life ==
Macready was born in 1855 in Rathfriland, Ireland, the eldest of five children of Jane and Henry Macready. The family emigrated to New South Wales when she was 12 years old. When she was 25 she began nursing training at Royal Prince Alfred Hospital in Sydney, followed by further training in Melbourne to become a surgical nurse.

In 1898 Macready began writing articles and poems, and creating drawings, for the Sydney newspaper The Catholic Press under the pen name Arrah Luen. Some of this work was reprinted in American and Irish newspapers.

Agnes was appointed as Matron at the Berrima District Cottage Hospital in the Southern Highland of New South Wales on 11 October 1894. She resigned from this post in December 1898.

On 24 October 1899, just two weeks after war was declared in South Africa, Macready bought her own steamship ticket and departed Sydney for Durban, keen to assist with nursing soldiers wounded in the Boer War. She arrived before the first contingent of Australian troops, and initially the British War Office told her that no nurses were needed in the country and advised to leave. However, she was also advised to apply to rural locations, which she did, and was offered a position at Fort Napier Military Hospital in Pietermaritzburg. She carried on to nurse in Ladysmith during and after the town's siege, Wyburg and Pretoria, and in a camp for Boer prisoners at Simon's Town.

Prior to leaving Sydney, The Catholic Press had commissioned Macready as a special correspondent, and she filed reports for the newspaper from South Africa on her experiences there. Her writing was often critical of the British and sympathetic to the Boers.

In September 1901 Macready returned to Sydney on a hospital ship, overseeing the nursing of wounded soldiers from Dawes Point, Sydney. She became matron of Wyalong Hospital, moving to Kurri Kurri Hospital in 1904. She continued to write for The Catholic Press.
