= Derryneill =

Coordinates: 54.285°N 6.037°W

Derryneill: Irish: Doire Néill
- Location within County Down
- County: County Down
- Country: Northern Ireland
- Sovereign state: United Kingdom
- Postcode district: BT31
- Dialling code: 028

Derryneill (from Irish Doire Néill, meaning 'Niall's oak-wood') is a townland of 1,049 acres in County Down, Northern Ireland, near to Leitrim, County Down. It is situated in the civil parish of Drumgooland and the historic barony of Iveagh Upper, Lower Half. Derryneill is mainly made up of small rocky drumlins.

== History ==
In 1609 Derryneill was part of the holding of Ballyward held by Shane McEvard.

== See also ==
- List of townlands in County Down
