= Moneyslane =

Village in County Down, Northern Ireland

Coordinates: 54.288°N 6.088°W

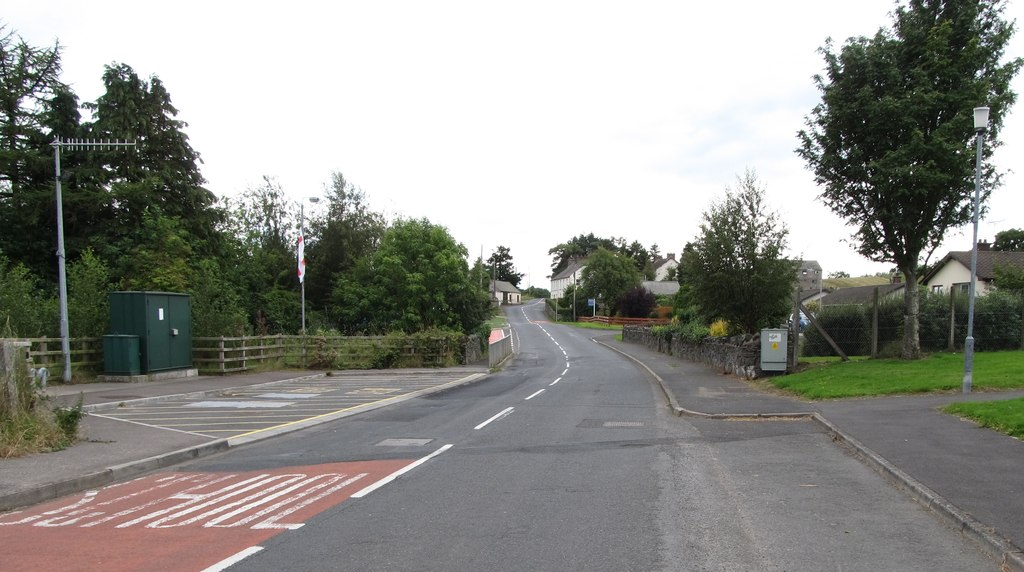
A view of Dromara Road, Moneyslane

Moneyslane (from Irish: Muine Sleanna) is a small village and townland in County Down, Northern Ireland, on the main route from Castlewellan to Banbridge. In the 2001 Census, Moneyslane had a population of 147.

== History ==
In the 1659 Census this townland was called Nunis Lane and there were 16 families living there. By 1841 there were 138 families with 356 males and 356 females, 10% of whom were receiving Famine relief. A corn mill was built in 1831, held by James McBride from General Meade. Water supplied by a small stream was not in sufficient quantity, so that the mill worked only five months on average. The water wheel was 18 feet in diameter, breadth 3 feet, diameter of the cog wheel was 8 feet; it was double geared with wood and metal machinery. The flax mill was next to the corn mill and worked by the same water wheel. It was the property of James McBride. It was first built in 1800 and completely repaired in 1834, but only worked four months of the year. The diameter of the cog wheel was 8 feet. It was double geared with metal machinery.

== Football ==
Moneyslane Football Club plays in Intermediate 'A' in the Mid-Ulster League. Home games are played at, Jubilee Park in Moneyslane. They have two senior teams along with a junior section and form part of the Mid-Ulster Football Association.

== Moneyslane Free Presbyterian Church ==
Moneyslane Free Presbyterian Church commenced on the first Sunday of October 1966. It met first in Moneyslane Orange Hall, before a new Church building was erected nearby. The site for the new Church was given by the McElroy family. The first minister of the congregation was Rev John Douglas. On his removal to Lisburn Free Presbyterian Church he was succeeded by Rev Michael Patrick, who later took up ministry in Australia. Rev Ron Johnstone ministered in Moneyslane until his removal to Armagh. Rev William McDermott was installed as minister in September 1998. Rev Daniel Henderson was ordained and installed as minister in 2018.

== Links ==
- Archaeological excavations at Drumadonnell, Moneyslane (archived 2001)
- Moneyslane village
