= Rathfriland =

Village in County Down, Northern Ireland

Coordinates: 54.238°N 6.161°W

Rathfriland: Irish: Ráth Fraoileann
- Village
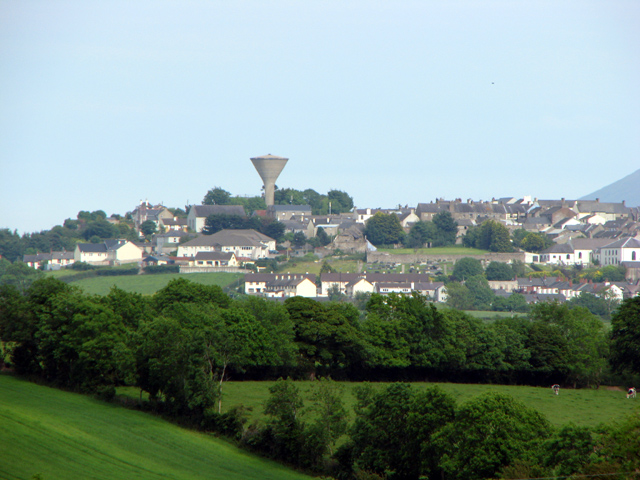

- Location within County Down
- Population: 2,490 (2021 census)
- District: Armagh, Banbridge and Craigavon
- County: County Down
- Country: Northern Ireland
- Sovereign state: United Kingdom
- Post town: NEWRY
- Postcode district: BT34
- Dialling code: 028
- UK Parliament: South Down
- NI Assembly: South Down

Rathfriland (from Irish Ráth Fraoileann, meaning 'ringfort of Fraoile') is a market village in County Down, Northern Ireland. It is 8 miles (13 km) north-east of Newry and 27 miles (43 km) south of Belfast. It had a population of 2,490 in the 2021 census.

== History ==
In older documents written in English, the village's name was usually spelt Rathfylan or Rathfrilan. It was once the capital of the Magennis family, the Gaelic lords of Iveagh. They built a castle there in the late 16th century. The ruins (south gable 30 by 25 feet (9.1 m × 7.6 m)) may still be seen on the hill upon which Rathfriland sits. It was a square building of 3-4 storeys with a stone barrel vault on the ground floor to lessen the risk of fire. The castle was battered down during the Irish Confederate Wars and much of the remainder was carried off by William Hawkins of London, the first Protestant landowner there after the war. The stones were used to build the Town Inn (the building of which still stands on the corner of The Square and Newry Street) and other houses in the village. In 1760 the Market House, which dominates the main square, was built for the linen market by Miss Theodosia McGill. An old map of 1776 prepared for the Meade Estate shows streets, lanes, tenements and gardens forming the early village.

A clock-faced war memorial stands in the square on the southeastern side. To this day, the names Meade, Maginess and Hawkins live on in Rathfriland, most notably in Iveagh Primary School where the three surnames are the name of the 'sporting houses' or teams and are used on sports day.

Rathfriland lies in County Down, the baronies of Iveagh Lower, Lower Half and Iveagh Upper, Upper Half, the townlands of Rossconor and Lessize, the district electoral area of Knockiveagh, and the civil parishes of Drumballyroney and Drumgath.

== Education ==
Primary schools in the area include Iveagh Primary School (a coeducational primary school that educates around 350 pupils aged from 3 to 11) and St Mary's Primary School.

Rathfriland High School is a local secondary school.

== Transport ==
Rathfriland was served by Ballyroney railway station, only a few miles away. Goods and passengers were transported from the station to the village. The former GNR (I) line between Banbridge and Newcastle was shut down in 1955 by the UTA.

Translink now operates daily services between Rathfriland and Banbridge, Newry and Newcastle.

== Sport ==
Rathfriland Rangers F.C. play association football in the NIFL Championship.

Other sporting clubs include:

- Rathfriland F.C. - formed in 1962.
- Rathfriland Bowling Club - level green bowls.
- Rathfriland Junior F.C. - formed in 2002.
- Drumgath GAC - Gaelic games.
- Rathfriland Angling Club - game fishing On the Upper River Bann and Drumlough Lake.

== Demography ==
Rathfriland is classified as a village by the Northern Ireland Statistics and Research Agency (NISRA). At the 2021 census there were 2,490 people living in Rathfriland. Of these:

- 40% were from a Catholic background;
- 29% were from a Presbyterian background;
- 8% were from a Church of Ireland background;
- Less than 1% were Methodist;
- other Christian religions made up 9%;
- other religions made up 1%;
- 13% indicated no religion or was not stated

== Media ==
Rathfriland has had its own newspaper (The Outlook) since 1940.

== Twin town ==
Rathfriand is twinned with the Canadian city of Armstrong is North Okanagan, British Columbia.

== Notable people ==
Notable people with local connections include:

- Agnes Macready Australia's first war correspondent was born here in 1855.
- Theodosia Meade, Countess of Clanwilliam.
- Patrick Brontë, the father of the Brontë sisters (Charlotte, Emily and Anne) was born in 1777 in a cottage in Edenagarry on the outskirts of Annaclone, where he lived until a local vicar paid his way to Cambridge University in 1802. He preached and taught at Drumballyroney Church and School House, between Rathfriland and Moneyslane. The Brontë Homeland Interpretative Centre is at Drumballyroney.
- Andrew George Scott (alias "Captain Moonlight") was born in Rathfriland in 1842 in a house on Castle Hill. A notorious Australian bushranger.
- Margaret Byers (née Morrow) was born in Rathfriland in 1832. Margaret Byers was a teacher, a businesswoman, a pioneer of higher education for girls, a philanthropist and a suffragist. She was given an honorary degree by Trinity College, Dublin in 1905, and in 1908 Queen's University, Belfast appointed her to its senate.
- Francis Brooks (1924-2010) was born in Rathfriland. He was a former bishop of the Roman Catholic Diocese of Dromore.
- William Huston Dodd (1844–1930) was born in Rathfriland, and was educated at the Royal Belfast Academical Institution and Queen's College, Belfast. In 1873 he was called to the bar and served as a High Court judge from 1907 to 1924.
- Patrick Shea OBE (1908–1986) was born in County Westmeath and since his father was a policeman, he spent his childhood in Athlone, Clones, County Monaghan, Rathfriland and Newry, County Down. Patrick Shea joined the Northern Ireland Civil Service and attained the rank of permanent secretary in the Department of Education. He wrote Voices and the Sound of Drums. He was made an honorary member of the Royal Society of Ulster Architects in 1971 and a fellow of the Royal Society of Arts in 1977.
- John McAlery (1848/49–1925), Irish association football pioneer, founder of first Irish football team (Cliftonville F.C.) in 1879, captained Ireland in its first-ever international match in 1882
- Catherine O'Hare Schubert (born 23 April 1835 in Rathfriland, County Down, Ireland; died 18 July 1918 in Armstrong, British Columbia). Catherine Schubert was the only female member of the 1862 Overlanders, a group of some 150 settlers who travelled from Fort Garry (now Winnipeg, Manitoba) to the interior of British Columbia, following the Cariboo Gold Rush.
