= Leitrim, County Down =

Hamlet in Northern Ireland

Coordinates: 54.285506°N 5.9982461°W

Leitrim: Irish: Liatroim
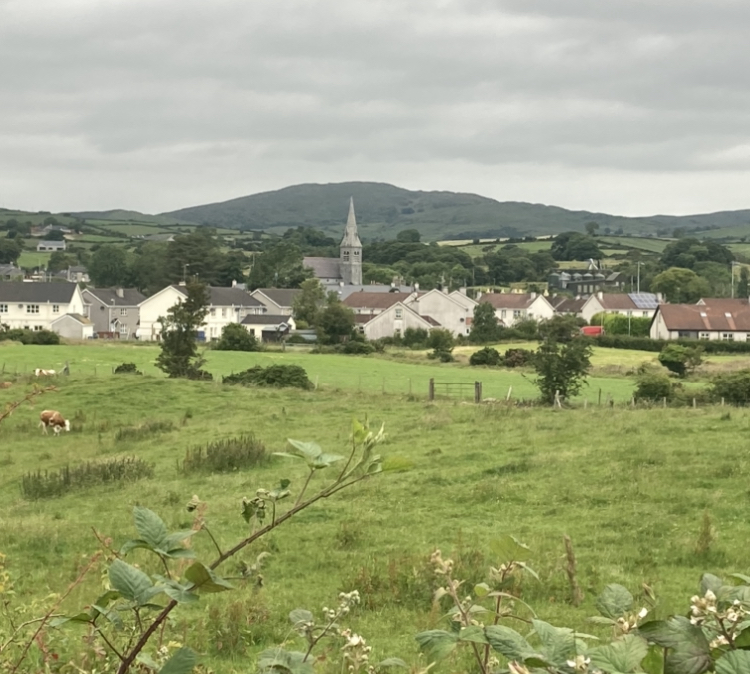
- Leitrim from the view of Mccartans road, July 2022

- Location within County Down
- Population: 190 (2021 Census)
- District: Newry, Mourne and Down
- County: County Down
- Country: Northern Ireland
- Sovereign state: United Kingdom
- Post town: CASTLEWELLAN
- Postcode district: BT31
- Dialling code: 028
- Police: Northern Ireland
- Fire: Northern Ireland
- Ambulance: Northern Ireland
- UK Parliament: South Down
- NI Assembly: South Down

Leitrim (from Irish Liatroim 'grey ridge'; /ˈliːtrəm/ LEE-trəm), is a small village in County Down, Northern Ireland, approximately 3 miles from Castlewellan, near Dromara, in the parish of Drumgooland. It is set between the Dromara Hills (Slieve Croob) and the Mourne Mountains. It is claimed to be home to the MacCartan clan of Kinelarty.

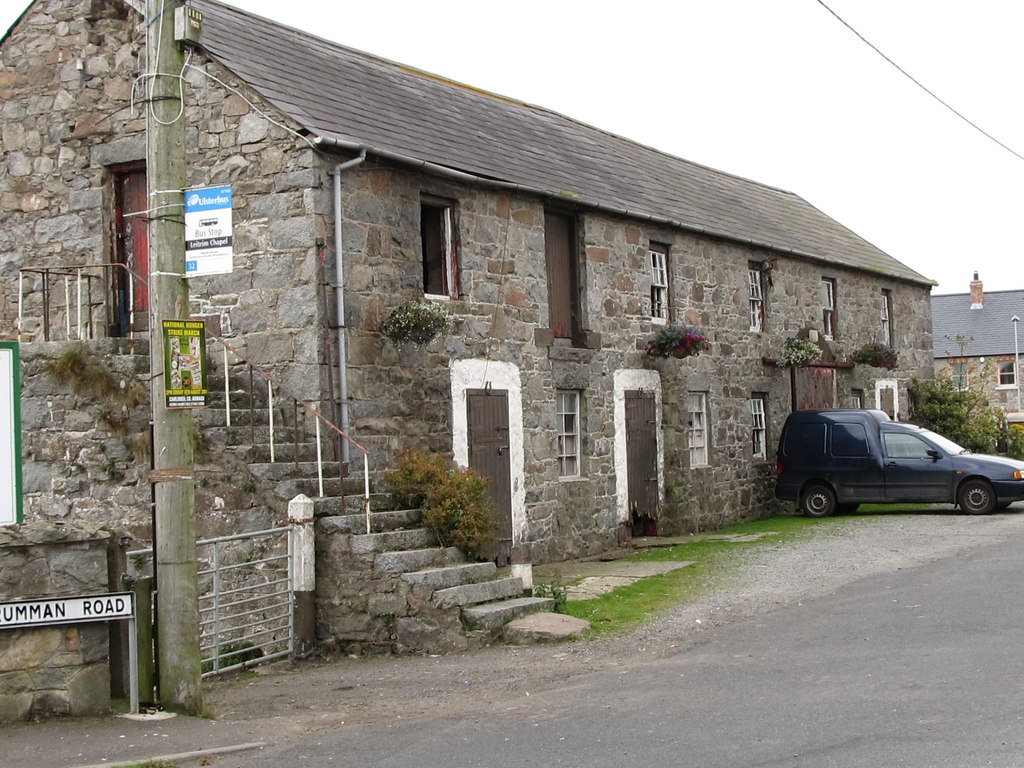
Former Inn stables at Leitrim

Within the centre of Leitrim village there is a Catholic church, a shop and a bar. Along the Backaderry road there is also a pre-school, an animal feed factory and the local Gaelic club.

Leitrim's Gaelic club (Liatroim Fontenoys GAC) is reputed to be the oldest in Down, having been founded in 1888. Leitrim has developed friendly rivalries with Kilcoo GAC and Castlewellan GAC. Every year since 1996 (with the exception of 2020, due to the COVID-19 pandemic), Leitrim has held a festival in and around the club grounds.

== History ==
=== Early history ===
Legananny Dolmen, a megalithic dolmen or cromlech, is located nearby on the slopes of Slieve Croob, it is one of the earliest still existing signs of life within the area.

=== Dolly's Brae ===
On 12 July 1849 up to 1400 armed Orangemen marched from Rathfriland to Tollymore Park. On their journey, they passed through the mainly Catholic area of Dolly's Brae, on the outskirts of Leitrim, where a party of 300–400 armed Catholic Ribbonmen, many of which from the local area, were stationed along the road, ready to open fire on the procession, however they were persuaded by the local Catholic priest, Father Morgan, to hold their fire. The Orangemen then passed through without any further trouble.

However, on the Orangemens' return home, this would not be repeated, the Ribbonmen had moved to station themselves upon Magheramayo Hill. As the tail of the procession was passing beneath the hill, an unknown party set off a squib. Two shots then rang out, followed by a volley from the Ribbonmen. The firing then became general. None of the Orangemen were harmed, but in retaliation, the Orangeman burnt down Catholic homes, killed at least four civilians, and caused damage to Gargary chapel, which was the oldest standing Catholic Church in the Leitrim area, being constructed in 1784.

=== Liatroim Fontenoys ===
Liatroim Fontenoys GAC, founded in February 1888, was established by Thomas, Joseph, and Patrick McAleenan, brothers from the nearby townland Ballymaginaghy. The brothers were working in Dublin during 1887, while there, they met Maurice Davin and Michael Cusack, two of the founders of the Gaelic Athletic Association. Around this time J.L. Savage, from the townland of Backaderry, learned about Gaelic games. In 1888, Savage and the McAleenan brothers founded Liatroim Fontenoys GAC, named after the Battle of Fontenoy in which an Irish Brigade helped the French to a victory over the British (part of the War of the Austrian Succession).

=== Early 20th century ===
During the Irish War of Independence, Irish Republican Army (IRA) membership in Leitrim fell under the Third Brigade, of the Third Northern Division. The Leitrim Company was included in the 1st Castlewellan Battalion.

By 11 July 1921, the date of The Truce which ended all actions officially commanded by IRA HQ (outside Northern Ireland), the Leitrim Company had 17 members. However, via the signing of the Anglo-Irish Treaty soon after, the Third Brigade would cease to exist.

By the beginning of the Civil War, the Third Brigade had regrouped as part of the Anti-Treaty IRA. The Leitrim Company was split into two separate companies, the pre-existing Leitrim Company, as well as the Gargory (Gargarry) Company. On 1 July 1922, the Leitrim Company had 29 members, while the Gargory company had 35 members.

=== Church of Immaculate Conception ===
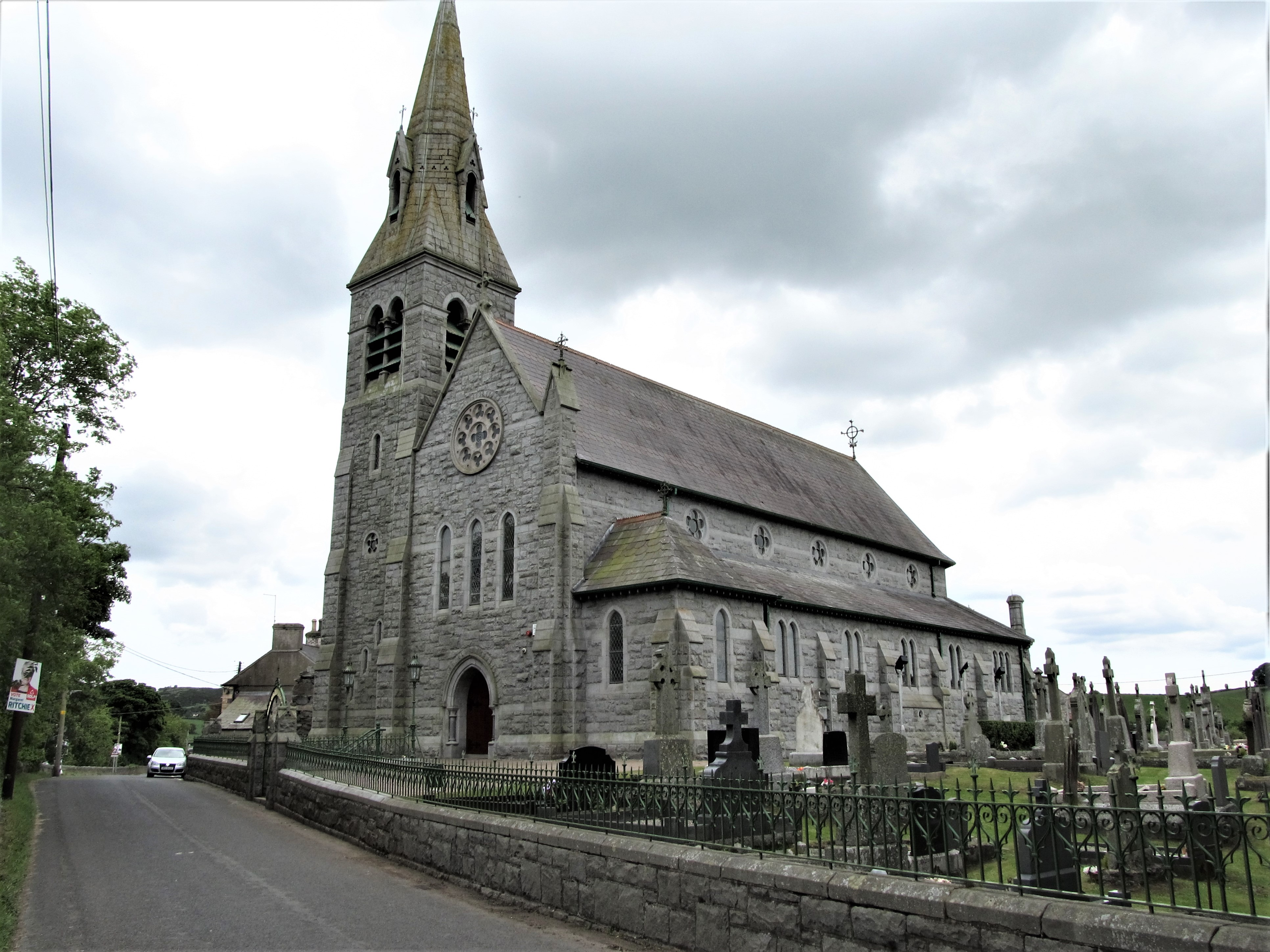
The Church of the Immaculate Conception, Leitrim

The Church of Immaculate Conception is the main centre for Catholic worship within Leitrim village, it was constructed in 1786, atop land donated by the McCartan clan on the site of an old Mass rock. The church was renovated for the first time in 1835, the original church was described as a plain, rectangular building, with open seats and a gallery. In 1840, a plot of land next to the church was purchased to be used as a burial ground.

The church was then rebuilt under Rev. Arthur J. Finnegan in 1871, the architect, Timothy Heavy, with donations from the community, constructed a mosaic floor, marble steps, the Stations of the Cross and the church's stained glass windows. However the church's spire remained unfinished until it was subsequently completed in 1874.

The church's interior was redecorated almost completely in 1924, although most of the work completed in the 1871 reconstruction remained untouched.

The final renovation of the church commenced on 3 February 1998, and was well into competition by 2 July 1998 when, as part of the Troubles, it was targeted by Loyalist arsonists, suffering damage which resulted in its closure and the halt of any work taking place at the time. Work did not recommence until 12 January 1999 and was completed in December of that year. On the 5 December, Most Rev. John McAreavey, Bishop of Dromore, accompanied by a large congregation, rededicated the Church.

=== Leitrim railway station ===
Leitrim railway station, opened on 24 March 1906, served as part of Great Northern Railway, linking Banbridge to Castlewellan. The station served the village for 49 years until its eventual closure on 2 May 1955. Following the closures of many smaller railway stations like Leitrim, the Great Northern Railway formally dissolved in May 1958.

== Demography ==
=== 2021 census ===
Residents could identify as more than one nationality.

National Identity of the Leitrim area's residents (2021)
| Nationality | Per cent |
| Irish | 56.17% |
| Northern Irish | 24.56% |
| British | 12.08% |

On Census Day (2021) according to NISRA, the usual resident population of Leitrim village was 190, an increase of 40 people from 2011, in which the population of the village was 150.

The population of Slieve Croob E4 and Slieve Croob E2, two census data zones which incorporates most of Leitrim village and a large area of the surrounding countryside, was 1,490. As NISRA does not release full demographic information for small settlements such as Leitrim, the figures shown below are from the Slieve Croob E4 and Slieve Croob E2 data zones only and may not be fully representative of the Leitrim population.

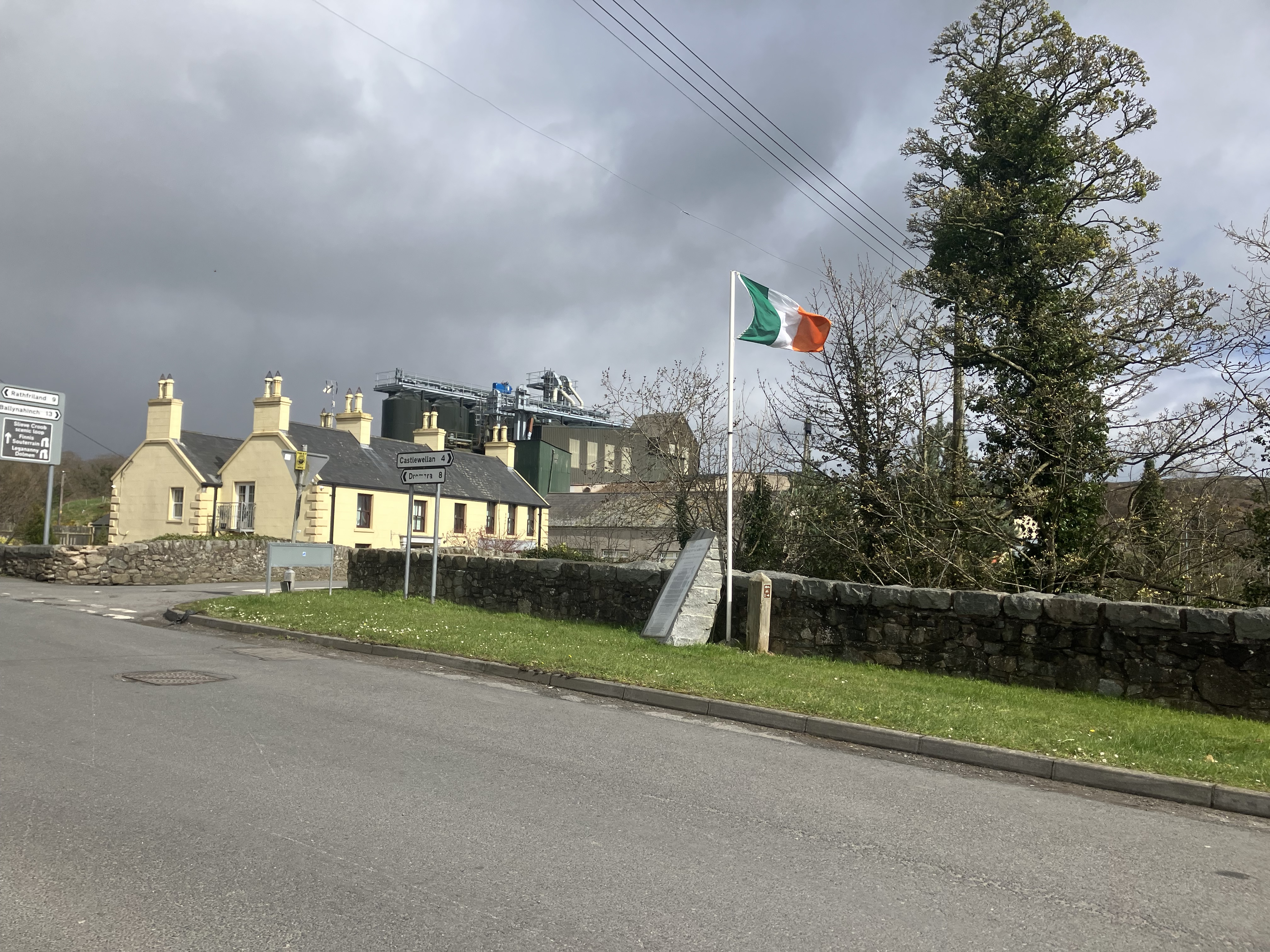

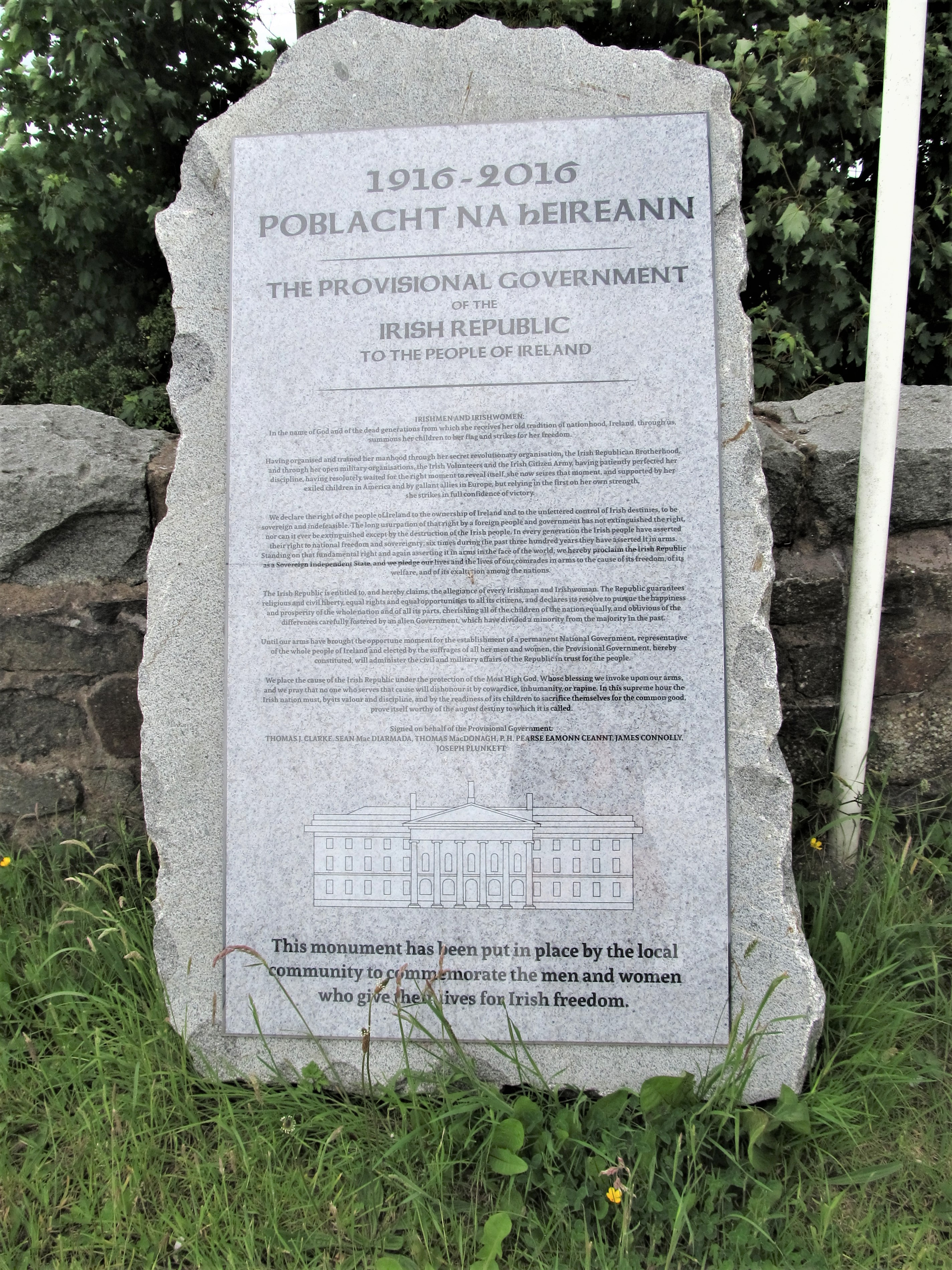
Close up of the memorial.

Bridge at the centre of Leitrim village on Easter Sunday, April 2026. The national flag of Ireland flying above an Easter Rising memorial.
- 80.87% (1,205) identified as Roman Catholic religion,
- 11.34% (169) identified as 'Protestant and Other Christian' religion,
- 7.72% (115) had no religious background.
- 56.17% (837) had an Irish only identity,
- 24.56% (366) had a Northern Irish only identity,
- 12.08% (180) indicated that they had a British only identity.

=== Historic data ===
The townland of Leitrim (Containing but not solely consisting of Leitrim village) first appears on Pender's Census of Ireland in 1659, in which it is referred to as "Lettrym". At the time, the townland was described as containing 17 Irish families and 2 "English/Scotts" families. By the 1841 census, the number of families living in the townland was 103, the population listed as 551, 15% of those living there receiving Famine relief.

== Notable people ==
- Tom Herron, Irish motorcyclist. Born in Lisburn, County Antrim, Herron spent his childhood in Leitrim. After Herron's death he was buried at Leitrim Presbyterian church, not far outside the village.

== See also ==
- List of townlands in County Down
- List of places in County Down
- List of towns and villages in Northern Ireland
