= Pender's Census of Ireland =

Pender's Census, or Petty's Census, was undertaken by the English economist William Petty between December 1654 and 1659. This 'census' was completed on behalf of the Commonwealth government probably as part of the Down Survey.

== Content ==
The census provides returns of the inhabitants of most of the country, arranged in counties, baronies, parishes and townlands. The counties of Cavan, Galway, Wicklow, Mayo, Tyrone and most of Meath are not included. The number of English, Irish and Scotch in each townland was also noted. These designations of nationality are vague; 'Irish' may refer to those who speak the language and English may refer to only the newest settlers. The 'Scotch' are found widespread in Ulster, with the exception of Co. Monaghan and Co. Antrim. This census gives no Scotch settlers in the provinces of Munster and Connacht, where the Irish outnumber the English by a ten to one ratio.

In addition to this, the 'census' also recorded the names of those with titles to land and are referred to as 'Tituladoes'. A Titulado may have been a land-owner, but did not necessarily own land. The census also recorded the principal Irish surnames in each barony.

== Discovery ==
The original papers were discovered amongst the Lansdowne manuscripts in Bowood House, Wiltshire by W. H. Hardinge. He announced his discovery in a paper read before the Royal Irish Academy in 1864. The papers were edited by Séamus Pender and were published by the Manuscripts Commission in 1939.

== Significance ==
Although it is not a true census and lacks information for some key counties, Pender's Census is important for historians and genealogists alike as almost no other records survive for the Ireland of this period. The census also allowed a population estimate for this period; Hardinge gave a figure of around 500,000 at the time.

When published in 1939, Pender considered it to be a count of the whole population and, therefore, a census. More recent opinion, however, considers it to essentially be a poll tax, levied on every head of household counted.

== See also ==
- Down Survey
- Civil Survey
