= Slieve Croob =

Mountain in Northern Ireland

- Sliabh Crúibe
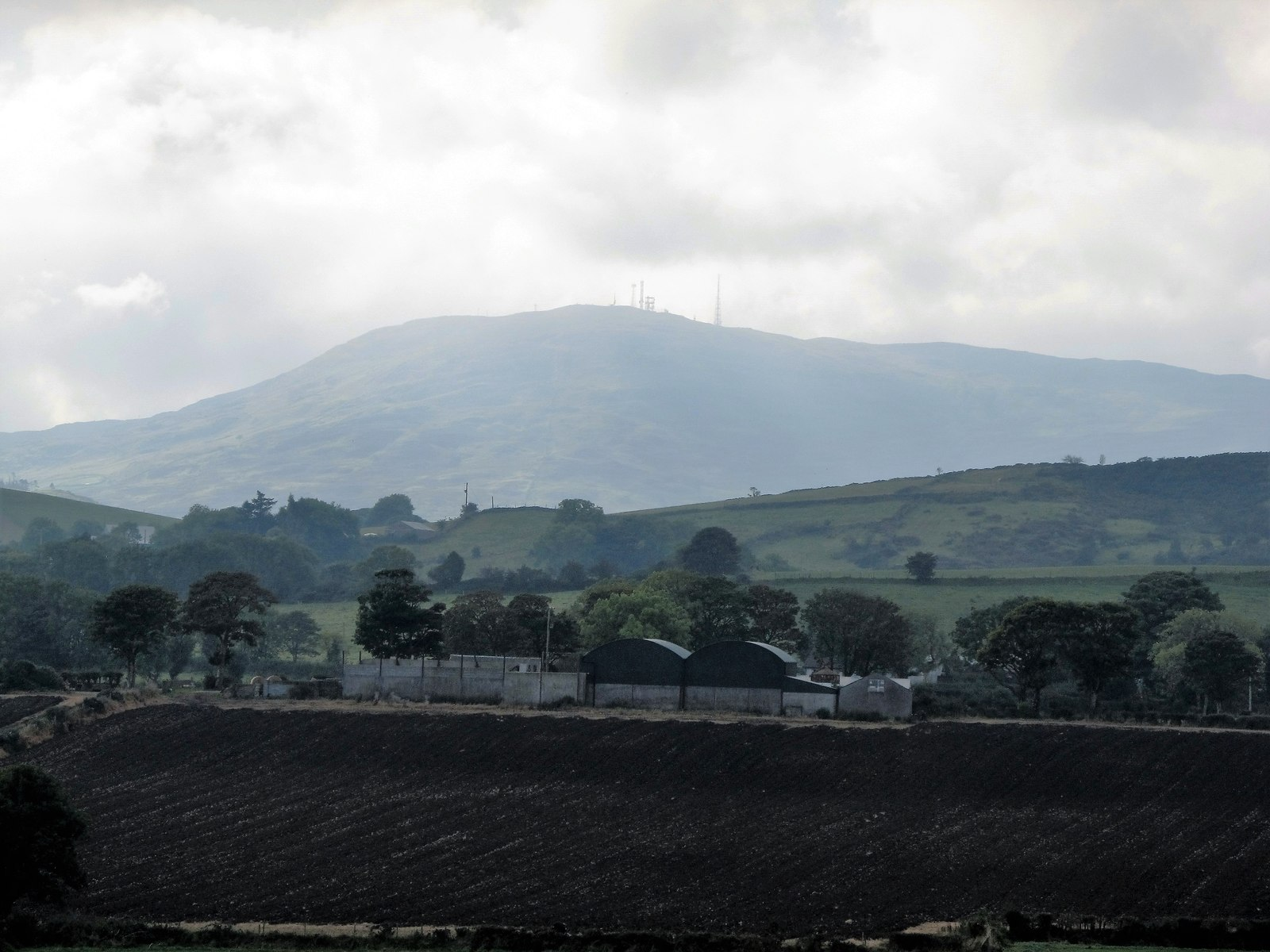
- Slieve Croob from the north

Highest point
- Elevation: 534 m (1,752 ft)
- Prominence: 439 m (1,440 ft)
- Listing: Marilyn
- Coordinates: 54°20′24″N 5°58′25″W

Naming
- English translation: mountain of the hoof
- Language of name: Irish

Geography
- Location within Northern Ireland
- Location: County Down, Northern Ireland
- Parent range: Dromara Hills
- OSI/OSNI grid: J318453

Slieve Croob (SLEEV CROOB; from Irish Sliabh Crúibe 'mountain of the hoof') is a mountain with a height of 534 metres (1,752 ft) in the middle of County Down, Northern Ireland. It is the heart of a mountainous area, the Dromara Hills, north of the Mourne Mountains. It is designated an Area of Outstanding Natural Beauty and is the source of the River Lagan. There is a small road to the summit, where there is an ancient burial cairn and several transmitter stations with radio masts. It has wide views over all of County Down and further afield. The Dromara Hills also includes Slievenisky, Cratlieve, Slievegarran and Slievenaboley.

Slieve Croob may have been the mountain named Brí Erigi or Brí Airige in medieval writings. The cairn on its summit is believed to be the remains of an ancient burial mound, possibly of a passage tomb like the one on Slieve Gullion. In the 19th century it was recorded to be 77 yards (70 m) around and 18 yards (16 m) in "conical height", with forty-two "pillar stones" or kerbstones around the edge. The cairn would have had a well-defined shape when it was built. Still, over time it has slipped and been damaged by visitors. Irish folklore holds that it is bad luck to damage such cairns. Some of its stones have been piled into smaller cairns on top of it, which led to the summit being nicknamed 'The Twelve Cairns'. Traditionally, people would gather on the summit at Lughnasadh where they would add a stone to one of the cairns. They would collect and eat bilberries and there would be folk music, dancing and games.

Local people still climb the mountain on the first Sunday in August (referred to as Cairn Sunday or Blaeberry Sunday), and carry a stone up the mountain to help bury the twelve Kings, who are said to be buried at the top.

Legannany Dolmen sits on the southern slopes of Slieve Croob near the village of Leitrim.

== Gallery ==
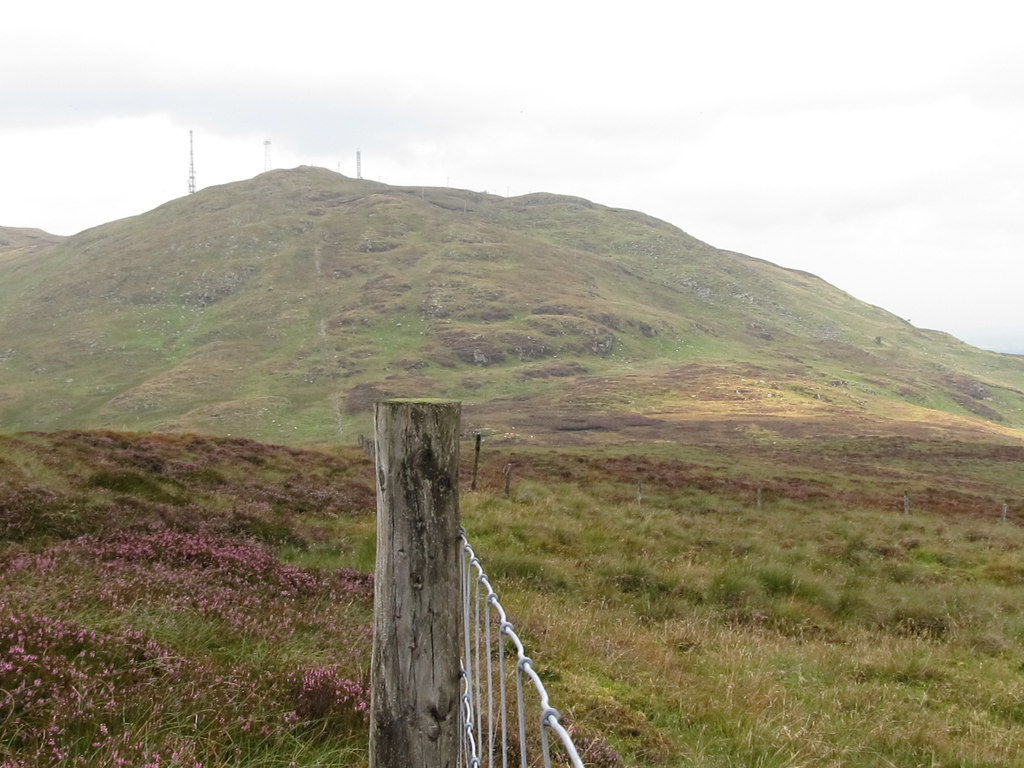
Slieve Croob from Slievenisky

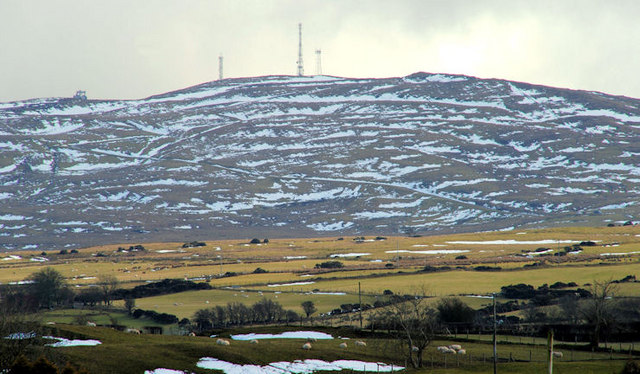
Slieve Croob from the west, covered with patches of snow

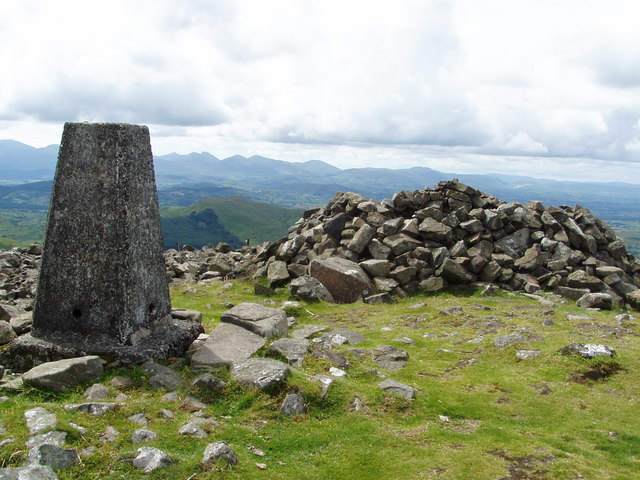
The summit, looking towards the Mournes

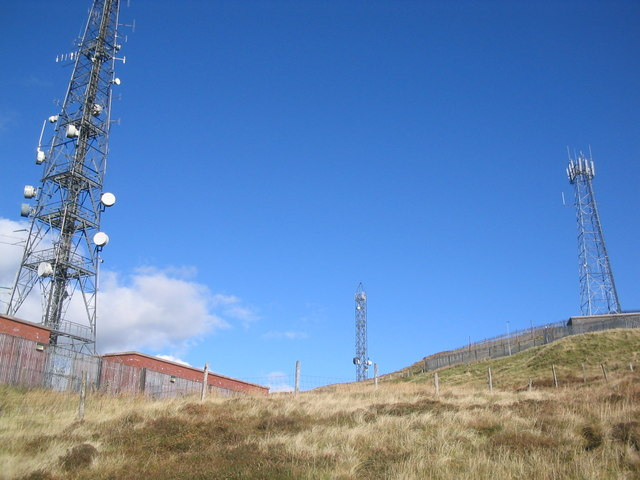
Communications towers on Slieve Croob
