= Castlewellan =

Town in County Down, Northern Ireland

Coordinates: 54.267°N 5.933°W

Castlewellan: Irish: Caisleán Uidhilín
- Town
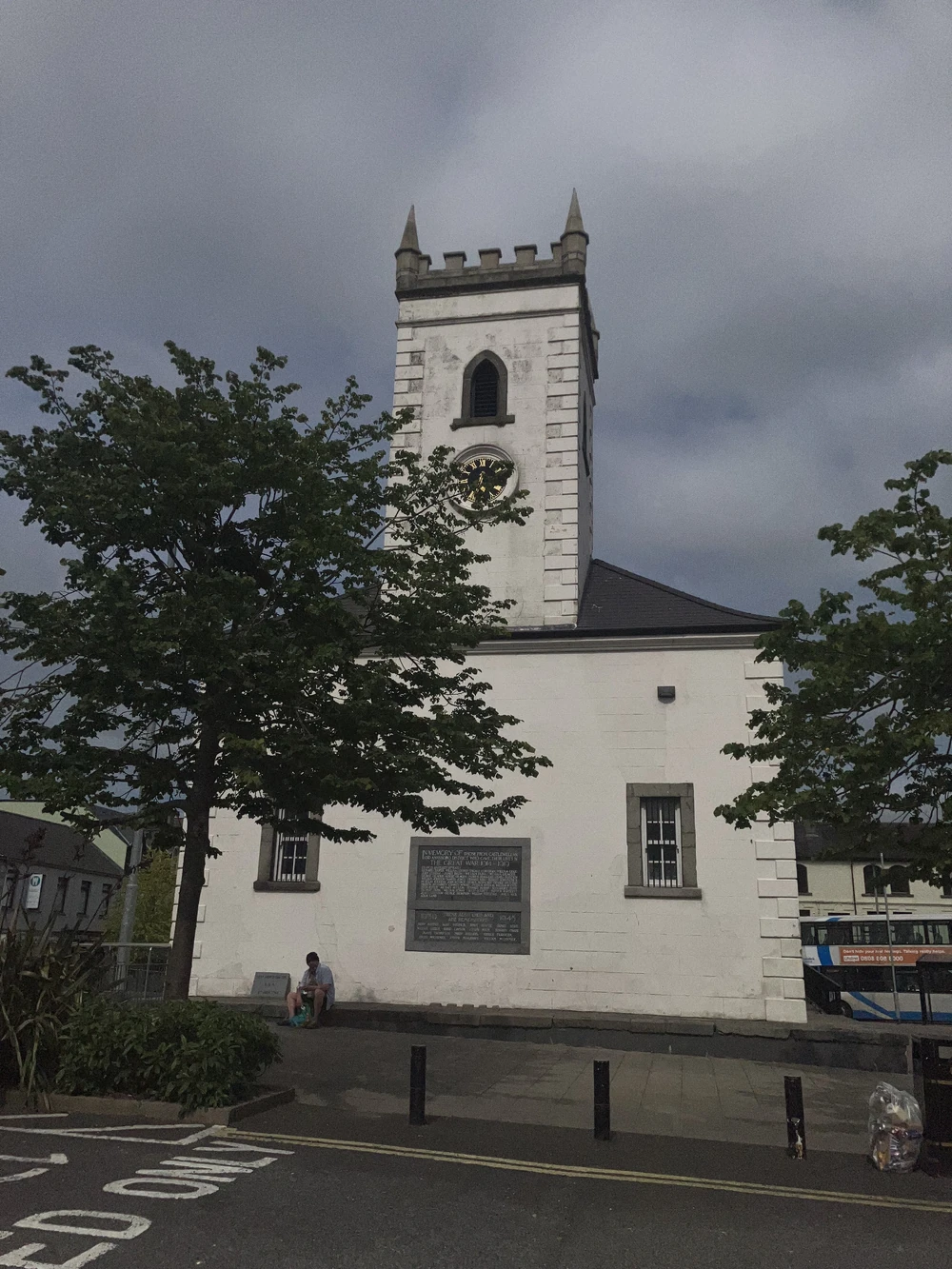
- Castlewellan Market House

- Location within County Down
- Population: 2,822 (2021 census)
- District: Newry, Mourne and Down
- County: County Down
- Country: Northern Ireland
- Sovereign state: United Kingdom
- Post town: CASTLEWELLAN
- Postcode district: BT31
- Dialling code: 028
- UK Parliament: South Down
- NI Assembly: South Down

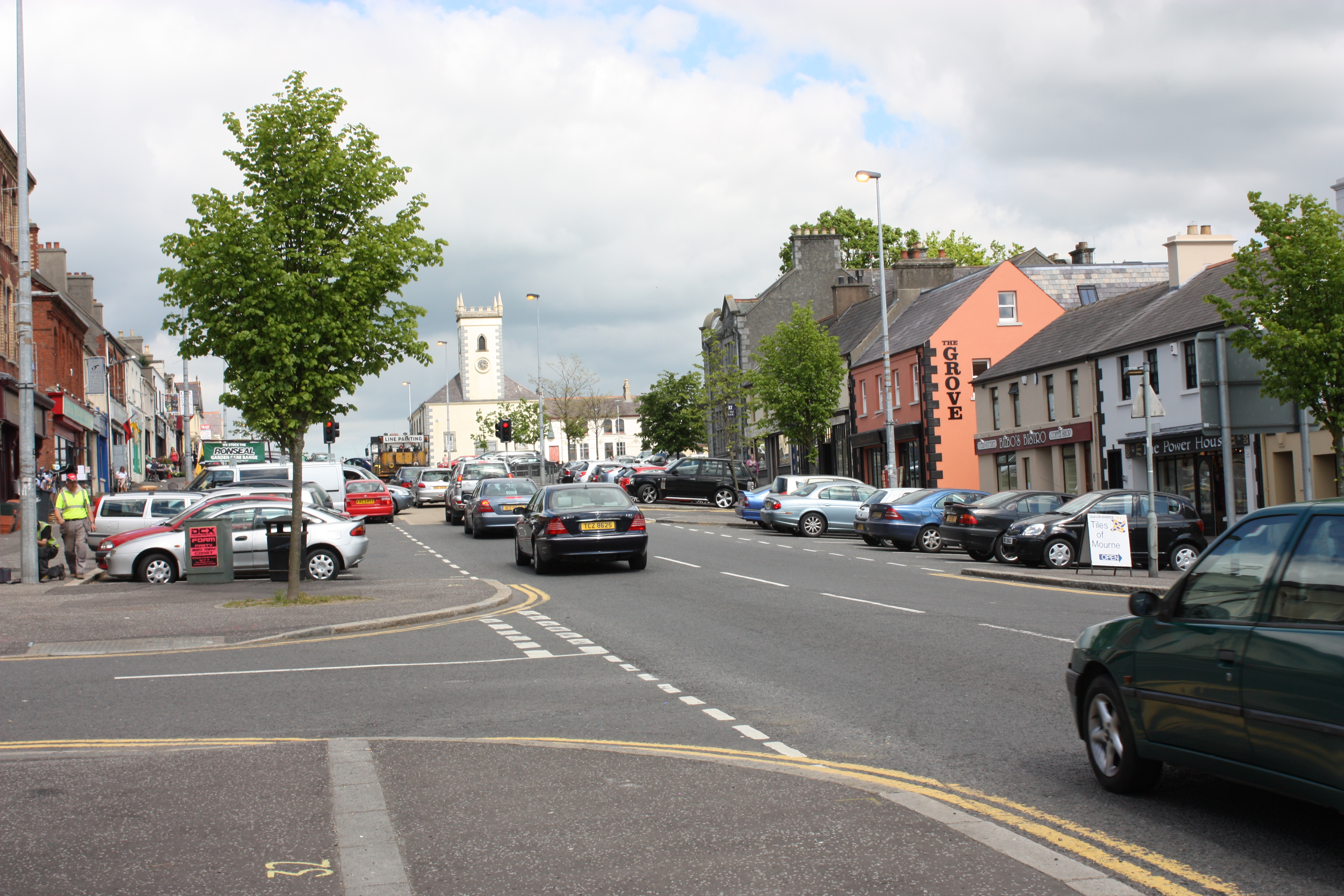
Main Street, Castlewellan, May 2010

Castlewellan (from Irish Caisleán Uidhilín, meaning 'Hugelin's castle') is a small market town in County Down, in the south-east of Northern Ireland close to the Irish Sea. It is 11 miles (18 km) south-west of Downpatrick and 4 miles (6.4 km) north-west of Newcastle. Lying between the Mourne Mountains and Slieve Croob, it has Castlewellan lake and Slievenaslat mountain nearby. The town had a population of 2,822 people in the 2021 census.

Castlewellan has a wide main street which runs through two main squares lined with chestnut trees. The town was designed by a French architect for the Annesley family. The Annesley family did not always own the land as they bought it from the Maginess family, then owners of what is now Castlewellan Christian Conference Centre and Castlewellan Forest Park. Castlewellan is unique within Ireland due to its tree-lined squares both in the old town (upper square) and new town (lower square) as well as its very wide main street. The old market house in the upper square was built in 1764 and now houses the public library.

== History ==
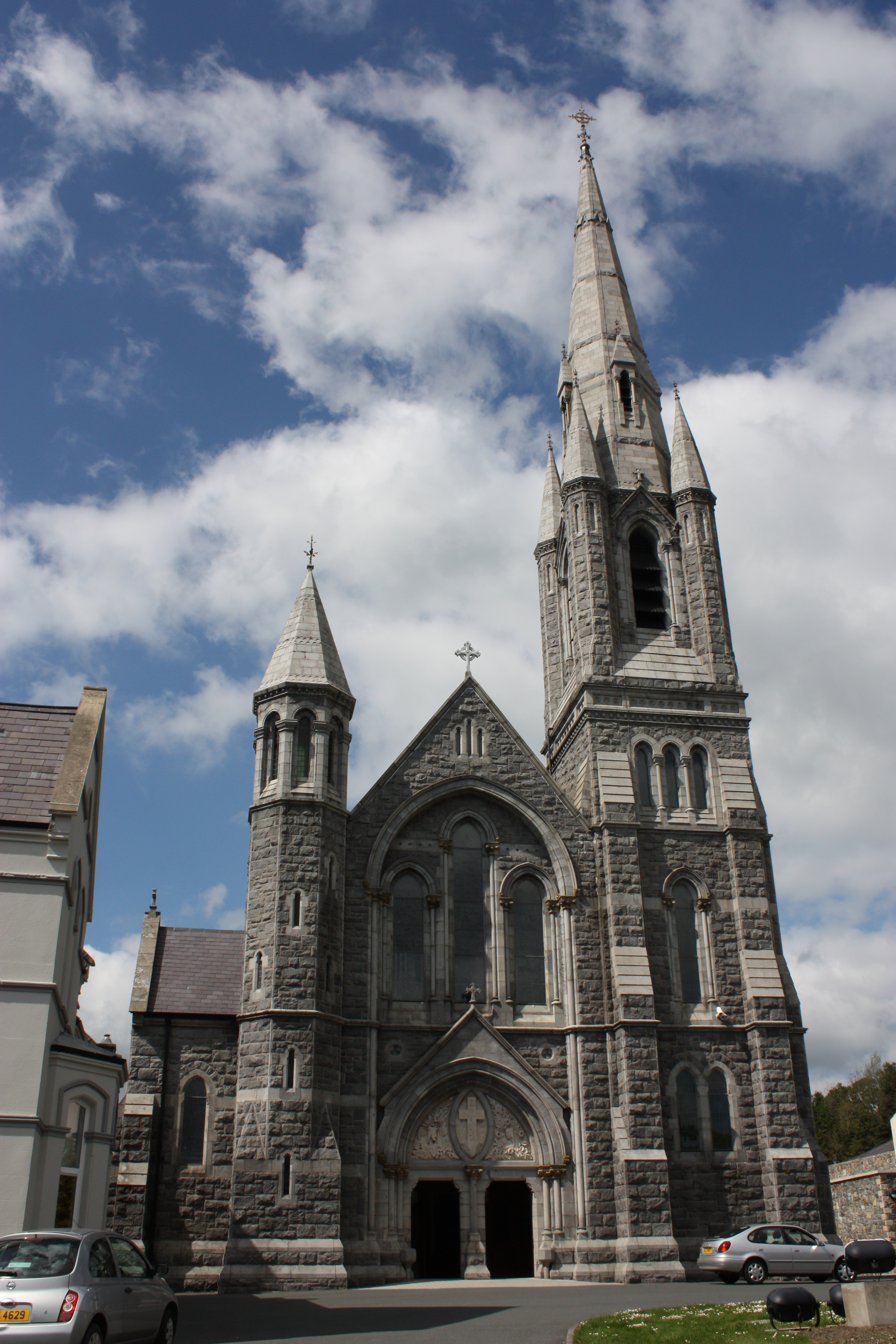
St Malachy's Roman Catholic Church, May 2010

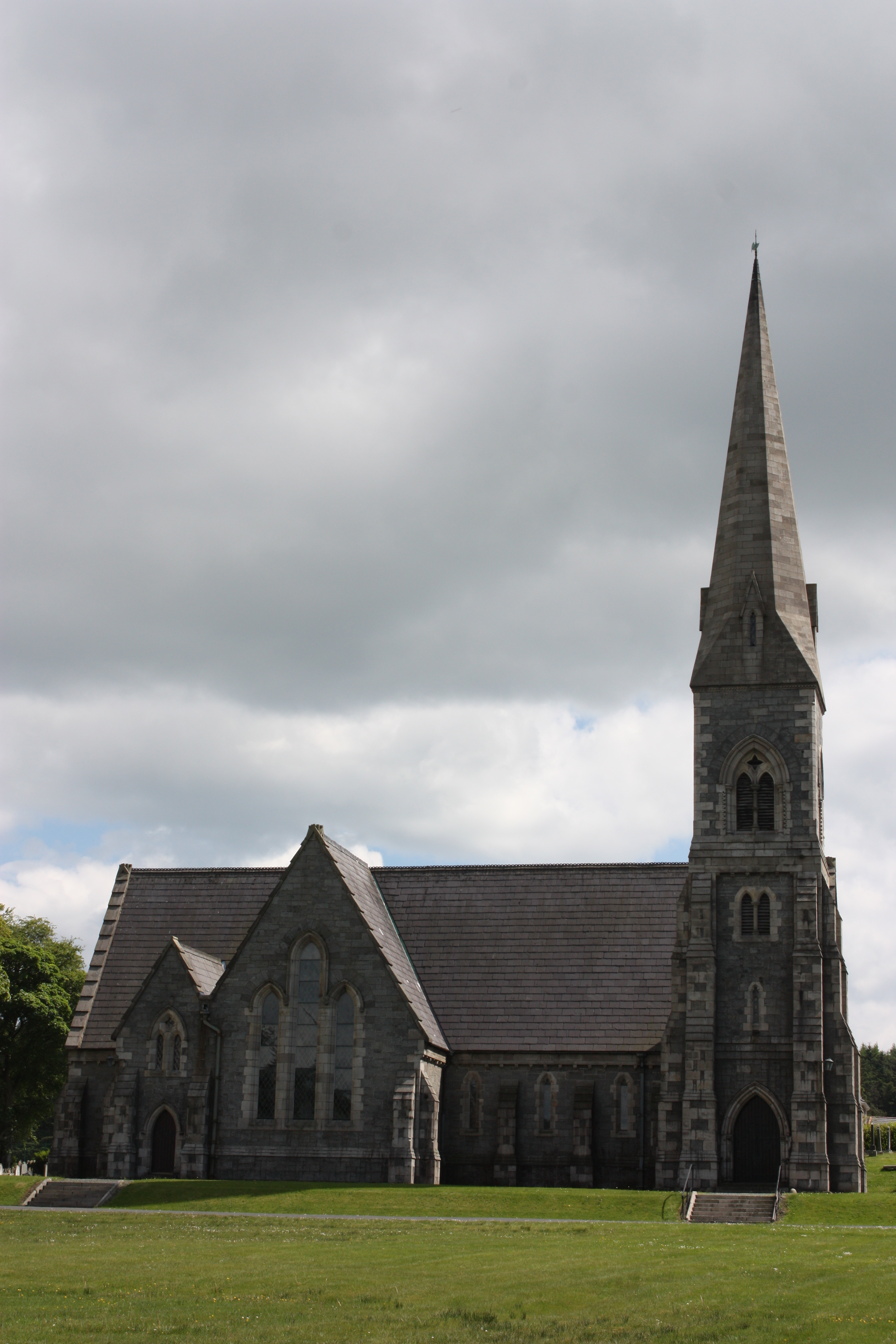
St Paul's Church of Ireland, May 2010

Evidence of ancient settlement in the area includes the Drumena Cashel - a small stone-built farmstead enclosure (or cashel) from the Early Christian period. It is 2 miles (3 km) south west of Castlewellan off the A25 road to Rathfriland. Within the cashel walls is an Iron Age underground souterrain. Also nearby is Legannany Dolmen, approximately 3 miles (4.8 km) to the north near the village of Leitrim, on the slopes of Slieve Croob. Goward Dolmen is a megalithic monument 2 miles (3.2 km) from Hilltown on the road to Castlewellan. The huge granite capstone of this structure has slipped from its original horizontal position.

12 July 1849 saw the Dolly's Brae conflict. Up to 1400 armed Orangemen marched from Rathfriland to Tollymore Park near Castlewellan, County Down. On their homeward journey, shots were fired and police were unable to control the situation. None of the Orangemen were harmed, but it was estimated that about 80 Catholics were killed and homes burnt.

Castlewellan Castle, a Scottish baronial castle of 1856, Castlewellan Lake in what is now Castlewellan Forest Park. The castle is now used as a privately run Christian conference centre, and is not generally open to the public.

According to the Sunday Times Insight Team, the entire village (the population then was given as 819) was bound over to keep the peace for a year in 1953 after disorder at an Orange walk.

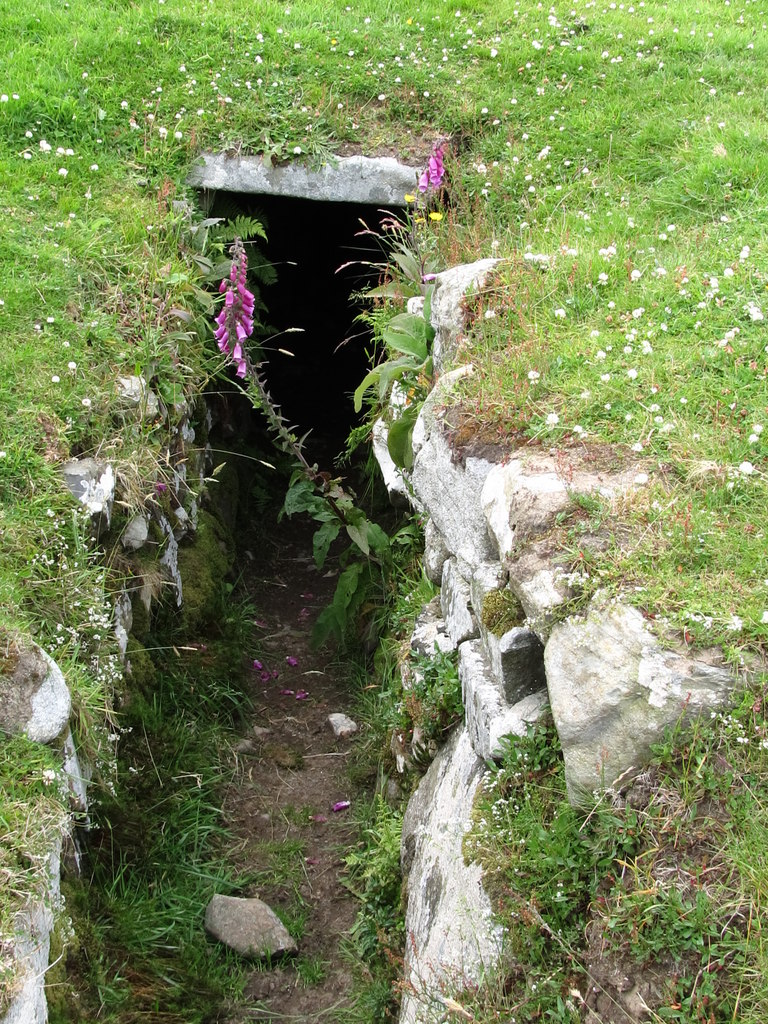
Southern entrance to the souterrain at Drumena Cashel

=== The Troubles ===
A number of incidents occurred in Castlewellan during the Troubles. For example, in January 1980, three members of the Ulster Defence Regiment were killed in a Provisional Irish Republican Army land mine attack on their mobile patrol near Castlewellan. Those killed included James Cochrane (21, a Catholic), Robert Smyth (18, a Protestant), and Richard Wilson (21, a Protestant).

Castlewellan has historically been an Irish Republican town. In 2016, a large Republican commemoration of the 1916 Rising was held in the town. A march, commemorating the 1981 hunger strikes, was also held there in 2018.

Throughout the course of the Troubles, the area had a significant paramilitary presence, mostly involving Provisional Irish Republican Army (PIRA) activity. In 2009, the Real Irish Republican Army claimed responsibility a car bomb which had been abandoned in the area.

== Amenities ==
Castlewellan Forest Park and Castlewellan Lake are situated to the northwest of the town. The arboretum in the park was begun in 1740 and contains plants and trees from several different countries, including Spain, Mexico and Wales; the 'Castlewellan Gold' form of Leyland Cypress – originating from a single mutant tree in the arboretum and widely propagated from the 1970s – was selected by the park director, John Keown, being first named Cupressus macrocarpa Keownii, 1963. The Peace Maze was constructed in the park between 2000 and 2001. Until 2007 it was the longest permanent hedge maze in the world.

== Schools ==
Schools serving the Castlewellan area include:

- St Mary's Primary School, Aughlisnafin
- Annsborough Primary School
- Castlewellan Primary School
- St. Malachy's Primary School, Castlewellan
- St. Malachy's High School, Castlewellan
- Bunscoil Bheanna Boirche

== Transport ==
Castlewellan railway station was opened on 24 March 1906 by the Great Northern Railway of Ireland, but closed on 2 May 1955.

Trains used to connect Newcastle and Belfast via Lisburn.

== Events ==
The Celtic Fusion International Musical Arts Festival was held annually in the town for a number of years, starting in 2002.

The Soma Festival is an annual festival held in the town since 2013. It is a festival of live music, family, well-being, food and drink.

== Sport ==
The local Gaelic Athletic Association club, Castlewellan GAC, is based in the town. Other local sports clubs include the association football (soccer) club, Castlewellan Town FC. Castlewellan lake has played host to the Queen's University Belfast Boat Club regatta.

== Demography ==
=== 2021 census ===
On the day of the 2021 census (21 March 2021), the usually resident population of Castlewellan was 2,822, accounting for 0.15% of the NI total. Of these:

- 24.30% were under 16 years old and 13.40% were aged 65 and above.
- 51.02% of the population were male and 48.98% were female.
- 90.30% were from a Catholic community background and 5.47% were from a 'Protestant and Other Christian (including Christian related)' community background.
- 63.97% indicated they had an Irish national identity, 25.26% said they had a Northern Irish national identity and 10.48% gave a British national identity (respondents could indicate more than one national identity).

=== 2011 census ===
In the 2011 census, Castlewellan was classified as an intermediate settlement by the Northern Ireland Statistics and Research Agency (NISRA) (i.e. with a population between 2,500 and 4,999 people). On the day of the 2011 census (27 March 2011), the usually resident population of Castlewellan was 2,782, accounting for 0.15% of the NI total. Of these:

- 24.84% were under 16 years old and 10.96% were aged 65 and above.
- 48.71% of the population were male and 51.29% were female.
- 90.29% were from a Catholic community background and 6.51% were from a 'Protestant and Other Christian (including Christian related)' community background.
- 54.31% indicated they had an Irish national identity, 29.58% said they had a Northern Irish national identity and 17.69% gave a British national identity (respondents could indicate more than one national identity).

=== 2001 census ===
In the 2001 census, Castlewellan was also classified as an intermediate settlement by the NI Statistics and Research Agency (NISRA) (i.e. with population between 2,250 and 4,500 people). On that census day (29 April 2001), there were 2,392 people living in Castlewellan. Of these:

- 29.8% were aged under 16 and 13.8% were aged 60 and over.
- 49.4% of the population were male and 50.6% were female.
- 92.1% were from a Catholic background and 6.6% were from a Protestant background
- 4.8% of people aged 16–74 were unemployed.

== Notable people ==
- Greer Garson (1904–1996), actress
- Percy Jocelyn (1764–1843), Anglican bishop
- Niamh McGrady (b. 1983), actress
- Eileen O'Higgins, actress
- Séamus Ó Néill (1910–1981), Irish writer
- Joe Toner (1894–1954), soccer player.

== See also ==
- Market houses in Northern Ireland
