= List of archaeological sites in County Down =

List of archaeological sites in County Down, Northern Ireland:

== A ==
- Aghavilly, Cashel and souterrain, grid ref: J1514 2272
- Annaghanoon, Rath, grid ref: J1152 5241
- Ardgeehan, Rath, grid ref: J6231 5131
- Ardglass, 15th century Merchants’ stores ‘Newark’: Ardglass Castle, grid ref: J5615 3710
- Ardglass, Tower house: Margaret's Castle, grid ref: J5603 3703
- Ardglass, Tower house: Cowd Castle or Choud Castle, grid ref: J5606 3705
- Ardilea, Motte, grid ref: J4164 3914
- Ardkeen, Motte and bailey with later tower house: Castle Hill, grid ref: J5935 5710
- Ardkeen, Church and graveyard and coffin lids (2), grid ref: J5941 5670
- Ardquin, Manor house and ecclesiastical site: the Abbacy, grid ref: J5580 5447
- Ardtole, Souterrain, grid ref: J5638 3811 (near Ardtole Church)
- Audleystown, Church and graveyard: Templecormick, grid ref: J5664 5050
- Aughnafosker, Rath: Pretty Mary’s Fort, grid ref: J1485 5990
- Aughnagon, Court tomb (remains of), grid ref: J1485 2556

== B ==
- Ballaghanery, St Mary’s Church, grid ref: J3887 2672
- Ballaghbeg, World War II Pillbox, grid ref: J3764 3038
- Ballaghbeg, Harbour: Newcastle Harbour, grid ref: J381 296
- Ballaghbeg, Fish traps: Lady Annesley’s Fish Traps (2), grid refs: J3780 3016 and J3779 3060
- Balleevy, Raths (2), grid refs: J1564 4442 and J1576 4484
- Balleevy, Standing stone
- Ballinarry, Raised rath, grid ref: J5674 4493
- Ballintaggart, Standing stone
- Ballintine, Rath, grid ref: J2662 6273
- Ballintine, Mound, grid ref: J2629 6285
- Ballintur, Court tomb, grid ref: J2247 1502
- Balloo, Raised rath, grid ref: J4923 6070
- Ballooly, Standing stone, grid ref: J2086 4671
- Ballyalloly, Rath, grid ref: J4273 6815
- Ballyalton Court Cairn, Court tomb in Ballyalton townland, grid ref: J5309 4480
- Ballybeen, Standing stone: The Long Stone, grid ref: J4260 7308
- Ballybeen, Mound, grid ref: J4148 7294
- Ballybryan, Windmill stump, grid ref: Area of J586 663
- Ballycroghan, Cooking places, Area of J538 799
- Ballycroghan, Standing stone and Bronze Age burials, grid ref: J5381 8068
- Ballycroghan, Cooking places – Area A and Area B, grid refs: J5393 7970 and J5383 7944
- Ballycrune, Rath, grid ref: J3027 5648
- Ballyculter Upper, Inscribed stone, grid ref: J5714 4725
- Ballydargan, Windmill stump, grid ref: J4895 3884
- Ballydesland, Large hilltop enclosure, grid ref: J1468 2170
- Ballydollaghan, Mound, grid ref: J3366 6806
- Ballydown and Lisnaree, Rath, grid ref: J1484 4672
- Ballydugan, Bawn, grid ref: J4682 4303
- Ballydugan, Raised rath, grid ref: J4556 4227
- Ballydugan, World War II Pillboxes (2), grid refs: J0568 5377 and J0582 5432
- Ballyedock Upper, Bullaun stones (2), grid ref: J5718 4001
- Ballyferris, Shipwreck/stranding
- Ballyferris, Windmill stump, grid ref: J6287 7118
- Ballyfounder Rath, rath in Ballyfounder townland, grid ref: J6207 4954
- Ballygalget, Church and graveyard, grid ref: J6262 5418
- Ballygarvan, Kelp grid, J5870 6531
- Ballygraffan, Chambered tomb: Ballygraffan Dolmen, grid ref: JJ4730 6715
- Ballygunaghan, Bivallate rath, grid ref: J1385 5199
- Ballyhalbert, Standing stone, grid ref: J6463 6356
- Ballyhalbert, Motte, grid ref: J6470 6351
- Ballyhay, Rath, grid ref: J5754 7838
- Ballyholland Lower, Cashel and souterrain, grid ref: J1147 2580
- Ballykeel, Large hilltop enclosure, grid ref: J2633 5325
- Ballykeel, Raised rath, grid ref: J4351 4031
- Ballykeel, Rath, grid ref: J1585 3235
- Ballykeel (Holywood), Church: Holywood Priory, grid ref: J4013 7935
- Ballykinler Lower, Raised rath and motte: Lismahon, grid ref: J4293 3891
- Ballykinler Middle, Church site and graveyard, ‘Parkaneety’, grid ref: J4252 3735
- Ballylenaghan, Belvoir Motte, grid ref: J3403 6984
- Ballylesson, Multivallate fort: ‘Farrell’s Fort’, grid ref: J3354 6610
- Ballylintagh, Raths (2), grid refs: J2892 5676 and J2769 5600
- Ballylone Little, Rath, grid ref: J3823 5340
- Ballylone Little, Multivallate rath, grid ref: J3778 5364
- Ballyloughlin, Standing stones (2) (remains of megalithic tomb), grid ref: J3907 3423
- Ballymacaramery, Rath, grid ref: J3813 5447
- Ballymacaratty Beg, Rath, grid ref: J0921 3676
- Ballymacarrett, Chimney stack: Sirocco Chimney, grid ref: J3480 7417
- Ballymacateer, Rath, grid ref: J1250 5722
- Ballymackilreiny and Derryneill, Cairn and long cist: the Cove, grid ref: J2718 4143
- Ballymaganlis, Rath, grid ref: J2007 5360
- Ballymaghery, Motte, grid ref: J2223 2888
- Ballymaginaghy, Platform rath and souterrain, grid ref: J3104 3873
- Ballymaginaghy, Standing stone, grid ref: J3088 3820
- Ballymaginaghy, Cashel and souterrain, grid ref: J3098 3778
- Ballymaginaghy, Rath (otherwise known as Coen’s fort), grid ref: J3033 3865
- Ballymaglave North, Rath: Edenavaddy Hill, grid ref: J3605 5185
- Ballymalady, Motte, grid ref: J4359 6767
- Ballymartin, Cup-marked stone, grid ref: J5076 6285
- Ballyministragh, Windmill stump, grid ref: J4968 6234
- Ballymoney, Rath, grid ref: J1337 4837
- Ballymoney, Counterscarp rath, grid ref: J2805 3405
- Ballymoney, Church ruins and graveyard: Kilcoo Graveyard, grid ref: J2816 3374
- Ballymurphy, Platform rath, grid ref: J3264 5475
- Ballynahinch, Windmill stump, grid ref: J3713 5245
- Ballynaris, Mound: Phil’s Fort, grid ref: J1786 5373
- Ballynoe, Ballynoe stone circle (area around and embracing the state care monument), grid ref: J4813 4038
- Ballyoran, Standing stone, grid ref: J4434 7420
- Ballyorgan, Church site: Cappel-na-Coole, grid ref: J5712 4305
- Ballyphilip, Medieval and post-medieval church and graveyard: Templecraney, grid ref: J5941 5110
- Ballyrenan, Rath, grid ref: J4895 4703
- Ballyrickard, Motte, grid ref: J4829 7047
- Ballyrogan or Mourne Park, Court tomb, grid ref: J2818 1601
- Ballyroney, Motte and bailey: Ballyroney Castle, grid ref: J2162 3948
- Ballyroney, Standing stone, grid ref: J2147 4005
- Ballyrush, Bivallate rath, grid ref: J4333 6585
- Ballysallagh, Large circular enclosure, grid ref: J2304 5173
- Ballyskeagh High, Cairn: Cairngaver, grid ref: J4542 7656
- Ballystokes, Cup and ring marked stone, grid ref: J5263 4577
- Ballytrustan, Church and graveyard, grid ref: J1194 4983
- Ballyvally, Rath: Rough Fort, grid ref: J1153 4424
- Ballyvally, Rath, grid ref: J1648 2605
- Ballyvaston, Open field system, grid ref: Area of J493 362
- Ballyveagh More, Church site: Kimeloge, grid ref: J3445 1832
- Ballyvicknacally, Motte and bailey: Dromore Mound (area adjoining the state care monument), grid ref: J2061 5317
- Ballywalter, Windmill stump, grid ref: J6216 6918
- Ballywalter, Church and Anglo-Norman stone coffin lids (3), grid ref: J6224 6994
- Ballywillwill, Rath, grid ref: J3517 4157
- Ballyworfy, Rath: Spirehill, grid ref: J2747 3753
- Bangor Abbey (site of), includes Malachy’s wall, in Corporation (Bangor) townland, grid ref: J5015 8110
- Barnamaghery, Standing stone, grid ref: J4528 5443
- Barnmeen, Standing stone, grid ref: J1723 3302
- Barnmeen, Rath: Lisnabrean, grid ref: J1696 3336
- Barnmeen, Counterscarp rath, grid ref: J1835 3160
- Begny, Rath, grid ref: J2975 5025
- Begny, Standing stone, grid ref: J3059 5004
- Black Abbey, Benedictine abbey: Black Abbey or St Andrews in the Ards, grid ref: J6083 6750
- Bonecastle, Rath, grid ref: J4614 4103
- Braniel, Rath, grid ref: J3883 7108
- Brickland, Ring barrow: Waterhill Fort, grid ref: J1157 4060
- Bright, Tower house, grid ref: J5066 3822
- Bright, Corbelled pig crew, grid ref: J5063 3771
- Burren, Cashel, grid ref: J3165 5170
- Burren, Platform rath, grid ref: J3295 5356
- Burren, Court tomb, grid ref: J1343 2251

== C ==
- Cabragh, Enclosure: Cabragh Fort, grid ref: J2967 5949
- Carcullion, Enclosure, possible mill site, grid ref: J2065 2824
- Cargygray, Raths (2), grid refs: J3092 5476 and J3174 5413
- Carlingford Lough, 16th century artillery fort: Carlingford Block House, grid ref: J2556 0969
- Carnacavill, Ecclesiastical site: Maghera Old Church, grid ref: J3722 3411
- Carnalbanagh East (Moira), Mound, grid ref: J1522 6038
- Carnew, Rectangular enclosure: Carnew Fort, grid ref: J2376 4643
- Carnmeen, Standing stones (2), grid refs: J0825 3071 and J0807 5311
- Carrownacaw, Standing stone: the Long Stone, grid ref: J5437 4639
- Carrowreagh, Ring barrow, grid ref: J4382 7424
- Carrowreagh, Prehistoric earthworks, grid ref: J4386 7447
- Carryduff, Rath: Queen’s Fort, grid ref: J3662 6520
- Caskum, Counterscarp rath, grid ref: J1199 4282
- Castleboy, Church and tower house (ruins of), grid ref: J6252 5562
- Castle Enigan, Cashel, grid ref: J1281 3226
- Castle Espie, Shell midden, grid ref: J4971 6708
- Castle Espie, Powder and explosives store, grid ref: J4930 6713
- Castle Espie, Brick works, grid ref: J4954 6721
- Castlereagh, Barrow, grid ref: J3788 7073
- Castleskreen, Rath and motte, grid ref: J4730 4027
- Castleskreen, Rectangular enclosure and souterrain, J4732 3979
- Castleskreen, Rath and tower house, grid ref: J4658 4000
- Castleward, Tower house: Old Castle Ward, grid ref: J5740 4985
- Castleward, Standing stone, possible portal tomb remains, grid ref: J5698 4994
- Castleward, 18th century formal garden layout and canal: Temple Water Canal, grid ref: J5732 5002
- Castleward, Stone quay, grid ref: J5749 4973
- Cattogs, Deserted settlement: New Comber, grid ref: Area of J467 685
- Chapel Island (Strangford Lough), Church site and ancillary features, grid ref: Area of J554 672
- Church Quarter (Dundonald), Motte, grid ref: J4180 7388
- Clare, Crannog, grid ref: J0926 5293
- Clarkill, Cashel and souterrain, grid ref: J3400 3828
- Clarkill, Enclosure – graveyard, grid ref: J3421 3673
- Clarkill, Standing stone, grid ref: J3408 3835
- Clay, Raised rath, grid ref: J5105 5692
- Clay, Crannog in the Clea Lakes, grid ref: J5076 5561
- Clay, Tullymacnous and Tullyveery, Crannog in the Clea Lakes, grid ref: J5099 5494
- Cloghanramer and Damolly, Rath: Spring Hill Fort, grid ref: J0828 2859
- Clonallan Glebe, Rath: Rathturret, grid ref: J1547 1893
- Clontaghnaglar, Rath, grid ref: J4376 5590
- Clonvaraghan, Cashel and souterrains (2), grid refs: J3441 4115 and J3427 3953
- Commons, Strongpoint, grid ref: J4984 7298
- Coniamstown, Motte and bailey, grid ref: J5058 3974
- Conlig, Standing stone, grid ref: J4937 7783
- Coolnacran, Rath, grid ref: J1027 4282
- Coolnacran, Counterscarp raised rath, grid ref: J1053 4336
- Coolsallagh, Multi-ditched enclosure, grid ref: J1505 5412
- Corcreeghy, Rath, grid ref: J1018 3306
- Corcreeghy, Conjoined raths, grid ref: J1017 3195
- Corporation (Bangor), Bangor Abbey (site of), includes Malachy’s wall, grid ref: J5015 8110
- Corporation (Killyleagh), Ecclesiastical site, grid ref: J5242 5323
- Corporation North (Newtownards), Windmill, grid ref: J4939 7489
- Corporation (Killyleagh), Rath pair, grid ref: J5200 5149
- Cowd Castle or Choud Castle, Tower house in Ardglass, grid ref: J5606 3705
- Craigavad, Mound, grid ref: J4328 8173
- Craigboy, Platform rath, grid ref: J5862 7746
- Cranfield, Mound, grid ref: J2717 1044
- Croreagh, Rath, grid ref: J1219 2890
- Croreagh, Standing stones (2), grid ref: J12172949
- Crossnacreevy, Rath, grid ref: J3969 7016
- Cumber, Rath, grid ref: J3910 4994

== D ==
- Damolly and Cloghanramer, Rath: Spring Hill Fort, grid ref: J0828 2859
- Dane's Cast, Linear earthwork visible at several points in the following townlands:
  - Drumantine, grid refs: J0682 to J0689 3629 and J0679 3667 to J0862 3646
  - Killysavan, grid refs: J0691 to J0684 3918 and J0684 3918 to J0690 3848
  - Knocknanarny, grid ref: J0634 3471 to J0638 3437
  - Lisnabrague, grid ref: J0664 4104 to J0682 4062
  - Lisnagade, grid ref: Area of J086 439
  - Loughadian, grid ref: J0702 4006 to J0694 3969
  - Scarva, grid refs: J078 436 to J066 421, J074 433 to J078 436, J071 430 to J075 434 and J076 432 to J077 434
- Deehommed, Cashel, grid ref: J2450 4260
- Deehommed, Raths (2), grid ref: J2588 4160 and J2585 4138
- Deehommed, Chimney, grid ref: J2579 4075
- Demesne of Down, Mound and enclosure: Magnus Grave, grid ref: J4773 4357
- Demesne of Down, Cross: Downpatrick Town Cross, grid ref: J4830 4450
- Demesne of Down, Cathedral Hill, Downpatrick: earthworks and ecclesiastical site, grid ref: Area of J483 444
- Demesne of Down, Motte and enclosure: Mound of Down, grid ref: J4825 4498
- Demesne of Down, Standing stone, grid ref: J4850 4345
- Derry, Rath, grid ref: J3025 5165
- Derryboy, Rath, grid ref: J4838 5512
- Derryleckagh, Church and graveyard: Templegowran, grid ref: J1279 2645
- Derryneill, Raised rath, grid ref: J2720 3976
- Derryneill and Ballymackilreiny, Cairn and long cist: the Cove, grid ref: J2718 4143
- Donaghadee, Motte, grid ref: J5882 8009
- Donaghaguy, Barrow, grid ref: J1360 2070
- Donaghaguy, Standing stone, grid ref: J1416 1972
- Dromore, Tower house: Dromore Castle, grid ref: J2009 5323
- Dromore Mound, Motte and bailey (area adjoining the state care monument) in Ballyvicknacally townland, grid ref: J2061 5317
- Dromorebrague, Large enclosure, grid ref: J1344 4164
- Drumaghadone, Rath, grid ref: J2058 5049
- Drumaghlis, 17th-century house, ‘The Ha’, grid ref: J4216 5118
- Drumanakelly, Rath: Blackwood’s Fort, grid ref: J3915 4403
- Drumantine, Rath, grid ref: J0839 3590
- Drumantine, Dane's Cast linear earthwork, grid refs: J0682 to J0689 3629 and J0679 3667 to J0862 3646
- Drumaroad, Cashel: White Fort, grid ref: J3653 4397
- Drumbo, Round tower, grid ref: J3214 6506
- Drumboneth, Rath, grid ref: J2103 5230
- Drumboneth, Enclosure, grid ref: J1980 5203
- Drumena, Cairn with cist: Carnbane, grid ref: J3063 3358
- Drumena, Cashel, grid ref: J3089 3372
- Drumgath, Graveyard and site of medieval church, grid ref: J1672 2959
- Drumhirk, Rath, grid ref: J4586 6553
- Drummiller, Standing stone, grid ref: J0742 3117
- Drummiller, Motte, grid ref: J0833 3098
- Drummiller, World War II Pillbox, grid ref: J0705 4449
- Drumnahare, Standing stone, grid ref: J1105 4152
- Drumnahare, Loughbrickland Crannóg in Lough Brickland, grid ref: J1113 4118
- Drumnahare, Mound, grid ref: J1130 4197
- Drumreagh, Raised fort or motte: Curly’s Fort, grid ref: J4358 6019
- Drumsallagh, Monastic site, grid ref: J0935 4142
- Drumsallagh, Rath, grid ref: J0923 4054
- Dunbeg Upper, Fortification: Dunbeg Fort, grid ref: J3395 4872
- Dunbeg Upper, Rath, grid ref: J3473 4845
- Duneight, Motte and bailey (area surrounding the state care monument), grid ref: J2777 6078
- Duneight, Rath: Todd’s Grave, grid ref: J2797 6156
- Dunlady, Mound, grid ref: J4304 7420
- Dunmore, Church and graveyard: Templemoyle, grid ref: J3665 4703
- Dunmore, Neolithic house, grid ref: J3643 4607
- Dunnaman, Court tomb: Giant’s Grave, grid ref: J2885 1503
- Dunnanew, Counterscarp rath, grid ref: J4157 4257
- Dunnaval, Rath, grid ref: J2850 1293
- Dunover, Motte, grid ref: J6052 7032
- Dunturk, Rath, grid ref: J3593 4373

== E ==
- Edenagarry, Round cairn, grid ref: J1825 3779
- Edenderry, Motte, grid ref: J3181 6806
- Edenderry, Chimney (known as Edenderry bleach works), grid ref: J1209 9468
- Edenmore, Cashel, grid ref: J1453 2669
- Edenmore, Court tomb, grid ref: J1475 2583
- Edentrumly, Rath and souterrains: Lisbane, grid ref: J1677 2693
- Erenagh, Enclosure, grid ref: J4658 4083

== F ==
- Farranfad, Mound: Piper’s Fort, grid ref: J4337 4335
- Finnard, Rath, grid ref: J1390 3195
- Finnis, Souterrain, grid ref: J2740 4418
- Fish Quarter, Fish trap: Doctor’s Bay, grid ref: J5985 6206

== G ==
- Gargarry, Standing stone, grid ref: J2887 3791
- Glasdrumman, Windmill, flourmill and dwelling, grid ref: J4105 5946
- Glasdrumman, Court tomb and graveyard: Killygony Graveyard, grid ref: J3768 5436
- Glasdrumman, Cashel, grid ref: J3668 5487
- Glebe, Cross in Donaghmore churchyard, grid ref: J1045 3495
- Glenloughan, Standing stone: Cloghmore, grid ref: J0669 4452
- Glenloughan, Rath with annex, grid ref: J0743 4404
- Glenloughan, World War II Pillbox, grid ref: J0736 4436
- Goward Dolmen, Court tomb in Goward townland, grid ref: J2374 2964
- Gransha, Raised rath: Gransha Mound, grid ref: J5314 7694
- Gransha, Large hilltop enclosure, grid ref: J2516 4609
- Gransha, Tidal mill wall, grid ref: J5971 6054
- Greenan, Mound: Dumb Fort, grid ref: J1768 5357
- Greenan, Standings stones (3): Three Sisters, grid ref: J1015 4110
- Greenan, Graveyard and crosses ‘Clonlea’, grid ref: J1182 2219
- Greencastle, Motte, grid ref: J2429 1182
- Greencastle, Church, grid ref: J2453 1181
- Greengraves, Portal tomb: The Kempe Stones, grid ref: J4454 7363
- Greyabbey Bay, Intertidal archaeological landscape, grid ref: J568 670
- Growell, Crannog in Lough Aghery, grid ref: J2815 5336

== H ==
- Hillhall, Bawn (remains of), grid ref: J3012 6443

== I ==
- Imdel, Rath, grid ref: J1563 3734
- Inch, Monastic remains outside State Care area, grid ref: Area of J477 455
- Islandbane, Standing stone, grid ref: J4798 4003
- Islandmoyle, Standing stone (otherwise known as the Gray stone), grid ref: J2628 3507

== K ==
- Keentagh, Complex cairn: Millin Bay Cairn (area around the state care monument), grid ref: J6288 4949
- Kilbroney, Crosses (2), church and graveyard, grid ref: J1880 1954
- Kilbroney, Standing stones (2), grid refs: J1870 1936 and J1864 1911
- Kilclief, Motte, grid ref: J5979 4618
- Kilclief, Anglo-Norman coffin lids (2) (in Church of Ireland Church), grid ref: J5960 4569
- Kilkeel, Portal tomb: the Crawtree Stone, grid ref: J3075 1486
- Kilkeel, Rath, reused as medieval church and graveyard: Church of St Colman del Morne, grid ref: J3070 1456
- Killough, Harbour (Killough Harbour), grid ref: J5415 3633
- Killysavan, Dane's Cast linear earthwork, grid refs: J0691 to J0684 3918 and J0684 3918 to J0690 3848
- Kilmore, Multi-ditched enclosure, grid ref: J0855 6222
- Kilpike, Rath, grid ref: J1245 4843
- Kinghill, Rath and possible souterrain, grid ref: J2575 3278
- Kircubbin, Harbour (Kircubbin Harbour), grid ref: J5953 6310
- Kirkistown, Motte, grid ref: J6382 5753
- Kirkistown, 17th century windmill, grid ref: J6411 5784
- Knock, Motte: Shandon Park Motte (area surrounding the state care monument), grid ref: J3846 7277
- Knocknanarny, Large enclosure, grid ref: J0671 3443
- Knocknanarny, Platform rath, grid ref: J0744 3363
- Knocknanarny, Dane's Cast linear earthwork, grid ref: J0634 3471 to J0638 3437

== L ==
- Lagan Navigation, canal visible at several points in the following townlands:
  - Reach 1: Malone Lower, grid ref: J3397 7128 to J3407 7709
  - Reach 2: Malone Upper, grid ref: J3369 7018 to J3353 6969
  - Reach 3: Ballynavally, grid ref: J3309 6915 to J3257 6914
  - Reach 4: Malone Upper, grid ref: J3195 6759 to J3099 6687
  - Reach 5: Malone Upper, grid ref: J3068 6714 to J3055 6720
  - Reach 6: Ballyskeagh, grid ref: J3005 6784 to J2861 6658
  - Reach 7: Lambeg, Lisnatrude and Tullycross, grid ref: J2806 6636 to J2803 6466
  - Reach 9: Old Warren, grid ref: J2670 6336 to J2664 6333
  - Reach 10: Blaris, grid ref: J2600 6275 to J2594 6247
- Lapnagoppoge, Navigation pillar, grid ref: J5862 4705
- Lappoges, Court tomb: Giant’s Graves, grid ref: J2557 5277
- Legannany, Graveyard with cross-inscribed pillar stone, grid ref: J3033 4274
- Legananny Dolmen, Dolmen, grid ref: J2887 4339
- Lisboy, Raised rath, grid ref: J5144 4790
- Lisdalgan, Raised rath, grid ref: J3939 5980
- Lisnabrague, Standing stone, grid ref: J0716 4095
- Lisnabrague, Dane's Cast linear earthwork, grid ref: J0664 4104 to J0682 4062
- Lisnabreeny, Rath, grid ref: J3727 6946
- Lisnacree, Church site and graveyard: Tamlaght, grid ref: J2447 1461
- Lisnacroppan, Mound and enclosure: barrow, grid ref: J1924 3721
- Lisnagade, Rath: Lisnaweelan, grid ref: J0833 4426
- Lisnagade, Rath, grid ref: J0887 4347
- Lisnagade, Dane's Cast linear earthwork, grid ref: Area of J086 439
- Lisnaree and Ballydown, Rath, grid ref: J1484 4672
- Lisnatierny, Counterscarp rath, grid ref: J1056 3730
- Lisoid, Raised rath, grid ref: J5099 3674
- Listooder, Raths, grid refs: J4110 5320 and J4173 5299
- Loughadian, Dane's Cast linear earthwork, grid ref: J0702 4006 to J0694 3969
- Loughans, World War II Pillboxes, grid refs: J0524 2746 and J0531 4733
- Loughbrickland Crannóg in Lough Brickland, in Drumnahare townland, grid ref: J1113 4118
- Loughkeelan, Raised rath, grid ref: J5618 4558
- Loughmoney, Portal tomb: Loughmoney Dolmen, grid ref: J5391 4635

== M ==
- Magheradrool, Church, grid ref: J3792 5127
- Magheradrool, Rath, grid ref: J3829 4977
- Magheraknock, Hilltop enclosure: Magheraknock Fort, grid ref: J3444 5591
- Magheraknock, Rath, grid ref: J3471 5699
- Magheramayo, Rath and souterrain: Big Fort, grid ref: J2965 3800
- Magheramayo, Standing stone, grid ref: J2984 3841
- Magherana, Rath, grid ref: J1034 5467
- Magheratimpany, Rath, grid ref: J3749 4779
- Mahee Castle, Tower house and bawn (area adjacent to the State Care monument), in Mahee Island townland, grid ref: J5239 6393
- Mahee Island, Nendrum Monastery monastic site (area surrounding the State Care Monument), grid ref: J5245 6364
- Mahee Island, Tide mill, grid ref: J5255 6375
- Mahee Island, Landing place, grid ref: J524 639
- Margaret's Castle, Tower house in Ardglass, grid ref: J5603 3703
- Mayo, Standing stone: Long stone, grid ref: J1604 2662
- Mayo, Standing stone, grid ref: J1627 2524
- Mayo, Enclosure, grid ref: J1650 2525
- Maze, Hangars and World War II Pillbox, grid ref: J2241 6201
- Meenan, Counterscarp rath, grid ref: J0928 3967
- Millin Bay Cairn, Complex cairn (area around the state care monument), in Keentagh townland, grid ref: J6288 4949
- Milltown, Court tomb: Carnanbane, grid ref: J1325 2475
- Moneydorragh More, Standing stone: the Long Stone, grid ref: J3539 1991
- Moneyscalp, Cashel, grid ref: J3142 3441
- Moneyslane, Standing stones (2), grid ref: J2538 3998
- Monlough, Rath, grid ref: J3909 6514
- Mount Stewart, Motte: Moat Hill, grid ref: J5635 7013
- Moyad, Court tomb: Rush’s Cove, grid ref: J2878 1958
- Moygannon, Raths (2), grid refs: J1615 1991 and J1609 1981
- Mullaghmore, Ring barrows (2) and standing stones, grid ref: J1928 2722

== N ==
- Narrow Water, Motte, grid ref: J1291 1923
- Nendrum Monastery, Monastic site (area surrounding the State Care Monument), in Mahee Island townland, grid ref: J5245 6364
- Newry, Tower house: Bagnal's Castle, grid ref: J0873 2615
- Newry Canal, Canal visible at several points in the following townlands:
  - Reach 1 (a): Drumalane and Lisdrumliska, grid ref: J1091 2071 to J0848 2594
  - Reach 1 (b): Ballinlare, Lisdrumgullion and Lisdrumliska, grid ref: J0848 2594 to J0874 2743
  - Reach 2: Lisdrumgullion, grid ref: J0874 2743 to J0848 2806
  - Reach 3: Damolly, grid ref: J0848 2806 to J0773 2869
  - Reach 4: Carnbane and Lisdrumgullion, grid ref: J0773 2869 to J0749 2936
  - Reach 5: Carnmeen, grid ref: J0749 2936 to J0742 3087
  - Reach 6: Carnmeen and Drummiller, grid ref: J0742 3087 to J0676 3230
  - Reach 7: Knockanarny, grid ref: J0676 3230 to J0616 3433
  - Reach 8: Ballylough, Drumantine and Knockanarny, grid ref: J0616 3433 to J0648 3678
  - Reach 9: Aughantaraghan and Damoan, grid ref: J0648 3678 to J0675 3833
  - Reach 10: Loughadian, grid ref: J0675 3833 to J0613 to 3928
  - Reach 11: Glenloughan, Scarva, Lisnabrague and Loughadian, grid ref: J0613 3928 to J0638 4504
  - Reach 12: Terryhogan, grid ref: J0638 4504 to J0631 4536
  - Reach 13: Moyallan and Mullabrack, grid ref: J0631 4536 to J0314 5117
- Newtownards, 17th-century garden, walls and canal, grid ref: Area of J491 737
- Newtownards, Market Cross: Old Cross, grid ref: J4915 7403

== O ==
- Ogilby Island, Stone and wooden fish trap, grid ref: Area of J507 687
- Ouley, Church site, graveyard and enclosure, grid ref: J1450 3612

== Q ==
- Quarter Cormick, Standing stone, J4728 4236
- Queens Island, Thompson and Alexandra Graving Docks, grid ref: J3564 7601 and J3570 7627
- Queens Island, Hamilton Graving Dock, grid ref: J3012 6443
- Queens Island, Twin slipways of the RMS Titanic and RMS Olympic ships, grid ref: J3512 7543
- Queens Island, Travelling cranes and building dock: Samson and Goliath, grid ref: J3582 7547
- Quoile, Tower house: Quoile Castle, grid ref: J4963 4701

== R ==
- Raholp, Church and graveyard: St Tassach’s, Saul, grid ref: J5406 4788
- Raholp, Chambered tomb, grid ref: J5429 4719
- Rainey Island, Oyster midden, grid ref: J5270 6314
- Rathgorman, Motte and bailey, grid ref: J5278 5821
- Rathmullan, Raised rath and motte: Rathmullan Motte, grid ref: J4775 3736
- Rathmullan Lower, Barrow, grid ref: J4816 3743
- Ringbane, Rath, grid ref: J1235 3445
- Ringhaddy, Church: Ringhaddy Church (area surrounding the State Care monument), grid ref: J5381 5898
- Ringhaddy, Tower house: Ringhaddy Castle, J5384 5886
- Ringmackilroy, Windmill, grid ref: J1428 1822
- Ringneill, Stone fish trap, grid ref: J5180 6615
- Rosemount, Rath, grid ref: J5803 6766
- Rossconor (Rathfriland), Tower house, grid ref: J2013 3374
- Rossglass, Corbelled pig crews, grid ref: J5163 3510
- Rostrevor, 18th century style grotto, grid ref: J1748 1860
- Round Island, Structural complex, grid ref: J577 566

== S ==
- Saul, Ecclesiastical site: Saul Abbey, grid ref: J5097 4634
- Saul, Carved stone head, grid ref: J5076 4673
- Saval Beg, Standing stone, grid ref: J1205 3104
- Saval More, Standing stones (2), grid ref: J1216 3119
- Scarva, World War II Pillboxes (2), grid refs: J0645 4365 and J0719 4289
- Scarva, Bivallate rath, grid ref: J0744 4398
- Scarva, Dane's Cast linear earthwork, grid refs: J078 436 to J066 421, J074 433 to J078 436, J071 430 to J075 434 and J076 432 to J077 434
- Scrabo, Hut circles, grid ref: Area of J477 726
- Scrabo, Hillfort, grid ref: J4776 7260
- Seafin, Castle, grid ref: J2205 3880
- Seafin, Rath, grid ref: J2157 3786
- Sheepland Beg, Windmill stump, grid ref: J5764 3924
- Sheeptown, Motte and bailey: Crown Mound, grid ref: J1074 2791
- Shrigley Mill chimney, Chimney stack in Tullyveery townland, grid ref: J5203 5390
- Skeagh, Rath: Cromie’s Fort, grid ref: J2358 5018
- Slanes, Church, graveyard, souterrain and enclosure, grid ref: J6372 5517
- Slidderyford Dolmen, Portal tomb in Wateresk townland, grid ref: J3936 3437
- Slievenagriddle, Megalithic cist, grid ref: J5295 4535
- Strangford Lower, Tower: Old Court, grid ref: J5890 5002

== T ==
- Tamnaharry, Possible megalithic tomb and enclosure: Cloghadda, grid ref: J1542 2444
- Tara, Rath: Tara Fort, grid ref: J6267 4850
- Teconnaught, Rath, grid ref: J4321 4836
- Tollymore, Rath: St Cillan’s Fort, grid ref: J3680 3195
- Tollymore Park, Cashel: White Fort, grid ref: J3305 3178
- Tonaghmore, Rath, grid ref: J3932 5748
- Tonaghmore, Windmill stump, grid ref: J3841 5676
- Town Parks (Comber), Motte, grid ref: J4480 6843
- Tullyboard, Windmill stump: Portaferry, grid ref: J5995 5056
- Tullycarn, Rath, grid ref: J1509 5258
- Tullyear, Rath, grid ref: J1338 4489
- Tullyhinan, Raths, grid refs: J1614 4864 and J1500 4776
- Tullymacnous, Clay and Tullyveery, Crannog in the Clea Lakes, grid ref: J5099 5494
- Tullymurry, Motte and bailey, grid ref: J4352 4182
- Tullynakill, Harbour, grid ref: J5237 6348
- Tullyveery, Chimney stack, Shrigley Mill chimney, grid ref: J5203 5390
- Tullyveery, Tullymacnous and Clay, Crannog in the Clea Lakes, grid ref: J5099 5494

== W ==
- Walshestown, Tower house and bawn: Walshestown Castle, grid ref: J5452 4978
- Walshestown, Pier, grid ref: J5448 5012
- Wateresk, Portal tomb: Slidderyford Dolmen, grid ref: J3936 3437
- Whitespots, Lead mine: engine-house, shaft, chimney etc., grid ref: J4918 7689
- Whitespots, Lead mine: chimney of south engine-house, grid ref: J4925 7628
- Whitespots, Lead mine: windmill stump, grid ref: J4936 7647
- Whitespots, Lead mine: bog shaft, engine-house and ancillary structures including chimney and outbuildings, grid ref: J4930 7592
- Woodgrange, Rath and tower house (area surrounding the state care monument, grid ref: J4446 4648
