= Mahee =

Mahee may refer to:

- Mahee Island, Northern Ireland, the location of the Nendrum Monastery
  - Mahee Castle, on Mahee Island
- Mahee Ferdhaus (born 1973), British businessman
- Mahée Paiement (born 1976), French-Canadian actress
