= Ballynoe stone circle =

Neolothic monument in Ireland

Ballynoe Stone Circle
- Ciorcal Cloch Bhaile Nua (Irish)
- Location in County Down, Northern Ireland
- 54.290937°N 5.726292°W
- Type: Stone circle
- Periods: Neolithic / Bronze Age
- Cultures: Celtic
- Location: County Down, Northern Ireland
- OS grid reference: J481404

History
- Built: c. 3000 BC

Site notes
- Material: Stone
- Height: 1.8 m (5 ft 11 in)
- Diameter: c. 35 meters
- Excavation dates: 1937-1938
- Archaeologists: Albert Giffen and Mary Gaffikin
- Public access: Open

Ballynoe Stone Circle is a complex multi-phase site, meaning its use spans multiple periods of human history. It is believed to be some 5,000 years old dating from the late Neolithic (around 3000 BC) into the Early Bronze Age (itself two millennia from 2500 – 500 BC). The stone circle located near the village of Ballynoe, County Down in Northern Ireland is one of around 1,300 recorded stone circles in Ireland, Britain and Brittany remaining today....

== History ==
Stone circles are circular arrangements of standing stones, dating from the late Neolithic era through the Early Bronze Age. Monuments were constructed from 3300 to 900 BCE. They are commonly found throughout Britain, Ireland, and Brittany. In Ireland, the monuments are distributed primarily in County Cork, County Kerry, and in central Ulster. Circular sites are not a unique feature of the prehistoric; henges, passage tombs, stone circles, cairns, exhumation sites like the Giant's Ring at Ballynahatty, County Down and the cairn at Millin Bay near Portaferry, County Down. All are circular arrangements of stones that can vary in size from some small boulders to great orthostats. In Ulster, the typical stone circle is constructed of a large number of small stones, usually 0.3 m high, and are often found at higher elevations. Stone circles are relative scarce in County Down, compared to other regions of Ulster. There are more than 1,300 surviving stone circles in Britain, Ireland, and Brittany today.

== Description ==
The Ballynoe stone circle is located near the village of Ballynoe, County Down, in Northern Ireland. The circle measures around 35 m (115 ft) in diameter and includes 50 or more small, upright stones, with a maximum height of 1.8 m (5 ft 11 in). It is thought there were originally more – Aubrey Burl estimating 70 or so and it is likely the full complement would have stood shoulder to shoulder as at Grange stone circle near Lough Gur and a comparator site of Swinside in Cumbria (which is built on approximately the same latitude as Ballynoe).

The site, especially its phasing, is still not really understood. For example, the mound was most likely added in a later building phase. A ditch may have surrounded it originally, with a pair of stones outside the western edge perhaps marking an entrance point which has been recorded as being aligned with the Spring Equinox (the midpoint between the Winter and Summer Solstices) on 21 March of each year. Inside the circle is a long low partly kerbed mound lying east–west. The mound has similar (two end burial chambers) features to the Audleystown Court Tomb. Three pairs of stones are positioned outside the circle, and four stones on the western edge of the circle form an entrance, 2.1 m (6 ft 11 in) wide to the circle.

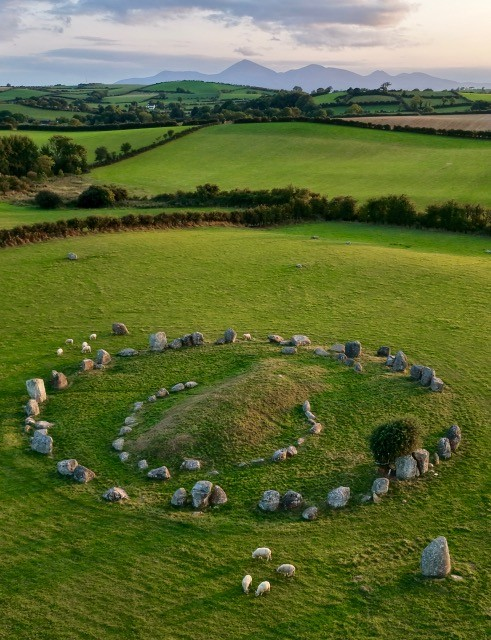
Ballynoe aerial image taken looking roughly south towards the Mourne Mountains

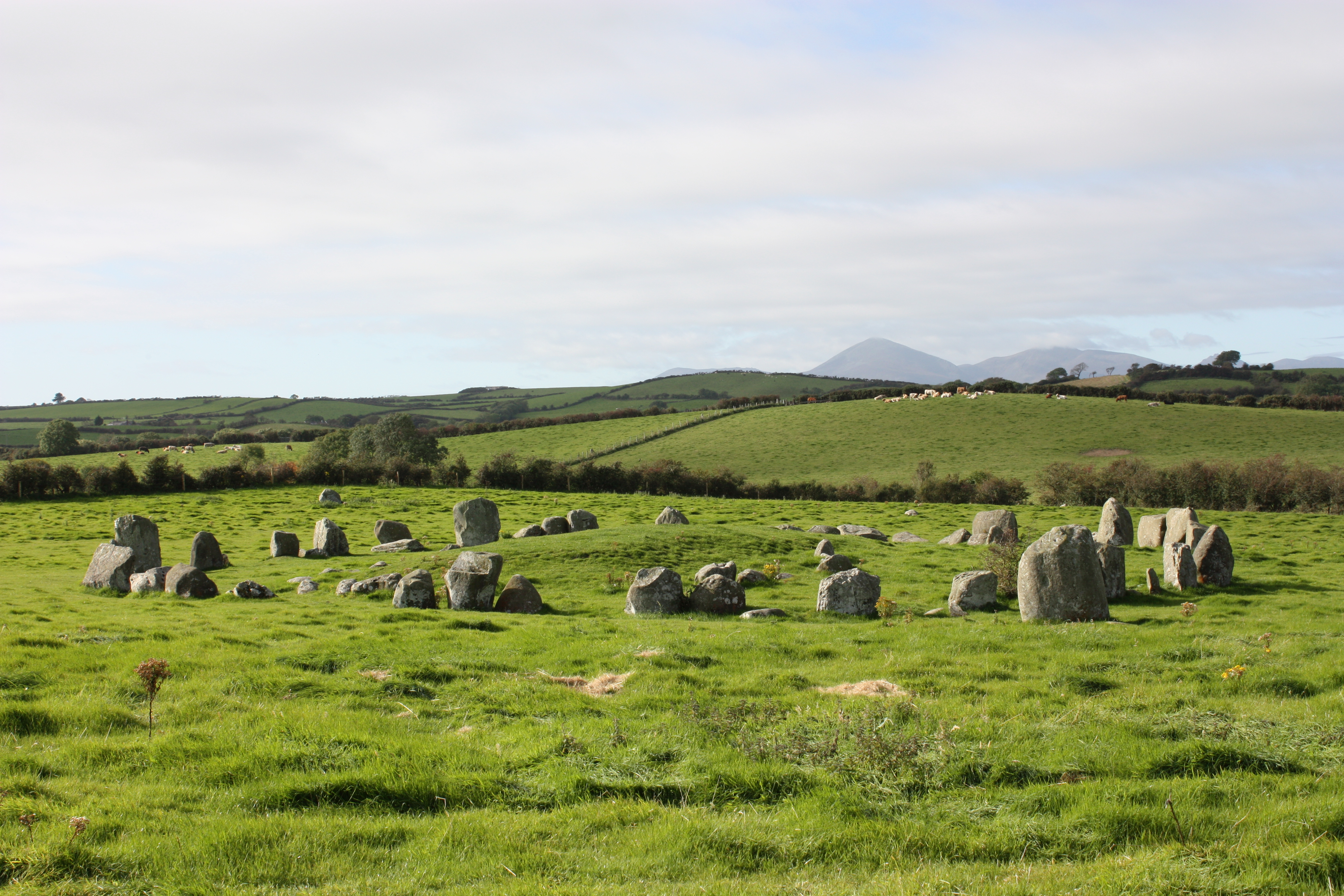
Ballynoe stone circle

== Excavation ==
The excavation was conducted between 20 - 27 September 1937 and 7 - 16 June 1938 by Professor Albert Giffen, a Dutch archaeologist, and Miss Mary McMurray Gaffikin, an archaeology expert from Newcastle, County Down. Although this was a thorough investigation, Professor Giffen was prevented by World War 2 from completing his work and publishing his results. An illustrated report on the work by W. Groenman-van Waateringe. J. J. Butler and B. K. S. Dijkstra has since been published.

The excavation uncovered a partially curbed long cairn 21 metres in length by 9 metres wide within the stone circle. There were cists at both the east and west ends with the west end later augmented with two more chambers. Gabriel Cooney suggests that it may originally have been a long cairn in the court tomb tradition (like Audleystown), with a kerbed round mound in the passage tomb tradition added later. Waddell believed that the cup marked stones and presence of Carrowkeel Ware connects the site to passage tombs like those at Carrowkeel Megalithic Cemetery. There were also water-smoothed sacred stones called baetyls recovered from the cists which is similar to another excavated site at Millin Bay, also an oval mound covering a long stone-built grave site.

The inner mound originally held two burial cists with cremated human remains, one at each end of the mound. The bones are believed to be taken from seven people, including a young child, and were removed during the excavation. They were stored in the basement of the Groningen Institute of Archaeology where they lay for 90 years until 2023 when Lisa White, a PhD researcher at Queen's University, who had been trying to track down the bones in the hope of including them as part of her thesis contacted Dr Anna Moles, who is an assistant professor of Human Osteoarchaeology at the University of Groningen in the Netherlands. Dr Moles took them to Queen's University, where they were received by Lisa and Professor Eileen Murphy at the Department of Archaeology and Palaeoecology.

== Mythology ==
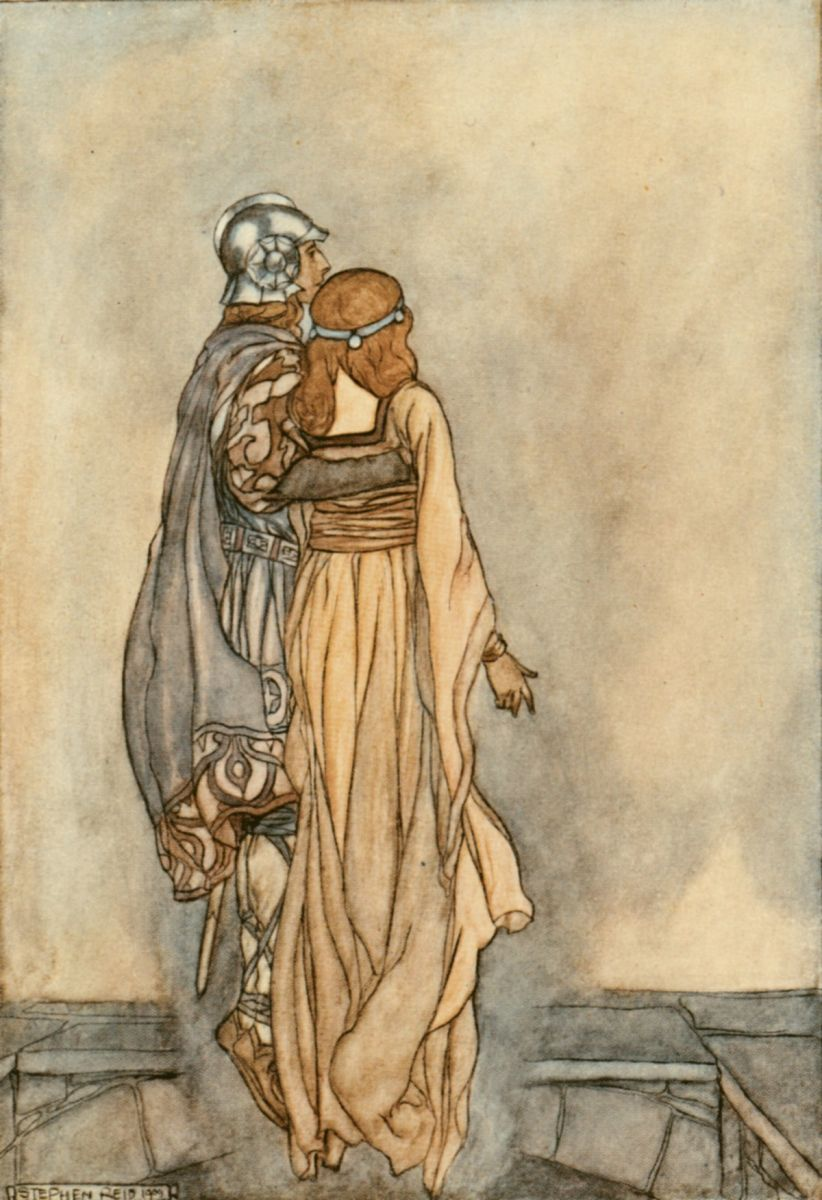
Étaín and Midir, illustration by Stephen Reid in T. W. Rolleston's The High Deeds of Finn (1910)

Tochmarc Étaíne "The Wooing of Étaín" is an Irish mythological tale about the love story between Étaín and Midir, filled with transformations, trials, and eventual reunions despite the jealousy and interference of Midir's first wife, Fúamnach.

Midir, a member of the Tuatha Dé Danann, falls in love with Étaín, but Fúamnach becomes jealous and casts spells on Étaín, who turns her into water, a worm, and finally a fly. Despite these transformations, Midir remains devoted to Étaín, and their love story continues through many trials and transformations until they are finally reunited.

Ailill Angubae, king of the Ulaid and brother of High King Eochaid Airem, falls deeply in love with Étaín and begins to waste away due to his unrequited love. Étaín agrees to meet him to save his life, but Midir intervenes by casting a spell that causes Ailill to fall asleep, preventing their meeting and revealing the depth of Midir's connection to Étaín. Ailill lives in Mag nInis (now known as Lecale) and is likely identified as Ballynoe.

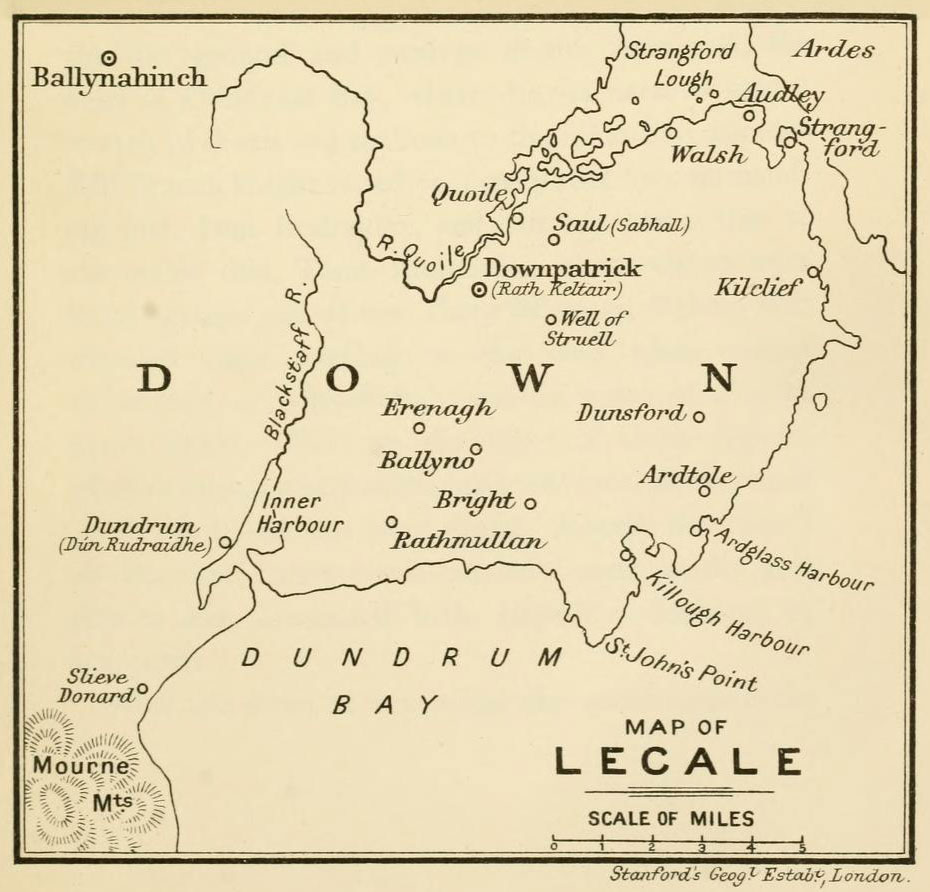
Historic map of Lecale by Alice Stopford Green (1912)

This site is mentioned alongside significant landmarks such as Emain Macha (Navan Fort) and Tara (Hill of Tara). These references highlight the importance of Ballynoe in ancient Irish lore, connecting it to other prominent mythological sites.

== Purpose ==
The original purpose for stone circles in unknown, but many archaeologists believe that they were used for multiple purposes, including burials, religious or ceremonial purposes, and community gatherings. It has also been suggested that the stones were situated in relation to meaningful solar and lunar alignments.

== Gallery ==
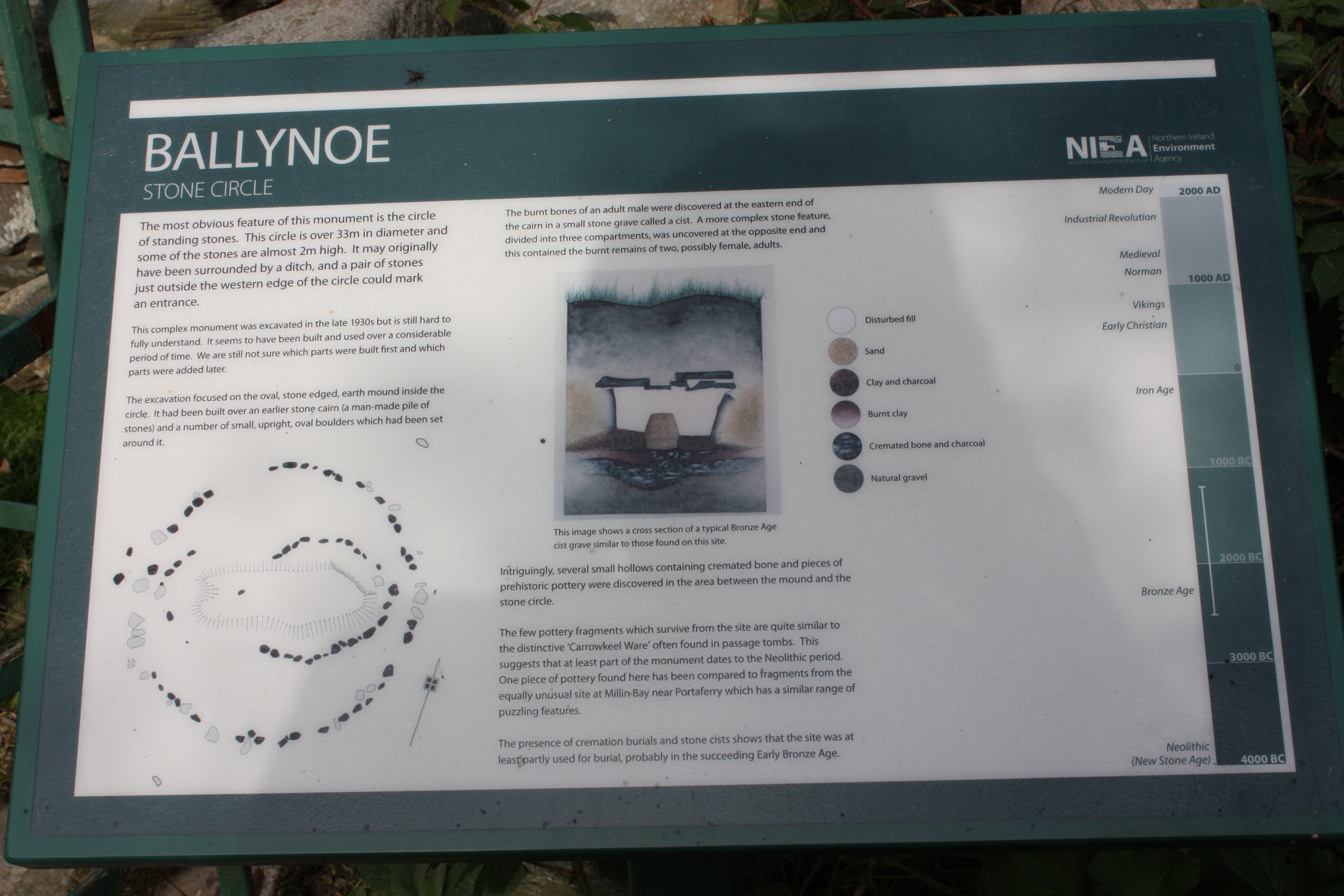
Information board at Ballynoe stone circle (2009)

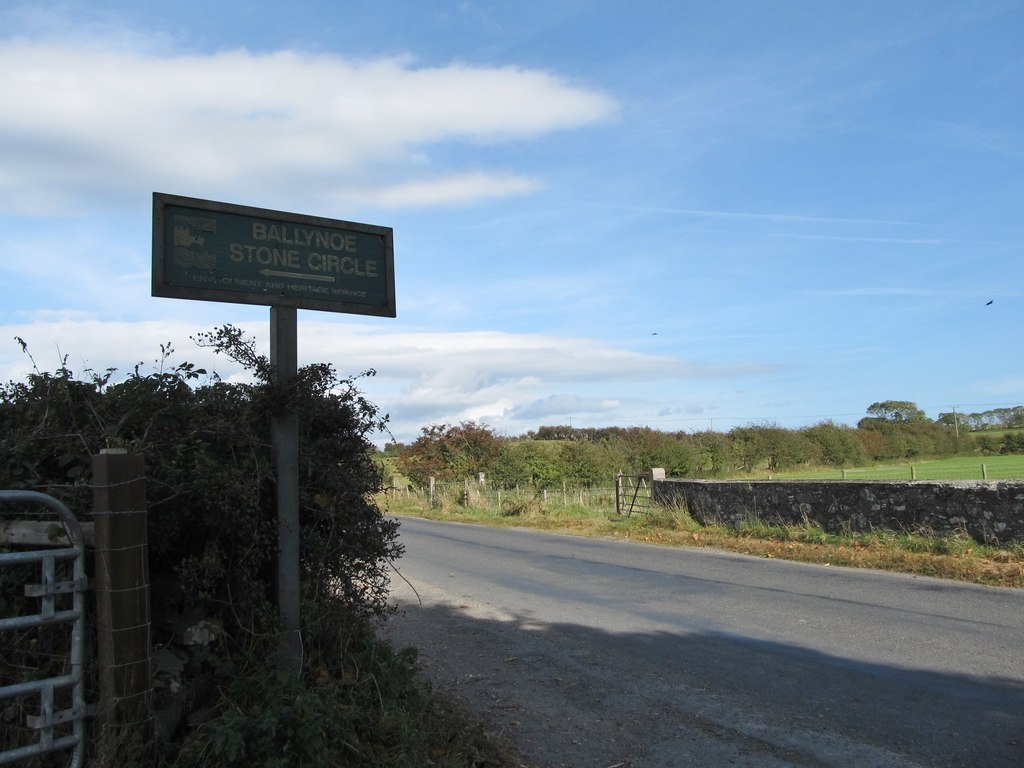
Ballynoe Road at the entrance to the path leading to the Stone Circle (2014)

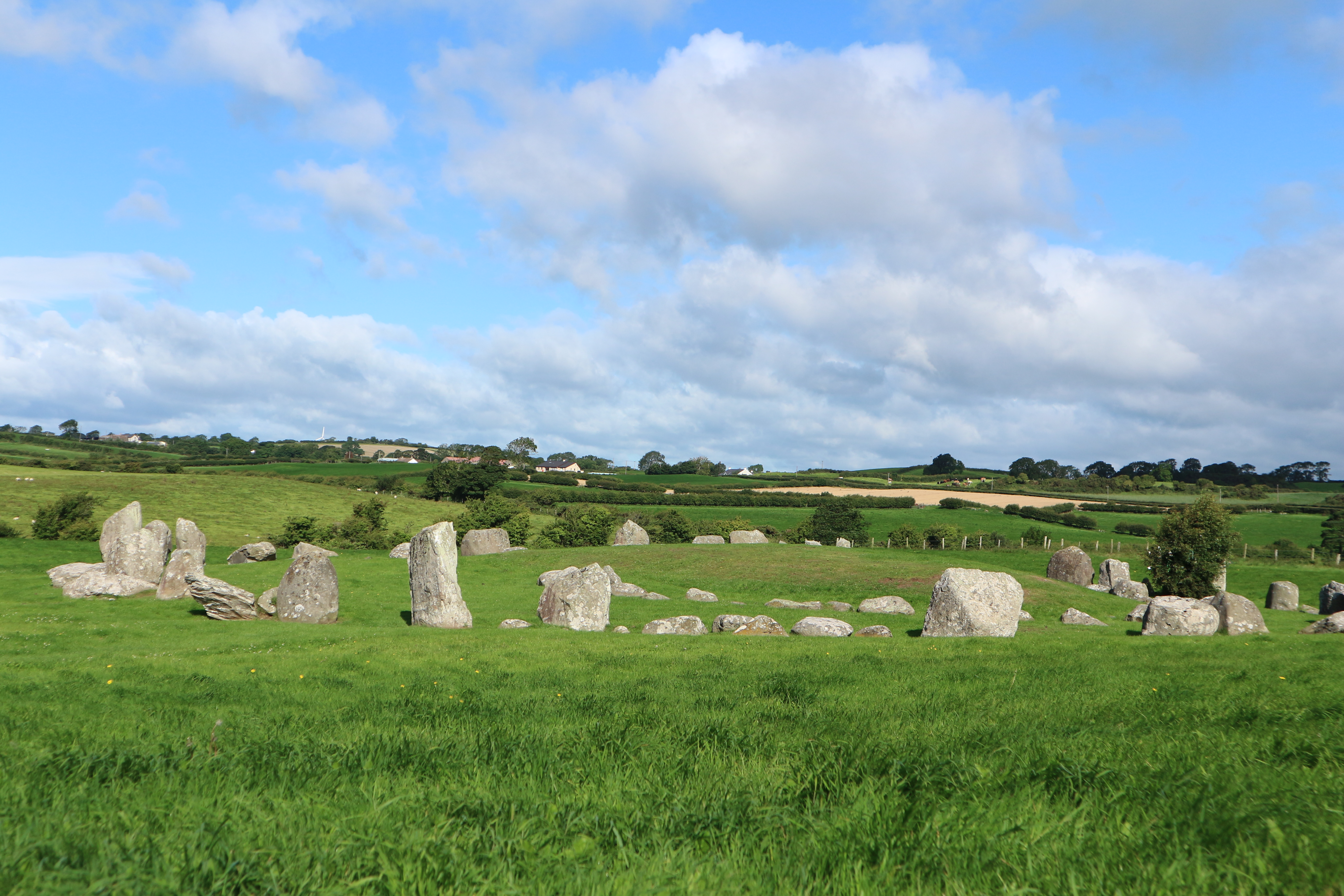
Ballynoe Stone Circle (2020)

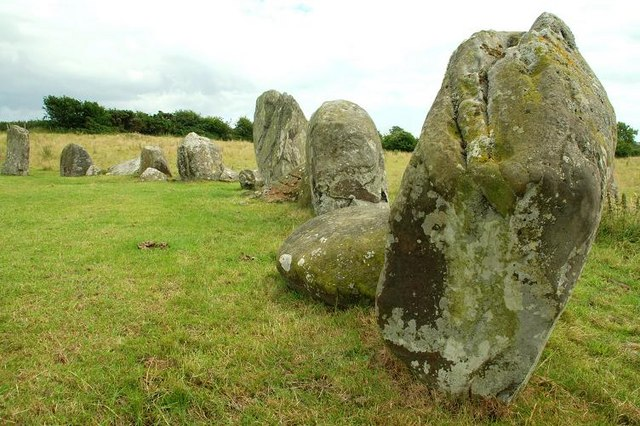
Some of the larger stones (2008)

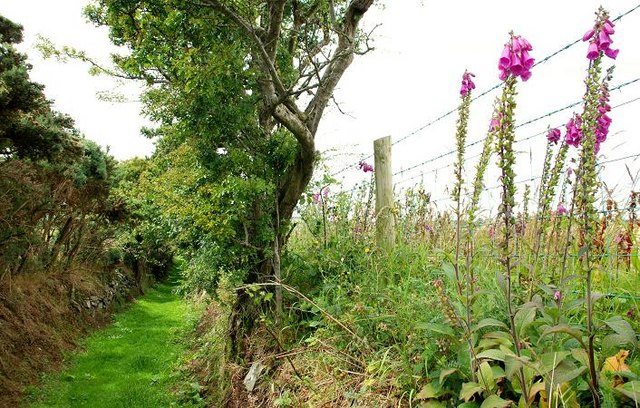
Public lane to Ballynoe Stone Circle (2008)

== See also ==
- Callanish Stones
- Prehistoric Ireland
- List of archaeological sites in County Down
- List of megalithic monuments in Ireland
