= Hilltown, County Down =

Village in County Down, Northern Ireland

Coordinates: 54.1944°N 6.1450°W

Hilltown: Irish: Baile Hill
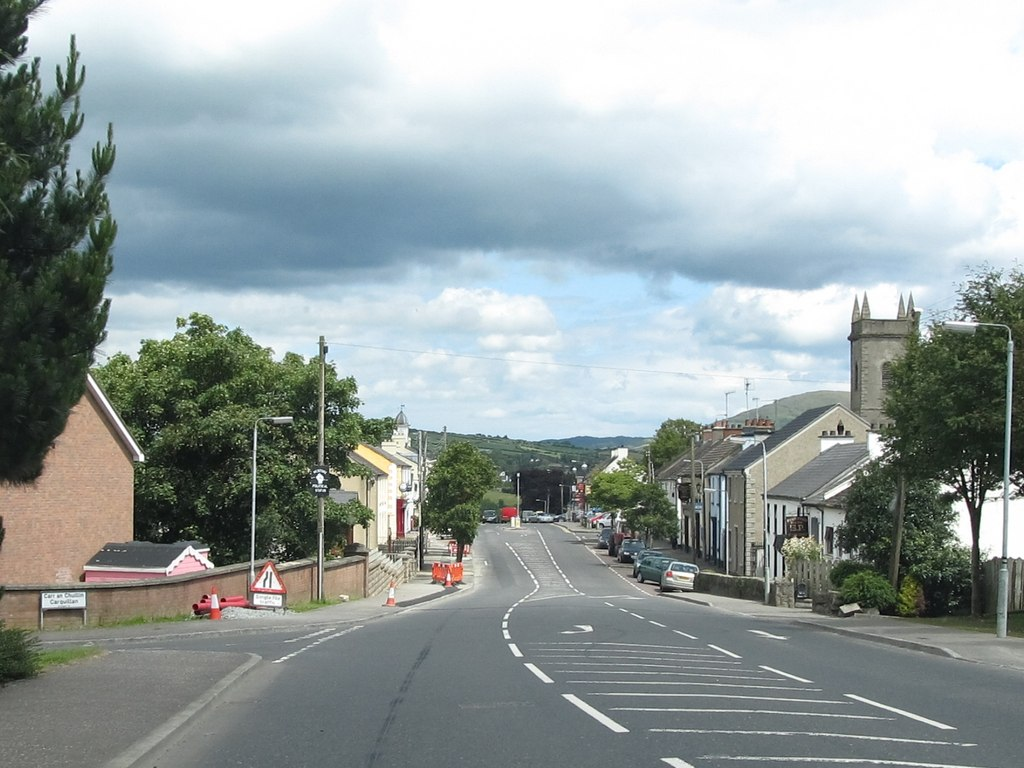
- Main Street

- Location within County Down
- Population: 1,709 (2011 Census)
- District: Newry, Mourne and Down
- County: County Down
- Country: Northern Ireland
- Sovereign state: United Kingdom
- Post town: NEWRY
- Postcode district: BT34
- Dialling code: 028
- NI Assembly: South Down

Hilltown (Irish: Baile Hill) is a small village within the townland of Carcullion in County Down, Northern Ireland. Hilltown is the main village of the parish of Clonduff which contains the village and the rural areas around it at one end, and the rural enclave of Cabra at the other end of the parish. The parish of Clonduff is situated in the barony of Iveagh Upper, Lower Half. It had a population of 899 people in the 2001 census. On 27 March 2011, the usually resident population of Hilltown was 1,709.

== History ==
Hilltown sprang up within the townland of Carcullion, which likely comes from Irish Carr an Chuilinn, 'rugged place of the holly'.

The village is situated in Iveagh which was the original Gaelic Irish territory of the Magennises (Irish: Mac Aonghusa) who were chiefs of Iveagh from the 12th century.

It was known in earlier times as The Eight Mile Bridge after the nearby bridge of the same name.

Count Redmond O’Hanlon, an outlawed member of Gaelic nobility, a tóraidhe and rapparee, was killed near The Eight Mile Bridge, in 1681.

The village was named after the Hill family; English politicians who also gave their name to nearby Hillhall and Hillsborough. The Hills founded the village in 1766 so that people living in the area could find employment in the linen industry.

In early 1853 the constable in charge of the local Royal Irish Constabulary station, A Dunlop, exchanged posts with the constable in Rostrevor, A Morton. Morton remained in charge of the Hilltown station until after 1869.

Despite it early history, Hilltown is a strong Irish nationalist/republican village. During the Troubles, it had a small paramilitary presence, mainly through the Provisional Irish Republican Army. Irish culture is very important and prominent in the village and surrounding area that comprises the Clonduff parish. The local Gaelic Athletic Association club, Clonduff plays a major role in the community.

== Demography ==
=== 2001 census ===
On Census Day (29 April 2001) there were 899 people living in Hilltown. Of these:

- 27.0% were aged under 16 years and 14.4% were aged 60 and over;
- 48.8% of the population were male and 51.2% were female;
- 96.9% were from a Roman Catholic background and 2.8% were from a Protestant background; and
- 5.1% of people aged 16–74 were unemployed.

=== 2011 census ===
On Census Day (27 March 2011) the usually resident population of Hilltown Settlement was 1,709 accounting for 0.09% of the NI total. In Hilltown Settlement, considering the resident population:

- 99.94% were from the white (including Irish Traveller) ethnic group;
- 93.56% belong to or were brought up in the Catholic religion and 4.86% belong to or were brought up in a 'Protestant and Other Christian (including Christian related)' religion;
- 11.76% indicated that they had a British national identity, 57.40% had an Irish national identity and 32.24% had a Northern Irish national identity;
- 21.85% had some knowledge of Irish;
- 2.04% had some knowledge of Ulster-Scots; and
- 0.96% did not have English as their first language.

== Places of interest ==
- The Eight Mile Bridge is a three arch stone bridge situated on the outskirts of the village, to the east of Hilltown, and spans the upper Bann river. It carries the B8 road from Newcastle/ Castlewellan to Newry. Its name derives from the bridge being eight Irish miles from Newry.
- Goward Dolmen is a megalithic monument two miles from Hilltown on the road to Castlewellan in Cabra. It is also called Pat Kearney's Big Stone or Cloughmore Cromlech. The huge granite capstone has slipped from its original horizontal position.
- The St Johns Church of Ireland is situated in the centre of the village. It was built by The Marquess of Downshire in the 18th century.

== Education ==
- St. Patrick's Primary School, Hilltown – a large primary school with over 320 pupils, most of whose leavers further their education in Newry, Castlewellan or Warrenpoint.
- St. Paul's Primary School, Cabra – a smaller school located in Cabra which is part of the Clonduff parish, most leavers attend schools in Newry, Castlewellan or Warrenpoint.

== Sports ==
Clonduff GAC (Chluain Daimh CLG) is the local Gaelic Club in the area. It accommodates 23 teams in all sports ranging from Gaelic football, Ladies Gaelic football, hurling, camogie and handball. The club takes part in Scór and Scór na nÓg events. It is the only club in the county to have teams competing in all 5 codes of the GAA.

== See also ==
- List of towns and villages in Northern Ireland
- Market houses in Northern Ireland
