= Ballyorgan, County Down =

Townland in County Down, Northern Ireland

Ballyorgan Baile Uí Argáin
- Village
- Location in Ireland
- Coordinates: 54.59°N 5.77737°W
- Country: United Kingdom
- Province: Northern Ireland
- County: County Down

Ballyorgan (Irish: Baile Uí Argáin in Irish), is a townland in the barony of Lecale Lower in County Down, Northern Ireland.

== History ==
A church called Chapel na Coole once stood in the townland of Ballyorgan, which had, in 1615, been under the ownership of Bangor Abbey. In 1605, at the time of the dissolution of the monasteries, the church at Ballyorgan (in Lecale), was then called Ballilughan or Ballyurkegan. It belonged to Bangor Abbey, under the abbot William O’Dornan. The churches of the Abbey and related tithes and alterages were seized along with the Abbey. The chapel at Ballyorgan had also been called Baliurgan, and the townland in which it stood had also been known as Ballyurcegan, Ballyverdgan, and Balleurcegan. Reeves, in 1847, also referred to Ballyorgan as Baliurgan, Ballyurcegan, Ballelughan, and Balleurkegan in Lecaile and noted that the rectory at that site had been held by Henry Leslie in 1693, but that it was in ruins at the time of writing, apart from the west gable. It was known as Cappel na Coole. O’Laverty notes that the tithes of Ballyurcegan were valued at 53 shillings and 4 pence, due to Bangor Abbey, and that Baliurgan chapel was valued at 2 markes in the Taxation of Pope Nicholas Taxatio Ecclesiastica.

== See also ==
- List of archaeological sites in County Down
- List of windmills in County Down
- List of townlands of County Down
