= Ballydown, County Down =

Coordinates: 54°20′32″N 6°14′43″W

Ballydown, County Down: Irish: Baile an Dúin
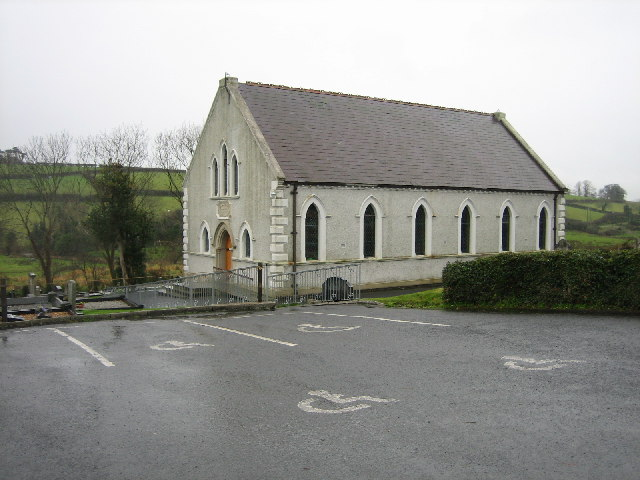
- Ballydown Presbyterian Church in 2005

- Location within County Down
- County: County Down
- Country: Northern Ireland
- Sovereign state: United Kingdom
- Postcode district: BT32
- Dialling code: 028

Ballydown (from Irish Baile an Dúin, meaning 'townland of the hill-fort') is a townland of 529 acres in County Down, Northern Ireland. It is situated in the civil parish of Seapatrick and the historic barony of Iveagh Upper, Lower Half.

== Archaeology ==
The townland contains a rath (at grid ref: J1484 4672) which is a Scheduled Historic Monument and is also partly in the townland of Lisnaree.

== See also ==
- List of townlands in County Down
