= Lisnagade =

Ringfort in County Down, Northern Ireland

Coordinates: 54.333°N 6.331°W

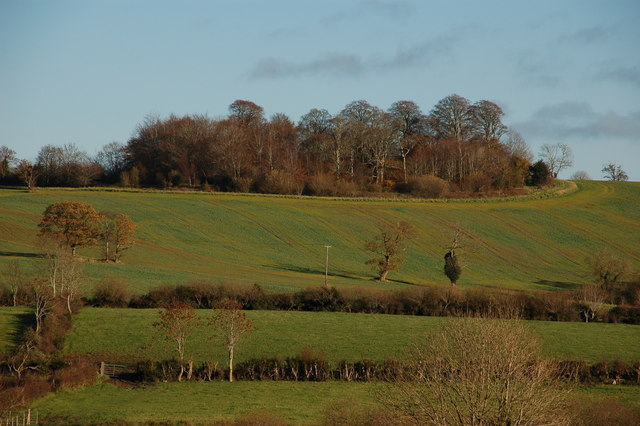
Lisnagade

Lisnagade (from Irish Lios na gCéad 'ringfort of the hundred') is a large multivallate earthen ringfort, three miles west of Banbridge, County Down, Northern Ireland, United Kingdom, just off the Scarva road. Lisnagade Fort rath and annex are State Care Historic Monuments in the townland of Lisnagade, in Banbridge District.

== Features ==
Lisnagade is an impressive circular earthwork, consisting of three massive ditch-separated banks, approximately 6m high, which completely surround the fort. The diameter of the inner circle is a good 60m and the total diameter of the rath is about 110m. There is a smaller rath annexed to the north by two straight ditches. This rath is very low and is about 30m diameter. It is surrounded by a single ditch.

Though bronze artefacts have been recovered from the site, little is known about its occupants. This ancient site dates back more than 1000 years, and is thought to have been constructed around 350 AD. The interior has now only low undergrowth and a beech tree just off centre. The banks are planted with a variety of well established trees as well as small bushes.

== History ==
According to the description of Scarva from Lewis's Topographical Dictionary of Ireland, 1837,

" Lisnagade, or "the fort of a hundred," is one of the most extensive and best-preserved of its kind: it consists of treble ramparts and intrenchments; the entrance is from the east, leading into an extensive circular enclosure, whence are obtained prospects of the entire country for many miles around, and a great number of forts or raths are seen, from which circumstance it is supposed this fort took its name, being the chief or centre of a hundred others: the fosses on every side are very deep, and it is remarkable that they are all paved at the bottom with rounded pebbles set in clay. In cleaning the fosses, in 1832, Mr. Trevor found a great many silver coins, a brass cauldron, spear-heads, and other relics of antiquity. Great numbers of arrow and spear-heads of flint, stone and brass celts, and other military weapons, have been found in almost every part of the "Cast." In 1807 the head and antlers of an enormous elk were found, which are carefully preserved at Scarvagh House: several others were found in the bog marl near Union Lodge; and in draining Loughadian, part of a tiara of gold, brazen swords, skeans, and spear-heads, were discovered, all of which are in the possession of W. Fivey, Esq., of Union Lodge. The greater portion of the ancient castle or tower yet exists at Pointz Pass; some fragments of that at Scarvagh are still seen above the village, and in the centre of Lisnagade fort are the remains of another of the same kind; the floor was discovered entire in 1832, constructed of baked tiles."

also,

"In 1783 a battle was fought at Lisnagade fort, between the "Hearts of Steel," and the "Break-of-day Boys," when several of the former were killed."

Also, on the morning of 13 July 1789 a group of Loughbrickland Protestants clashed with Catholics at Lisnagade, on their way to a commemoration of the Battle of Aughrim at Gilford. This became notorious as the `Lisnagade Riot'. Twelve Catholics were initially arrested, but later freed and magistrates refused warrants for the searching of Lisnagade homes for arms. Inevitably trouble continued and Lisnagade Mass House was burned to the ground the following summer (1790). A group of Loughgall Yeomanry known as 'Clarke's Wreckers' were blamed for the attack and contemporary accounts claim that it took place during a Mass which was being celebrated by the parish priest Fr. John Malone. The present St. Mary's Church was built as a replacement, at the behest of Fr. Malone, a couple of years later.

More recent writings suggest that some excavation was done in 1950. A small circular rath to the north was excavated in 1953.
