= Townpark =

Type of small farm defined in historical land use in Ireland

In the history of land use in Ireland, a townpark or town park was a smallholding near a town and farmed by someone resident in the town. Typically, a major landowner provided a contiguous area near the town which was subdivided into multiple townparks, each rented on a short-term lease, for a higher rent than that paid by a full-time resident farmer.

== Townlands ==
The Boundary Survey of 1825–1844, associated with Griffith's Valuation and the Ordnance Survey of Ireland, set down the names and denominations of subdivisions of land. Griffith often erected a contiguous block of townparks into a single townland named "Town Parks" or "Town Parks of [name of town]". The 1901 townland index recorded such townlands by the following towns: Ballycastle, Larne, Ballymena, Antrim, Ballymoney, Ballyhaise, Cavan, Cloyne, Midleton, Lifford, Ballyshannon, Newtownards, Skerries (Holmpatrick civil parish), Swords, Ballinasloe, Galway, Portumna, Castledermot, Athy, Birr, Daingean (then Philipstown), Carrick on Shannon, Longford, Newtown Forbes, Ardee, Dundalk, Navan, Athboy, Kells, Borris-in-Ossory, Mountmellick, Roscrea, Carrick-on-Suir, Cahir, Lismore, Delvin, Wexford, Lismore, Tallow, Tuam, Donaghadee, and Killeshandra. There were also "Town Fields" (Borrisokane), "Town Lands" (Clonakilty), "Town Lot" (Tipperary), "Town Lots" (Bantry), and "Townplots" (Kinsale and Killala). Town Parks was also the townland containing the centre of Belfast; it is listed in the 1861 index, but was entirely within the county borough boundary by 1901. Thurles Townparks is the townland, now almost entirely urbanised, around the historic centre of Thurles.

== Land Acts ==
The Landlord and Tenant (Ireland) Act 1870 and the Land Law (Ireland) Act 1881, which were designed to enable tenant farmers to purchase their holdings from landlords, specifically excluded townparks from their terms. This led to case law interpreting the Acts' definition of "townpark", which had three components:

1. That they adjoin or are near a city or town;
2. That they bear an increased value as accommodation land beyond their ordinary letting value for merely farming purposes
3. That they are occupied by a person living in a city or town or its suburbs

A "town" need not be a municipality with town commissioners or other government, and conversely a place within the municipal boundary might yet be too far from the built-up area to be considered a townpark. Population was suggestive but not definitive: Portglenone with 800 people was held not to be a "town", whereas Timoleague was, with only 366.

== See also ==
- Allotment (gardening)

== Sources ==
- Cherry, Richard R.; Wakely, John (1903). The Irish land law and land purchase acts, 1860 to 1901 : (including the congested districts board acts) : together with the rules and forms issued thereunder (3rd ed.). Dublin: John Falconer. pp. 355–360.
