= Goward Dolmen =

Dolmen in Northern Ireland

Coordinates: 54°12′47″N 6°05′40″W

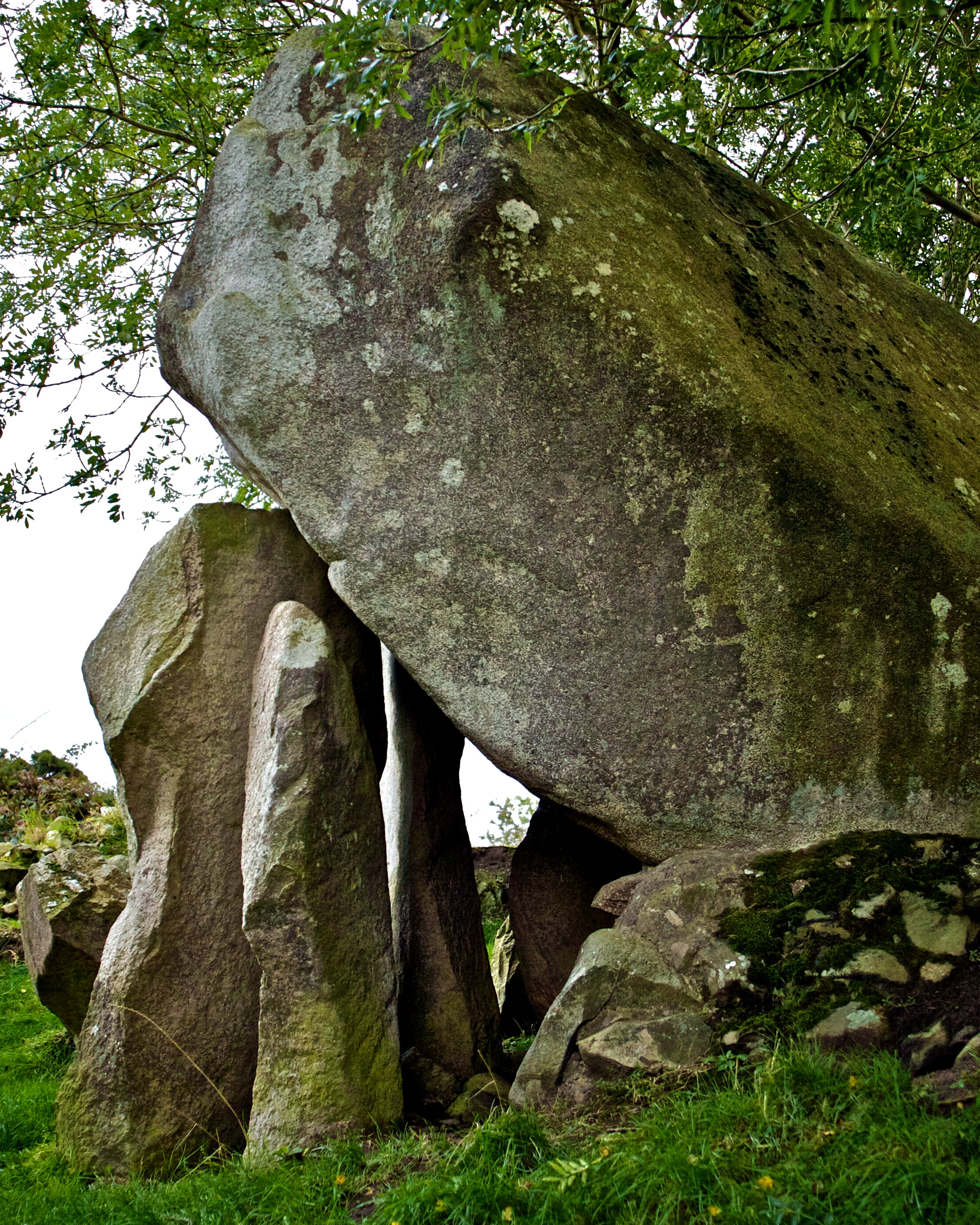
Goward Dolmen, September 2010

Goward Dolmen is a megalithic dolmen or cromlech situated between Hilltown and Castlewellan in County Down, Northern Ireland, two miles from Hilltown. It is in a farmer's field in the townland of Goward, in the parish of Clonduff. It is known locally as Pat Kearney's Big Stone or Cloughmore Cromlech. The huge granite capstone has slipped from its original horizontal position. The cap stone measures 13ft X 10ft with 5ft thickness and is supported by pillar stones nearly 6ft tall. Excavations in the 1830s produced a cremation urn and a flint arrowhead.

Goward Dolmen portal tomb is a State Care Historic Monument in the townland of Goward, in the Newry and Mourne District Council area, at grid ref: J2437 3104.
