= Keentagh =

Townland in County Down, Northern Ireland

Coordinates: 54°21′58″N 5°29′49″W

Keentagh: Irish: An Caointeach ‘fair house’
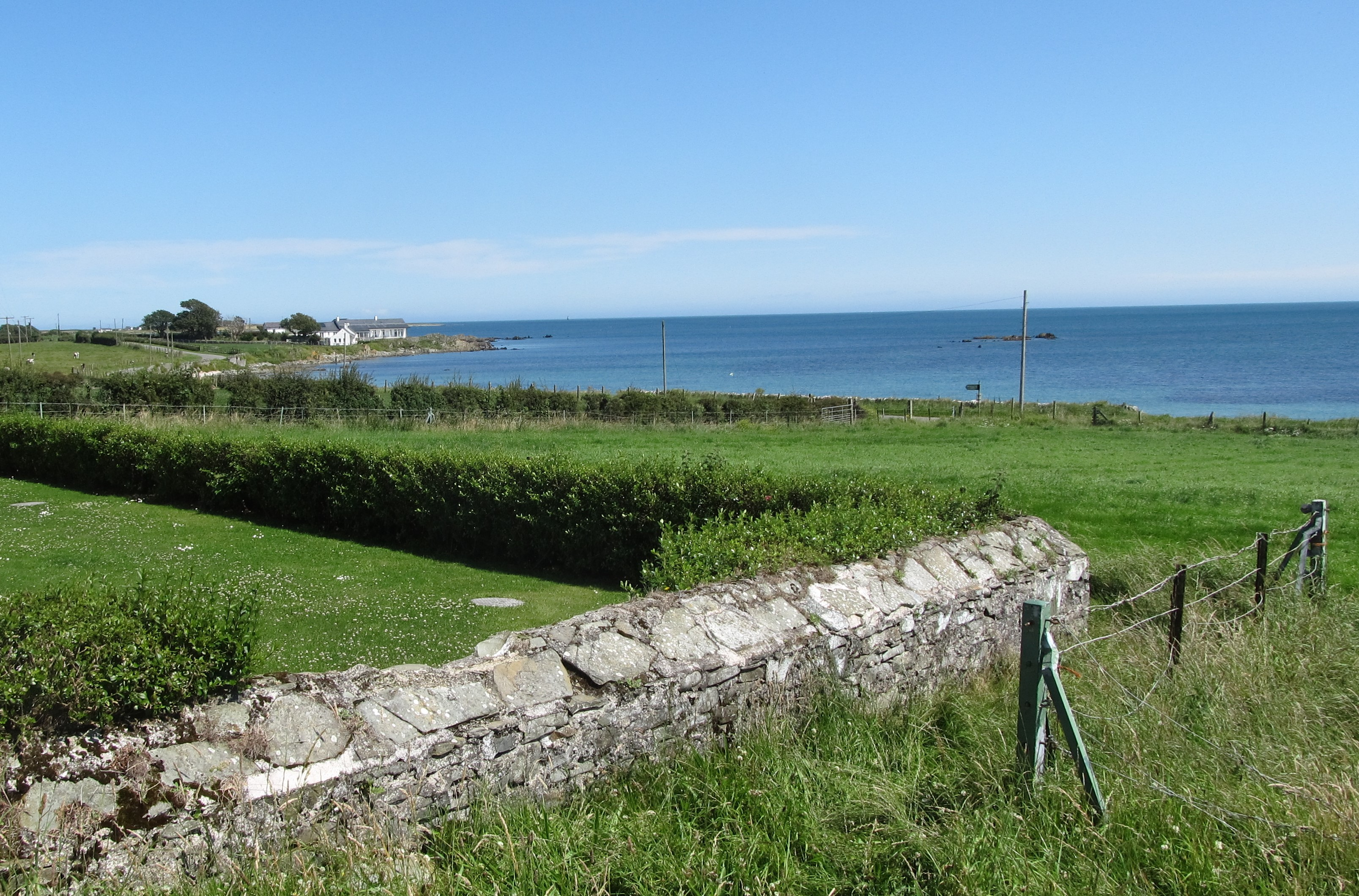
- Path leading to the road from the Millin Bay Cairn

- Location within Northern Ireland Location within County Down Keentagh (County Down)
- Irish grid reference: J6294349455
- District: Newry, Mourne and Down
- County: County Down
- Country: Northern Ireland
- Sovereign state: United Kingdom
- Post town: DOWNPATRICK
- Postcode district: BT22 1RQ
- Dialling code: 028
- UK Parliament: South Down
- NI Assembly: South Down

Keentagh, possibly derived from An Caointeach in Irish, is a small townland in County Down, Northern Ireland. The townland, which was originally part of the parish of Witter, is now part of the Quintin Electoral Division within the civil parish of Ballyphilip and the historical barony of Ards Upper. It is located 4km south east of Portaferry and covers an area of approximately 61.25 hectares (151.34 acres)

== Archaeology ==
=== Millin Bay Cairn ===
Archaeological evidence indicates human activity in the region dating back to the Neolithic period. The Millin Bay Cairn, a megalithic tomb, is a complex late Neolithic burial monument constructed between 3000 and 2000 BC. It appears now as a low, oval grassy mound aligned north-south, with a surrounding oval stone setting.

The cairn contains a long stone cist, a burial chamber constructed of flagstones with a lintelled stone roof, which held the skeletal remains of at least 15 individuals, neatly sorted and stacked, and the cremated remains of another person. The unburned bones were not arranged as full skeletons but rather sorted into groups of skulls, long bones, and so on, suggesting they were placed elsewhere for some time prior to interment.

Around the central cist, an oval of stone slabs was set, externally supported by a bank of shingle, and the oval area was filled with shingle and slabs. Outside the shingle bank, seven more small cists were found, some containing cremated bones. The area was then covered with a long mound of sand in the outer oval setting of stones.

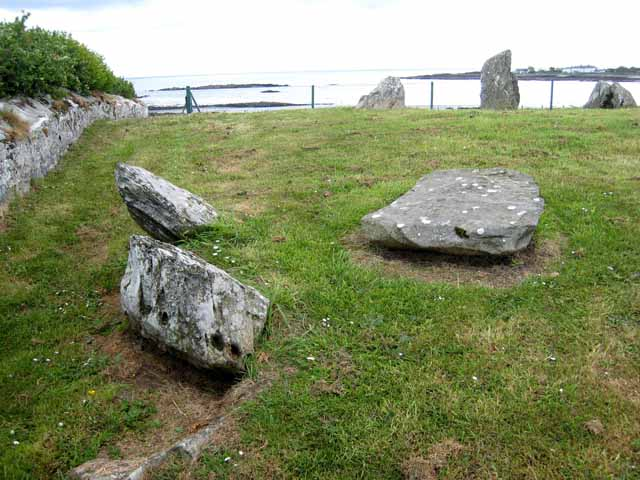
Millin Bay Cairn

A number of the stones were decorated with pecked curvilinear and rectilinear motifs, suggesting a link with the passage tomb tradition. The site also contained flints, a piece of a polished axe, pieces of a Neolithic pottery bowl, and fragments of Carrowkeel ware pottery.

DNA tests have shown links between some bones found at Millin Bay and those at Newgrange. Today, only the tops of the dozen stones of the cairn's peristalith can be seen, overlooking the little bay.

=== Geophysical survey ===
Geophysical surveys and small-scale test excavations were conducted in 2004–2005 to the south of the Millin Bay Neolithic mortuary monument. These efforts aimed to better understand the extent, function, and date of the drystone wall noted in the original 1955 excavations by Collins and Waterman. The survey failed to identify buried features or locate the partially intact wall section noted earlier. The absence of a buried land surface at the wall's base and the small extent of the excavations hindered a full understanding of the larger stones' spread and arrangement. The excavations were only partly successful, identifying large stones likely from a collapsed wall structure in the two trenches nearest the monument. Late medieval/early modern pit features with darker fills and charcoal fragments were also found in all three trenches above the remnant wall. Finds included a single struck flint and a corroded piece of modern iron.

== Gallery ==
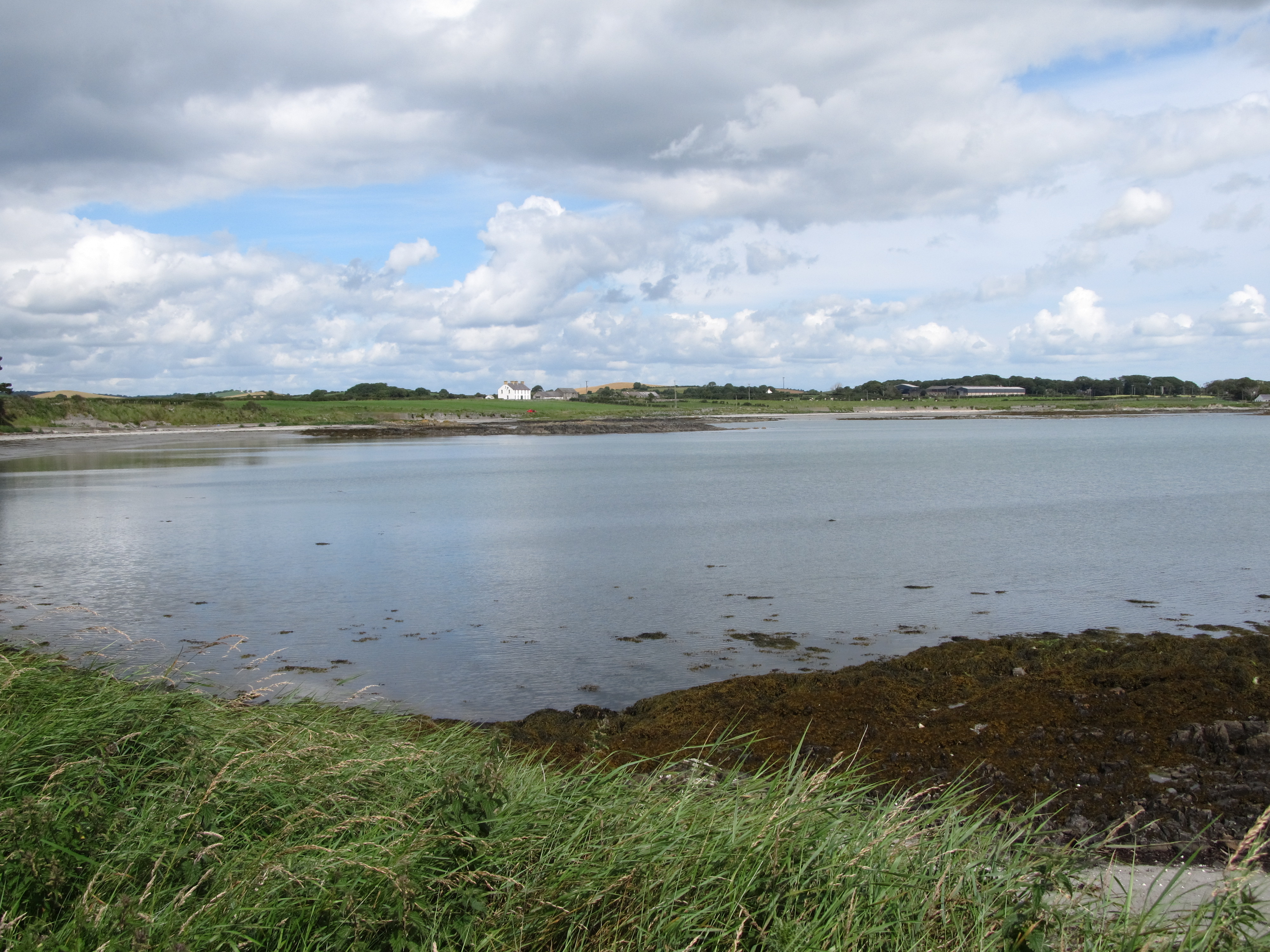
The white farmhouse on the raised beach stands adjacent to the Millin Bay Cairn

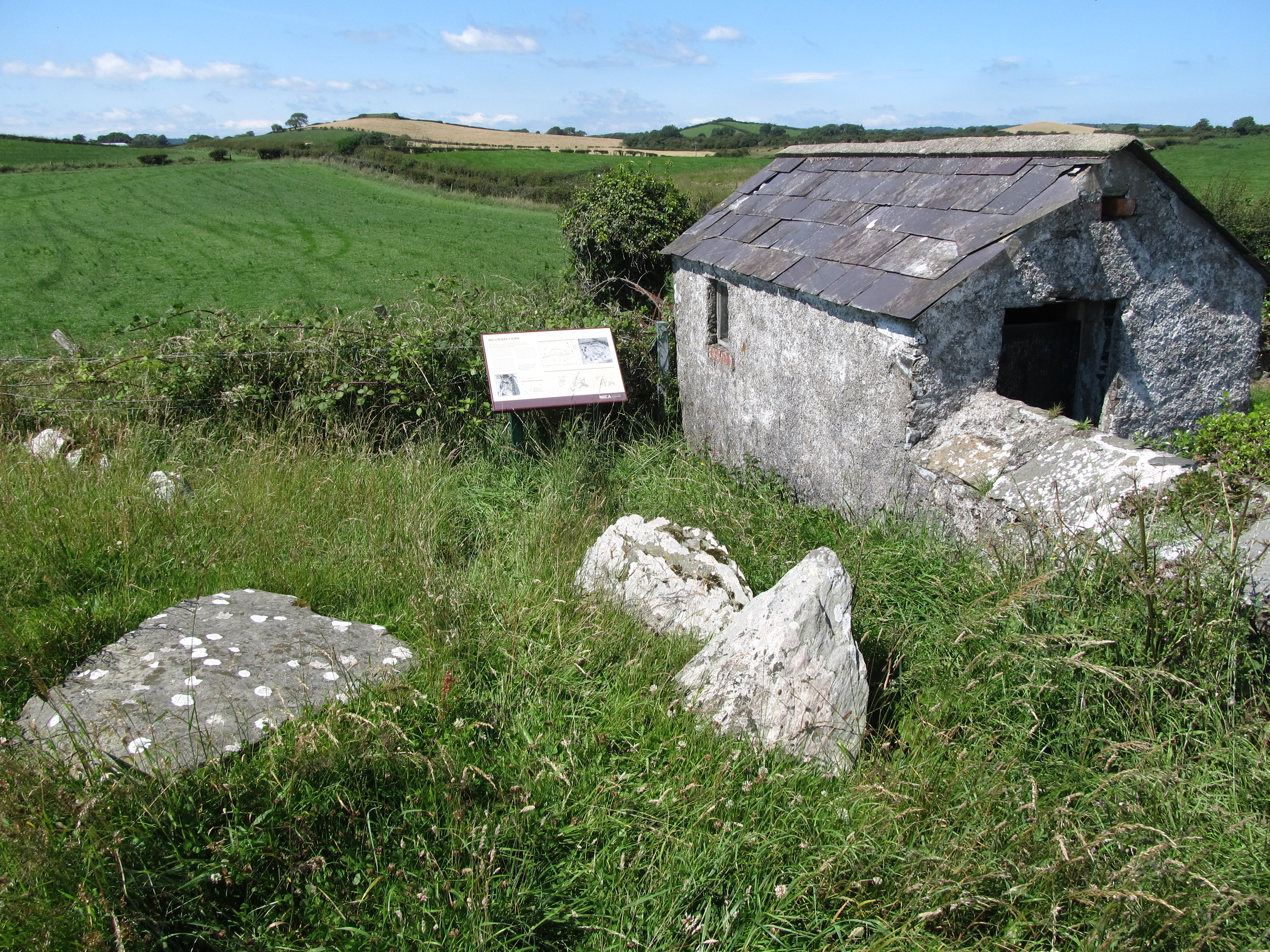
Historic site information board at Millin Bay Cairn

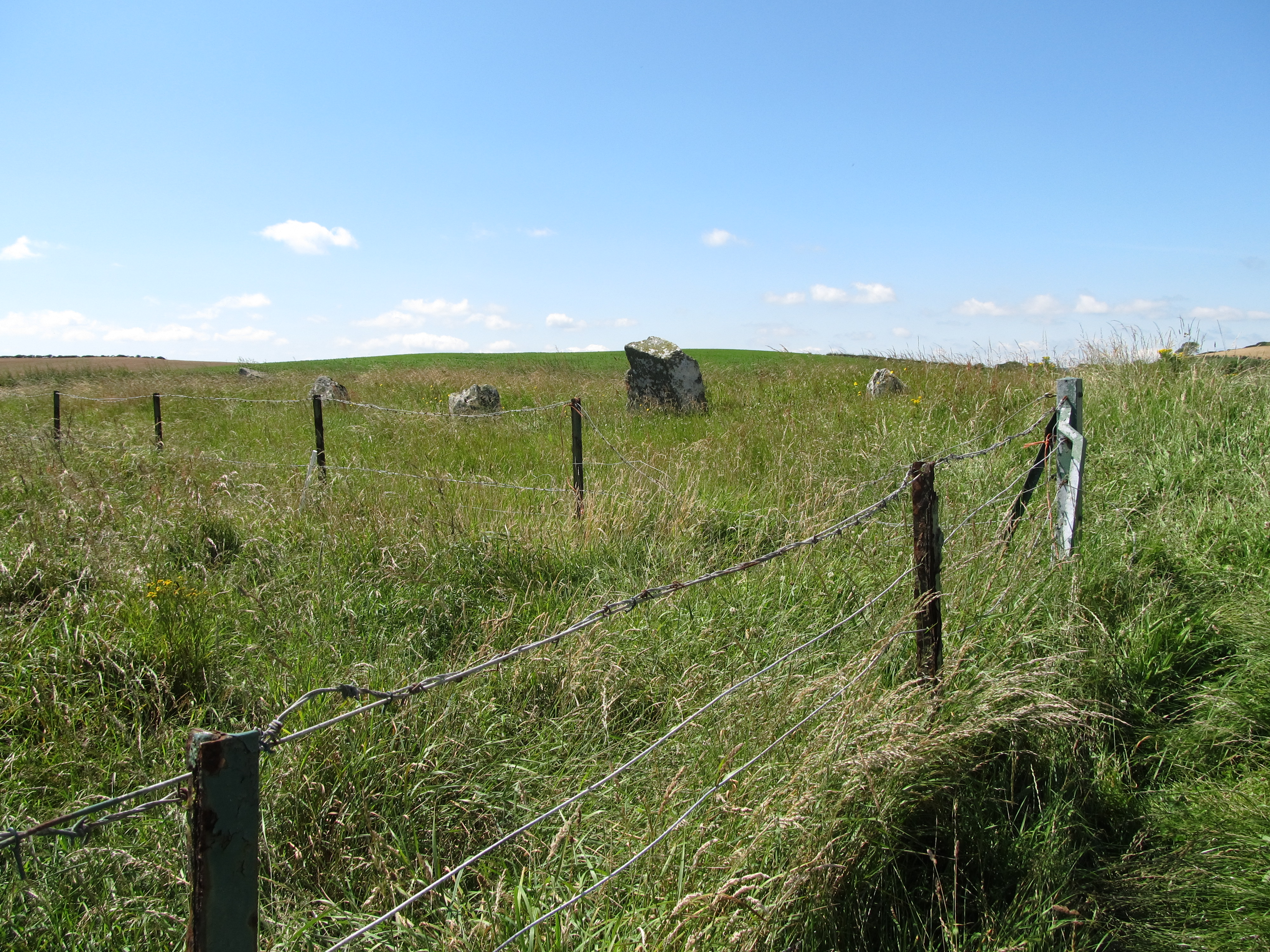
The overgrown site of the Millin Bay Cairn in 2017

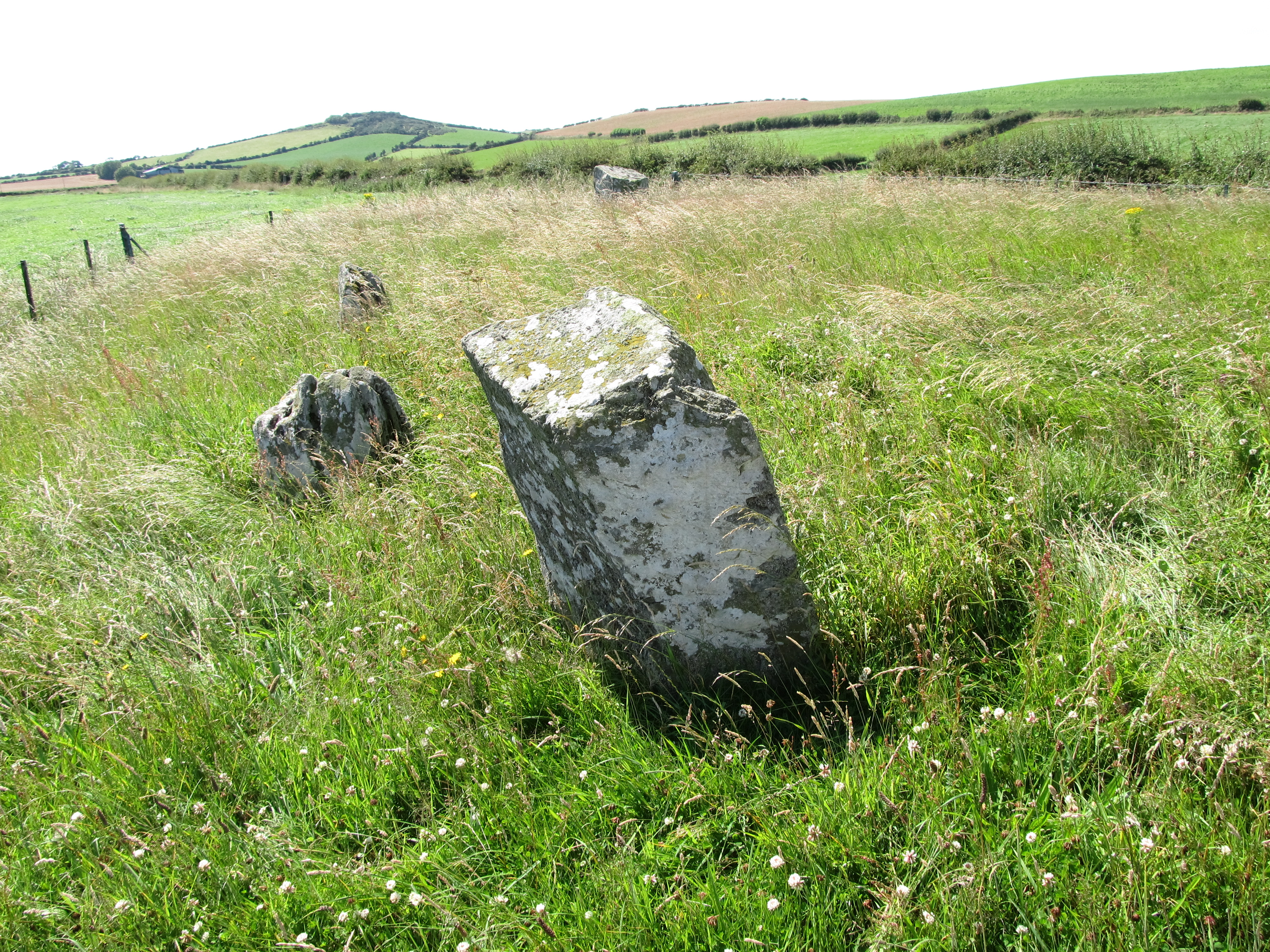
Millin Bay Cairn

The cairn in 2024

== Geography ==
Townlands that border Keentagh include:

- Ballyfounder to the west
- Ballymarter to the east
- Craigaroddan to the north
- Killydressy to the west
- Tara to the south
- Tieveshilly to the west
