= Magheradrool =

Civil parish in County Down, Northern Ireland

Magheradrool is a civil parish in County Down, Northern Ireland. It is situated mainly in the historic barony of Kinelarty, with one townland in the barony of Iveagh Lower, Lower Half. It is also a townland of 503 acres.

== Settlements ==
The civil parish contains the following settlements:

- Ballynahinch
- Drumaness

== Townlands ==
Magheradrool civil parish contains the following townlands:

- Ballycreen
- Ballykine Lower
- Ballykine Upper
- Ballylone Big
- Ballylone Little
- Ballymacarn North
- Ballymacarn South
- Ballymaglave North
- Ballymaglave South
- Ballynahinch
- Creevytenant
- Cumber
- Drumaness
- Drumsnade
- Glasdrumman
- Magheradrool
- Magheraknock
- Magheratimpany

== See also ==
- List of civil parishes of County Down
