= Loughbrickland Crannóg =

Ancient artificial island in Northern Ireland

Coordinates: 54.307°N 6.297°W

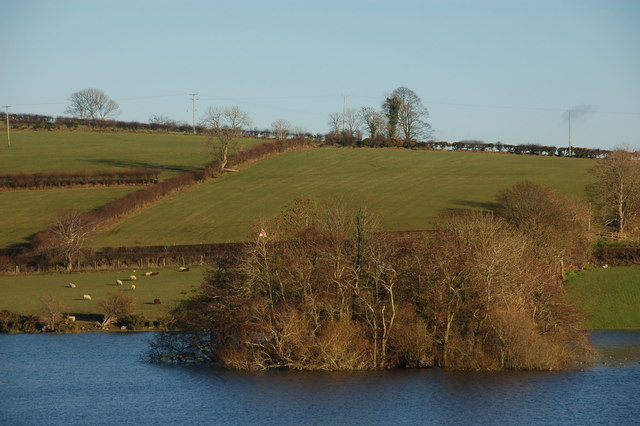
Loughbrickland Crannóg.

Loughbrickland Crannóg is a Bronze Age human-made island known as a crannóg, 4 miles (6.4 km) south west of Banbridge, County Down, Northern Ireland. It is situated in the middle of the lough, 1 mile (1.6 km) from the village of Loughbrickland. The crannóg in Loughbrickland is a Scheduled Historic Monument in the townland of Drumnahare, in Banbridge District, at grid reference J1113 4118. It is easily visible from the south-bound carriageway of the trunk A1 Belfast-Dublin route, just past the B3 Rathfriland exit.
