= Ballyfounder Rath =

Ringfort in Northern Ireland

Ballyfounder Rath is the remains of a ringfort situated on the Ards Peninsula, in County Down, Northern Ireland. It consists of a circular mound about 20m in diameter, with traces of an outer bank and ditch. It is a Scheduled Historic Monument and is at grid ref: J6207 4954.
