= Mahee Castle =

Castle on Mahee Island, County Down, Northern Ireland

Mahee Castle Nendrum Castle
- Mahee Island, County Down, Northern Ireland
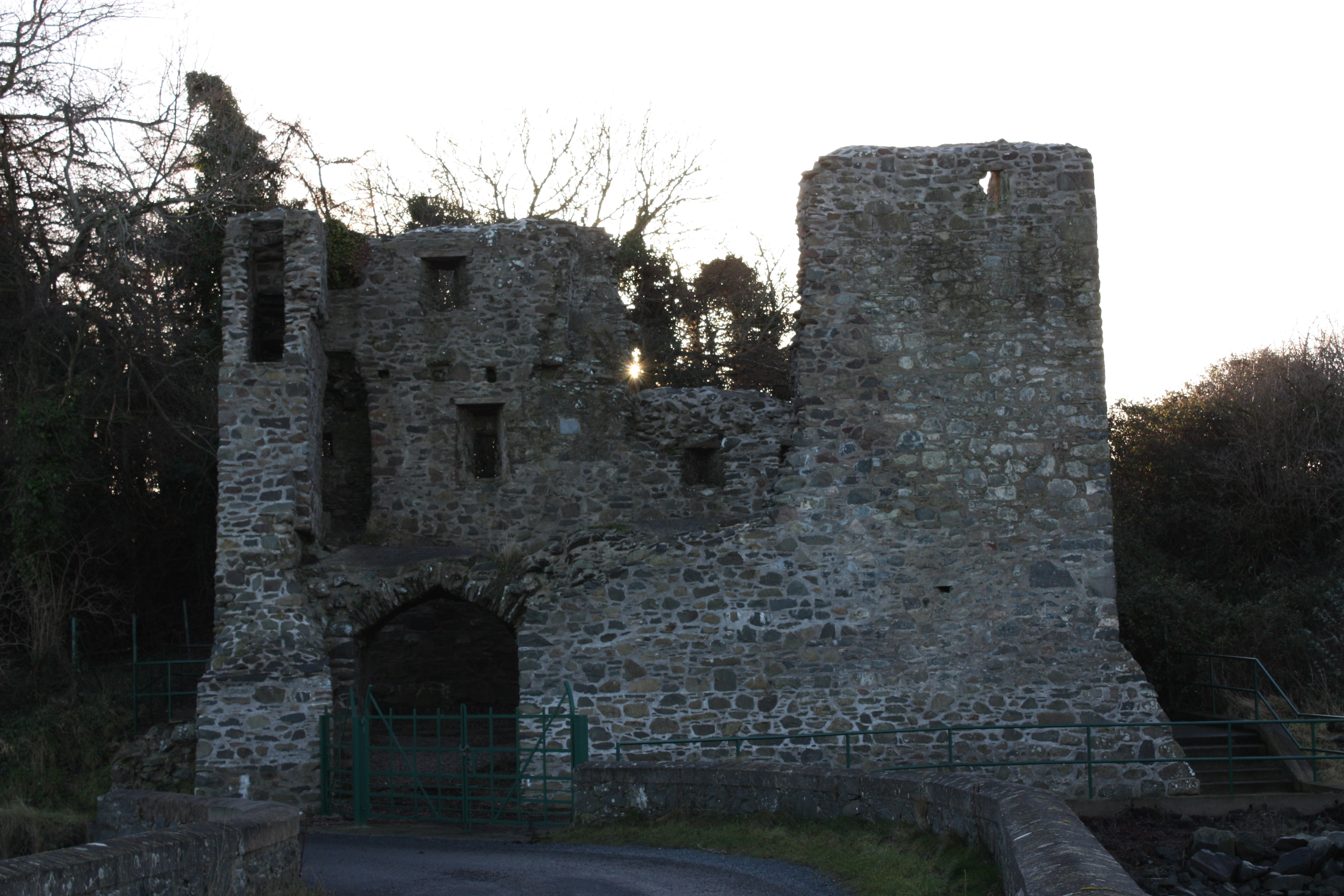
- Mahee Castle from the west

Site information
- Type: Tower house
- Open to the public: Yes
- Condition: Ruined

Location
- Coordinates: 54.500951°N 5.648475°W
- Height: 25 feet (7.6 m)

Site history
- Built: 1570
- Built by: Captain Thomas Browne
- In use: 16th–17th centuries

Mahee Castle, also known as Nendrum Castle, is a small ruined tower house near Nendrum Monastery on Mahee Island in Strangford Lough, County Down, Northern Ireland. It was built in 1570 by Captain Thomas Browne. It was abandoned by the early 17th century, and fell into disrepair. In 1923, H.C. Lawlor and the Belfast Natural History and Philosophical Society partly renovated the tower house to avoid further erosion and built a buttress wall to support the northwest corner of the tower.

== Location ==
Mahee Castle is in the west of Mahee Island. It is beside a causeway; the only land crossing to the island. Today this causeway is crossed by a narrow road. Mahee Island is near the western shore of Strangford Lough, southeast of the town of Comber. The tower house sits on a drumlin. Nearby is a car park.

== Architecture ==
The rectangular tower house guards the bridge onto the island, and to the southwest there are the remains of a walled enclosure, known as a bawn. Mahee Castle encloses a boatbay, lying on the shore of the lake, and is quite small, with only two rooms on the ground floor. The main part, the tower-house, is three stories tall, although little remains of the upper floors. The entrance passes under a murder-hole.

== History ==
The tower house was built in 1570 by an English soldier, Captain Thomas Browne, after petition to the Bishop of Down. It was abandoned by the early 17th century. The corner stones may have been taken for local building projects, and stones from the northeastern wall were used to make the causeway to the island. During the 15th and 16th centuries, Mahee Castle was near the border of two territories: Clandeboye to the north and Dufferin to the south. At this time the area would have been subject to border conflicts, and Mahee Castle may have changed hands many times.

In 1923, under the direction of H.C. Lawlor, restoration works were undertaken by the Belfast Natural History and Philosophical Society. As part of this work, ivy was removed from the wall, cracks were grouted with cement, the top was waterproofed and a buttress wall was built to support the northeast corner of the tower.

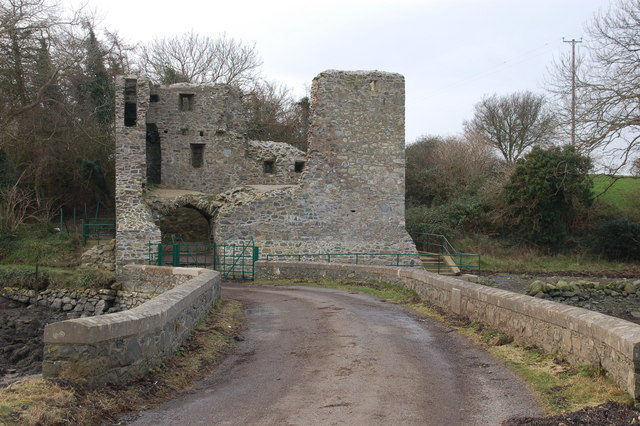
Mahee Castle in 2007

=== Excavations ===
Under a program sponsored by the Environment and Heritage Service of Ireland, archaeological excavations were carried out at Mahee Castle during 2001 and 2002. This included detailed stratigraphic sequencing, which revealed animal remains and remnants dated to the Late Medieval period, meaning that the building could have existed before 1570. The goal of the excavations was to evolve a restoration program.

The archaeological finds consisted of shells and animal bones, knives and an array of pottery ranging over several centuries. Large quantities of modern glass were found, in addition to flint and pot shards. The excavations revealed that the foundation of the tower was on an artificial terrace which was created for the purpose on the northeastern end of a drumlin. The rear end of this terrace had been stabilised by a buttress retaining wall built in 1923, 4 metres (13 ft) from the tower's southwestern end.
