= Blathewyc =

Blathewyc or Blathewic (from Irish Uí Blathmaic, meaning 'descendants of Blathmac') is the name of several historical territorial divisions in what is now County Down, Northern Ireland. It is the anglicised name of an ancient Irish túath, ruled by the Uí Blathmaic, later becoming a barony, bailiwick, and county in the Anglo-Norman Earldom of Ulster.

== Uí Blathmaic ==
Blathewyc is an anglicisation of the Irish tribal name Uí Blathmaic, which means the "descendants of Blathmac". They take their name from Blathmac, who was of the Dál Fiatach. Blathmac is cited as being the son of Áed Róin mac Bécce Bairrche, an over-king of Ulaid who died in 735. Their territory roughly matched the later barony of Castlereagh Lower. According to historian James O'Laverty, "Their territory extended from the vicinity of Bangor to that of Carrickmannon, and included the modern civil parishes of Holywood, Dundonald, Comber, Killinchy, Kilmood, Tullynakill, with parts of Bangor, Newtownards, and Knock-breda."

== Bailiwick and county ==
After the invasion of Ulaid in 1177 by the Norman knight John de Courcy, and its subsequent conquest, the neighbouring districts of Aird Uladh and Uí Blathmaic were combined to form a county, which was styled as "Comitatus de Arde" and "Comitatus Novae Villae". This county was divided into two bailiwicks: "Balliva del Art" and "Balliva de Blathewick", with its capital at Nove Ville de Blathwyc (present-day Newtownards).

In 1345, Edward III, appointed Robertus de Halywode as sheriff of "Comitatus Nove Ville de Blawico".
