= Castlereagh (County Down barony) =

Castlereagh An Caisleán Riabhach (Irish)
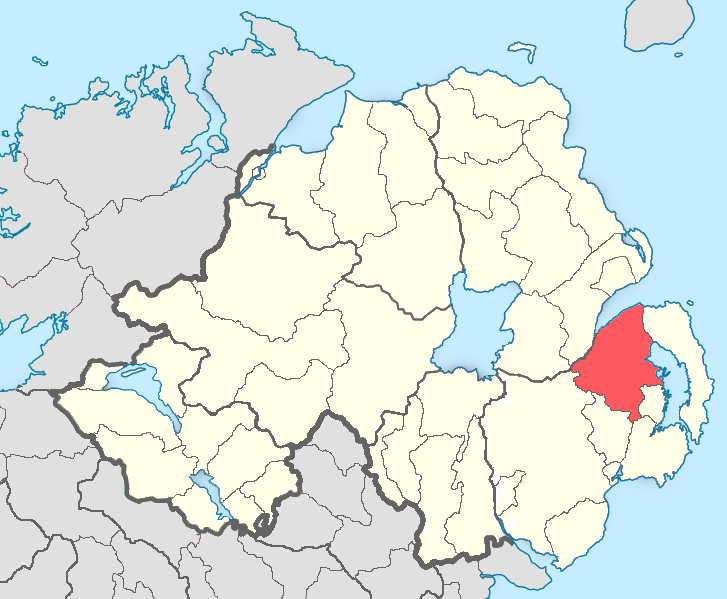
- Location of Castlereagh, County Down, in present-day Northern Ireland.
- Sovereign state: United Kingdom
- Country: Northern Ireland
- County: Down

Castlereagh (from Irish An Caisleán Riabhach, meaning 'the grey castle') is the name of a former barony in County Down, present-day Northern Ireland. It spanned the north-eastern area of the county bordering the baronies of: Ards to the east; Belfast to the north; Iveagh to the west south; and Dufferin, Kinelarty, and Lecale to the south. By 1841 the barony was divided into Castlereagh Lower and Castlereagh Upper.
