= Drumhirk =

Townland in Northern Ireland

Coordinates: 54°31′36″N 5°44′54″W

Drumhirk: Irish: Droim Thoirc
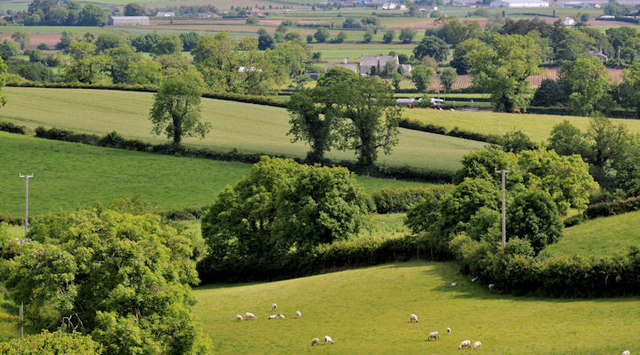
- Drumhirk Fields 2012

- Location within County Down
- Area: 0.805 sq mi (2.08 km^{2})
- Irish grid reference: J4617766123
  - Belfast: 8.5 mi (13.7 km)
- District: Ards and North Down
- County: County Down
- Country: Northern Ireland
- Sovereign state: United Kingdom
- Post town: NEWTOWNARDS
- Postcode district: BT23
- Dialling code: 028
- Police: Northern Ireland
- Fire: Northern Ireland
- Ambulance: Northern Ireland
- UK Parliament: Strangford
- NI Assembly: Strangford

Drumhirk (from Irish: Droim Thoirc, meaning "ridge of the wild boar") is a rural townland between Ballygowan and Comber in County Down, Northern Ireland. It has an area of 515.2 acres (2.085 km^{2}). It is situated in the civil parish of Kilmood, the Poor Law Union of Newtownards and the historic barony of Castlereagh Lower. Located 2 miles south of Comber, it lies within the Electoral Division of Newtownards North which is part of the Ards and North Down Borough Council.

== See also ==
- List of townlands in County Down
