= Saint John's Point, County Down =

Cape on the coast of Northern Ireland

Saint John’s Point Rinn Theach Eoin
- Cape
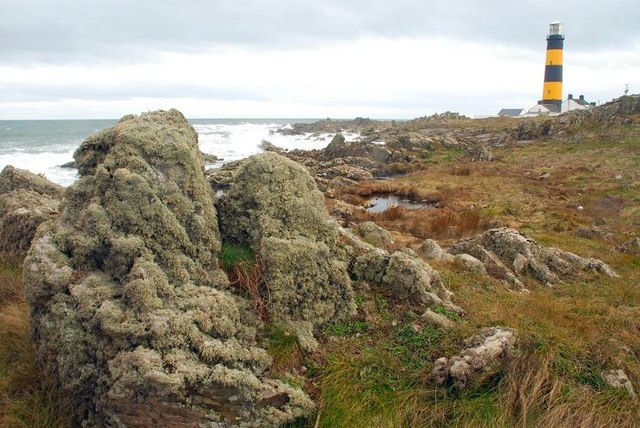
- Rocky shore facing South East

- Location within County Down
- Coordinates: 54.226113°N 5.659284°W
- Grid position: SB 61579 87339
- Location: Newry, Mourne and Down, Northern Ireland
- Part of: Lecale
- Water bodies: Irish Sea

Saint John's Point or St. John's Point (Irish: Rinn Theach Eoin) is a cape at the southern tip of the Lecale peninsula of County Down, Northern Ireland, separating Dundrum Bay from Killough Harbour, which forms its northern extremity. The cape is in the Irish Sea and derives its name from a now ruined church dedicated to Saint John, being recorded here since at least 1170. A well-known beacon in the north-eastern Irish Sea, St. John's Point Lighthouse, built in 1844, sits near its southern tip and, at 40 m (130 ft), is the tallest lighthouse in Ireland (the Fastnet Lighthouse, though taller, is offshore).

== Etymology ==
The headland derives its name from the now ruined church of Saint John. It was recorded in the Irish language as Tech Eoin, "(Saint) John's house", in c. 1170. It also seems to have been known as Stech Eoin, which is a common variant.

Historic Names
Form	Reference date	Reference
Stechian	1183	Grant of Bishop Malachy to Abbatia Sancti Patricii in Down, AD 1183
Styoun, Ecclesia de	1306c	Ecclesiastical taxation of the dioceses of Down, Connor, and Dromore
Ballihione al Rinchione	1549	Exchequer Inquisition (Down) 3 Ed. VI 17
St. Johns Point	1595	Ultoniae Orientalis Pars by Gerard Mercator
St Johns hauen	1599	Gennerall discription or chart of Irelande, AD 1599, by Baptista Boazio
St Johnstown	1603	Irish patent rolls of King James VI and I; 14a
Stion	1609	Grant of James I to the Cathedral of Down, AD 1609, 178
St John's poynt	1610	The Province Ulster described, AD 1610, by John Speed
St. Johane, Capella de	1615	Terrier or ledger book of Down and Connor, c. 1615
St Johnstowne	1617	Irish patent rolls of James I 14a 336a
Thigh Eóin i nUltoibh, Eóin, mac Carlain, ó	1630c	The martyrology of Donegal: a calendar of the saints of Ireland
St Johns poynt	1654	Vultonia; Hibernis Cujgujlly; Anglis Vlster, Joan Blaeu
St Johnstowne	1661	Books of Survey and Distribution: Armagh, Down & Antrim
St Hohn's Point als St Johnstowne	1708	Reg. Deeds (Index)
St John's Qr.	1708	Reg. Deeds (Index)
St Johnstowne	1708	Reg. Deeds (Index)
St Johnston in Rathmullan	1795	Register of Freeholders in County Down
Rinn Eoin (St) John's point or Baile Eoin (St) John's townland	1999	A Dictionary of Ulster Place-Names

== Geography and status ==
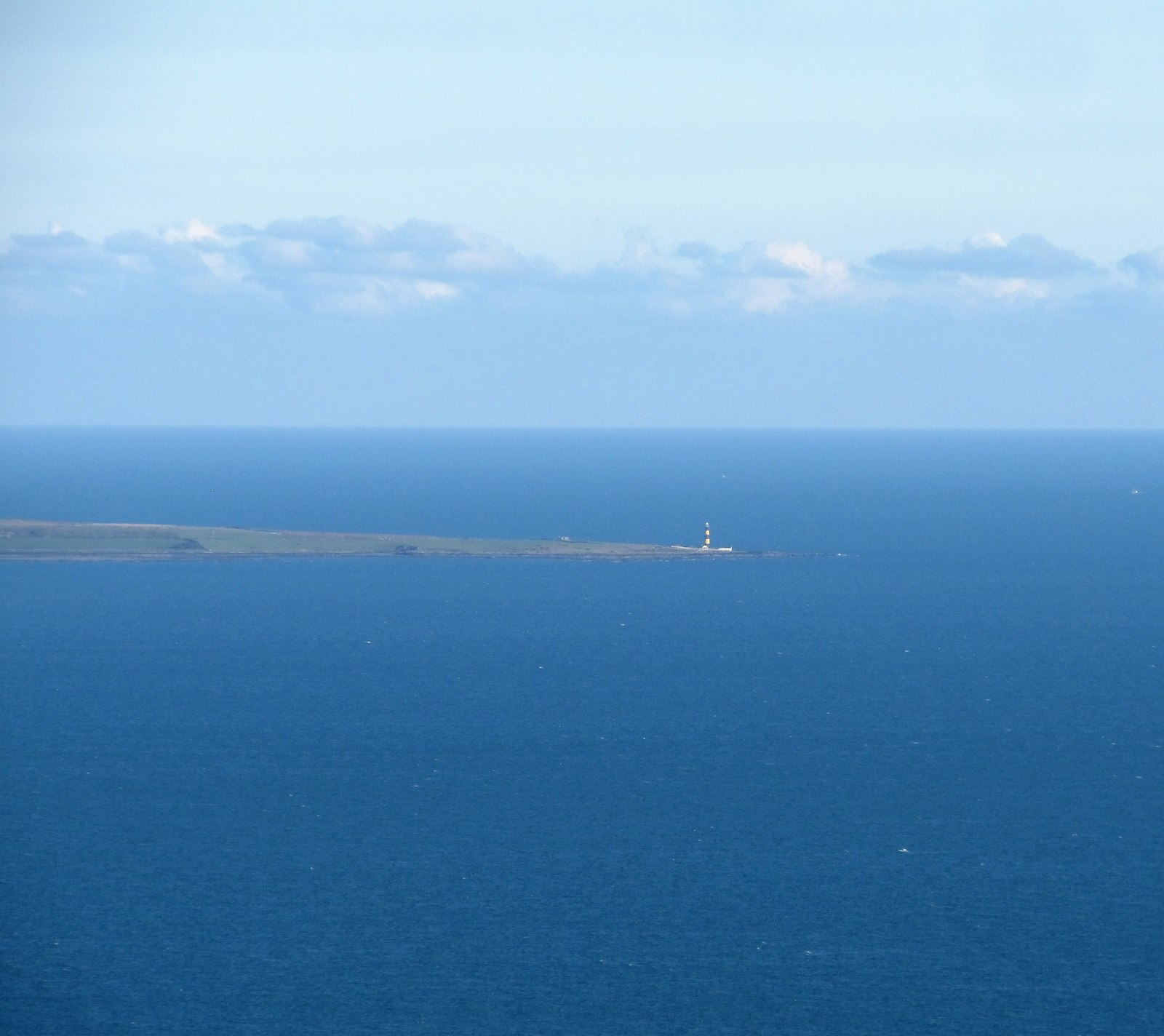
St John's Point seen from the Mourne Mountains

The cape extends approximately 2 miles south of Killough into the Irish sea, separating Killough Harbour from Dundrum Bay, and is surrounded by water on three sides, and the rest of the larger Lecale peninsula to the north. It raises nowhere more than a few meters above sea level and is mostly given over to agriculture with the majority of the land used for grazing cattle or arable production of crops, including potatoes.

Several roads traverse the area, with the Rossglass Road (part of the A2) roughly forming its northern extent.

The area technically forming St. John's point encompasses all or substantial parts of four townlands – Ballycam, Rossglass (part), Kilbride, and St. John's point – as well as elements of others. The formal townland of St. John's point encompasses only 1,284,384 m² or 317.38 acres, and thus a minority of the larger "St. John's point" area, ranking as 793rd largest townland in County Down.

== History ==
St. John's Point and the surrounding Lecale peninsula have been inhabited since pre-historic times, as attested to by the numerous Souterrains and other ancient remains in the area.

While the provenance of the church is not known, historians speculate that it is unlikely that the stone church which is known to have existed since at least the 1100s was the first on the site, and it would have been unusual that such a structure would have sat alone, without a monastic site or settlement in the area. In terms of affiliation, O’Laverty wrote that ‘in early times both the church of Rathmullan and the chapel of Saint John were appropriate to the order of St. John of Jerusalem’, suggesting that the church was a Knights Hospitaller institution at some point.

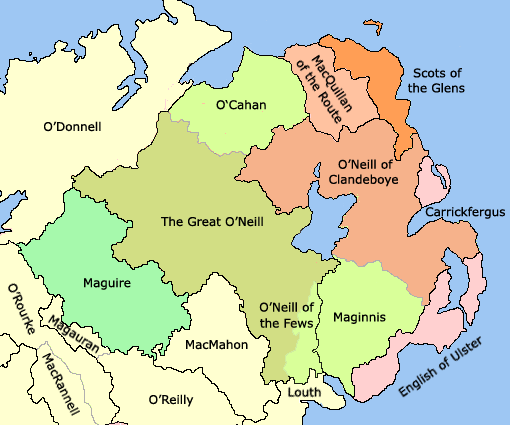
East Ulster, late 15th century

By the early modern period, St. John's point and the surrounding area was part of the Earldom of Ulster and under the control of the English of Ulster, and therefore not part of the lands further east subjected to the Jacobean Plantation of Ulster. Its church sees continued reference through historic sources as it (and its lands, income, and tithes) are transferred through various monarchical decrees and settlements – for example, Reeves records how as Stion it was annexed by the charter of James I to the Precentorship of Down, whilst at the dissolution of the monasteries, its tithes were (under the name 'St. Johnstown') were appropriated to the Preceptory of St. John in the Ards.

Writing in 1744 Harris stated:

The outer Bay of Dundrum is large and spacious, and formed by St. John's Point to the East, and the Point of Bealach-a-neir to the west, standing upwards of two Leagues asunder: both which Points are surrounded with Rocks. It is one of the most dangerous Bays for Shipping in the Kingdom, by reason of Sand-banks, which shift their stations almost in every storm

The area was subject to considerable improvement in the 18th and 19th centuries as local coastal trade grew, and the need to protect passing vessels against local hazards become more acute, the lighthouse and coastguard station being built in this period, and both not long after the improvement of the harbour at Killough.

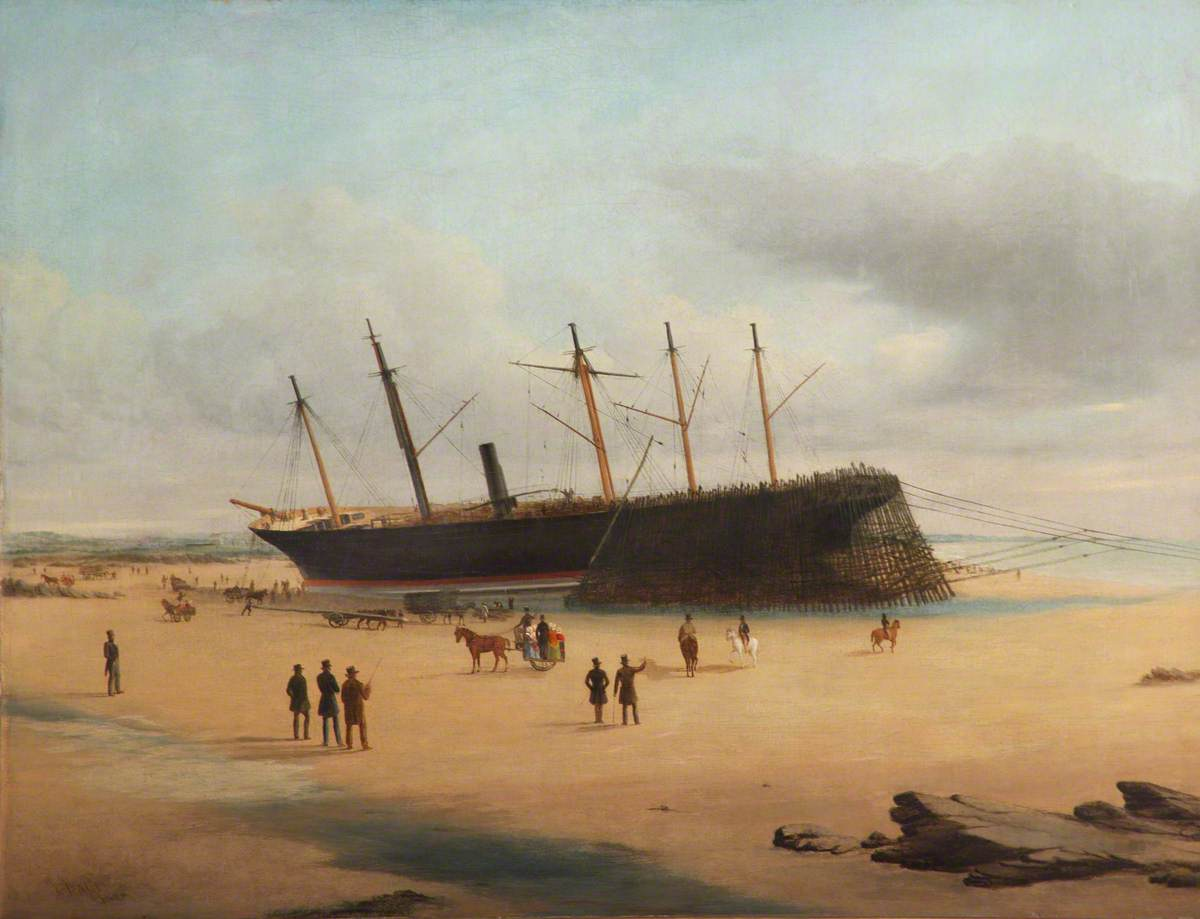
SS Great Britain stranded in Dundrum Bay, 1846

The area received international intention for the first time when, in 1846 and during her second season of service and not long after embarking for New York, the then largest vessel afloat, Great Britain made a series of navigational errors that resulted in her being run hard aground in Dundrum Bay just down the coast from St. John's point on 22 September. There was no formal inquiry but her Captain, James Hoken, is reported to have mistook the new St John's light for the Calf light on the Isle of Man, leading the then largest ship in the world to beach on the shore just west of St. John's point on the Down coast.

She remained aground for almost a year, protected by temporary measures organised by Brunel and James Bremner. On 25 August 1847, she was floated free at a cost of £34,000 and taken back to Liverpool, but this expense exhausted the company's remaining reserves. After languishing in Prince's Dock, Liverpool for some time, she was sold to Gibbs, Bright & Co., former agents of the Great Western Steamship Company, for a mere £25,000.

St. John's Point's importance in the local marine environment was attested to by the lighthouse's extension in the late 19th century and continued improvement, and, indeed, prior to her transfer to Southampton for fitting out, RMS Titanic conducted her sea trails in the Irish Sea and used Saint John's Light as a marker for those purposes.

A 2015 plan by the Commissioners of Irish Lights to replace the 19th century Fresnel lens atop the lighthouse with a modern, less bright LED equivalent, caused widespread disquiet in the local community, many of whom preferred the old light, according to then future MP for the area, Chris Hazzard. The local Member of Parliament, Margaret Ritchie, wrote to the then British and Irish Governments on the matter, as well as the Commissioners, and plans were subsequently abandoned with an alternative plan of investment in the lighthouse agreed instead.

== Features ==
The area, which extends from the harbour village of Killough southward includes many natural and manmade features, including the remains of a 19th Century Coast-guard station, at least three ruined early-Christian / Medieval churches, and a Souterrain of even more ancient lineage. The principal sites of interest still intact are:

=== St. John's Lighthouse ===
St John's Point Lighthouse
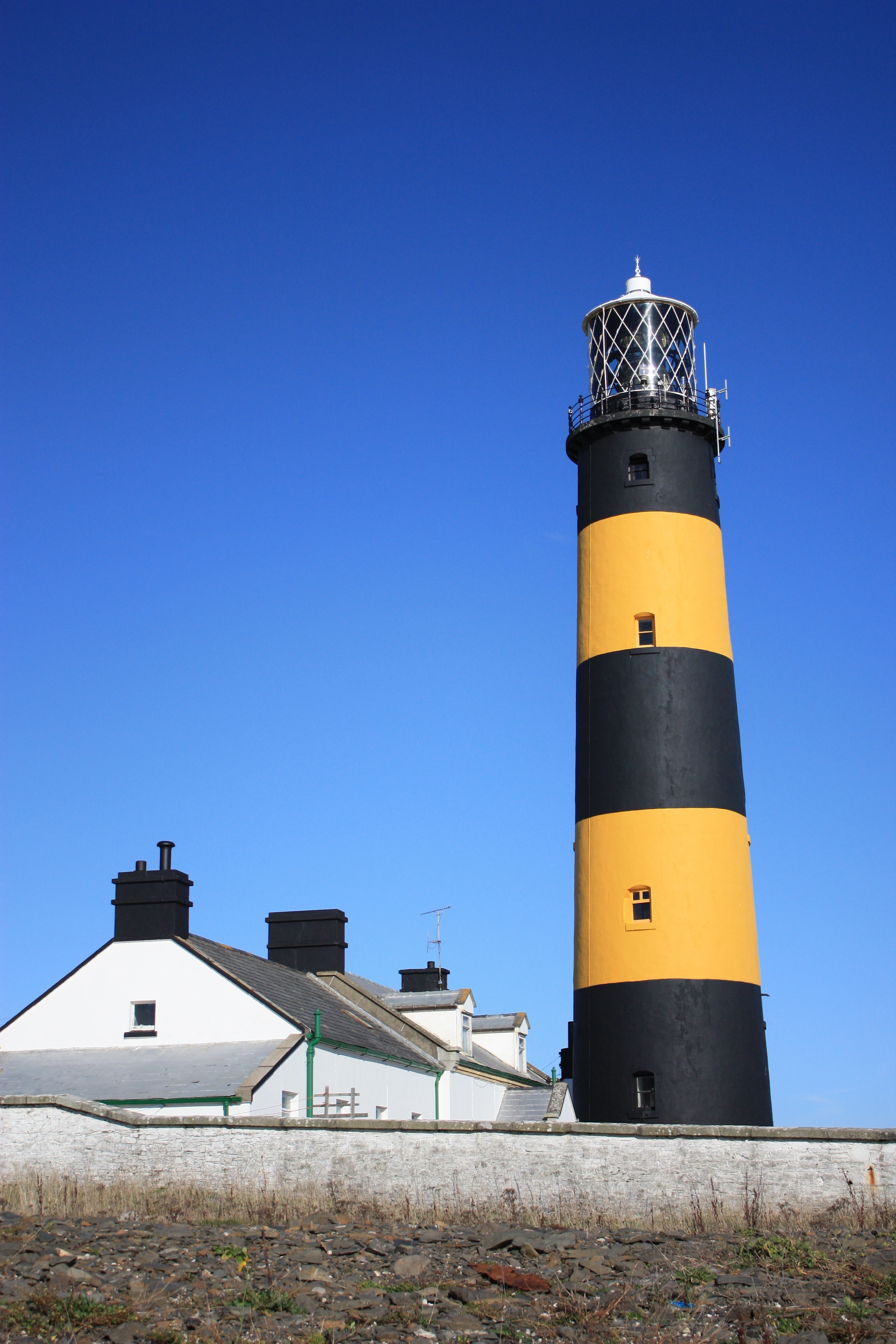
- Location: County Down, Down District Council, United Kingdom
- Coordinates: 54°13′34″N 5°39′33″W

Tower
- Constructed: 1844
- Construction: granite tower
- Automated: 1981
- Height: 40 metres (130 ft)
- Shape: Cylindrical tapering Tower
- Markings: Black and Yellow bands, black lantern
- Operator: Commissioners of Irish Lights
- Heritage: Grade B1 listed building

Light
- Focal height: 37 m (121 ft)
- Range: 25 nmi (46 km; 29 mi)
- Characteristic: Q(2) W 7.5s

One of the county's best known landmarks, and rising over 40 meters above the rocky shore, St. John's point lighthouse is listed as one of twelve the "Great Lighthouses of Ireland" by the Commissioners of Irish Lights, who operate it as one of the 65 active lighthouses on the Irish coast.

Fully automated since 1981, the lighthouse has been painted black with two distinctive yellow bands since 1954, and operates a main light with a range of up to 29 miles (47 km), as well as auxiliary lights focused on warning passing craft of dangers in nearby Dundrum Bay. In addition to night-time operation, the light is in use during daylight hours when visibility is poor.

The improvement of the nearby harbour at Killough n the late 18th and early 19th centuries had hastened the need for a beacon at what had long been regarded as an exposed and treacherous part o the east-Ulster coast (see Harris above) Construction of the lighthouse was approved by the Ballast Board in 1839 (officially the Corporation for Preserving and Improving the Port of Dublin), with Capt. P. R. Browne, from a leading gentry family in the locale, acting as building contractor. The Marquis of Downshire laid the foundation stone. The station consisted of a white 45 foot high tower and two small houses. On 1 May 1844, the light was established with a range of 12 mi (19 km). The light was changed from white to red on 1 July 1860.

Throughout the 19th century, a series of improvements were made including converting the fuel source for the light to gas supplied from an on-site gas works. By far and away the most important of these alterations were carried out between 1891 and 1893, when the height of the tower was increased to 120 feet (37 m).

The early 20th century saw further refinements to the lighthouse and 1902, when three black bands were added to the tower. The gas burners were upgraded, and in 1908 an 920mm Fresnel lens was installed.

The daymark was changed to black with two yellow bands in 1954. The dwellings and the auxiliary light were provided with electricity. On 5 September 1957, the 084° bearing was altered to 078°. In this period, the lighthouse also established a curious connection with (then future) Irish playwright, Brendan Behan, who was employed as a painter at the lighthouse station. Seemingly unsuited to the task, the lightkeeper, one Mr. Blakely complained to the Commissioners of Irish Lights that Behan was "the worst specimen" he had met in 30 years' service and someone "not amenable to any law and order". Reportedly wasteful, poorly skilled, and indigent, Blakely requested Behan be dismissed "before the place is ruined", however, reportedly he was rehired for similar work the following year.

The fog signal was discontinued on in January 2011 but the light is used during daylight hours when visibility is poor.

The former keepers' cottages and outbuildings have been operated by the Irish Landmark Trust and operated as tourist accommodation since 2015, however, access to the lighthouse tower is generally restricted and only open to public access on a limited basis.

Following on from a consultation process in 2015, the lighthouse was selected as one of the Irish Landmark Trust's capital projects, with restoration and increased access works to be undertaken in the period 2021/2022 and encompassing a range of improvements including:

- Retain the use of the existing rotating historic lens and sweeping beam
- Change the power system to mains with battery backup
- Remove mercury and diesel generator
- Replace filament lamps (1,000 watts) with LED (90 watts)
- Retain auxiliary light with LED equivalent
- Reduce the range of the light to 18 miles, as per 2010 and 2015 Aids to Navigation Reviews
- Remove interior wall lining and expose the original masonry of the lighthouse tower
- Provide opportunities for alternative use of buildings
- Reduce cost and maintenance requirements at the lighthouse
- Provide full range (18 mile) emergency lanterns

The lighthouse remains in public ownership and has the Historic Building Number HB18/10/048

=== St. John's Church ===
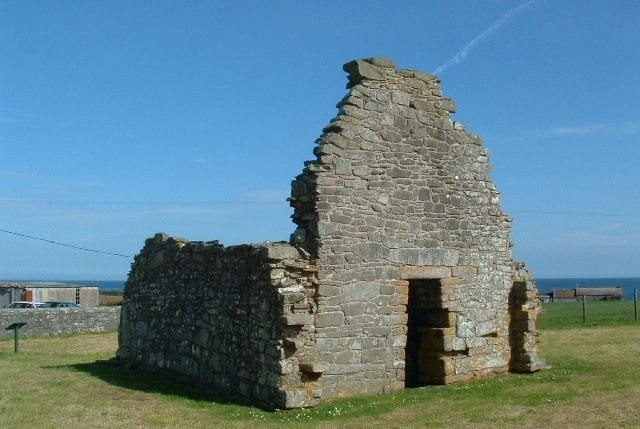
St. John's Church, West front

A pre-Romanesque church dating from as early as the 8th Century but more likely the 10th or 11th centuries, and now ruined, this is one of only a handful of examples in Ulster which survive from the Early Christian Period. The site is associated with Eoan, son of Cairland, who may have established a monastery here, and it is suspected that the structure now visible may not have been the first on the site – wooden dairthech (oak house) being the most popular form of early church in Ireland, while excavation in the 1970s (see below) seems to indicate the current structure succeeded another, older, building.

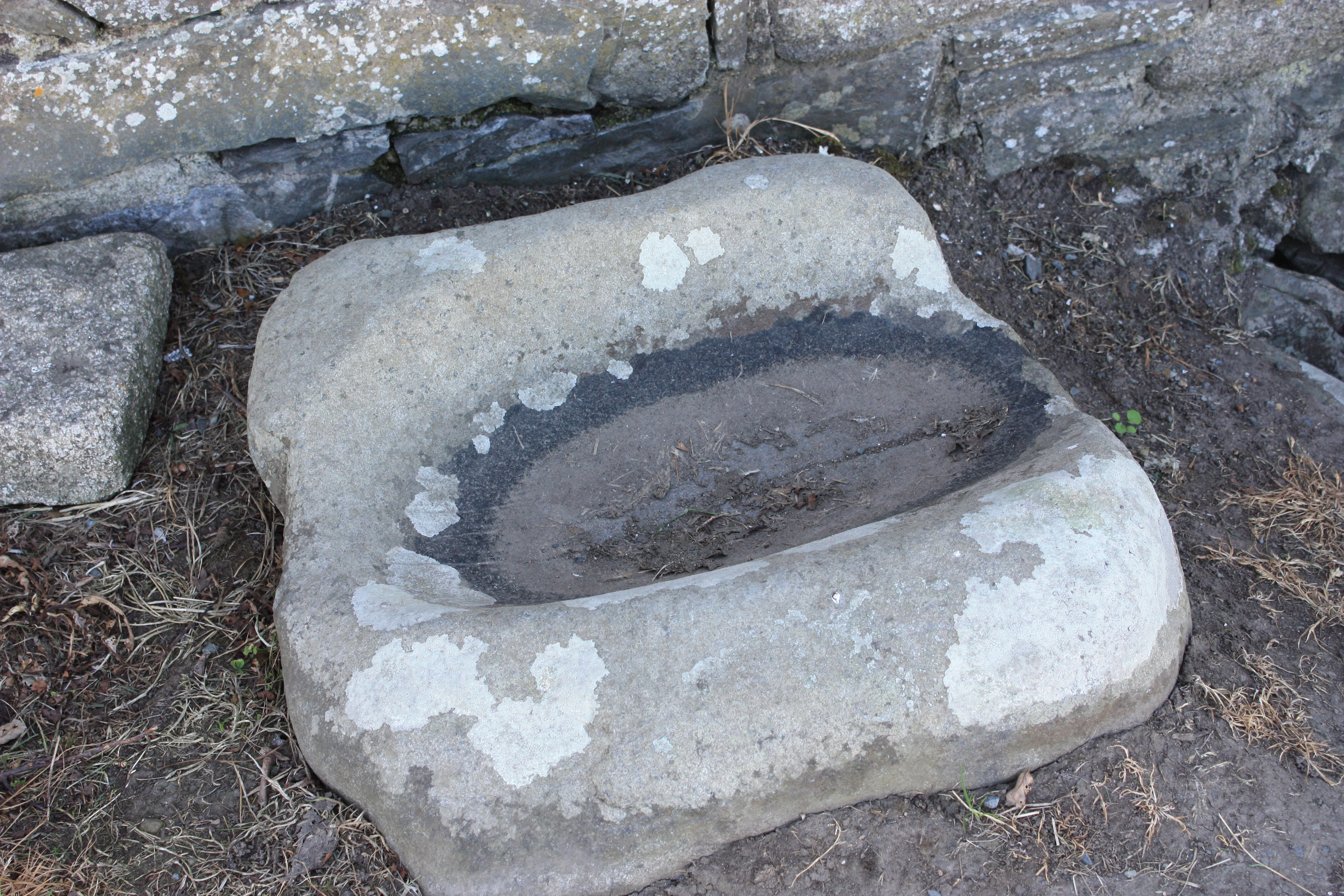
Bullaun at St John's Church, October 2009

Although ruined, the church retains some of the characteristic features of early stone churches, including the lintelled western door (which opens out onto panoramic views of the sea and Mourne Mountains); and "antae" projections from the side walls which may have been part of the roof support system. In addition to the roof and interior detailing, the eastern wall has been lost above the level of the foundation. One interesting feature of the church, albeit to its east and just outside the modern boundary wall is the Bullaun stones (from the Irish buldán, meaning a hollow on a stone), often associated with holy wells and sacred spaces, rainwater collected there being used for sacred / healing purposes, albeit the use of this and other stones of this nature is not altogether clear.

In Autumn 1977, a small excavation was carried out which involved digging two trenches – one inside and one outside the north wall of the church, the purpose of which, amongst other things, being to determine whether Wakeman's 1848 assertion that a burial ground surrounded the church with graves arranged radially around the structure. Although 23 graves were uncovered in the small dig, no evidence of a radial pattern was found by the excavation team. They did, however, find the age of burials ranged from newborns to (a few) adults aged 45 and over; heights were below modern average equivalents and only one individual had lived to old age (typical for the Early Christian / Medieval periods); and the site may have been used as a child burial ground in a later period. Further, an association with quartz pebbles in a number of graves was noted, reflecting an ancient tradition of burial with white stones and shells.

The church is currently under the care of the Northern Ireland Environment Agency and has the Sites and Monuments Record reference DOW 045:013.

=== St. John's House or Janeville ===
A late-Georgian (early 1830s) country house of three-bays with canted ends, and accompanies by a series of later additions and out-building's, this substantial gentry residence opens onto the sea at its rear and, together with its large gate-screen, is listed as a class B1 Protected Structure.

Originally known asJaneville, it was named after Ms. Mary Jane Smyth, scion to an old established family in the area whose conformity with the established church was supposed to have seen them rise in prominence. Ms. Smyth married to Peter Rutledge Montagu Browne, of Westport, County Mayo and enlisted in the 9th Regiment of Foot in 1830, with the house being constructed for the couple at approximately the same time. Browne was instrumental in promoting marine safety in the area, partook in the rescue of several ships, and was instrumental in the building of the nearby lighthouse in the early 1840s.

In 1864 the house passed to the founder's son, Major General Andrew Smythe Montague Browne, at which time the St. John's House appellation seems to have replaced Janeville, and after whose death in 1916 it was sold to a Mr. Bernard Kelly, who held it until 1949. The house was later owned and used as a residence for a number of years by prominent Unionist MP, barrister, and founding chairman of the DUP, Desmond Boal.

The house is currently in private ownership (on the market in 2021) and has the Listed Buildings reference: HB18/10/044.

== See also ==
- Lecale
- Ards Peninsula
- Downpatrick
- List of lighthouses in Ireland
- List of RNLI stations
