= List of clans and septs in Ulaid =

Below is a list of clans and septs in Ulaid, in medieval Ireland.

== A ==
- Clann Aodha (O'Hughes), whose chiefs ruled in the area of modern County Down near its border with modern County Antrim.
- Mac Aodh (McGee), who ruled Semne (present-day Islandmagee, County Antrim), in Dál nAraidi.
- Mag Aonghusa or Mag Aonghuis, meaning "Angus". Variants include Magennis, Maginnis, MacGuinness, MacCreesh, and MacAngus descending from Artán Angus M‘C, son of Artán, son of Faghartagh they were originally chiefs of Clann Aodha (Clan Hugh), under the dominion of the Uí hEachaidh. By the 12th century they had briefly become lords of Uí Echach Cobo.
- Mac Artáin, meaning "son of Artán". Generally anglicised as MacCartan, it was interchangeable in the Newry and Clough area with MacCartney, and in the Moira area with MacCarten. They were chiefs of Cineál Faghartagh (now the baronies of Kinelarty and Dufferin), however they were Kings, Princes and lords of Uí Eachach Cobo for numerous periods starting in the B.C timelines right up to the late fifteenth century. They descend from Artán, son of Faghartagh, son of Mongan, son of Sárán, they eventually became tributaries of the Ó Néill.

== C ==
- Cenél Caeilbaidh of Dál nAraidi.
- Uí Ceallaigh (Kelly) of the Clan Brasil Mac Coolechan in County Down.
- Síl Ciarain, meaning the "seed of Ciarain", they belonged to the Uí Fiachrach of Dún Da Én (Duneane, County Antrim) in Dál nAraidi.
- Uí Choelbad, the primary ruling sept of the Dál nAraidi based at Magh Line.
- Uí Coltarain (Coulter), whose chiefs ruled Dál Coirbin in the Dál nAraidi minor-kingdom of Dál mBuinne.
- Clanna Conaill Chernaig, a sept of the Dál nAraidi, though also noted in Uí Echach Ulad and Conaille Muirtheimne. They held land from Carrec Indbeir Uisci or Indbeir Uacht to Lind Buachalla. They claim descent from Conall Cernach, an Ulaid hero in the Ulster Cycle of Irish mythology and from whom the Dál nAraidi originate.
- Corco Chaelraidi, also spelt as Corcraige Chaelraidi, meaning the "race of Chaelraidi". Belonged to the Dál nAraidi.

== D ==
- Uí Díchon, meaning "descendants of Díchu mac Trichim". Originating in Sabhal (Saul, County Down), the Uí Díchon were descended from Díchu mac Trichim, St. Patrick's first convert, and at some point in the 7th and 8th centuries, acquired the church of Druim Lethglaise near Dún De Lethglaise.
- Uí Domhnallain (O'Donnelan, Donnelan). Cited as being chiefs of Uí Tuírtri in the 11th century.
- Mac Duibheamhna, meaning "son of Dubheamhna", Dubheamhna itself according to Woulfe meaning "black-man of Emain (Macha)". Anglicised by O'Donovan as Devany. According to O'Dugan they were chiefs of Clanawley/Kinelawley, also known as Amhalgaidh Uí Morna and Uí Mughroin, in present-day County Down.
- Uí Duibhleachain (O'Doolan), chiefs of the Clan Breasail in an area near modern Kinelarty, County Down
- Mac Duinnshléibhe, meaning "son of Donn Sléibe mac Echdacha". Anglicised as MacDonlevy, Dunleavy, MacAleavey amongst other variations, they were the principle sept of the Dál Fiatach and monopolised the kingship of Ulaid. Migrated to present-day Donegal after de Courcy's conquest of Ulaid. After the Battle of Kinsale in 1602, the sept migrated to the province of Connacht, where their name is now most common. Some MacDonlevy's in Donegal adopted the surname Mac an Ultaigh, meaning "son of the Ulsterman", which was anglicised as MacAnulty and MacNulty.

== E ==
- Uí Eochagáin, meaning "descendant of Eochagáin", though was originally a Mac name. Anglicised as Geoghegan and Geoghagan. Some members of the sept became chiefs of Ulaid between the late-9th century and mid-10th century.
- Uí Erca Céin, based near Semne they were chiefs of Latharna in Dál nAraidi before being found later in Leth Cathail in central County Down.

== F ==
- Uí Fhloinn, meaning "descendants of Fhloinn mac Muiredach". Anglicised as O'Lynn, Lynn, Lind, Linn, Lynd, and Lindsay, they were chiefs of the Uí Tuirtri.
- Uí Fiachrach of Dún Da Én (Duneane, County Antrim) in Dál nAraidi.
- Síl Fingín, meaning the "seed of Fingín", a branch of the Uí Erca Céin who were chiefs of Latharna, and who twice held the over-kingship of Dál nAraidi.

== G ==
- Uí Gairbhith, meaning "descendant of Gairbhith" (rough peace). Anglicised as O'Garvey and Garvey. Kin of the Mac Aonghusa, they were located in County Down.
- Mac Gobhann (McGowan) of the Clanna Rory, who produced several of the over-kings of the Ulaid and who were expelled to Donegal by the English in the late 12th century.

== H ==
- Uí hAidith, meaning "descendant of Aidith" (humility). Anglicised as Haidy, Haidee, Heady, and Head. They were chiefs of Uí Eachach Coba from the mid-10th to mid-12th centuries, after which the Mag Aonghusa superseded them. The name is now incredibly rare, however still exists in County Mayo, Connacht.
- Uí hAinbheith/hAinbhith, meaning "descendant of Ainbhioth" (storm). Other Irish spellings include: Ó hAinfeith, Ó hAinfidh, Ó hAinfith. Anglicised as Hannaway, O'Hanvey, Hanvy, Hanvey, Hanafy, and Hanway amongst other variations. They were once chiefs of Uí Eachach Coba. Not to be confused with the different Airgíallan, Meath, or Connacht septs of the same name.
- Uí hEachaidh, meaning "son of Aghy". Anglicised variants include Haughey, MacGaughey, MacGahey, Hoey and Hoy. Also recorded as a Mac name. A branch of the Mac Duinnshléibhe, the name as Haughey is most common in counties Armagh and Donegal, as Hoey and Hoy in County Antrim, and as Haffey and Mehaffy in the Keady district of County Armagh.

== L ==
- Uí Labhradha, meaning "descendant of Labhradh" (spokesman). Anglicised as Lavery and Lowry. In the mid-10th century they were located around the Moira area of County Down where their name is still most common. They descend from Labhradh who was the father of Etru, chief of the Monagh.
- Uí Leathlobhair, meaning "descendant of Leathlobhar" (half-leper). Anglicised as O'Lalour, O'Lalor, Lawlor and Lawler amongst other variations. Descending from Leathlobhar who died in 871, the Ó Leathlobhair are mentioned in the Annals of Ulster as early 10th-century kings of Dál nAraidi before disappearing from the records. The existing family name is connected with the O’Moores of Leix, and they were listed as one of the ‘seven septs of Leix’.
- Uí Loingsigh, meaning "descendant of Loingseach" (mariner). Anglicised as Lynch, Lynchey, and Lindsey amongst other variations. The chiefs of the Ó Loingsigh were lords of Dál Riata during the 11th century, and chiefs of Dál nAraidi in the early 12th.
- Clann Luirgine, alias Clann Lurgan and Clann Lurcan. Descended from Fiacha Lurgan of Dál nAraidi.

== M ==
- Uí Mathghamhna/Mathúna, meaning "descendant of Mathghamhain" (bear). Anglicised as Mahon and MacMahon. Once a very powerful family in what is now County Down in the 11th and 12th centuries. Not to be confused with the different Airgíallan, Fermanagh or Connacht septs anglicised as Mahon/MacMahon.
- Cenél Maelche, alias Muilche and Monach. Either a sept of the Dál nAraidi or Dál Fiatach in either County Antrim or Down. Cerran mac Colmain is mentioned as a chieftain of this sept.
- "O'Moron".

== O ==
- Cenél nÓengusa, meaning "kindred of Óengus", descended from a son of Máel Cobo mac Fiachnai (died 647) who was a Dál Fiatach king of Ulaid. The Cenél nÓengusa threatened to be excluded from the kingship so Tommaltach mac Cathail (d. 789) tried to win the kinship of Ulaid from his relatives in the Dál Fiatach mainline. Having failed, Tommaltach was granted the territory of Leth Cathail, meaning "Cathal's half". By the 9th century the Cenél nÓengusa expanded their power northwards and pushed the Dál Fiatach mainline from their seat at Dún De Lethglaise to the territory of Dál mBuinne.

== S ==
- Corco Sogain, also spelt as Corcraige Sogain, meaning the "race of Sogain". They descended from Soghan Sal-bhuidhe, son of Fiacha Araidhe, eponymous ancestor of the Dál nAraidi.

== Bibliography ==
- Bell, Robert (2003). The Book of Ulster Surnames. The Blackstaff Press. ISBN 978-0-85640-602-7.
- Byrne, Francis John (2001). Irish Kings and High-Kings. Four Courts Press. ISBN 978-1-85182-196-9.
- Charles Edwards, T.M. (2000). Early Christian Ireland. Cambridge University Press. ISBN 978-0-521-36395-2.
- Dobbs, Margaret (1939). "The Ui Dercco Céin". Ulster Journal of Archaeology. Third Series. 2. Ulster Archaeological Society: 112–119.
- Keating, Geoffrey (1983). Keating's History of Ireland. Irish Genealogical Foundation. ISBN 978-0-686-44360-5.
- MacCotter, Paul. Medieval Ireland. Territorial, Political and Economic Divisions. Four Coirts Press. ISBN 978-1-84682-557-6.
