= Castlereagh Lower =

Castlereagh Lower An Caisleán Riabhach Íochtarach (Irish)
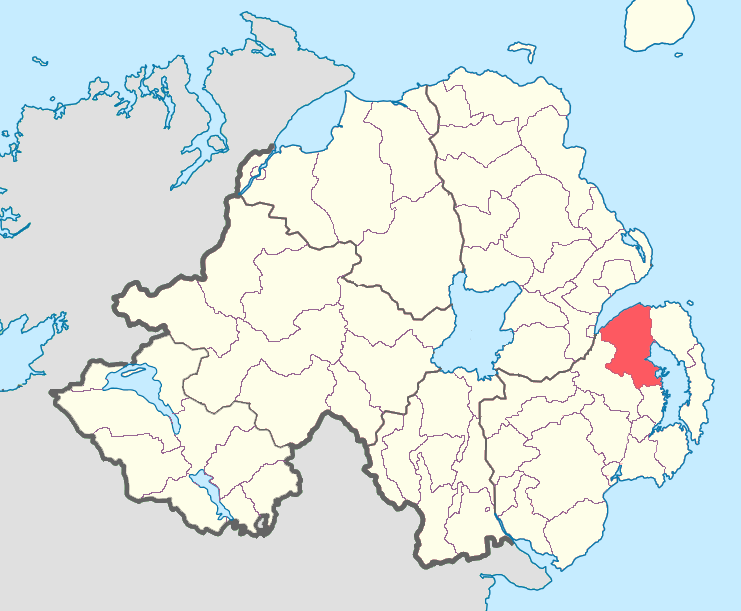
- Location of Castlereagh Lower, County Down, Northern Ireland.
- Sovereign state: United Kingdom
- Country: Northern Ireland
- County: Down

Castlereagh Lower (named after the former barony of Castlereagh) is a historic barony in County Down, Northern Ireland. It was created by 1841 with the division of Castlereagh into two. The barony roughly matches the former Gaelic territory of Uí Blathmaic, anglicized Blathewic. It is bordered by three other baronies: Ards Lower to the east; Dufferin to the south; and Castlereagh Upper to the west and south-west. Castlereagh Lower is also bounded by Belfast Lough to the north and Strangford Lough to the south-east.

== List of settlements ==
Below is a list of settlements in Castlereagh Lower:

=== Towns ===
- Bangor (also partly in barony of Ards Lower)
- Comber
- Holywood
- Newtownards (also partly in barony of Ards Lower)

=== Villages ===
- Ardmillan
- Ballygowan
- Crawfordsburn

=== Population centres ===
- Dundonald

== List of civil parishes ==
Below is a list of civil parishes in Castlereagh Lower:

- Bangor (also partly in barony of Ards Lower)
- Comber (also partly in barony of Castlereagh Upper)
- Dundonald
- Holywood
- Killinchy (also partly in baronies of Castlereagh Upper and Dufferin)
- Kilmood
- Knockbreda (also partly in barony of Castlereagh Upper)
- Newtownards (also partly in barony of Ards Lower)
- Tullynakill
