= Counties of Northern Ireland =

Former principal local government divisions of Northern Ireland

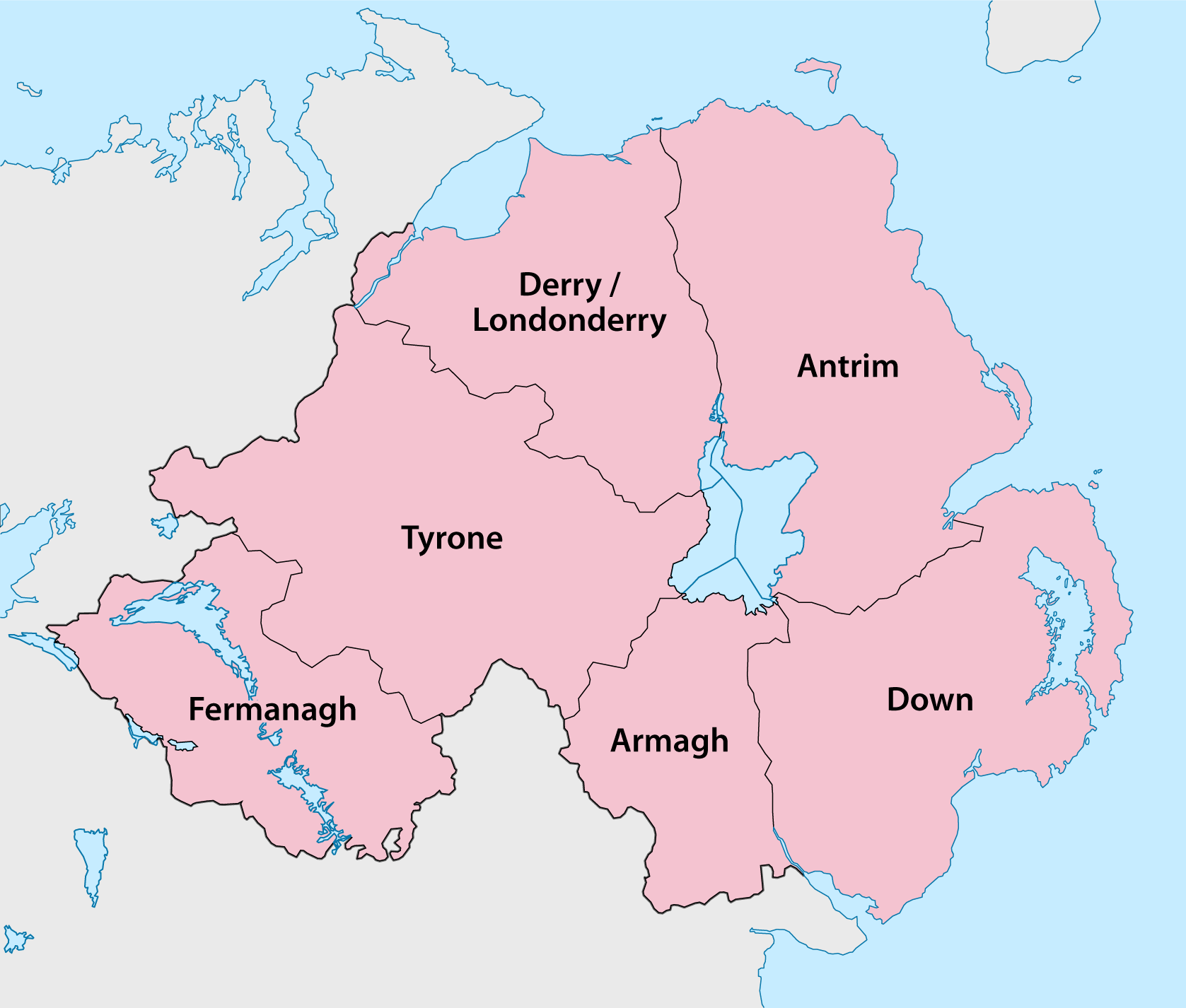
- Category: Former local government
- Location: Northern Ireland
- Number: Six
- Populations: 63,585 (Fermanagh); 651,321 (Antrim)
- Areas: 512 sq mi (1,330 km^{2}) (Armagh); 1,261 sq mi (3,270 km^{2}) (Tyrone)
- Government: Grand jury (to 1898) / County council (1899–1973)
- Subdivisions: County district (borough / urban district, rural district)

Northern Ireland is divided into six counties: Antrim, Armagh, Down, Fermanagh, Londonderry (Note: The county and city/county borough officially named Londonderry are often called Derry; see Derry/Londonderry name dispute.) and Tyrone. Six largely rural administrative counties based on these were among the eight primary local government areas of Northern Ireland from its 1921 creation until 1973. The other two local government areas were the urban county boroughs of Derry (geographically part of the County of Londonderry) and Belfast (geographically split between the counties of Antrim and Down).

The six counties date from the Kingdom of Ireland; five were created between 1570 and 1591 in the Tudor conquest of Ireland, while county Londonderry dates from 1613 and the Plantation of Ulster. The total number of counties in the island of Ireland is 32, with Northern Ireland and the Republic of Ireland often respectively called "the Six Counties" and "the Twenty-Six Counties", especially by Irish nationalists opposed to the partition of Ireland. The 1898–1973 administrative counties were subdivided into county districts. The two-tier county/district system was replaced with a single-tier of "districts", numbering 26 in 1973 and rationalised into 11 in 2015. The areas corresponding to the six counties and two county boroughs remain in use for some administrative purposes, and the six historic counties retain a popular identity.

== Counties ==
County	County town	Created	Area	Population (2021)	Notes
Antrim	Antrim	1570	308,645 hectares (762,680 acres) (Note: Antrim and Down areas are calculated by combining the administrative county areas with the areas of the wards of Belfast respectively west and east of the River Lagan as follows: 308,645 = 304,526 county Antrim + 4118.93 part of Belfast (all wards except Ormeau, Pottinger, Victoria); 248,905 = 246,624 county Down + 2281.23 part of Belfast (Ormeau, Pottinger, Victoria wards); 905.29 hectares of Belfast tidal area is excluded from both counties)	651,321	Formed after Shane O'Neill's rebellion. Lost North East Liberties of Coleraine in 1613. The namesake town of Antrim was never the administrative centre of the post-1570 county.
Armagh	Armagh	1571	132,698 hectares (327,900 acres)	194,394	Lost Slieve Foy to County Louth c.1630.
Down	Downpatrick	1570	248,905 hectares (615,060 acres)	553,261	Formed after Shane O'Neill's rebellion.
Fermanagh	Enniskillen	1588	185,097 hectares (457,380 acres)	63,585	Based on the territory of the Maguires.
Londonderry	Coleraine	1613	211,826 hectares (523,430 acres) (Note: 211,826 = 210,782 county plus 1,044 county borough.)	252,231	Merging of County Coleraine (formed 1603) with Loughinsholin (from Tyrone), North East Liberties of Coleraine (Antrim), and North West Liberties of Londonderry (Donegal).
Tyrone	Omagh	1591	326,550 hectares (806,900 acres)	188,383	Based on the Irish kingdom of Tír Eoghain. Lost Loughinsholin in 1613.

== Origins ==
The English administration in Ireland in the years following the Anglo-Norman invasion of Ireland created counties as the major subdivisions of an Irish province. This process lasted from the 13th to 17th centuries; however, the number and shape of the counties that would form the future Northern Ireland would not be defined until the Flight of the Earls allowed the shiring of Ulster from 1604. Each county would have an associated county town, with county courts of quarter sessions and assizes.

The area of the modern counties of Antrim and Down was the Earldom of Ulster based on John de Courcy's 1170s conquest of Gaelic Ulaid. Between the late 13th and early 14th centuries it was subdivided into multiple shires based around centres of Norman power such as Antrim, Carrickfergus, and Newtownards. The Bruce invasion (1315–18) saw the devastation of the Earldom of Ulster and its overlordship over the neighbouring Gaelic districts. With the murder of the last de Burgh earl in 1333, the resulting Gaelic recovery expanded Clandeboy and eroded the earldom's territory until by the 15th century only the areas of Carrickfergus and coastal enclaves in Down remained.

It was not until the reign of Queen Elizabeth I that Ulster would be shired into more counties. After the 1567 death and 1570 attainder of Shane O'Neill, much of Clandeboy was added to the surviving English enclaves to form the new counties of Antrim and Down, preparing for an abortive private English plantation. In 1584, Lord Deputy of Ireland Sir John Perrott created six counties in Ulster, based largely on the boundaries of existing lordships; four of the six are now Northern Ireland: Armagh, Coleraine, Fermanagh, and Tyrone. The noncooperation and later rebellion of Hugh O'Neill, Earl of Tyrone made Perrott's scheme largely notional until the Nine Years' War ended and the Flight of the Earls allowed the Plantation of Ulster to reinforce the county government. The County of the town of Carrickfergus remained separate from County Antrim until the Local Government (Ireland) Act 1898, which also promoted the boroughs of Belfast and Derry to county boroughs separate from the adjoining administrative counties.

Development of Northern Ireland's counties
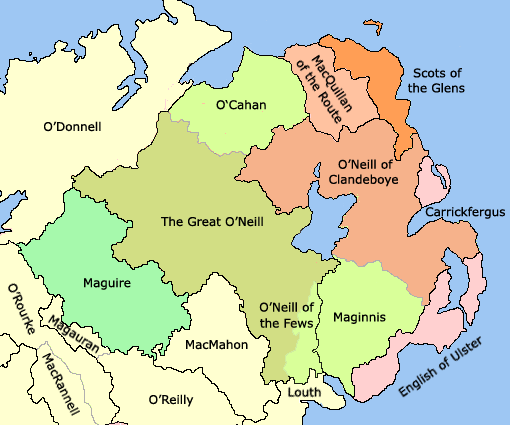
Later 15th century – Boundaries of counties and lordships (black border) and minor lordships (grey border) in Ulster.

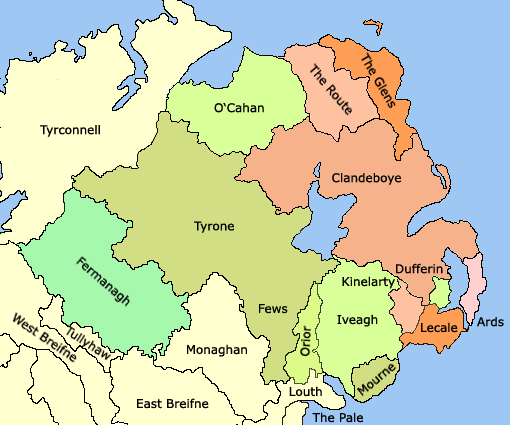
Early 16th century – General boundaries of lordships in Ulster.

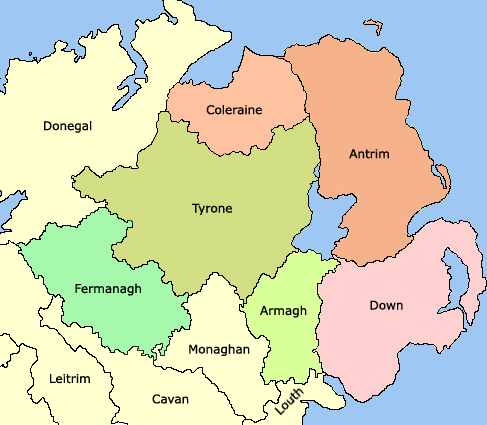
1584 – General boundaries of the counties of Ulster created by the Lord Deputy of Ireland Sir John Perrott.

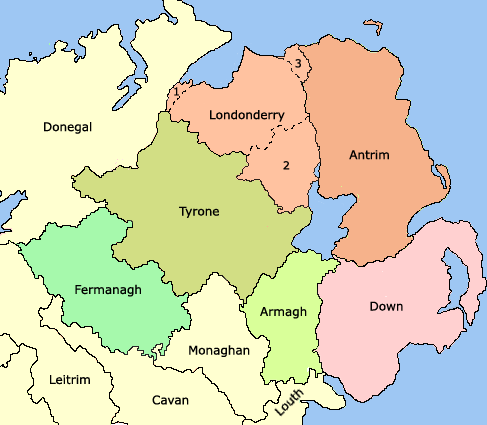
1613 – Ulster after the creation of County Londonderry, from the merger of County Coleraine, the North West Liberties of Londonderry (1), Loughinsholin (2), and North East Liberties of Coleraine (3).

== Baronies ==
Each county is divided into a number of baronies, midway between a county and a parish. Baronies are now obsolete as administrative units, partially derived from the territory of an Irish chieftain. By the time the process of turning local Irish kingdoms into baronies occurred throughout the whole of Ulster by the early 17th century as part of the Plantation of Ulster, it was already being used for taxation and administrative purposes.

Baronies were used for many records from the 17th to 19th centuries such as: the Civil Survey; Petty's Down Survey; the Books of Survey and Distribution; the 19th century valuation books and census returns. The Grand Jury representment system would also be based on the barony.

== Government and modern usage ==
The counties were also used as the administrative unit of local government introduced in Ireland under the 1898 Local Government Act along with county boroughs. In regards to Northern Ireland the cities of Belfast and Londonderry became county boroughs. The administrative counties and county boroughs were abolished as local government areas in Northern Ireland in 1972 and replaced with twenty-six unitary councils, many of which cross county boundaries.

The six administrative counties and two county boroughs remain in use for some purposes, including car number plates. The six counties were also used as postal counties by the Royal Mail for sorting purposes until their abolition in 1996. Outside government, the counties are used for cultural purposes, for example in the Gaelic Athletic Association.

== Lieutenancy areas ==
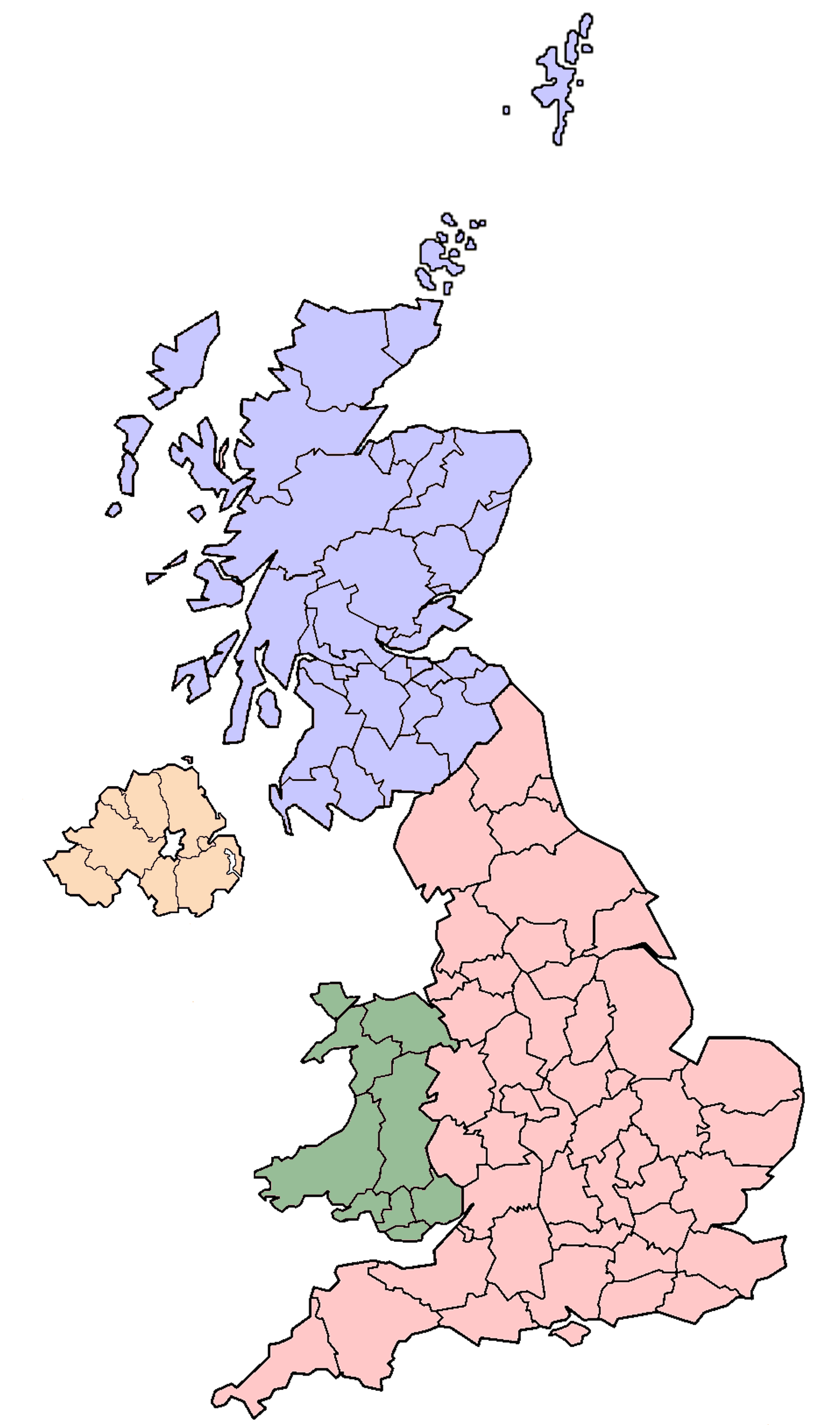
The lieutenancy areas of the UK, with NI shaded orange

Like the rest of the United Kingdom, Northern Ireland is divided into lieutenancy areas. These are areas that have an appointed Lord Lieutenant, who acts as the representative of the British monarch. Northern Ireland has eight lieutenancy areas, which are defined as the areas of the six counties and two county boroughs with the boundaries they had for local government purposes immediately prior to the local government reforms of 1973.

NI Lieutenancy Area	Current Lord Lieutenant	Year of Appointment
Lieutenancy of County Londonderry	Alison Millar	2018
Lieutenancy for the County Borough of Londonderry (in the City of Derry)	Ian Crowe	2023
Lieutenacy of County Down	Gawn Rowan Hamilton	2021
County Borough of Belfast Lieutenancy	Fionnuala Jay-O'Boyle	2014
Lieutenancy of County Armagh	Nicholas Alexander, 7th Earl of Caledon	1989
Lieutenancy of County Antrim	David McCorkell	2019
Lieutenancy of County Tyrone	Robert Lowry Scott	2009
Lieutenancy of County Fermanagh	Alan Brooke, 3rd Viscount Brookeborough	2012

== Former counties ==
Former counties which formed part of the six modern counties of Northern Ireland:

- County Coleraine formed from the territory of the O'Cahans in 1584 by Queen Elizabeth I, formed the basis of modern County Londonderry.
- Carrickfergus was formerly a county of itself, it extended further than the modern borough of Carrickfergus. It was merged into County Antrim in 1899.
- Antrim, Blathewyc, Cragferus, Coulrath, del Art, Dun, Ladcathel and Twescard, the seven counties that formed the Earldom of Ulster in 1333.
- In 1549, Ulster itself was called a county containing the baronies of Arde, Bentry, Dondalk, Dufferens, Gallagh, Grenecastle, Kroghfergous, Lacayall, Maulyn, Twscard, and Glyns.

== See also ==
- Counties of Ireland
- Counties of the United Kingdom
- List of Irish counties by area
- List of Irish counties by population
- List of Northern Ireland counties by highest point
- Local government in Northern Ireland
- Provinces of Ireland
