= Ards (territory) =

Coordinates: 54.531°N 5.526°W

Ards Aird Uladh(Irish)
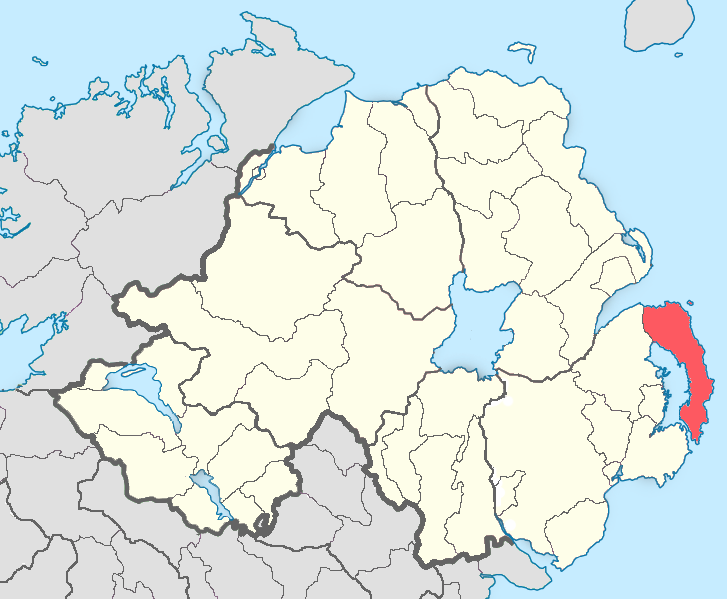
- Location of the former barony of Ards, County Down, in present-day Northern Ireland.
- Country: Ireland
- Province: Ulster
- County: Down

Ards (from Irish Aird Uladh, meaning 'peninsula of the Ulstermen') is the name of several different historical territorial divisions all located on the Ards Peninsula in modern-day County Down, Northern Ireland.

== Early history ==
Ards was once an ancient Irish district that was possessed by a tribe known as the Uí Echach Arda, and as such was known in the 7th and 8th centuries as Aird Ua nEchach, "peninsula of the Uí Echach", as well as na hArda (meaning "the Ards") in the 10th-century Lebor na Cert. This territory was part of the over-kingdom of Ulaid, and its inhabitants claimed to be descended from Eochaid Gonnat who was of the Dál Fiatach. After the power of the Uí Echach in Ards was destroyed by the Vikings in the early 9th-century, it simply became known as Aird Uladh, "peninsula of the Ulstermen". Ards was later possessed by the Mac Giolla Mhuire sept (English: Gilmore).

A small portion of the future barony located in the north-west consisting of parts of the modern parishes of Bangor and Newtownards belonged to a neighbouring district called Uí Blathmaic.

The Annals of the Four Masters record the Cenél nEógain as having made incursions into Ards in 1011 and 1130, plundering it both times. Around 1172, the battle of "Derry-Ceite" occurred between the king of Ulaid, Cooley O'Flathri, and Donnsleibhe of the Dál Fiatach, resulting in a slaughter of the people of Aird Uladh and Uí Blathmaic.

The Lebor na Cert stated that the king of na hArda had to pay stipends of: "Eight foreigners, eight fierce horses, Eight drinking-horns, eight cloaks with ring-clasps, and eight exquisitely beauteous ships.".

== County of Ards ==
With the invasion of Ulaid in 1177 by the Norman knight John de Courcy, and its subsequent conquest, the districts of Aird Uladh and Uí Blathmaic were combined to form a county, which was styled as "Comitatus de Arde" and "Comitatus Novae Villae". Its capital was at Nove Ville de Blathwyc (present-day Newtownards). This county was divided into two baronies, or bailiwicks: "Balliva del Art" and "Balliva de Blathewick". The county, spelt as "del Art", was noted in 1333 as being one of the seven that the Earldom of Ulster was divided into.

In 1345, Edward III, appointed Roberta de Halywode as sheriff of "Comitatus Nove Ville de Blawico". Henry IV in his first year (1399), appointed Robert Savage as sheriff of "de Arte in Ultonia".

== Barony of Ards ==
Towards the end of the 16th century, the barony appears to have been divided in two—"Great Ardes" and "Little Ardes". By 1851 the barony was divided into Ards Lower and Ards Upper, both of which did not correspond directly to the previous division of Ards, the difference being three parishes that were part of "Great Ardes" being placed under Ards Upper. The territory includes the lands of that part of the ancient barony of Ards known as Mid or Middle Ards, which is located in the north of Ards Upper. A distinction should be made between the administrative division of the barony, in terms of geographical area, and the proprietary division of the barony, in terms of segments having different owners. The barony of Ards was divided between three key proprietors in the 17th century, namely O'Brien, Hamilton and Montgomery, with a fourth part owned by the Savages. The Hamilton lands were later split between two co-heiresses, one of whom was married into the Ward family of Castle Ward, later the Viscounts Bangor of Castle Ward.
