= Knockbreda (civil parish) =

Civil parish in County Down, Northern Ireland

Knockbreda (Irish: An Cnoc agus An Bhréadach) is a civil parish in County Down, Northern Ireland. It is situated mainly in the historic barony of Castlereagh Upper, with 4 townlands in the barony of Castlereagh Lower.

== Settlements ==
The civil parish contains a number of areas now in Belfast:

- Ballymacarrett
- Braniel
- Cregagh
- Newtownbreda

== Townlands ==
The civil parish contains the following townlands:

- Ballydollaghan
- Ballylenaghan
- Ballymacarrett
- Ballymaconaghy
- Ballynafoy
- Ballyrushboy
- Braniel
- Breda
- Carnamuck
- Castlereagh
- Cregagh
- Galywally
- Gilnahirk
- Gortgrib
- Knock
- Knockbreckan
- Lisnabreeny
- Lisnasharragh
- Multyhogy
- Slatady
- Tullycarnet
- Queen's Island

== See also ==
- List of civil parishes of County Down
