= Holywood, County Down (civil parish) =

Civil parish in County Down, Northern Ireland

Holywood is a civil parish and townland (of 755 acres (306 ha)) in County Down, Northern Ireland. It is situated in the historic barony of Castlereagh Lower and covers some areas that are now in Belfast.

== Settlements ==
The civil parish contains the town of Holywood.

== Townlands ==
The civil parish contains the following townlands:

- Ballycloghan
- Ballycultraw
- Ballydavey
- Ballygrainey
- Ballyhackamore
- Ballykeel
- Ballymaghan
- Ballymenagh
- Ballymisert
- Ballyrobert
- Craigavad
- Holywood
- Killeen
- Knocknagoney
- Strandtown

== See also ==
- List of civil parishes of County Down
