= Kilmood =

Civil parish in County Down, Northern Ireland

Kilmood (Irish: Cill Modhiúid) is a civil parish in County Down, Northern Ireland. It is situated in the historic barony of Castlereagh Lower.

== Townlands ==
The civil parish contains the following townlands:

- Ballybunden and Kilmood
- Ballygraffan
- Ballykeel
- Ballyministragh
- Drumhirk
- Kilmood and Ballybunden
- Lisbarnet
- Tullynagee

== See also ==
- List of civil parishes of County Down
