= Lecale =

Peninsula in County Down, Northern Ireland

Coordinates: 54.30°N 5.65°W

Lecale Leath Cathail(Irish)
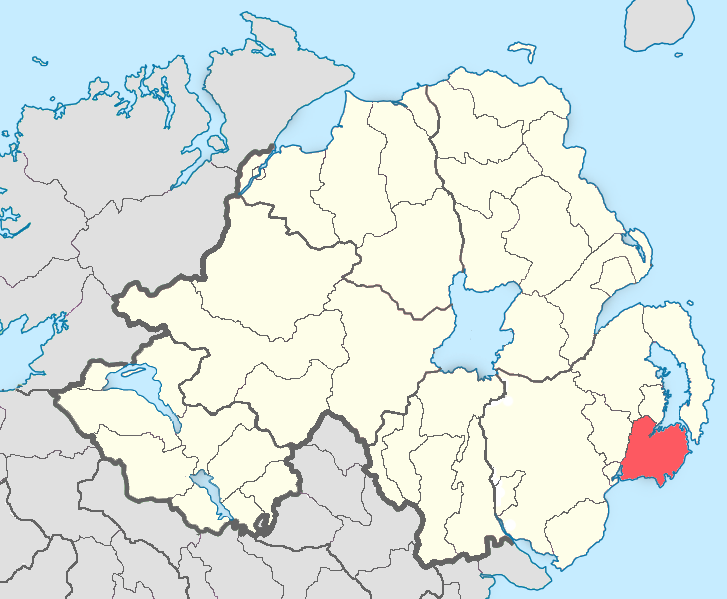
- Location of the former barony of Lecale, County Down, in present-day Northern Ireland. It was based on the Irish district of Leath Cathail
- Sovereign state: United Kingdom
- Country: Northern Ireland
- County: Down

Lecale (leh-KAHL, from Irish Leath Cathail 'Cathal's half') is a peninsula in the east of County Down, Northern Ireland. It lies between Strangford Lough and Dundrum Bay. In the Middle Ages it was a district or túath in the Gaelic Irish kingdom of Ulaid, then became a county in the Anglo-Norman Earldom of Ulster. Later it became a barony, which was split into Lecale Lower and Lecale Upper by 1851. Its largest settlement is the town of Downpatrick. Other settlements include Ardglass, Killough and Strangford. The peninsula has a high concentration of tower houses. Much of it is part of the 'Strangford and Lecale' Area of Outstanding Natural Beauty.

== History ==
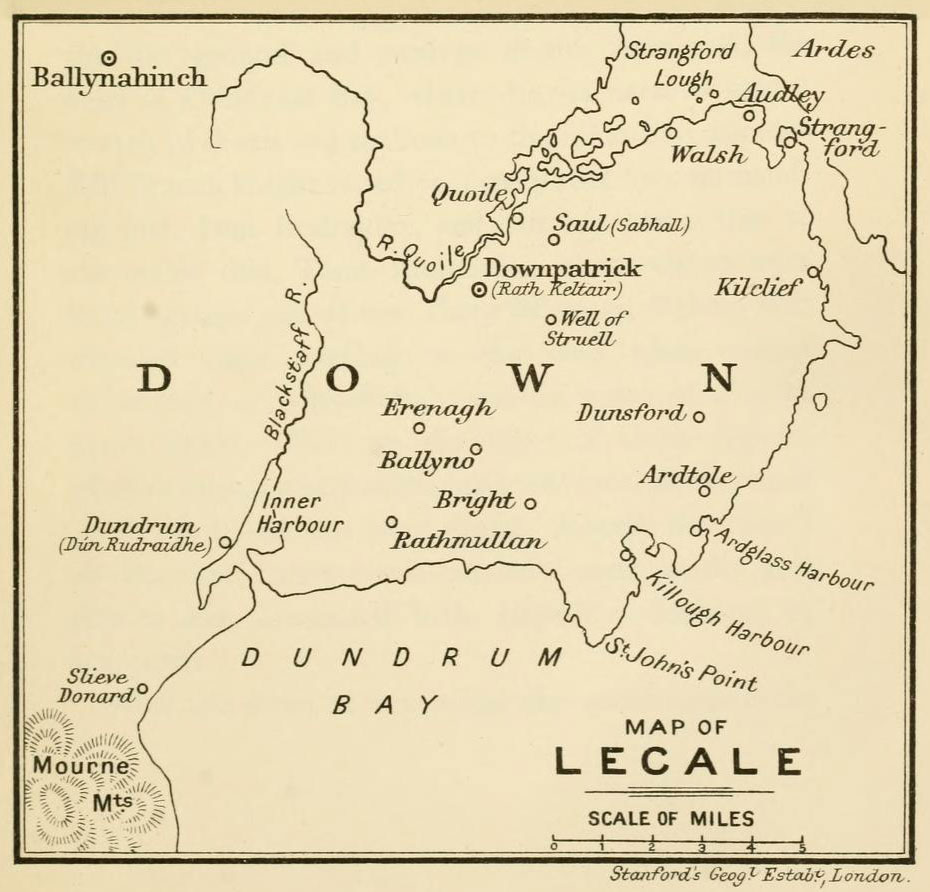
Historic map of Lecale by Alice Stopford Green (1912).

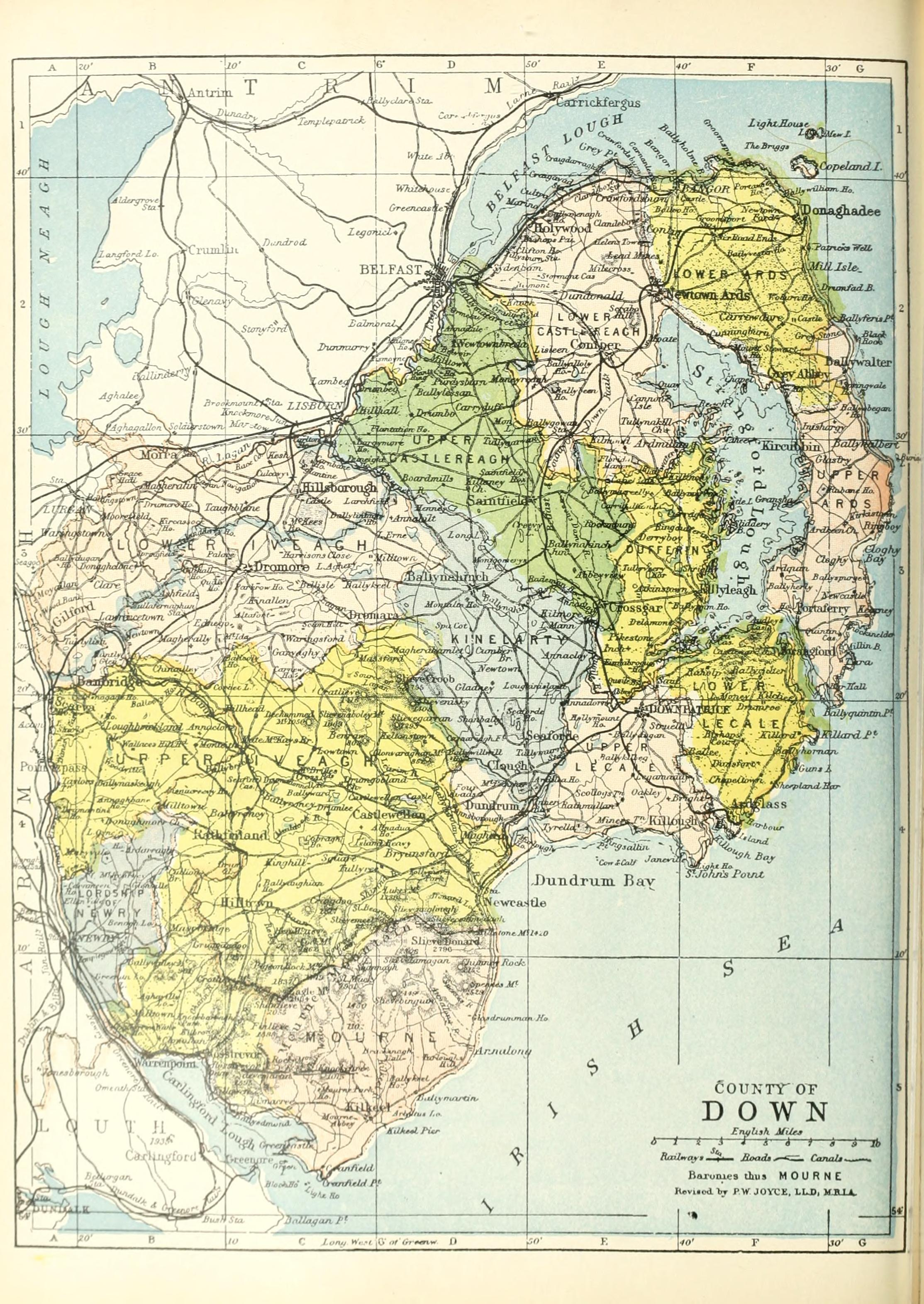
Map of Lecale within the surrounding baronies of County Down (1900).

=== Leath Cathail ===
Leath Cathail is said to consist of the present-day baronies of Lecale Lower and Lecale Upper, and was a subdivision of the ancient kingdom of Ulaid. It gets its name from Cathal, a prince of Ulaid about 700 A.D. who was a descendant of Fiachna, a son of Deaman, a king of Ulaid. Hence, Leath Cathail literally means "Cathal's half of Dál Fiatach".

More anciently Leath Cathail was known as Magh Inis, meaning the "island plain", with the name "Isle Lecale" still used in the area. These names reflect that until the first sea barriers and drainage systems were constructed about 200 years ago, that Lecale was almost entirely encircled by Dundrum Bay, Strangford Lough, and the Irish Sea.

The Cenél nÓengusa are noted as being kings of Leath Cathail, with the Ua Flathraoi cited as lords by the 12th century. According to the Annals of the Four Masters, on the day of the Festival of Paul and Peter (29 June) in 1147, the Ulaid gave battle to the Cenél nEógain of Tír Eoghain who had pursued them to the shores of Dún Droma (Dundrum Bay), Leath Cathail. The Ulaid suffered a heavy defeat, including the death of Árchú Ua Flathraoi, "lord of Leath-Chathail", with the victorious Cenél nEógain plundering Lecale and taking off with Ulidian hostages.

=== Dundrum ===
This Dún Droma ("fort of the ridge"), is now known as Dundrum, and is called Dún Droma Dairinne, the "fort of Dairinne's ridge", in a poem by Gilbride MacNamee, a bard of the Cenél nEóġain. This poem, written to lament the death of Bryan O'Neill, and the defeat of the Irish at the battle of Downpatrick in 1260, boasts of their victories over their enemies and makes mentions the victory over the Ulidians, however in reference to the battle of Downpatrick, the bard would lament "Alas! We have paid for it".

Dundrum Castle, which now occupies the original dún or earthen fort, is said to have been built for the Knights Templar by John de Courcy, and they are said to have held it until 1313 when their order was suppressed. It was afterward granted to the prior of Down.

=== Saints Patrick, Brigid and Colmcille ===
Saint Patrick landed at the Slaney estuary on his return to Ireland. A large granite statue of him looking into the rest of Ireland at Raholp today overlooks the site. He died at the Abbey of Saul where he began his mission and was administered his dying communion by Bishop Tassach of Raholp. His remains were carried to Downpatrick, then known as Dun Dhá Leath Glais, which lies within Lecale Upper.

Brigid of Kildare's relics were brought to Downpatrick for safekeeping from Danish plunderers in 835 and Saint Columba was brought here from Iona in 877. The frequent burning of Downpatrick caused them to be buried in the abbey yard and the site was forgotten about until 1185. Upon rediscovery John de Courcy had them reinstated in a tomb within the abbey on 9 June 1186 by Cardinal Vivian.

The abbey was desecrated by the Lord Deputy of Ireland, Leonard Grey in 1538. He was executed three years later for his callous actions. It appears that the relics of the saints remained intact until 1790 when the building was being remodelled as Down Cathedral. Accounts have given record that the tomb was vandalised and the relics were scattered over the abbey yard prompting the Downpatrick people to hurriedly bury them at their present site. The town cross was reportedly placed on the grave but it was carried off and vandalised. The Belfast Naturalists' Field Club erected the large granite slab over the grave in 1900 to protect the grave as it had become customary for those leaving Ireland to take soil from the grave with them.

=== Medieval and modern Lecale ===
The Earls of Kildare formerly held control of the customs of Strangford and Ardglass, both in Lecale Lower, of which it is noted that:

"The port offered excellent sea communications and the fertile area of Lecale was prosperous, so de Courcey incorporated the whole as part of the Pale and rewarded his followers with grants of land. Later, Henry VIII granted the revenue of the port, amounting to £5,000, to Gerald Fitzgerald, Earl of Kildare. The association of the Kildare family with Ardglass continued for three centuries"

Lecale is also recorded under the name of "Ladcathel" as one of the five counties of the Earldom of Ulster in 1226, the other four being Antrim, Carrickfergus, 'del Art' (Ards) and 'Blathewyc' (Newtownards). By 1333, Antrim and Carrickfergus were still counties, Twescard had been added, 'del Art' seems to have become a part of Blathewyc and Lecale had been replaced by Down. It was also the name of a former barony in Ireland, which by 1851 had been split into Lecale Lower and Lecale Upper.

The Russells of Downpatrick have been established in Lecale since the 12th century having been recorded in the area since Osberto Russell accompanied John de Courcy in 1177 into Ulster. Thomas Russell, one of the leaders of the United Irishmen who led the rising of 1803, was imprisoned in Downpatrick gaol and on 21 October 1803 was hanged at the gate of the gaol. "The Man From God Knows Where" is a ballad written by Florence Wilson in commemoration of him.

== Geography ==
Until 1745, when the first sea barriers were constructed by Edward Southwell, the sea encircled almost the whole of the area. This action saw the creation of the River Quoile and 500 acres (200 ha) of land around Downpatrick. Strangford Lough bounds the northern edge and the Irish Sea the east and Dundrum inner bay forms the western edge, with St. John's point forming its southern tip.

In 1967, a 3,108 ha (7,680 acres) area of the Lecale Peninsula, lying between the Mourne Mountains and Strangford Lough, was designated as the Lecale Coast Area of Outstanding Natural Beauty.

== See also ==
- Lecale Lower
- Lecale Upper
- Baronies of Ireland
