= Dufferin (barony) =

Coordinates: 54°30′N 5°45′W

Dufferin An Duifrian (Irish)
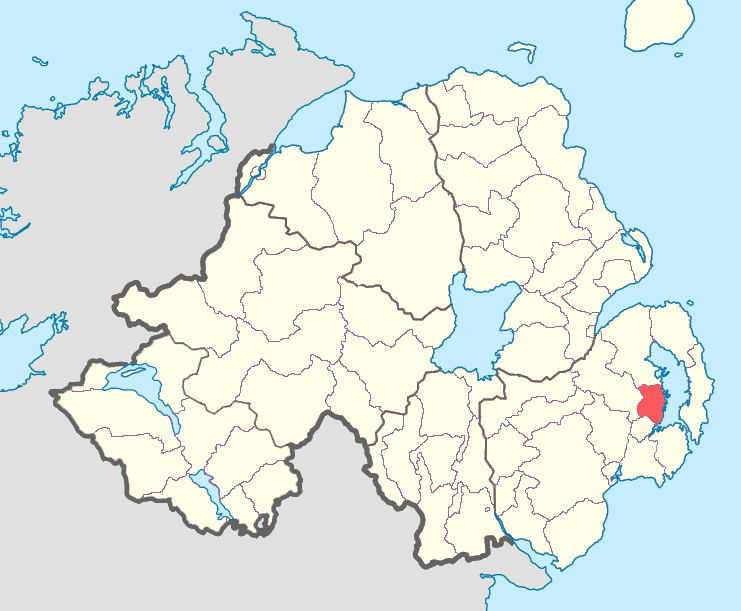
- Location of Dufferin, County Down, Northern Ireland.
- Sovereign state: United Kingdom
- Country: Northern Ireland
- County: Down

Dufferin (from Irish [A]n Duibhthrian, meaning 'the black third') is a historic barony in County Down, Northern Ireland. It is on the southern half of the west shore of Strangford Lough, and is bordered by three other baronies: Castlereagh Lower to the north; Castlereagh Upper to the west; and Lecale Lower to the south.

== History ==
Dufferin, along with the barony of Kinelarty and part of Castlereagh was at one time part of the territory of the Cenél Foghartaigh (Kinelarty), ruled by the Mac Artáin (MacCartan) sept. The Ó Labhradha (Lowry, Lavery) sept are also noted in Dufferin.

In the reign of Henry VIII the White family, who were originally from Flemington in County Meath, became Lords of the Manor of Dufferin. Patrick White (died 1561), the first of the White family to own Dufferin, was second Baron of the Court of Exchequer (Ireland). The Whites, although they were driven away for a time due to local disturbances, owned Dufferin until 1610, when they sold the barony to James Hamilton, 1st Viscount Claneboye.

Baron Dufferin and Claneboye, of Ballyleidy and Killyleagh in County Down, is a title in the Peerage of Ireland, created in 1800 for Dorcas Blackwood from Killyleagh, who was a direct descendant of the 1st Viscount Claneboye.

== Settlements ==
Below is a list of settlements in Dufferin:

- Killinchy
- Killyleagh

== Civil parishes ==
Below is a list of civil parishes in Dufferin:

- Killinchy (also partly in the baronies of Castlereagh Lower and Castlereagh Upper)
- Killyleagh (also partly in the barony of Castlereagh Upper)
