= Earldom of Ulster =

Anglo-Norman lordship

Arms of de Burgh, used as basis for the Ulster flag

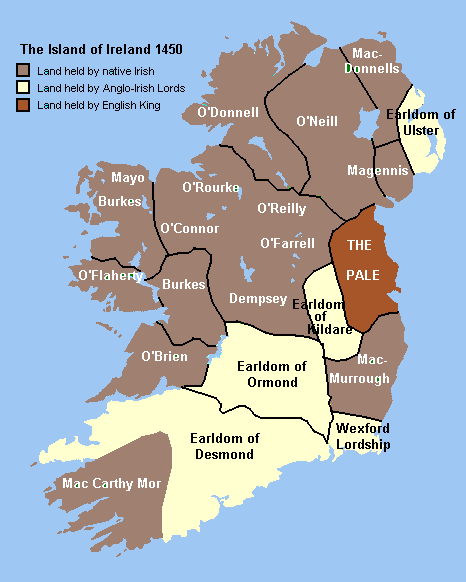
A map of Ireland in 1450

The Earldom of Ulster was an Anglo-Norman lordship in north-eastern Ireland during the Middle Ages, ruled by the Earls of Ulster and part of the Lordship of Ireland. The Norman knight John de Courcy invaded the Gaelic Irish kingdom of Ulaid in 1177 and conquered most of its territory over the following few years. In 1181 he was made earl palatine of Ulster by Henry II of England. The earldom was the most important Anglo-Norman lordship in the north of Ireland. It covered most of what are now the Ulster counties of Antrim and Down, and briefly extended west to Lough Foyle. Its capital was Carrickfergus Castle.

The Earldom of Ulster suffered heavily from the Bruce campaign in Ireland in the 1310s, from which it never recovered. By the 15th century the earldom was restricted to coastal enclaves in County Down and around Carrickfergus, and the title of Earl of Ulster passed to the Crown in 1461.

== De Courcy's invasion of Ulaid ==
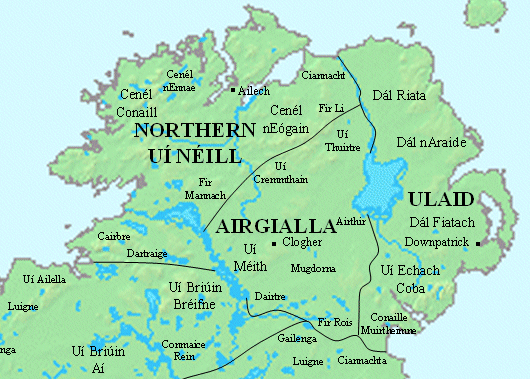
11th century major and minor kingdoms in Ulster prior to the arrival of the Normans in Ireland.

In 1175, after a period of fighting between the Normans and Irish, the Irish High King, Rory O'Conor sued for peace with King Henry II of England who agreed to a status quo allowing the Normans to consolidate their conquests in return for no more incursions into Gaelic territory. Henry's Norman vassals however remained restless. In 1176, John de Courcy came to Ireland and, around the start of 1177, went about carefully planning an invasion of Ulaid in eastern Ulster. Having acquired the approval of the royal governor in Dublin, de Courcy took 32 mailed horsemen and some 300-foot soldiers north into Meath, where he had obtained the right of passage through from its lord, de Lacy. He then met up with Irish allies who helped provide men and information for the invasion. De Courcy's force then advanced beyond the northern extent of Norman control and into Ulaid, reaching the petty-kingdom of Lecale having only set out from Dublin four days before. Until this, Ulaid had been untouched by "English" forces.

De Courcy's force advanced on Downpatrick, the chief seat of the Dál Fiatach dynasty who then ruled Ulaid. Despite the small size of his force, de Courcy's attack caught the Ulaid by surprise forcing the over-king of Ulaid, Rory MacDonleavy (Ruaidrí Mac Duinn Sléibe) to flee. The papal legate, Cardinal Vivian, had been on a visit to Ulster when this attack happened and he called for the withdrawal of de Courcy's forces, however this went unheeded.

About a week later, MacDunleavy returned to Downpatrick with a great host drawn from across Ulaid, however despite being vastly outnumbered, de Courcy's forces won the day. MacDonleavy followed up this attack with an even greater force made up a coalition of Ulster's powers that included the king of the Cenél nEógain, Máel Sechnaill Mac Lochlainn, and the chief prelates in the province. Again the Normans emerged victorious, even capturing the clergy involved included the Archbishop of Armagh, the Bishop of Down, and many of their relics.

Despite forming alliances, constant inter-warring amongst the Ulaid and against their Irish neighbours continued oblivious to the threat of the Normans. De Courcy would take advantage of this instability and from his base in Downpatrick set about conquering the neighbouring districts in Ulaid.

=== Expansion ===
Over the following year de Courcy, overly eager to extend his conquests, suffered several setbacks as the Irish managed to gain some victories. In one instance the Normans suffered a heavy defeat against the combined forces of MacDonleavy and Murrough O'Carroll of Airgíalla, which was soon followed up by another defeat further north at the hands of the Uí Thuirtri and Fír Lí, the aftermath of which saw the Normans having to fight their way some 30 miles back to de Courcy's castle on foot, outnumbered and constantly harried by the Irish.

Not all of Ulaid had fallen to de Courcy, the kingdom of Uíbh Eachach Cobha that was situated in central and western County Down, escaped conquest as did small areas here and there. The Normans rode through Eachach Coba (English: Iveagh) on their way from Dublin to Downpatrick, and the nature of their surprise attack suggests that the Eachach Coba had given support to, or at least assented to, de Courcy's plan. Subsequently, the Magennis clan that ruled Eachach Coba profited from trading with the Earldom of Ulster, and following its collapse in 1333 took over some of its lands to the east, and rebuilt Magennis Castle.

MacDonleavy continued to provide resistance to de Courcy, however Ulaid had been lost, and with it the balance of power in Ulster shifted. The success of de Courcy's invasion and ability to withstand the counter-attacks despite facing overwhelming odds is attributed to the military and technological superiority the Normans held in comparison to the Irish.

=== Consolidation ===
Throughout his domain, de Courcy built motte castles to establish a presence and stand guard at importance approaches. At least 128 mottes have been discovered in Ulster, the majority of which can be found in the area of greatest Norman presence; south County Antrim and north County Down. The mightiest castle that de Courcy would build was Carrickfergus Castle, which would eventually become his administrative center. He also built the castle of Rath, now known as Dundrum Castle, which stood guard over Lecale.

All of the conquests made by de Courcy had quick and easy access to the sea, which provided a vital lifeline for him and his forces when needed. In 1180, de Courcy married Affrica, the daughter of the Guðrøðr Óláfsson, King of the Isles, which allowed him to call upon a strong fleet further reinforcing his position.

Despite the initial opposition to the Normans, the Ulaid eventually seem to come to terms with their situation and even seek aid in resisting the increasing number of raids and attacks from the Northern Uí Néill. An example of which is in 1182, when an alliance between de Courcy and the Ulaid saw the defeat of an incursion by the Ó Doibhilin (Devlin) sept of the Northern Uí Néill.

According to the Annals of the Four Masters:

- In 1182, Domhnall mac Aodha Mac Lochlainn of the Northern Uí Néill, took an army to Dunboe in Fir na Craoibhe (eastern County Londonderry) to fight the Foreigners, however they were defeated with many Gaelic nobles killed.

Having committed crimes against the Church and its servants in his conquest of Ulaid, de Courcy set about making amends by granting land to the Church and establishing abbeys. He renamed Dun-da-lethglas Downpatrick after Saint Patrick, and granted it to the Church, and had the alleged remains of saints Patrick, Brigid, and Colmcille, transferred there.

For a quarter of a century, de Courcy ruled his domain like an independent king, styling himself princeps Ultoniae, "master of Ulster". He administered his own justice and even minted his own halfpennies and farthings. He was also described as "prince of the Ulster people" and in his arrest-warrant, was called by John, King of England, "King of all the barons of Ulster".

=== Incursions against the Northern Uí Néill ===
In 1197 John De Courcy's brother, Jordan, was killed by one of his Irish attendants and as revenge John attacked various Irish petty-kings. In this he was aided by Duncan, Earl of Carrick, who was the cousin of his wife Affreca.

John led his army across the River Bann at Eas Craoibhe (the Salmon Leap, in modern-day Coleraine, County Londonderry), in Fir na Craoibhe, where they founded the castle of Kilsanctan. They then laid waste to the neighbouring territory of Cianachta. From the castle in Kilsanctan, Rotsel Piton (Peyton), who had been left in charge of a large force, set forth to plunder the surrounding territories and churches, going as far as the harbour at Derry. The Northern Uí Néill king, Flaithbertach Ó Mael Doraidh (Flaherty O'Muldory) of the Cenél Conaill, took a force and engaged Piton on the strand at Faughanvale resulting in a slaughter of the English as well as the death of a son of Ardgal Mac Lachlainn—of the ruling dynasty of the Cenél nEógain, rivals of the Cenél Conaill—who was on the side of the English.

As reward for his help, Duncan was rewarded a sizeable portion of the territory subjugated from the Irish, stated as being along the northern coastline of present-day counties Antrim and Londonderry.

From the death of Muirchertach Mac Lochlainn (Murtough Mac Loughlin), king of the Cenél nEógain, over-king of the Northern Uí Néill, as well as High King of Ireland, in 1166, the Northern Uí Néill had been ruled by Flaithbertach Ó Mael Doraidh of the Cenél Conaill. During the same time the Cenél nEógain had had eight kings all of which had died violently, either in conflict with the Cenél Conaill or amongst themselves. Adding to the mix was the ascendancy of the Uí Neill (O'Neill) sept to the kingship of Cenél nEógain in place of the Mac Lachlainn's.

Upon the death of Flaithbertach Ó Mael Doraidh in 1197, Echmarcach Ua Dochartaigh (O'Doherty) of the Cenél Conaill ascended to the kingship of the Cenél Conaill and Northern Uí Néill. With the death of Ó Mael Doraidh, de Courcy launched an expedition to Derry and camped there for five nights. Ua Dochartaigh attacked him however he was killed and his force defeated enabling de Courcy to plunder all the cattle of Inishowen. Two years later in 1199, de Courcy returned to Derry and plundered the surrounding countryside for a considerable amount of time until Aedh O'Neill of the Cenél nEógain led a counter-attack by sea at Larne in de Courcy's own territory.

In 1200 and 1204 de Courcy launched raids into the Cenél nEógain's territory, Tír Eoghain, however these were futile, the last battle of which was led by Dermot Mac Lachlainn, who was killed. It seems pretty evident that de Courcy was aiding the Mac Lachlainn's in their claim to the kingship of Cenél nEógain and as such received their aid in attacking their principle rivals and enemies, the Uí Neill's and Cenél Conaill.

== The De Burgh era (1263-1363) ==
In 1263, Walter de Burgh was granted the Earldom.

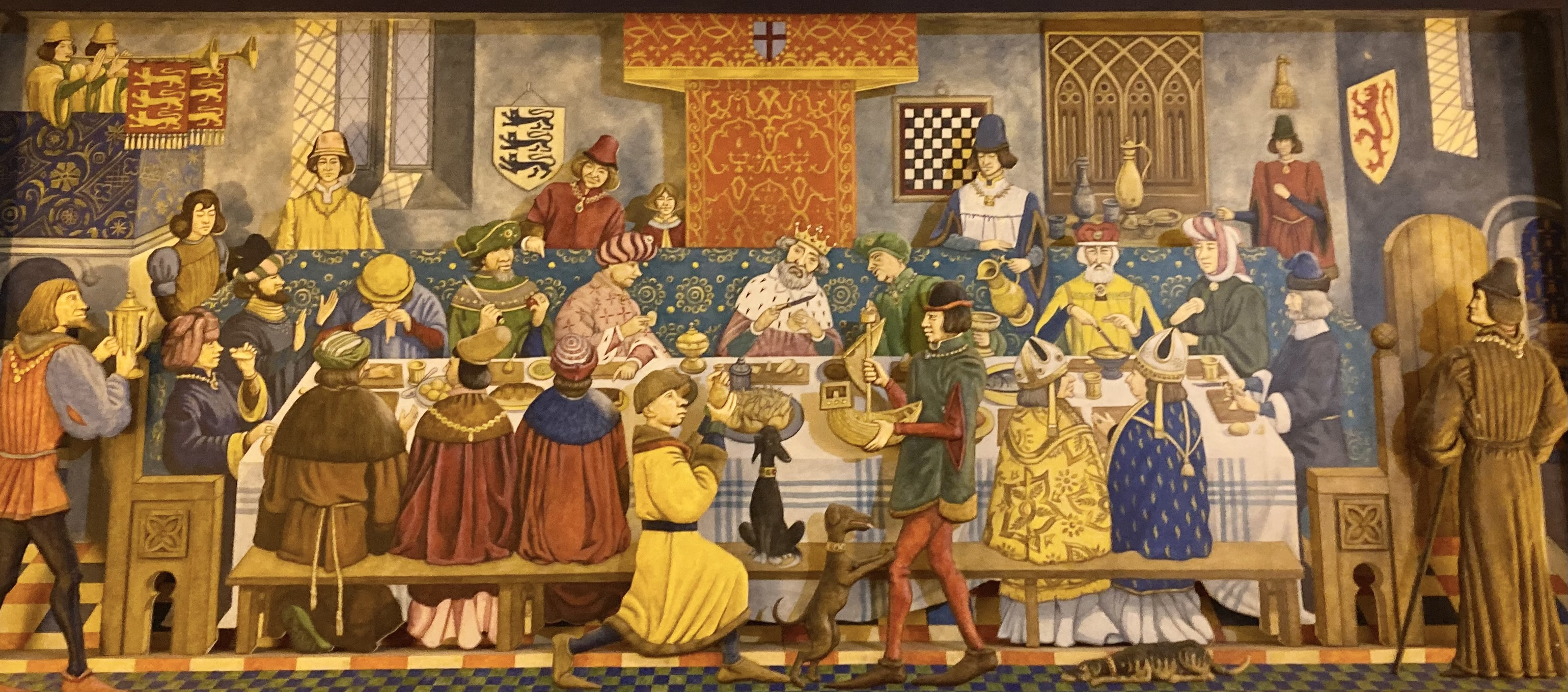
A modern artwork from Carrickfergus Castle, depicting a feast in the castle during the De Burgh era.

The age of the de Burghs was a relatively peaceful and prosperous time for the Earldom of Ulster, the peace only ending with a siege of Carrickfergus Castle by Edward Bruce in 1315. The Earls of Ulster owned an extensive estate and were responsible for justice in their earldom. Feasting, entertainment, and hunting were all common during this time. Earl Richard de Burghs’ children married into the most important families in England, Scotland, and the Lordship of Ireland: Robert Bruce, King of Scots and the Earls of Gloucester, Kildare, Desmond and Louth were his sons-in-law. Carrickfergus was a centre of trade and commerce, drawing merchants from all across Western Europe.

== See also ==
- Earl of Ulster
- Hugh de Lacy, 1st Earl of Ulster
- Walter de Burgh, 1st Earl of Ulster
- House of Burgh
- Carrickfergus
- Lecale
- Twescard

== Bibliography ==
- Connolly, S.J. (2007). Oxford Companion to Irish History. Oxford University Press. ISBN 978-0-19-923483-7.
- Bardon, Jonathan (2005). A History of Ulster. The Blackstaff Press. ISBN 0-85640-764-X.
- Adamson, Ian (1998). Dalaradia, Kingdom of the Cruithin. Pretani Press. ISBN 094886825-2.
- Orpen, Goddard H. (1915). The Normans in Tirowen and Tirconnell. Royal Society of Antiquaries of Ireland.
