= Archibald Warwick =

Irish Republican (1769–1798)

- Born: c. 1769
- Died: 15 October 1798 (aged 29); Kircubbin, County Down, Ireland
- Cause of death: Executed by hanging
- Resting place: Movilla Cemetery, Newtownards
- Other name: William Warwick
- Education: Glasgow University
- Occupation: Licentiate
- Organization: Society of the United Irishmen

Ecclesiastical career
- Religion: Presbyterianism
- Church: Presbyterian Church in Ireland
- Congregations: Kircubbin Presbyterian Church
- Military career
- Allegiance: United Irishmen
- Unit: Lower Ards contingent
- Conflicts: Irish Rebellion of 1798: Attack on Portaferry

Archibald Warwick (c. 1769 – 15 October 1798) was a Presbyterian licentiate and member of the United Irishmen from Kircubbin, County Down who was executed for participating in the Irish Rebellion of 1798.

== Early life ==
Archibald Warwick was the son of John Warwick and Elizabeth Gordon. His family were all from Loughriscouse outside Newtownards, County Down.

Warwick attended Glasgow University, where liberal Presbyterian Francis Hutcheson instilled students with a liberal, democratic and anti-slavery philosophy.

At the outbreak of the 1798 rebellion, Warwick was a probationer training to be a Presbyterian Minister, and while awaiting to assigned to a parish was a licentiate at Kircubbin Presbyterian Church.

== 1798 Rebellion ==
Warwick and other clergymen such as James Porter, Thomas Ledlie Birch, and William Steele Dickson became key figures in the United Irishmen. Warwick was the leader of the Lower Ards contingent of the United Irishmen. Warwick, having raised a force at Kircubbin and Innishargie, led an attack on the Yeomanry garrison in Portaferry on 10 June 1798, which was that was repulsed through musket fire and canon fire from an anchored revenue cutter in the Strangford Lough. Following the attack they retreated to their camp at Inishargie, with the Portaferry garrison later also retreating across the lough to Strangford and then Downpatrick after having deemed their position to be untenable.

Like others in the United Irishmen, Warwick denounced Lord Castlereagh and his father, as "renegade apostates", asserting that they betrayed their liberal beginnings and philosophy by assisting in suppressing the rebellion.

== Death and legacy ==
Following the rebellion, Warwick's name (mistakenly prefixed with reverend by authorities) appeared among the most wanted of the rebels, and a month after the end of the rebellion he was captured. On 15 August 1798, Warwick was brought before a court-martial, and despite weak and contradictory evidence, was convicted of ‘acting as a traitor and rebel and endeavouring to excite treason and rebellion in Ireland’. Warwick's death sentence was not carried out immediately, with him being imprisoned instead in Newtownards Gaol for 2 months, raising expectations that he may be given a reprieve. On 15 October 1798, he was publicly executed by hanging in Kircubbin beside the Presbyterian Meeting House. His execution in front of his congregation was to stand as a warning against further rebellion in the Ards peninsula. Warwick was one of seven licentiates to be found guilty of treason, and one of two probationers to receive capital punishment.

He is buried in Movilla cemetery in Newtownards.

Warwick is sometimes erroneously referred to as William or James Warwick due to errors in historical publications or accounts. The character of William Warwick in W. G. Lyttle's Betsy Gray (about the folklore figure) is based on Archibald Warwick. Warwick's execution also appeared in Florence Wilson’s much-recited poem ‘The Man from God Knows Where’.
