= Copeland Islands =

Three islands off the coast of County Down, Northern Ireland

Oileáin Chóplainn
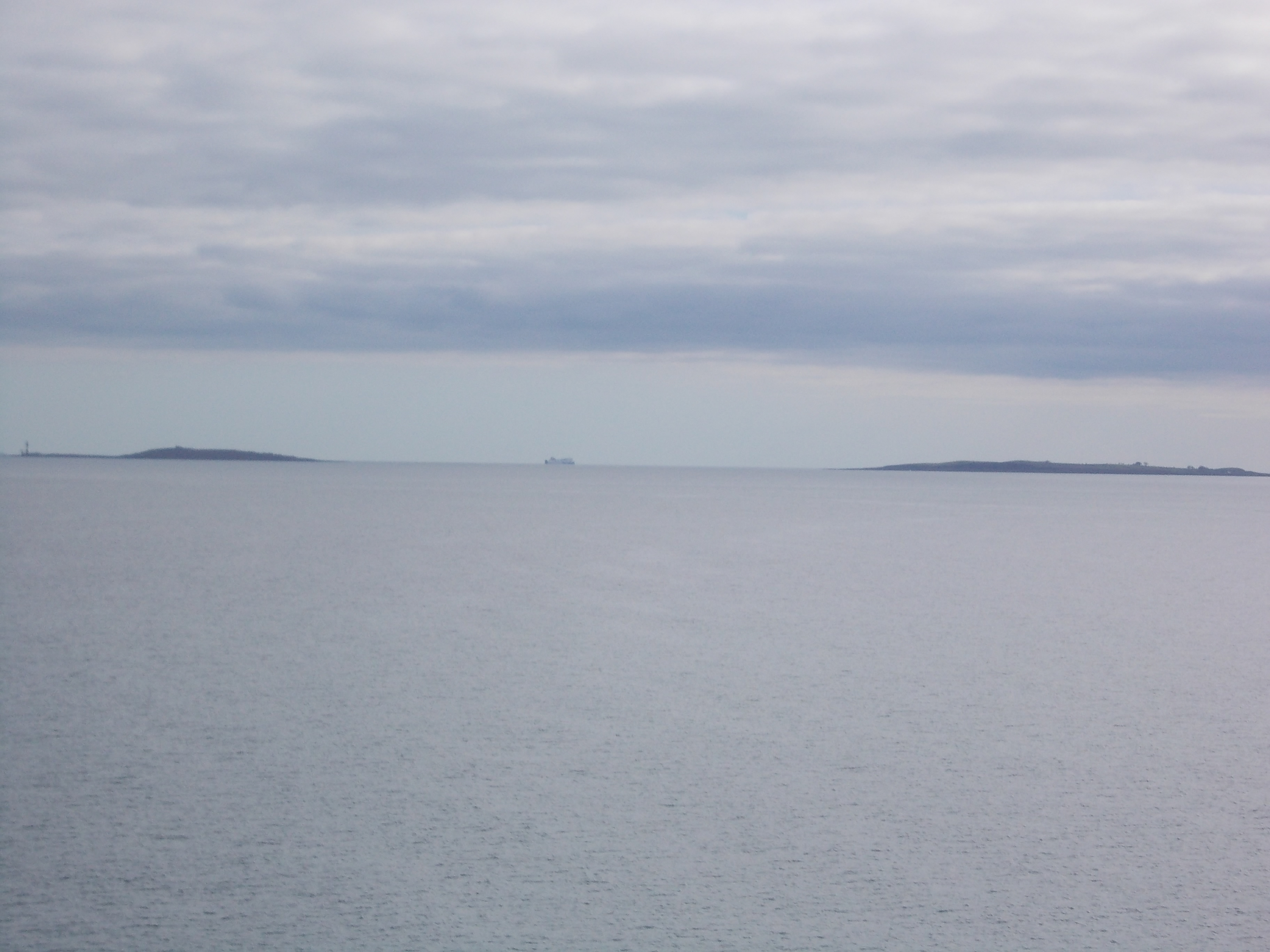
- The Copeland Islands seen from a ferry

- Location within County Down Location within Northern Ireland Location within island of Ireland
- Etymology: Named from the de Coupland family, or from Old Norse Kaupmanneyjar, "merchant islands"

Geography
- Location: North Channel
- Coordinates: 54°40′29″N 5°31′44″W
- Archipelago: Offshore islands of Ireland
- Total islands: 3
- Major islands: Lighthouse Island, Copeland Island, Mew Island
- Area: 392.25 acres (158.74 ha)

Administration
- United Kingdom
- Constituent country: Northern Ireland
- County: County Down

Demographics
- Population: 0

Additional information
- Time zone: GMT (UTC±0)
  - Summer (DST): BST (UTC+1)

The Copeland Islands is a group of three islands in the north Irish Sea, north of Donaghadee, County Down, Northern Ireland, consisting of Lighthouse Island (also known as Old Island), Copeland Island (also known as Big Island) and Mew Island. They lie within the civil parish of Bangor.

Along with Lambay Island and Ireland's Eye off County Dublin, the islands are the only other one of the 258 sometime inhabited islands of Ireland which lie on the east coast.

== Etymology ==
The Copeland Islands most likely derive their name from the de Coupland family, who settled in the Newtownards area, at the northern end of the Ards Peninsula, along with other Normans in the 12th century. This family also lent their name to other landmarks in the vicinity such as Copeland Water near Carrickfergus and the townland of Ballycopeland in the civil parish of Donaghadee.

The earliest possible recorded name for the islands, however, may be the Old Norse Kaupmanneyjar (kaupmann meaning 'merchant' and ey meaning 'island'), recorded in the Norse Hakonar Saga Gamla, and dated to 1230. It has been suggested that 'Kaupmann' developed into 'Copman' and then into 'Copeland', with the form 'Copman' recorded several times in the late 16th century in reference to the islands.

The original Irish name for the islands is unknown. However, it has been suggested that the 1570s usage of 'Helaine Harr[o]n[e]' may be an attempt at Anglicising the Irish name Oileáin Árann (island of the (kidney-shaped) ridge). The modern Irish name, however, is a Gaelicisation of Copeland Islands into Oileáin Chóplainn.

== History ==
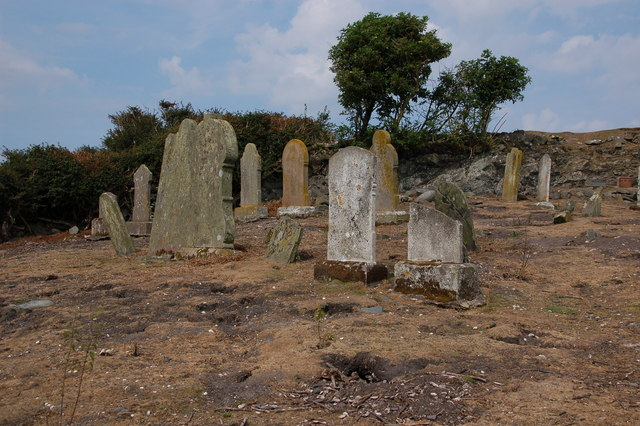
The old kirkyard (graveyard) on Copeland Island, also known as Big Island.

There are three islands included in the Copeland Islands: the Great Copeland Island (also known as Big Island or Copeland Island), the Lighthouse Island (also known as Old Island), which does not have a lighthouse now, and Mew Island, which does have a lighthouse. Over a century ago, Lighthouse Island had a population of about 100, including a school master with 28 pupils.

In 1671, James Ross obtained a fee farm grant of the islands, and in 1770 David Kerr bought them from The 2nd Earl of Clanbrassil (by the second creation). As the islands were a danger to ships, a light beacon was made on Lighthouse Island (also known as Old Island or Cross Island) in about 1715; it burned over 400 tons of coal every year. In 1796, the new British and Irish Lighthouse Board announced the erection of oil lamps and, in 1813, the new lighthouse was built. In 1884, a new lighthouse was built on Mew Island. In 1954, the Bird Observatory was established by Arnold Benington.

Hans Sloane visited the islands and noted how the sea wrens [sic] laid their eggs on the ground so thick that they had difficulty in passing along without treading on them while the birds screamed overhead.

Until the 20th century, the islands were used by smugglers who brought tobacco and spirits through the islands and into County Down.

== Area of Special Scientific Interest (ASSI) ==
Copeland Islands ASSI is located off the County Down coast of Northern Ireland and comprises The Great Copeland, Lighthouse Island and Mew Island. The islands are important sites for breeding seabirds and waders, in addition to their coastal plant communities and geological features.

Big Copeland supports the most diverse range of habitats of the three islands. Communities influenced by the sea are found around the shore with maritime cliff vegetation and pockets of salt marsh also present. The centre of the island is occupied by semi-improved wet grassland with frequent areas of marsh.

== Flora ==
The vegetation on Light House Island consists of short rabbit grazed turf with large areas of rank bracken (Pteridium aquilinum) and Himalayan balsam (Impatiens glandulifera). Notable species include English stonecrop (Sedum anglicum), rock sea-spurrey (Spergularia rupicola), Scots lovage (Ligusticum scoticum) and sea purslane (Halimione portulacoides). Lighthouse Island represents the southern limit for Scots lovage in Europe and the northern limit for sea purslane in Ireland. Other plants on the islands include Hyacinthoides non-scripta, Hyacinthoides hispanica, Dactylorhiza purpurella and Centaurium erythraea.

Mew Island is dominated by rank stands of grass and bracken but, as on all the islands, notable areas of inter-tidal and exposed rock habitat are present.

=== Algae ===
The marine algae of the Lighthouse Island and the Mew Islands was studied in 1975 and the 56 species, or genera, identified were listed and published.

=== Lichens ===
Nineteen species of lichens were collected in 1984, the identifications were confirmed or corrected by Dr A Fletcher. As far as is known these are the only records of lichens from the Lighthouse Island.

- Lecanora atra (Huds.) Ach.
- Lecanora gangaleoides (Nyl.)
- Ochrolechia parella (L.) Massel
- Parmelia caperata (L.) Ach.
- Ramalina siliquosa (Huds.) A.L.Sm.
- Xanthoria parietina (L.) Th. Fr.
- Anaptychia fusca (Huds.) Vainio
- Diplotomma chlorophaeum (Hepp ex Mull.Argh.) Szat.
- Lecanora ploytropa (Hoffm.) Rabenh.
- Lecanora rupicola (L.) Zahlbr.
- Lecidella subincongrua (Nyl.) Hertel and Luckert
- Ochrolechia parella (L.) Massel
- Parmelia sulcata Taylor
- Polysporina simplex (Davies) Vezda
- Rhizocarpon constrictum Malme
- Rhizocarpon geographicum (L.) DC
- Verrucaria ditmarsica Erichen
- Verrucaria maura Wahlenb.

== Fauna ==
The islands are internationally important sites for breeding populations of Manx shearwater and Arctic tern and nationally important sites for breeding Mediterranean gull, common gull and common eider. The Manx shearwater colony on Copeland Islands holds more than 1.7% of the world population. The colony is in excess of four thousand pairs. The rabbit populations on the islands play an important role in the breeding success of the Manx shearwater as the latter mainly nest in the rabbit burrows that honeycomb the islands. Grazing by rabbits maintains a short sward, which is desirable for the fledglings.

Great Copeland has an internationally important Arctic tern colony, with some 550 pairs. The site now represents the largest colony for this species in Ireland. Mew Island has been an important tern colony in the past and it is hoped that positive management will encourage terns to become re-established. The islands are the most important breeding sites in Northern Ireland for common gull with over 250 pairs present. Big Copeland has recently held Northern Ireland's first successful breeding pair of Mediterranean gull. The islands are home to a nationally important population of breeding eider duck. In total the three islands account for 14% of the Irish population. Non-breeding eider form part of the nationally important population that occurs along the Outer Ards coast and Belfast Lough areas.

Other breeding colonies of note include black guillemot, water rail and stock dove. The latter species has suffered a dramatic decline in Northern Ireland, but numbers have increased on Copeland with some 100 pairs now breeding. Breeding waders such as lapwing and snipe may be found further inland. Here the taller vegetation, interspersed with open areas, provides an ideal breeding habitat. Birds of prey favour the islands when the breeding season is over. Hen harrier, sparrowhawk, buzzard, kestrel, merlin and peregrine falcon are all seen regularly.

Mammals, such as the grey seal, common seal, harbour porpoise, bottlenose dolphin, common minke whale, common dolphin and otter have been reported from the Copeland Islands.

Lepidoptera have also been recorded. 19 species of butterflies, 31 species of macro-Lepidoptera and three species of micro-Lepidoptera.

A beetle new to Northern Ireland was recorded in 2013: Diplapion confluens (Kirby).

== Lighthouses ==
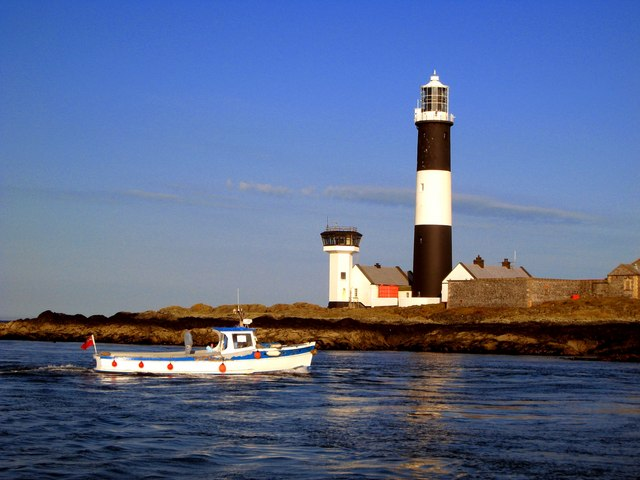
Mew Island Lighthouse

A light station was established on Lighthouse Island in the early 18th century and a lighthouse built in 1815. It has been inactive since 1884, when the lighthouse was abandoned in favour of the Mew Island Lighthouse, but the ruined stump of the 16 m (52 ft) stone tower remains. The ruins of the keeper's house have been rebuilt to house a bird observatory. The island is now owned by the National Trust and operated by the volunteer members of the Copeland Bird Observatory.

The Mew Island Lighthouse is currently active, and was converted to automatic operation with the lighthouse keepers permanently withdrawn in 1996.

== Princess Victoria ferry disaster ==
On 31 January 1953, Princess Victoria, a British Transport Commission ferry sailing from Stranraer to Larne, sank off the Copeland Islands in a heavy storm with the loss of 135 lives.

== See also ==
- Rathlin Island – an inhabited island off the north coast of County Antrim
