= Ballyblack =

Townland in County Down, Northern Ireland

Coordinates: 54.5808°N 5.6169°W

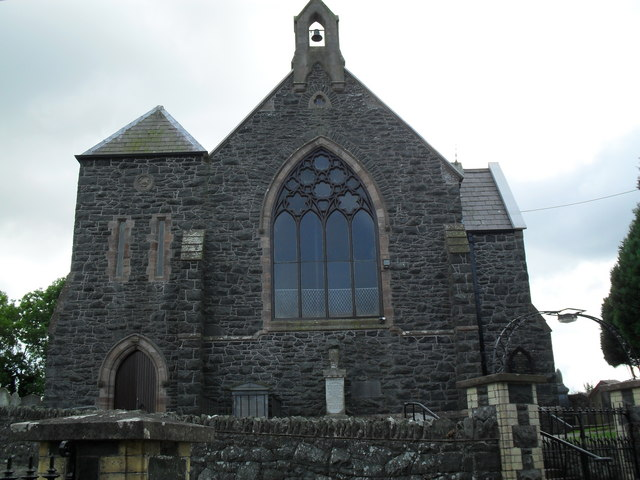
Ballyblack Presbyterian Church is in the barony of Ards Lower

Ballyblack is a rural area in the Ards Peninsula of County Down, Northern Ireland, approximately 4 miles southeast of the town of Newtownards. Located in the barony of Ards Lower, Ballyblack townland spans the civil parish of Greyabbey and civil parish of Newtownards. According to PlacenamesNI.org, the name Ballyblack originates from "Baile Bhleaic" meaning Black's townland.

The churchyard of Ballyblack Presbyterian Church, located in the townland, dates to the mid-19th century.
