= Ballyhay =

Townland in County Down, Northern Ireland

Coordinates: 54°37′20″N 5°35′02″W

Ballyhay: Irish: Baile Hae
- Townland
- Location within County Down
- County: County Down
- Country: Northern Ireland
- Sovereign state: United Kingdom
- Police: Northern Ireland
- Fire: Northern Ireland
- Ambulance: Northern Ireland

Ballyhay (from Irish Baile Hae, meaning 'Hay's townland') is a townland near Donaghadee in County Down, Northern Ireland. It is in the civil parish of Donaghadee and the historic barony of Ards Lower. It is called Bellyhie in Ulster-Scots.

Ballyhay is a rural farming community with much land used for arable and pasture farming. There are records of a church flourishing in the area since the late 13th to early 14th centuries.

Transport is available via the Number 7 bus (Moss road/Windmill road, Killaughey road) which travels from Millisle to Belfast via the Moss road.
