= Ballyboley, County Down =

Coordinates: 54°33′40″N 5°34′02″W

Ballyboley: Irish: Baile na Buaile
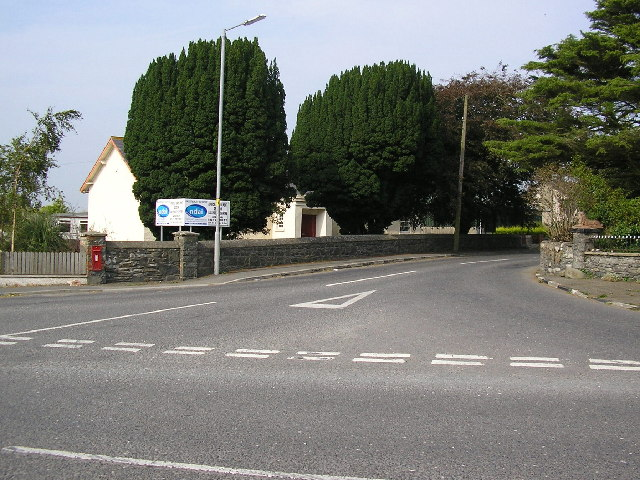
- School and crossroads in Ballyboley townland in 2005

- Location within County Down
- County: County Down
- Country: Northern Ireland
- Sovereign state: United Kingdom
- Police: Northern Ireland
- Fire: Northern Ireland
- Ambulance: Northern Ireland

Ballyboley (from Irish Baile na Buaile, meaning 'townland of the summer pasturage') is a townland of 783 acres in County Down, Northern Ireland, near Carrowdore on the Ards Peninsula. It is situated in the civil parish of Greyabbey and the historic barony of Ards Lower.
