= Loughriscouse =

Townland in Northern Ireland

Coordinates: 54°35′36″N 5°37′58″W

Loughriscouse: Irish: Luachras Cua
- Location within County Down
- County: County Down
- Country: Northern Ireland
- Sovereign state: United Kingdom
- Postcode district: BT32
- Dialling code: 028

Loughriscouse (from Irish Luachras Cua 'rushy place of (the) hollow') is a rural townland in County Down, Northern Ireland. It has an area of 1140.89 acres (4.62 km^{2}). It is situated in the civil parish of Newtownards and the historic barony of Ards Lower, located 2 miles east of Newtownards. It lies within the Ards and North Down Borough Council.

== See also ==
- List of townlands in County Down
