= Beannchar (disambiguation) =

Beannchar (Irish for 'place of points') is the Irish name for Bangor, a seaside town in County Down, Northern Ireland.

Beannchar may also refer to:

- Banagher, County Londonderry, Northern Ireland, a civil parish
- Banagher, County Offaly, Republic of Ireland, a town
- Banchory, Aberdeenshire, Scotland, a town
- Banchory-Devenick, a hamlet near Aberdeen, Scotland
- Bangor (civil parish), County Down, Northern Ireland, containing the County Down town
