= Gordons Chemist =

Pharmacy chain in the United Kingdom

Gordons Chemists is a chain of more than 50 pharmacies, located in the UK. Gordons Chemists is based primarily in Northern Ireland.

Gordons Chemists operates an online ordering and delivery service for health and beauty goods via its Gordons Direct website, posting to UK and the Republic of Ireland.

Gordons Chemists began as a single pharmacy in Donaghadee in 1980. It was founded by brothers Neil and Robert Gordon, and expanded mostly through the acquisition of other pharmacies.
