= Bangor (civil parish) =

- civil parish

Irish transcription(s)
  - Derivation: Beannchar
  - Meaning: Uncertain
- Bangor shown within Northern Ireland
- Coordinates: 54.64341°N 5.66484°W
- Sovereign state: United Kingdom
- Country: Northern Ireland
- County: Down
- Barony: Ards Lower, Castlereagh Lower
- Townlands: 30
- Settlements: Bangor, Conlig, Groomsport, Helen's Bay

Bangor (from Irish Beannchar, meaning 'uncertain') is a civil and ecclesiastical parish in County Down, Northern Ireland. It is located in the north of the Ards Peninsula, consisting of 30 townlands, twenty-two and a half of which lie in the barony of Ards Lower, with seven and a half lying within that of Castlereagh Lower. Its ancient monastery was of ecclesiastical importance.

It is bordered by the civil parishes of Donaghadee to the east, Newtownards to the south, and Holywood to the west.

== History ==
According to the Annals of Ulster, a monastery was founded in 555 or 559 by Saint Comgall. Saint Columbanus who was a pupil of St Comgall was also associated with the monastery. It flourished in the 7th and 8th centuries, after which its coastal position made it vulnerable to Vikings raids, such as in 810, which saw St. Comgall's shrine despoiled and many of the monastery's clergy slain. Despite further decline by the 10th century, in the early 12th century, St. Malachy helped restore it.

In 1571 an indenture between Queen Elizabeth I and Thomas Smith, and his son Thomas, meant that the Smith's were to conquer as much land in the Ards peninsula and northern County Down as possible. Thomas Smith junior however was killed in 1573 by Irishmen in his own service, with Thomas Smith senior dying four years later, leaving the patent unfulfilled and thus expiring. As the 17th century started, Conn O'Neill was the largest land-owner in north Down. After a series of deals between Conn O'Neill and Scotsmen Hugh Montgomery and James Hamilton, Conn's lands were divided up between them, with Conn retaining the third that lay in the barony of Castlereagh Lower. Hamilton's third centred on the north of Ards Lower, with King James I in 1605 granting him the land of Bangor monastery along with its associated townlands.

Petty's Census c1659 records 595 people of a certain wealth liable to pay tax in the parish of Bangor, 417 of which are stated as being either English or Scottish.

The Irish language appears to have died out in the area by the 19th century when John O'Donovan was working on the Ordnance Survey memoirs in the neighbouring parishes of Donaghadee and Holywood 1834. O'Donovan was unable to find any Irish speakers, and complained that the locals were ignorant of the place-names, and that their pronunciation of them was so corrupt, they were of no help in finding out the original Irish forms. In Bangor parish O'Donovan's informants were all English speakers.

== Settlements ==
Settlements within Bangor civil parish include:

- Bangor
- Conlig
- Crawfordsburn
- Groomsport
- Helen's Bay

== Townlands ==
Compared to the neighbouring parish of Donaghadee, the Normans have had minimal influence on the names of the townlands in Bangor, with the majority being of Irish origin. The civil parish contains the following townlands:

=== B ===
- Balloo, from Irish Baile Aodha, meaning 'Hugh's townland', also historically recorded with the qualifier "juxta Bangor" meaning next to Bangor.
- Balloo Lower, from Irish Baile Aodha, meaning 'Hugh's townland', also historically recorded with the qualifier "juxta Mare" meaning next to the sea.
- Ballycroghan, from Irish Baile Cruacháin, meaning 'townland of the (small) stack/hill'.
- Ballyfotherly, from Irish Baile Phúdarlaigh, meaning 'Powderly's townland', the origin of the uncommon surname Powderly is uncertain.
- Ballygilbert, from Irish Baile Ghilbeirt, meaning 'Gilbert's townland'. Gilbert was a common Anglo-Norman name.
- Ballygrainey, from Irish Baile na Gréine, meaning 'sunny townland (lit. townland of the sun)'.
- Ballygrot, from Irish Baile na gCrot, meaning 'townland of the small eminences'.
- Ballyholme, from Irish Baile Hóm, meaning 'uncertain'. It has been suggested that the second element of Ballyhom derives from the Old Norse word holmr, meaning "river meadow". This word was borrowed into English as "holm". Indeed, a few Viking burial sites have been found around the shore of Ballyholme. Otherwise it may derive from the surname "Holm(es)" which also derives from the Old Norse word holmr. In English an alternative derivation of "holm" means "dweller by a holm-oak".
- Ballykillare, from Irish Baile Cille Láir, meaning 'townland of the central church'.
- Ballyleidy, possibly from Irish Baile Uí Lidí, meaning 'Ó Lidi's townland'.
- Ballymaconnell, from Irish Baile Mhic Dhónaill, meaning 'McConnell's townland'.
- Ballymacormick, from Irish Bauile Mhic Cormaic, meaning 'McCormick's townland'.
- Ballymagee, from Irish Baile Mhic Aodha, meaning 'Magee's townland'.
- Ballyminetragh, from Irish Baile Meannán Íochtarach, meaning 'townland of the kid-goats, lower'.
- Ballymullan, from Irish Baile Maoláin, meaning 'townland of the low rounded hill'. It may however derive from the Irish Baile an Mhuilinn (townland of the mill) or Baile Uí Mhaoláin (Mullan's townland).
- Ballyree, from Irish Baile an Fhraoigh, meaning 'townland of the heather'.
- Ballysallagh Minor, from Irish Baile Salach, meaning 'dirty townland'.
- Ballysallagh Major
- Ballyvarnet, from Irish Baile Bhearnan, meaning 'townland of (the) gap'.
- Bangor Bog, despite being recorded as far back as 1625 as "Great Moss of Bangor, The", it appears that as a townland it is of more recent creation.

=== C ===
- Carnalea, from Irish Carnán Lao, meaning 'the small mound of the calf'.
- Conlig, from Irish An Choinleac, meaning 'the hound-stone'.
- Copeland Island
- Corporation, derived from English. The townland which Bangor is situated in, spanning twenty-eight acres.
- Cotton, possibly from English: Cot meaning "cottage, dwelling", or the habitational surname Cotton.

=== G ===
- Gransha, from Irish Gráinseach, meaning 'grange', which is itself derived from the French word "grange", likely brought over by the Normans.
- Groomsport, derived from a semi-translation of the Irish Port an Ghiolla Ghruama (the port of the gloomy fellow/attendant). This townland is also historically recorded under various forms of "Ballymulleragh", which is a Gaelicisation of the Anglo-Norman "Mollerytoun" (Mallory's town). Ghiolla Ghruama appears to be the Irish form of the Mallory.

=== L ===
- Light House Island
- Lisbane, from Irish Baile Lios Bán, meaning 'white fort townland', with the original baile having been dropped from the original name. An area of 214 acres three kilometres south-sou-west of Bangor. The population in 1659 consisted of nine families, all of them Scots or English and none Catholic. (There are four other places in County Down called Lisbane, including Lisbane in the parish of Tullynakill.)

=== M ===
- Mew Island

=== O ===
- Orlock, possibly from Irish Orlóg, meaning 'uncertain'.

=== P ===
- Portavoe, from Irish Port an Bhotha, meaning 'the port of the (monastic) cell'.

=== R ===
- Rathgill/Rathgael, from Irish Ráth Giall, meaning 'fort of (the) hostages'. It may however derive from Rath Guala, which according to the Annals of the Four Masters was burned by the king of Ulster, Fiachnae mac Baetain, in 618, an event also recorded in the Annals of Ulster under the year 623.

Former townlands include:

- Bangor, which consisted of five "quarter's", the names of three of which survive, the Irish forms of which appear to be: Ceathrú na Siúr, meaning "the nun's quarter"; Ceathrú na Struthán, meaning "the quarter of the (small) streams"; and Ceathrú Chnocán Dubh, meaning "quarter of the black hillocks".
- Ballyclamper, apparently part of the present townland of Ballyminetragh.
- Ballyskelly, lay south of Ballygrot, with the name preserved as Skelly's Hill.
- Carryreagh/Carrowreagh, apparently part of the present townland of Ballyminetragh.

== See also ==
- List of civil parishes of County Down
