= Carrowdore =

Village in County Down, Northern Ireland

Coordinates: 54°34′N 5°33′W

- Village
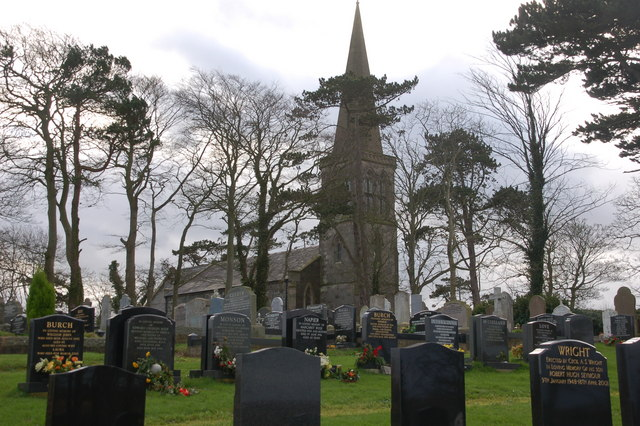
- Christ Church, Carrowdore

- Location within the United Kingdom
- Population: 1,052 (2021 census)

Carrowdore (from Irish Ceathrú Dobhair, meaning 'water quarter') is a village on the Ards Peninsula in County Down, Northern Ireland. It is situated in the townland of Ballyrawer, the civil parish of Donaghadee and the historic barony of Ards Lower. It lies within the Ards and North Down Borough, 6 miles (10 km) east of Newtownards. It had a population of 1,052 people in the 2021 census.

== Education ==
Strangford Integrated College in Carrowdore educates approx. 870 pupils. There is also a primary school, Carrowdore Primary School, which educates approx. 170 pupils. In the grounds of the primary school is a 'playgroup' nursery, which hosts approx. 30-40 young children.

== People ==
Louis MacNeice, the poet, is buried at the Church of Ireland church, Carrowdore. He died on 4 September 1963, in London and is buried beside his mother (who died of TB when he was a child) and his grandfather.

== Sport ==
Carrowdore was formerly the location of the "Carrowdore 100" motorcycle road race. The race, which started in 1927, consisted of a 5½ mile road circuit which started on the Greyabbey to Millisle Road and continued down the coast road. After World War II, the race briefly moved to Dundrod before returning to Carrowdore over a slightly shortened route, with the start in the village and the course running to just outside Greyabbey and back to Carrowdore. The last race to be held at Carrowdore was in 2000; it resulted in the death of the Tandragee rider Eddie Sinton. The same course is also used for cycling races.

== Orange Order ==
Carrowdore has two Loyal Orange Lodges, Carrowdore True Blues LOL 1051 and Rising Sons of William LOL 1058, the former being the first lodge in the village, in 1823. The Grand Master of County Down during this period was Nicholas Crommelin of Carrowdore. They are members of the Upper Ards District LOL No. 11. The Twelfth of July parade was partially held in Carrowdore in 1992.

== Population ==
=== 2011 census ===
In the 2011 census, Carrowdore had a population of 960 people (382 households).

=== 2001 census ===
Carrowdore was classified as a "small village" by the Northern Ireland Statistics and Research Agency (NISRA) (i.e. with population between 500 and 1,000 people) for the 2001 census. On census day in 2001, 29 April 2001, there were 816 people living in Carrowdore. Of these:

- 24.3% were aged under 16 years and 15.3% were aged 60 and over
- 48.9% of the population were male and 51.1% were female
- 2.1% were from a Catholic background and 93.0% were from a Protestant background
- 3.6% of people aged 16–74 were unemployed

== See also ==
- List of towns and villages in Northern Ireland
- May Crommelin
