= Rosemount Rec F.C. =

Association football club in Northern Ireland

Rosemount Rec
- Full name: Rosemount Recreation Football Club
- Nicknames: The Mount, The Rec
- Ground: Islandview Road Playing Fields, Greyabbey
- Chairman: Trevor McKay
- Manager: Luke Buchanan & Matthew Shaw
- League: NAFL 1B
- 2025-26: NAFL 1A, 13th (Relegated)
Home colours

Rosemount Recreation Football Club (commonly known as Rosemount Rec) is a Northern Irish football club from Greyabbey playing in the Premier Division of the Northern Amateur Football League (NAFL). The 2011/2012 season saw the club celebrating 100 years of organised football in Greyabbey. The club finished 1st in Division 2A of the NAFL for the 2016/17 season, which saw them in intermediate football for the first time. In the 2017/18 season, the 2nd team won division 3D of the amateur league, being promoted to 3C, celebrating two consecutive promotions.

In the 2002/03 season, the club completed a treble of trophies, winning the Down Area Winter Football League, Sittlington Cup and Billy Allen Memorial Shield.

The 2012/13 season was also a season of great success, with the club winning Division 2B of the Northern Amateur Football League and the Cochrane Corry Cup.

In the club's last season in the Down Area Winter Football league (2009/10), before joining the amateur league the next season, the club won a double, lifting the Sittlington Cup and the Down Area Winter Football League premier division.

The club fields 2 teams, The First Team plays in the premier division of the Northern Amateur Football League, and the 2nd team plays in division 3c.

The club reached the Junior Cup final in the 2014/15 season for the first time in their history, although they lost 3–1 to Harryville Homers.

In 2017, the club made history, winning an Irish cup game for the first time in their history, beating St. Lukes FC in Greyabbey.

The club is currently managed by Luke Buchanan & Matthew Shaw, who previously managed Ards Reserves, winning the league in their final season before moving to Rosemount

In the 2019/20 season, Rosemount celebrated another league title, winning division 1C, however, promotion was left in doubt due to the Amateur League voiding the season due to the coronavirus pandemic, eventually, however, Rosemount were confirmed to be promoted and be playing in 1B for season 2020/21

In 2021/22, Rosemount secured back-to-back league titles and in turn back-to-back promotions, with the club reaching 1A, it is the highest level the club has ever played at.

In 2022/23, Rosemount secured a 3rd consecutive promotion, finishing runners up in 1A behind runaway leaders Dromara Village.

== 2018/19 ==
In the 2018/19 season, led by Cathcart, Rosemount made more history by becoming the first team from 1C in the amateur league to make it to the 5th round of the Irish cup, drawing Glenavon away from home, one of the biggest and best clubs in Northern Ireland at the time, Rosemount went on to lose 5–0, but Glenavon players and officials praised the Rosemount players for their attitude and effort, Rosemount had a few chances of their own including a corner cleared off the line, Rosemounts fans were also praised for the support they gave to the Greyabbey club, the same season they made it to the semi-finals of the Border cup, losing to the previous season's champions Crumlin Star in extra time, Rosemount also made it to the clarence cup final against East Belfast, where they lost 2–1 after extra time due to a very poor refereeing decision, despite Rosemounts fantastic cup form, they went into the new year in the bottom half of the league, picking up just 3 wins from their first 9 games, drawing 2 and losing 4.

== 2019-20 ==
Rosemont secured promotion and won the 1C league title.

== 2021/22 ==
After amateur football resumed in Northern Ireland following the COVID-19 Pandemic, Rosemount secured a 2nd consecutive promotion, by winning the 1B title, this time securing it by finishing the league season undefeated.

== 2022/23 ==
Rosemount once again secured another promotion, finishing runners up behind runaway leaders Dromora in a tightly fought race for 2nd place.

== 2023/24 ==
Rosemount secured their highest ever finish, finishing 6th in the premier division of the amateur league, and making it to the 5th round of the Irish Cup once again, losing 3-0 to Loughall. It was the end of an era for the club, with Lee Cathcart & his management team leaving, as well as club stalwart Stephen Acheson retiring, and Curtis Giltrap & Luke McKee leaving to move to Australia

== 2024/25 ==
Following the departure of Lee Cathcart and his staff to Dundonald, a move labelled bizarre by many and a mass exodus of players including players such as Luke Adair & Neil Melville, former player & 2nd team manager Scott Ritchie joined the club, who has previously assembled his own squad full of players. Ultimately, the club was unable to compete and was relegated back to 1A after 2 seasons in the top flight of the NAFL.

== 2025/26 ==
Rosemount suffered a second consecutive relegation to 1B under manager Scott Ritchie, who resigned a few weeks after.

== 2026/27 ==
Scott Ritchie resigned from the role of 1st team manager following a 7-0 defeat to 1C outfit Shorts in pre-season. Steven Hollinger and his 2nd team management took on the interim role on 10th July.

On 21st July, Luke Buchanan & Matthew Shaw were appointed as joint 1st Team managers from Ards Reserves

== Club Officials ==
- Chairman: Trevor Mckay (Northern Ireland)
- Secretary: Gary Bailie (Northern Ireland)
- Treasurer: Rodney Bailie (Northern Ireland)
- 1st team Manager(s): Luke Buchanan/Matthew Shaw (Northern Ireland)
- 1st team Assistant: Cameron Shaw (Northern Ireland)
- 1st team Goalkeeper coach: Kurtis Browne (Northern Ireland)
- Club Captain: Captains Committee (Northern Ireland)
- 2nd team Manager: Steven Holinger (Northern Ireland)
- 2nd team assistant: Jonathan Parker (Northern Ireland)
- 2nd team coach: Daryl Harrison (Northern Ireland)
- 2nd team attendant: Glenn Edgar (Northern Ireland)

== Club honors - (1983-Present) ==
- Down Area Winter Football league (3),

-2001/02, 2002/03, 2007/08

- Billy Allen Memorial Shield (5),

-2002/03, 2003/04, 2007/08, 2008/09, 2009/10

- Sittlington Cup (5),

-1995/96, 2002/03, 2005/06, 2007/08, 2009/10

- Northern Amateur Football League Division 2C

-2010/11

- Northern Amateur Football League Division 2B

-2012/13

- Cochrane Corry Cup

-2012/13

- Champions of Down

-1983, 1984, 2014

- Northern Amateur Football League Division 2A

-2016/17

- IFA Junior Cup

Runners up: 2014/15, 2015/16

- Northern Amateur Football League Division 1C

-2019/20

- Northern Amateur Football League Division 1B

-2021/22

In 2011 Rosemount Rec released "A Clutch Of Memories", a book written by the Newtownards Chronicle journalist Dennis S. Nash, which covers the history of the club.

The club has a few rivals; Ballywalter, (Division 1B) and Kircubbin (Division 2A) but the club's biggest rivals are Portavogie Rangers (Division 2A)
