= Greyabbey =

Village on the Ards Peninsula, Northern Ireland

Coordinates: 54.535°N 5.560°W

Greyabbey: Irish: Mainistir Liath; Scots: Greba
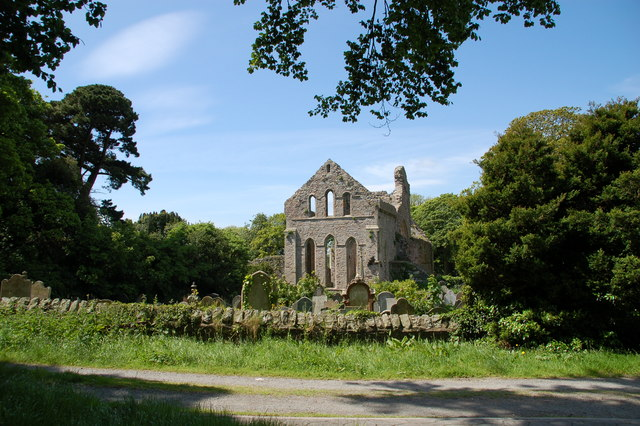
- The abbey after which the village was named

- Location within County Down
- Population: 939 (2011 Census)
- District: Ards and North Down Borough
- County: County Down
- Country: Northern Ireland
- Sovereign state: United Kingdom
- Post town: Newtownards
- Postcode district: BT22
- Dialling code: 028
- UK Parliament: Strangford
- NI Assembly: Strangford

Greyabbey or Grey Abbey (Irish: Mainistir Liath, meaning 'grey monastery') is a small village, townland (of 208 acres) and civil parish located on the eastern shores of Strangford Lough, on the Ards Peninsula in County Down, Northern Ireland.

It lies 7 miles (11 km) south of Newtownards. Both townland and civil parish are situated in the historic barony of Ards Lower. It is within the Ards and North Down Borough. It had a population of 939 people in the 2011 Census.

Greyabbey is often associated with the antiques trade, there being several specialist antique shops in the village, as well as some interesting Georgian and Victorian buildings. Of particular note is Mount Stewart Estate (National Trust) as well as a traditional coaching inn.

== History ==
The village (and townland) derives its name from the Grey Abbey, a Cistercian abbey-monastery located on the eastern side of the village, dating from 1193. Historically it was also called Monesterlee or Monesterlea, which are anglicisations of its Irish name Mainistir Liath ("grey abbey/monastery").

It was founded by Affreca, daughter of Godred Olafsson, King of the Isles, and wife of John de Courcy, Anglo-Norman conqueror of part of the province of Ulster.

The site of the abbey was on the Ards Peninsula, 7 miles (11 km) from Newtownards, at the confluence of a small river and Strangford Lough. Architecturally it is important as the first fully gothic style building in Ulster; it is the first fully stone church in which every window arch and door was pointed rather than round headed. The ruined abbey is now located in the parkland of Rosemount House, home of the Montgomery family, to the east side of the village, in the modern townland of Rosemount.

Tradition says that Affreca founded the abbey in thanksgiving for a safe landing after a perilous journey at sea. The abbey was colonised with monks from Holmcultram in Cumberland, with which it maintained close ties in the early years. The construction of the stone church began almost immediately. In 1222, and again in 1237, abbots of Grey Abbey went on to become abbots of Holmcultram. The Latin name of the abbey is Iugum Dei, which means "Yoke of God". Little is known of the abbey's history, although it appears to have been almost completely destroyed during the invasion of Edward Bruce (1315–18). No reliable sources concerning the value of the abbey foundation survive, but it is not likely to have been prosperous.

The abbey was dissolved in 1541. In the same year, part of the monastic property was granted to the 11th Earl of Kildare. The monastery was physically destroyed during the military operations of the Elizabethan era. In 1572, Bryan O'Neill burnt Grey Abbey to stop it being used as a refuge for English colonists trying to settle in the Ards Peninsula.

During the 17th century, the church nave was re-roofed and served as a parish church until 1778. In the late 19th century, repairs were executed by The Office of Public Works (The O.P.W.).

Unfortunately, an excessive amount of concrete was used, the crudity of which is still obvious today. The remains of the abbey include the abbey church and some of the conventual buildings, dating from c.1193 – c.1250. The original plan of the monastery can be followed with ease through foundations and earthworks. The abbot's seat has been preserved. It is fitted inside a pointed arch and flanked by detached colonettes. Corbel tables are also a rarity in Ireland, but the Cistercians can boast two of them, one at Tintern and one at Grey. At Grey the corbels were inserted when the roof was raised, probably in the early fifteenth century. There are eight of them altogether, carved with oak leaves, human figures and animal heads.

An outstanding effigy of a 'sword seizing' knight survives, thought to date from c. 1300 as well as an effigy of a woman carved in high relief and attired in thickly cut robes. Tradition relates that this is Affreca, who was buried in the abbey, but the style suggests that the effigy actually originated in the fourteenth century, a hundred years after her death. The ruins are now set in a private parkland, belonging to the eighteenth-century mansion, Rosemont House. The park is not accessible to the public.

Irish Rebellion of 1798: on the morning of Pike Sunday, 10 June 1798, a force of United Irishmen, mainly from Greyabbey, Bangor, Donaghadee, and Ballywalter, attempted to occupy the town of Newtownards. They met with musket fire from the market house and were defeated. It is because of this association with the rebellion that the term "The Green Boys o' Greba" was given to the men of the village. GREBA is the name given to the village by the local residents, and also by those from the neighbouring areas. It is a localised "Ulster-Scots" terminology.

The Rebellion of 1798 also affected the village in another form, with the death by hanging of the Rev James Porter, Minister of Trinity Presbyterian Church, Greyabbey, on 2 July 1798. The final resting place of Rev Porter is in the Old Graveyard, Greyabbey, which itself lies adjacent to the ancient Abbey ruins.

On Tullykevin Road, in Greyabbey, there is a brass plate on a field post in remembrance of a pilot who crashed and died there during the Second World War.

== Churches ==
In the village are three places of worship: St Saviour's Church of Ireland Church (located beside the ruins of the Grey Abbey); Trinity Presbyterian Church; and First (Non-Subscribing) Presbyterian Church.

Cardy Gospel Hall is also found on the outskirts of the village on the Cardy Road.

The local Catholic 'chapel' or place of worship is St Mary Star of the Sea Church, Nunsquarter, Inishargy.

St Saviour's is noted for having a peal of change-ringing bells, which for almost 130 years was the only set of three bells in Ireland, until they were restored and added to in 2001.

== Loyal Orange Lodge ==
A Loyal Orange Lodge, working under the authority of the Grand Orange Lodge of Ireland sits in the Orange Hall, Main Street, Greyabbey. It takes the title of Greyabbey Loyal Orange Lodge, number 1592, and is itself part of the Upper Ards District LOL No 11, in the County Down Grand Orange Lodge. It was first formed in the village in 1863 and has had continued membership to the present day.

A Junior Orange Lodge also meets in the village and takes the title of Greyabbey Junior Loyal Orange Lodge, number 253, and works under the authority of the Junior Grand Orange Lodge of Ireland. The Junior Lodge was formed in 1977.

== Bands ==
Greyabbey has had many musicians who have learned their skills through membership of the local bands. These bands, also known as "marching bands" have ranged from accordion, part-music flute, and the present-day first-flute, being the Greyabbey Flute Band.

They take part in street parades, village festivals commemorating Remembrance Day, the Battle of the Somme, and the Battle of the Boyne as well as celebrating Orange Lodge Sunday Services. In 2022, Greyabbey hosted The Twelfth for the first time in 50 years.

The village also has had the traditional Ulster Lambeg Drums as part of the music scene of the area. The history of these large percussion instruments goes back to the Williamite Wars in Ireland, circa 1690.

== Notable natives ==
- Actress Flora Montgomery is the daughter of William Montgomery of Rosemount House and was born and raised in Greyabbey, their ancestral house
- Rev Coslett Herbert Waddell, a botanist, lived in the village
- Holly Hamilton, BBC journalist and presenter

== Sport ==
The star of Ards Football Club's successful 1968/69 Irish Cup campaign came from the village. Billy McAvoy hit four goals in the Irish Cup Final replay when Ards, from the County Down town of Newtownards, defeated Distillery 4-2 after extra-time to win the cup for the third time in the club's history. This equalled the post-war record for the number of goals scored by one person in an Irish Cup Final, a record which still stands today, (2016).

Amateur side Rosemount Rec are the village's sole senior football club, while a summer youth football tournament is organised by Abbey Star Juniors Football Club.

== Environment ==
There is a DRD Water Service wastewater treatment works at Greyabbey, which employs sophisticated membrane technology. This facility and a similar Works at Kircubbin, were completed under the same £3.5 million contract. The original Greyabbey Wastewater Treatment Works was designed to treat wastewater for a population of 1,000. Since being upgraded, it is capable of treatment for a population of 2,500. The Works at Greyabbey helps to protect the marine environment in Strangford Lough. Two sea defences are located at Greyabbey on the eastern side of the Lough.

== Civil parish of Greyabbey ==
The civil parish contains the village of Greyabbey and Mount Stewart house and estate.

=== Townlands ===
The civil parish contains the following townlands, aside from Greyabbey (with the localised meaning in parentheses):

- Ballyblack ("Black's townland")
- Ballyboghilbo ("Townland of the Cowherd")
- Ballyboley ("Townland of the summer pasturage")
- Ballybryan ("Bryan's townland")
- Ballycastle ("Townland of the Castle")
- Ballyewry ("Townland of the place of Yew Trees")
- Ballygrangee ("Townland of the Grange")
- Ballymurphy ("Townland of the Murphys")
- Ballynester ("Townland of the Doorkeeper")
- Ballyurnanellan ("Townland of the Yew of the Island")
- Blackabbey
- Bootown ("Booth's townland")
- Boretree Island East
- Cardy ("The Forge")
- Chapel Island
- Cunningburn
- Gordonall ("Gordon's lands")
- Island South
- Killyvolgan ("Central Wood")
- Kilnatierny ("Lord's little wood")
- Mid Island
- Mount Stewart ("Mount of the Stewarts")
- Rosemount (a.k.a. "The Manor House")
- South Island
- Tullykevin ("Kevin's hillock")

== Islands ==
Islands dotted around Strangford Lough and set within the Greyabbey Parish area include : Boretree Island; Boretree Rock; Chanderies; Chapel Island; Gabbock Island; Hare Island; Mid Island; Pattersons Hill; Peggys Island; Pig Island; South Island; Turley Rock; and Whaup Rock.

== See also ==
- List of towns and villages in Northern Ireland
- List of civil parishes of County Down
- List of townlands in County Down
