= Donaghadee Town Hall =

Municipal Building in Donaghadee, Northern Ireland

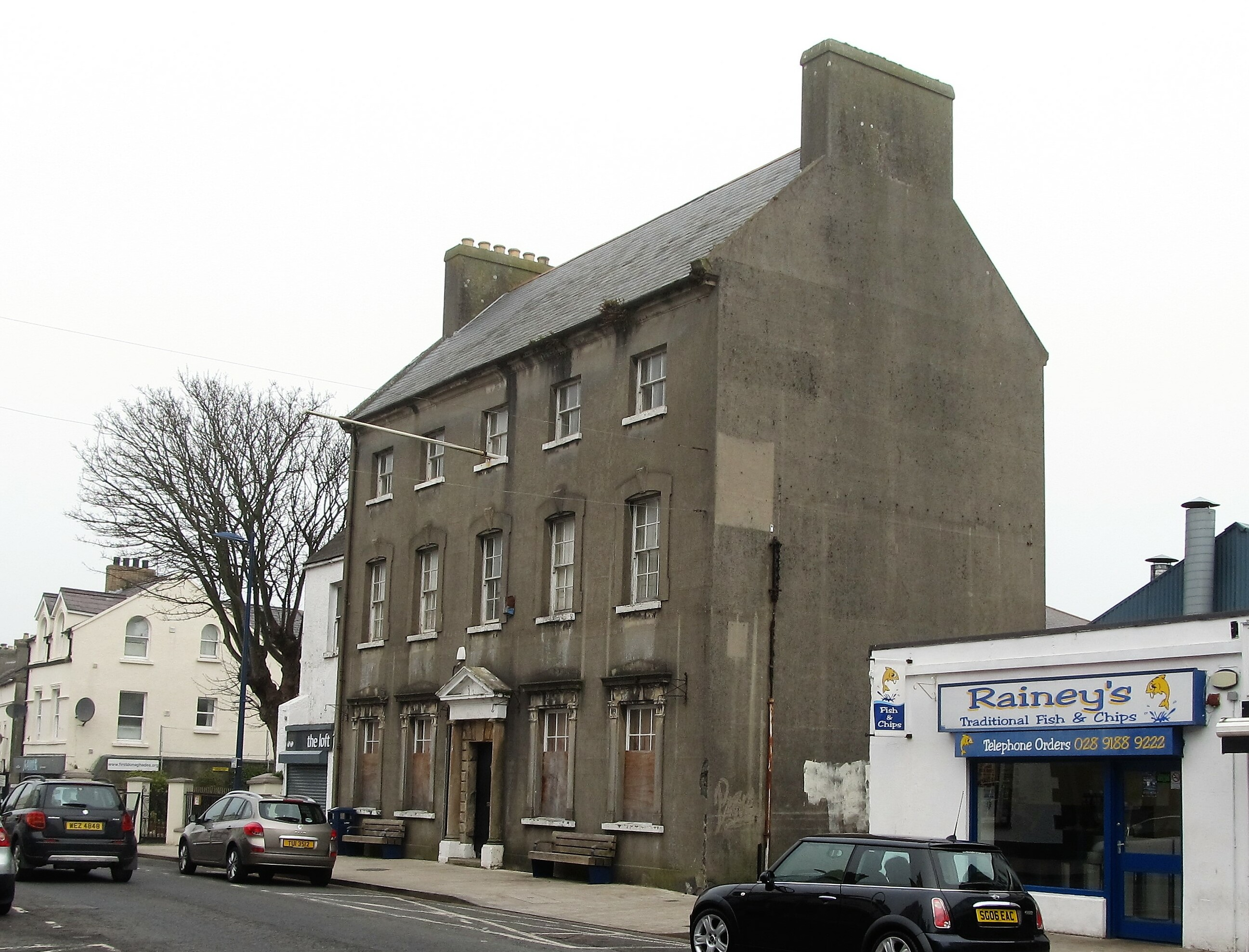
- Donaghadee Town Hall

- Shown in Northern Ireland
- 54.6420°N 5.5365°W
- Location: High Street, Donaghadee

History
- Built: c.1770

Site notes
- Architectural style: Georgian style

Listed Building – Grade B+
- Official name: Former Town Hall, 24 High Street, Donaghadee, County Down
- Designated: 20 December 1976
- Reference no.: HB 24/07/004

Donaghadee Town Hall, also known as The Merchant House, is a municipal structure in the High Street, Donaghadee, County Down, Northern Ireland. The structure, which has been converted for residential use, is a Grade B+ listed building.

== History ==
The building was commissioned as a private house: it was designed in the Georgian style, built in greywacke stone and was completed in around 1770. The design involved a symmetrical main frontage with five bays facing onto the High Street; the central bay featured a doorway flanked by pedestals with Ionic order columns supporting an entablature and a pediment. The other bays on the ground floor and all the bays on the first floor were fenestrated by twelve-pane sash windows whilst the windows on the second floor were fenestrated by six-pane sash windows. At roof level, there was a cornice and a hip roof.

By the 1830s, the house was owned by a muslin merchant, Samuel Cochrane, who imported his goods through Donaghadee Harbour. After a local resident, Mrs McCready, was murdered by her husband in 1852, the lane adjacent to the building became known as Murder Lane.

The building was bought the Pritchard family for use as a boarding house in 1914 and was then acquired by Donaghadee Urban District Council in the mid-20th century. The council, which had previously been based elsewhere in the High Street, then relocated its officers and their departments into the building. It continued to serve as the headquarters of the council for several decades, but ceased to be the local seat of government when the enlarged Ards Borough Council was formed in 1973.

The building was then used by the council as workspace for the delivery of local services, including the implementation of a local employment scheme in the late 20th century. However, it fell vacant in the early 21st century, and, after its condition subsequently deteriorated, it was acquired by a developer, Michael Dunlop of Urban Property Solutions, in 2017. An extensive programme of works costing £1.9 million, which involved the removal of the cement render on the front of the building, the restoration of the stonework and the conversion of the interior into five private apartments, as well as the construction of four mews cottages in the courtyard behind, was completed in 2021.
