= Kircubbin F.C. =

Kircubbin
- Full name: Kircubbin Football Club
- Founded: 1923
- Ground: Kircubbin Playing Fields
- League: Northern Amateur Football League

Kircubbin Football Club, simply referred to as Kircubbin, are a Northern Irish football club based in Kircubbin, County Down, Northern Ireland. Kircubbin F.C. were founded in 1923, and they play in the Northern Amateur Football League. Kircubbin are a part of the County Antrim & District FA. The club play in the Irish Cup.

Kircubbin play their home games at Kircubbin Playing Fields. Their home colours are black and green.

== History ==
Kircubbin F.C. was founded in 1923 and is based in the town of Kircubbin, County Down, the town's only football club. The club was founded by the Kircubbin community as a pastime.

Kircubbin joined the Irish Churches Football League in the 1940's, and later the Belfast & District League. Kircubbin won the District Shield in 1951.

The club was admitted as a member of the Northern Amateur Football League in 2004.

In 2009, Kircubbin claimed the Borough Cup.

In 2015, Kircubbin were crowned Champions of County Down, after beating Portaferry Rovers in a penalty shoot-out at Davidson Park.

== Honours ==
- Irish Football Association
  - Champions of County Down Tournament
    - 2015
  - Borough Cup
    - 2009
- Belfast & District League
  - District Shield
    - 1951
