= Arnold Benington =

British ornithologist

Arnold Benington (25 April 1903 – 2 April 1982) was a British ornithologist who was instrumental in establishing the Copeland Bird Observatory. He obtained a B.Sc. at Queen's University Belfast in 1926 and obtained his first teaching job in Worcester. He taught Chemistry and Biology in Friends' School, Lisburn from 1927 to 1968. Between 1961 and 1967, he wrote the "Nature Diary" column in the Belfast Telegraph.

His obituary was published in the Copeland Bird Observatory Report for 1981.
