= Finnian of Movilla =

Irish missionary (c. 495–589)

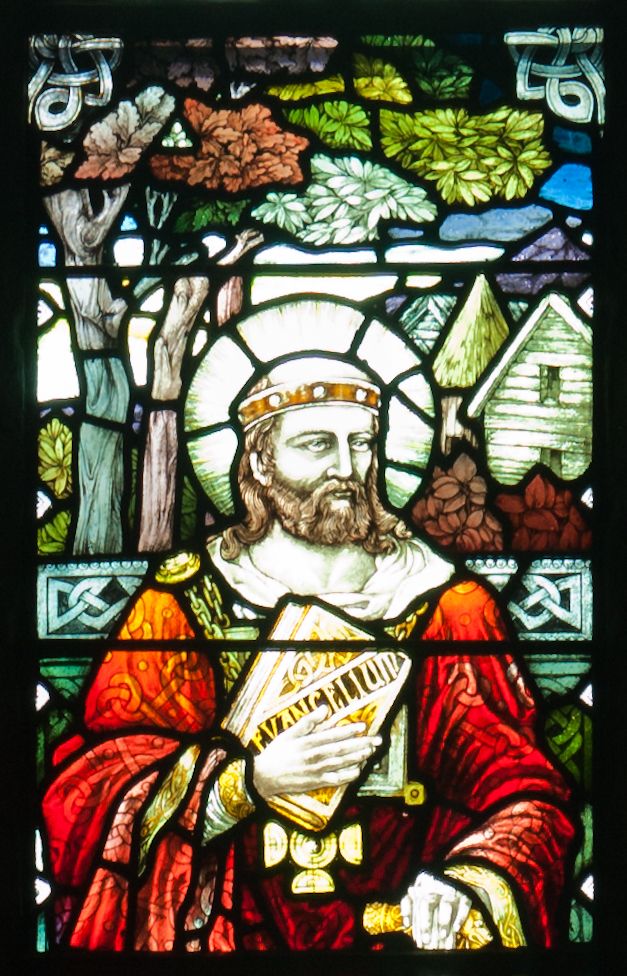
- Finnian depicted in stained glass, Kildare Cathedral
- Born: c. 495 possibly Ulster
- Died: c. 589
- Venerated in: Eastern Orthodox Church; Roman Catholic Church; Church of Ireland; Anglican Communion
- Major shrine: Movilla Abbey
- Feast: 10 September
- Patronage: Ulster

Finnian (Note: Sometimes given as Uinniau in older sources. The hagiographer Alban Butler calls him "Saint Finian, or Winin".) of Movilla (c. 495–589) was an Irish Christian missionary. His feast day is 10 September.

== Origins and life ==
Finnian (sometimes called Finbarr "the white head", a reference to his fair hair), was a Christian missionary in medieval Ireland. He should not be confused with his namesake Finnian of Clonard, nor should Movilla (Maigh Bhile) in County Down be mistaken for Moville in County Donegal.

Traditional scholarship has it that he was a descendant of Fiatach the Fair and born in Ulster, but his lineage has been questioned lately by the American Celticist Thomas Owen Clancy. He apparently studied under Colman of Dromore and Mochaoi of Nendrum, and subsequently at Candida Casa (Whithorn), after which he proceeded to Rome to complete his studies. Legend has it that whilst at Candida Casa, he played a prank (nature unknown) on Princess Drustice, the daughter of a Pictish king, who was in the ladies' section of the monastery, and perhaps had he not been so well connected, his clerical career could have been in ruins. However, after spending seven years in Rome, he was ordained a priest, and returned to Ireland with a copy of St. Jerome's Vulgate. He returned to found a monastery of his own and, at a time when books were rare, this text brought honour and prestige to the establishment.

== Movilla Abbey ==
Finnian founded his new monastery (Movilla Abbey) in 540, at Maigh Bhile (Movilla)—the plain of the ancient tree, a sacred place, venerated in pagan times, about a mile from the northern shore of Strangford Lough (the 15th Century ruins of Movilla Abbey can still be seen in Newtownards). He founded a famous school of Druim Fionn at about this time. Legend has it that he tried to convert Tuan mac Cairill, a mythical figure who was the last survivor of the Partholonian race, and that while doing so had the famous Scéal Tuáin maic Cairell recounted to him. This is a text about takings of Ireland, a source for the famous Lebor Gabála Érenn.

Finnian was sponsored in building and maintaining his monastery by the king of the Dál Fiatach. It became a monastic community of great significance in Ulster and Ireland as a centre of Celtic Christian worship, learning, mission, and also commerce. Finnian's association with Movilla was memorialised in the Book of Armagh as "vir vitae venerabilis qui jacet in miraculis multis in sua civitate Maghbile" (A man of venerable life who reposes in many miracles in his city of Movilla). At the time of Finnian's death in 579, Movilla was already recognised as a great monastic foundation. The Abbey survived as a place of Christian witness for over a thousand years, until the Dissolution of the Monasteries in 1542.

== Teacher of Columba ==
Finnian's most distinguished pupil at Movilla was Columba. Tradition has it that Columba's surreptitious copying of a psalter led eventually to his exile on Iona. What remains of the copy is housed in the Royal Irish Academy in Dublin. The casket that contained it is now in the National Museum of Ireland. It is known as the Cathach of St. Columba, Cathach, or Battler, and was customarily carried by the O'Donnells in battle. The inner case was made by Cathbar O'Donnell in 1084, but the outer is fourteenth century work.

Adomnán of Iona claimed that Columba served as a deacon under Finnian, whom Adomnán claimed to be a bishop. Adomnán, in his biography of Columba, recorded a story that claimed Columba performed the miracle of turning water into wine. Finnian was performing mass on one occasion, but they had run out of wine. Columba then proceeded to a well and drew water. He called on Christ's name and blessed the water he drew from the well, whereupon the water transformed into wine and he brought the wine to the mass. This was the first miracle that Columba did in his life, according to Adomnán.

== Rule and code ==
Finnian wrote a rule for his monks, also a penitential code.

== Notes ==
- (1) In 2001 Thomas Owen Clancy, a Celticist at the University of Glasgow, argued that St Finnian and St Ninian were one and the same person, and that the confusion is due no less than to an 8th-century scribal spelling error.

== Sources ==
- Clancy, T. O. "The real St Ninian", in Innes Review, 52 (2001), pp. 1–28
- MacKillop, James. A Dictionary of Celtic Mythology. Oxford, 1998.
