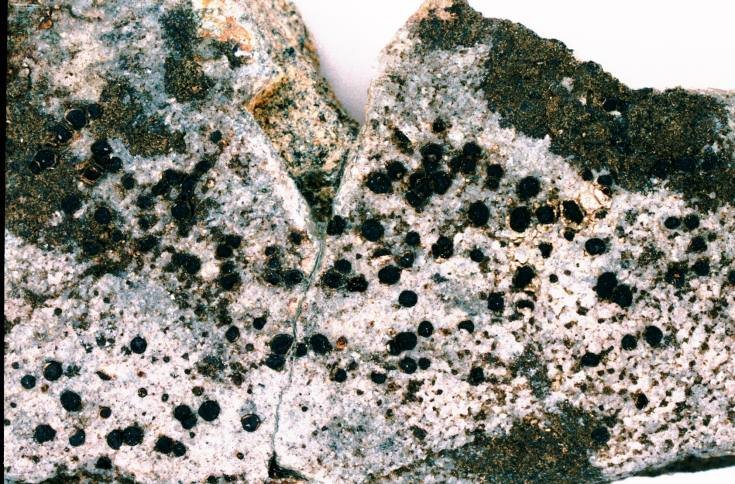
- Polysporina simplex

Scientific classification
- Domain: Eukaryota
- Kingdom: Fungi
- Division: Ascomycota
- Class: Lecanoromycetes
- Order: Acarosporales
- Family: Acarosporaceae
- Genus: Polysporina; Vèzda (1978)

Type species
- Polysporina simplex (Taylor) Vězda (1978)

= Polysporina =

Genus of lichens

Polysporina is a genus of fungi in the family Acarosporaceae. The genus was circumscribed by the Czech lichenologist Antonín Vězda in 1978. Some of the species form lichens, while others are species of lichenicolous (lichen-dwelling) fungi.

== Species ==
As of March 2025, Species Fungorum (in the Catalogue of Life) accepts seven species of Polysporina:

- Polysporina arenacea (H.Magn.) K.Knudsen & Kocourk. (2008)
- Polysporina cyclocarpa (Anzi) Vězda (1978)
- Polysporina frigida Kantvilas & Seppelt (2006)
- Polysporina golubkovae S.Y.Kondr., Lőkös, J.S.Park & Hur (2016)
- Polysporina limborinella (Müll.Arg.) Hafellner (2018)
- Polysporina pusilla (Anzi) Nimis (1993)
- Polysporina subfuscescens (Nyl.) K.Knudsen & Kocourk. (2008)
