= Donaghadee (civil parish) =

- civil parish

Irish transcription(s)
  - Derivation: Domhnach Daoi
  - Meaning: Daoi's church
- Donaghadee shown within Northern Ireland
- Sovereign state: United Kingdom
- Country: Northern Ireland
- County: Down
- Barony: Ards Lower
- Settlements/Townlands: Donaghadee, Carrowdore, Millisle; townlands: 30

Donaghadee (from Irish Domhnach Daoi, meaning 'Daoi's church') is a civil parish in County Down, Northern Ireland. It is situated in the historic barony of Ards Lower.

== Settlements ==
Settlements within Donaghadee civil parish include:

- Carrowdore
- Donaghadee
- Millisle

== Townlands ==
Donaghadee civil parish contains the following 30 townlands:

- Ballybuttle
- Ballycopeland
- Ballycross
- Ballydoonan
- Ballyfrenis
- Ballyhaskin
- Ballyhay
- Ballymacruise
- Ballymoney
- Ballynoe
- Ballyrawer
- Ballyrolly
- Ballyvester
- Ballywilliam
- Ballywhiskin
- Carney Hill
- Carryreagh
- Craigboy
- Drumfad
- Ganaway
- Grangee
- Herdstown
- Hogstown
- Islandhill
- Kilbright
- Killaghy
- Miller Hill
- Sloanstown
- Templepatrick
- Town Parks of Donaghadee

== See also ==
- List of civil parishes of County Down
