= Kircubbin, County Down =

Coordinates: 54°29′N 5°32′W

Kircubbin: Irish: Cill Ghobáin
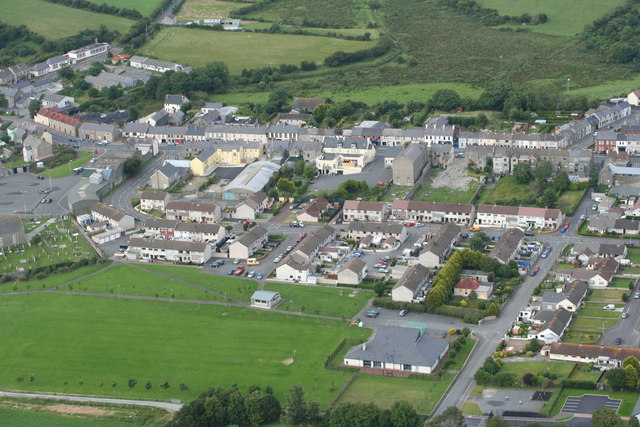

- Location within County Down
- County: County Down
- Country: Northern Ireland
- Sovereign state: United Kingdom
- Post town: NEWTONARDS
- Postcode district: BT22
- Dialling code: 028
- Police: Northern Ireland
- Fire: Northern Ireland
- Ambulance: Northern Ireland

Kircubbin is a village and townland in County Down, Northern Ireland. The village had a population of 1,153 people in the 2011 census.

== History ==
The settlement was originally known as Kilcubin, which is thought to come from Irish Cill Ghobáin, meaning "St Goban's church". This later became Kirkcubbin, from the Ulster-Scots word for church, kirk.

=== 1798 Rebellion ===
Archibald Warwick, a Presbyterian licentiate and member of the United Irishmen from Kircubbin, was hanged in 1798 near his church, for participating in Irish Rebellion of 1798.

=== The Troubles ===
Two significant incidents occurred during the Troubles. In 1974, St Mary Star of the Sea Church, Nunsquarter, which still stands and is used today, was badly damaged by a bomb planted at the side door of the chapel. One man, a local joiner who was working in the church hall adjacent to the church, left the premises shortly before the bomb went off.

=== Boys' Home abuse ===
In 2014, the Christian Brothers admitted to the physical and sexual abuse of boys in their care from 1951 to 1985 at the De La Salle Boys' Home, Rubane House, Kircubbin, often referred to as the "Kircubbin Boys' Home". or simply "Kircubbin", and issued an apology to its victims.

== Population ==
=== 2011 census ===
In the 2011 census, Kircubbin had a population of 1,153 (471 households).

=== 2001 census ===
Kircubbin was classified as a village by the Northern Ireland Statistics and Research Agency (NISRA) (i.e. with population between 1,000 and 2,250 people) for the 2001 census. On census day (29 April 2001), there were 1,214 people living in Kircubbin. Of these:

- 25.0% were aged under 16 years and 17.4% were aged 60 and over
- 48.9% of the population were male and the other 51.1% were female
- 66.8% were from a Catholic background and 31.2% were Protestant

== Economy ==
In 2013, Echlinville Distillery was granted the first licence to distil spirits in Northern Ireland in over 130 years.

== Sport ==
Kircubbin F.C. play in the Northern Amateur Football League. They were founded in 1923, and have won the Borough Cup in 2009, and Champions of County Down in 2015.
