= Newtownards (civil parish) =

Civil parish in County Down, Northern Ireland

Newtownards is a civil parish in County Down, Northern Ireland. It is situated in the historic baronies of Ards Lower and Castlereagh Lower.

== Settlements ==
Settlements within Newtownards civil parish include:

- Newtownards

== Townlands ==
Newtownards civil parish contains the following townlands:

- Ballyalicock
- Ballyalton
- Ballybarnes
- Ballyblack
- Ballycullen
- Ballyhaft
- Ballyharry
- Ballyhenny
- Ballymagreehan
- Ballymoney
- Ballyreagh
- Ballyrogan
- Ballyskeagh High
- Ballyskeagh Lower
- Ballywatticock
- Bootown
- Commons
- Corporation North
- Corporation South
- Craigogantlet
- Cronstown
- Crossnamuckley
- Drumawhyu
- Drumhirk
- Greengraves
- Gregstown
- Killarn
- Loughriscouse
- Milecross
- Movilla
- Scrabo
- Tullynagardy
- Whitespots

== See also ==
- List of civil parishes of County Down
