= Movilla Abbey =

Abbey in Northern Ireland

Coordinates: 54.595911°N 5.674514°W

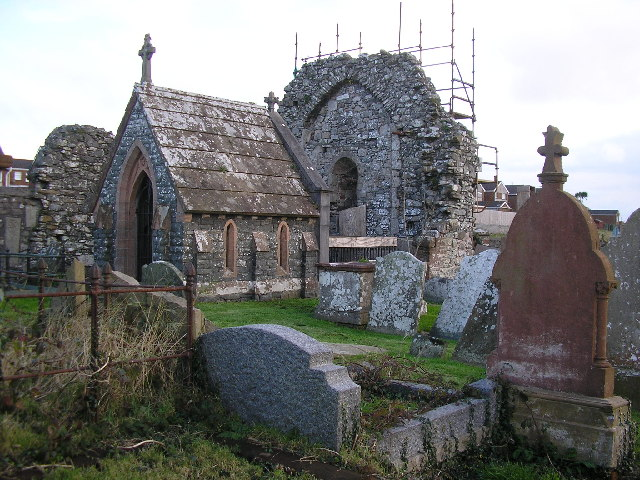

Movilla Abbey (Irish: Mainistir Mhaigh Bhile "Monastery of the Plain of the Notable Tree") in Newtownards, County Down, Northern Ireland, is believed to have been one of Ulster's and Ireland's most important monasteries. Movilla should not be confused with Moville in County Donegal.

== Founding ==
The Abbey of Movilla was founded in 540 by St. Finnian (d. 579) under the patronage of the king of the Dál Fiatach. It survived as a place of Christian witness for over a thousand years, until the Dissolution of the Monasteries in 1542. The name Movilla is an Anglicized form of the Irish magh bile, which means “the plain of the ancient tree,” so called because on the site where the abbey was built, pagans had previously worshipped a sacred tree. Finnian's association with Movilla was memorialized in the Book of Armagh as “vir vitae venerabilis qui jacet in miraculis multis in sua civitate Maghbile” (A man of venerable life who reposes in many miracles in his city of Movilla). At the time of Finnian's death in 579, Movilla was recognised as a great monastic foundation.

== History ==
Finnian's legacy ensured that Movilla Abbey flourished. By the seventh century, it had become one of the greatest monasteries in Ireland - a thriving centre of Celtic Christianity, a community of worship, prayer, study, mission and trade. The Abbey's reputation was enhanced by virtue of the fact it had a complete copy of the Bible (the Latin Vulgate Bible), which Finnian had obtained from Rome. At the time, it was the only complete copy of the Bible in the whole of Ireland, and served to enhance Movilla's reputation nationally, as a unique centre of learning. Movilla's most famous student was St. Columba, a pupil of Finnian's. Columba became a deacon while at Movilla and is said to have performed his first miracles there, turning water into wine for the Eucharist. After completing his training, Columba eventually went on his own way, but returned to Movilla to visit his old teacher in the 550's. This was to be a significant visit, as it led to what is thought to be the world's first recorded wrangle over copyright.

During his stay at Movilla, Columba asked Finnian if he could spend some time examining the Abbey's precious copy of the Scriptures. Columba was keen to have a copy of his own, but he knew that Finnian would not permit him to copy it, so he began to transcribe it secretly without his permission. He had almost completed his task when Finnian found out what he was doing. Finnian insisted that Columba surrender the 'pirate' copy, but Columba refused. In order to seek redress, Finnian took the case to Diarmait mac Cerbaill, the High King of Ireland. He pronounced his famous verdict: 'To every cow belongs her calf, to every book its copy. The copy belongs to Finnian.' Columba returned his copy in bad grace, and because he disagreed with King Diarmaid's ruling against him, he reportedly instigated a successful rebellion of the Uí Néill clan against the King. The battle, called the Battle of the Book, was claimed to have caused around 3,000 casualties.

In addition to being a Christian centre of prayer, learning and mission, Movilla was known for its flourishing work in crafts, particularly bronze and glass. In 1980–81, R.J. Ivens and M.J. Yates excavated the area near the Movilla Road before it was realigned. They said: 'Without doubt the most important finds from the early monastery were those illustrating the skills of the craftsmen, who worked in iron, bronze and glass. There was much industrial debris - lumps of slag, broken pieces of crucible and fragments of scrap metal, all informative but perhaps not very exciting. But a few objects do stimulate the imagination. For example, a trial-piece, on which the bronzesmith rehearsed his designs of triangles, scrolls and arcs, and a glass-headed pin, decorated with discs and trails of different coloured glass. The technical and artistic sophistication of such objects is certainly at variance with the impression of material poverty given by the simple timber houses and rather crude pottery...The excavation of a very small part of what was once an extensive monastic settlement has thus given...an insight into the skills of the early Christian craftsmen.'

In the seventh century, Pope Honorius I sent an epistle to a number of Celtic churchmen, encouraging conformity to the Roman dating of Easter and cautioning against the Pelagian heresy. It is believed that one of the recipients was St. Cronan of Movilla, whom Bede, in his list of recipients, specified as Cromanus.

In the early eighth century, the bishop at Movilla was Colman, son of Murchu, who wrote a hymn to St. Michael the Archangel. It begins:

In Trinitate spes mea fixa non in omine

Et archangelum deprecor Michaelem nomine

In the Trinity my hope is fixed not in an omen,

And the archangel I beseech, Michael by name.

Movilla began to decline after it was sacked by the Danes in 823, and was united with Bangor Abbey in the tenth century; it was somewhat revitalized in 1135 when St. Malachy of Armagh established a group of Augustinians in the abbey, but it never recovered its former glory. In 1306 the monastery at Movilla had one of the lowest valuations of church property in the area, at two and a half marks. Movilla was so poor that the ruling Anglo-Normans had no interest in taking it over and left Irishmen as abbots.

The abbey was dissolved by Henry VIII in 1542. During the reign of Elizabeth I, Brian O’Neill, chief of the O'Neills of Clandeboye, burned Movilla, along with other abbeys in the Ards in his campaign to prevent the English from using Irish abbeys for their military garrisons.

== Abbey Ruins and Movilla Cemetery ==
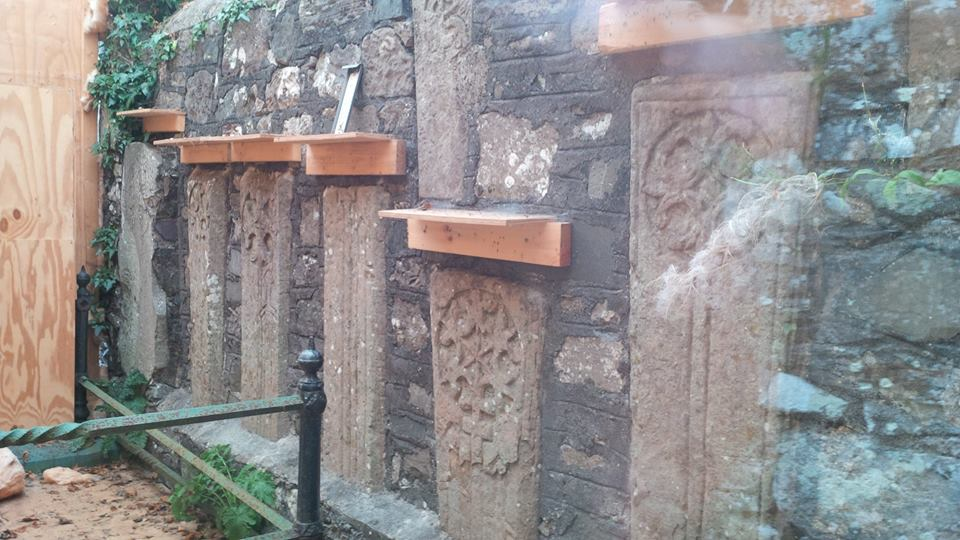
Movilla Abbey engraved stones

Nothing visible remains today of Finnian's Celtic Abbey. What ruins still standing are those of the (15th Century) Augustinian church, which comprises two gables, placed about 150 feet apart. Inside, the church measures 107 feet by 21 feet. In the east wall, there once was a three-light window, two of which have largely been blocked up. The third window remaining is Romanesque in style. At the top of the arch are two small carved heads. In the west wall are two lights with trefoil heads and transoms showing signs of tracery.

The existing ruins can only be accessed through the entrance to Movilla Cemetery, on Old Movilla Road. On the north wall of the Augustinian abbey ruin are seven 13th century tapered sandstone grave slabs with large crosses carved in relief in various designs. Those for men depict swords, while those for women depict a shear (sickle) and with (willow). Anglo-Norman in origin, the slabs date from the tenth to the thirteenth century. One of them bears the inscription “Or Do Dertrend,” which translates as “a prayer for Dertriu,” who, presumably, was a tenth-century abbot of Movilla.

There are also numerous memorials from the early seventeenth century, two of which are especially notable: the tomb of the Corry Family, which is designed as a small Doric temple; and the Parr Mausoleum, built in 1860 in the Gothic Revival style.

The surrounding Movilla Cemetery (managed by Ards and North Down Borough Council), is still in use and is the site of twenty-one Commonwealth burials from World War I and twenty-four from World War II, seven of which remain unidentified. Some of the more recent burials include that of Colonel Robert Blair Paddy Mayne, one of the most highly decorated British soldiers in World War II; and that of Ottilie Patterson (Barber), the jazz and blues singer most noted for her performances with the Chris Barber Band in the 1950s and '60s.

== The Abbey Stone ==
In 1886, W. J. Patterson offered this information to the Annual Report of the Belfast Naturalists' Field Club:

Some years ago, a curious stone object was dug up in the burial ground which surrounds the ruins of the old Abbey Church of Movilla near Newtownards, Co. Down. It was found under the following circumstances: A gentleman living in the neighbourhood, wishing to construct a family burial vault, had an excavation made to the depth of eight or ten feet, until the solid slate rock which underlies the clay of the cemetery was reached. At the bottom of the excavation, resting on the rock, was found [a] large stone coffer. . . .The measurements are as follows:--Length, 3 feet 8 inches; width, 2 feet 8 inches; height, 1 foot 10 inches. Inside measurements—26 inches long, 14 inches wide, and about 15 inches deep. Its general appearance is that of a clumsily made oblong trough on which the only attempt at ornamentation consists of some shallow panels worked on the outside. Within the upper edge, there is a ledge sunk about an inch, which may have been for the purpose of receiving a stone lid.

Many who examined the stone believed it to be an early baptismal font “hastily buried for security on the approach of some party of Danish pirates.” Others have speculated the object was a chest, or coffer, for the safe keeping of church valuables, which would accord with the fittings for a stone lid and comport with the Viking theory. Another theory is that the object was the base of a sculptured cross and that the hollow part was the mortice in which the end of the cross had stood. Patterson, however, rejected that idea on the grounds that the size of the block would have been totally disproportionate to the large socket; in fact, for a cross to have stood in the object's base, it would have required a shaft, or stem, 26 inches wide by 14 inches thick and “would have been of such a weight as to have burst out so frail a base, if the cross got the slightest lean to either side.”

== Preservation ==
Movilla Abbey, church of Augustinian Canons, is a State Care Historic Monument in the townland of Movilla, in Borough of Ards, at grid ref: J5035 7440.

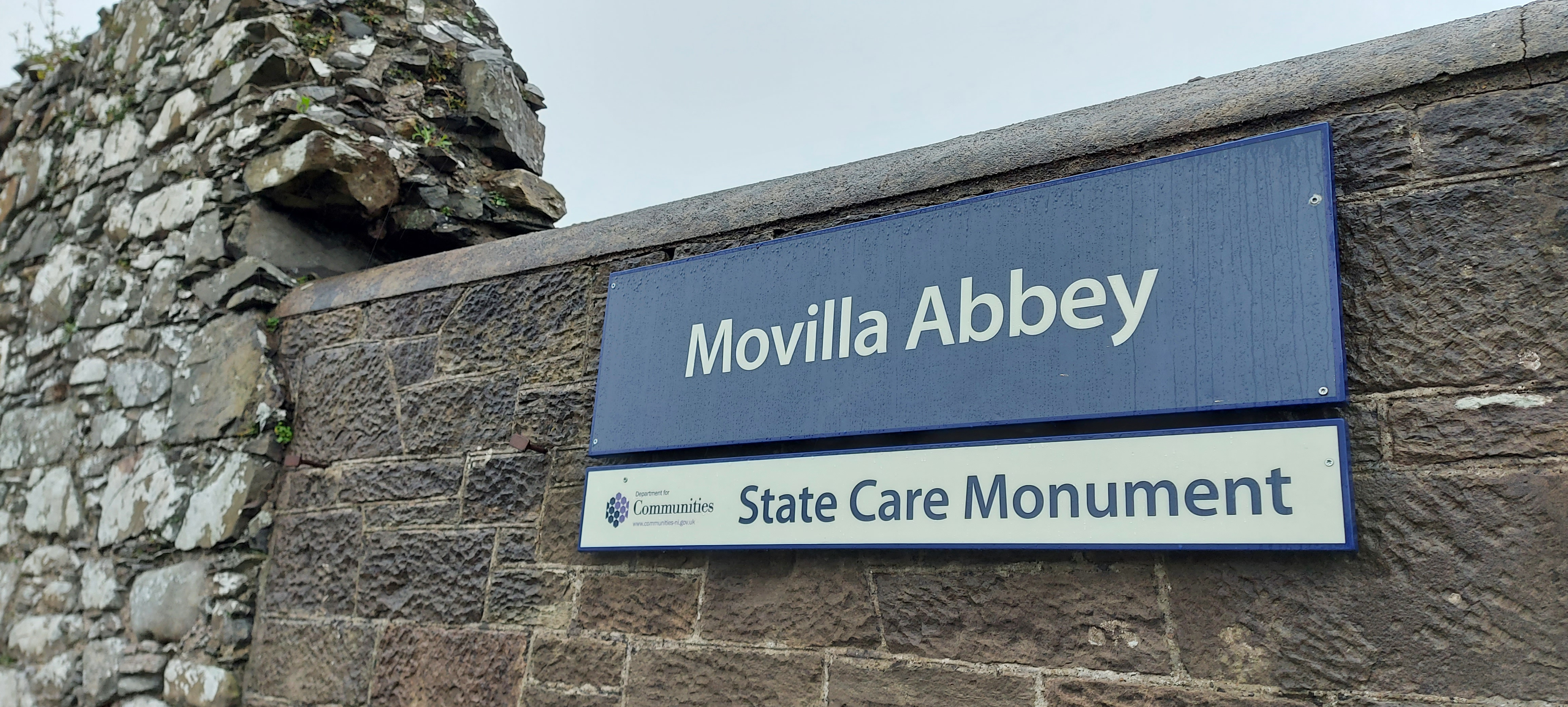

== Gallery ==
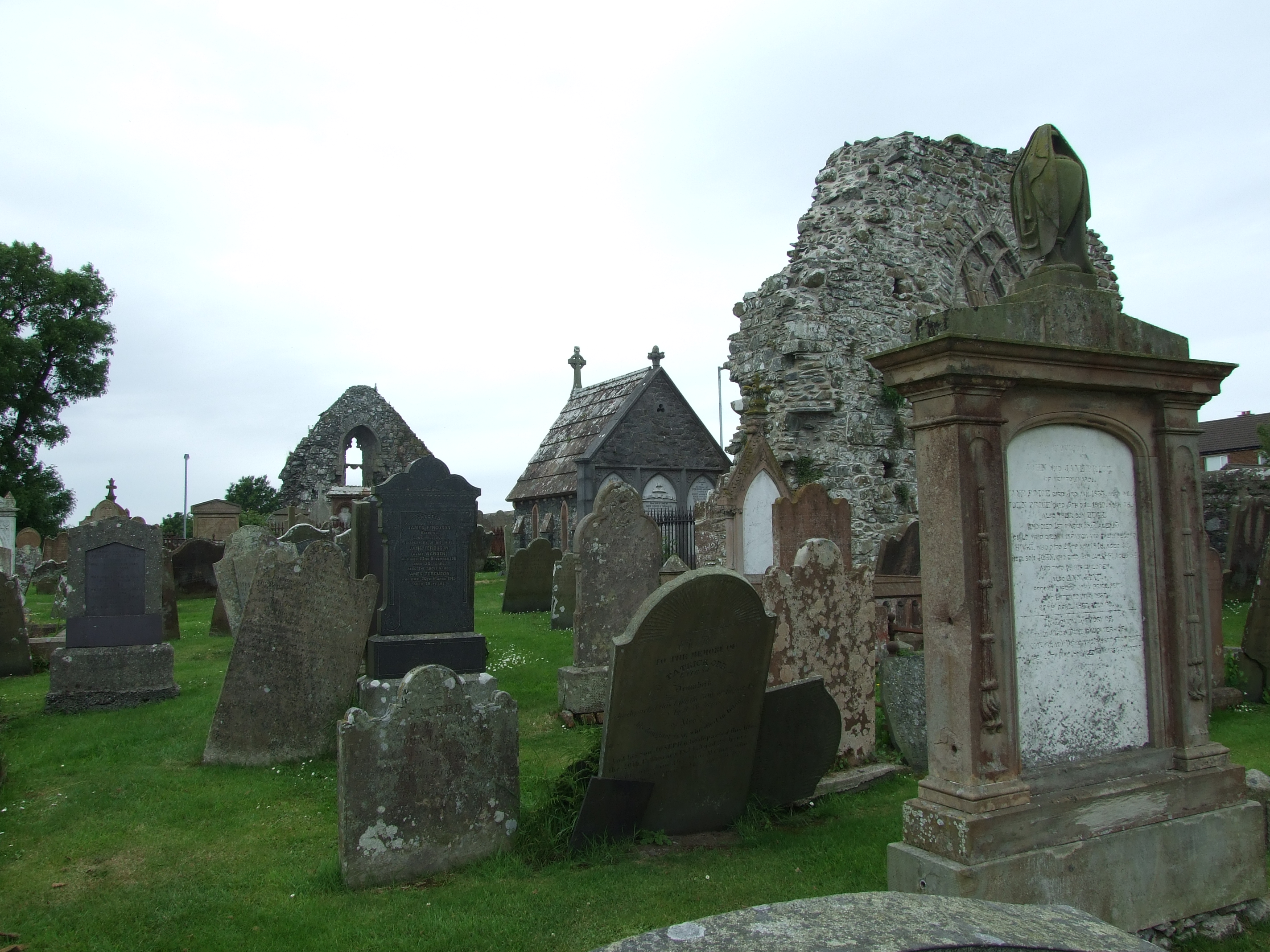
Movilla Abbey Ruins

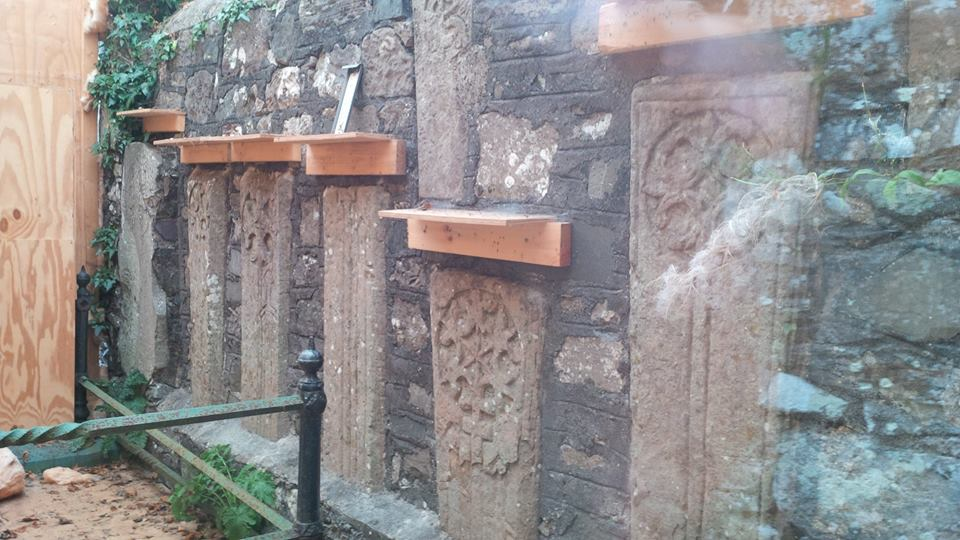
Probable monastic grave slabs 10th-13th Century

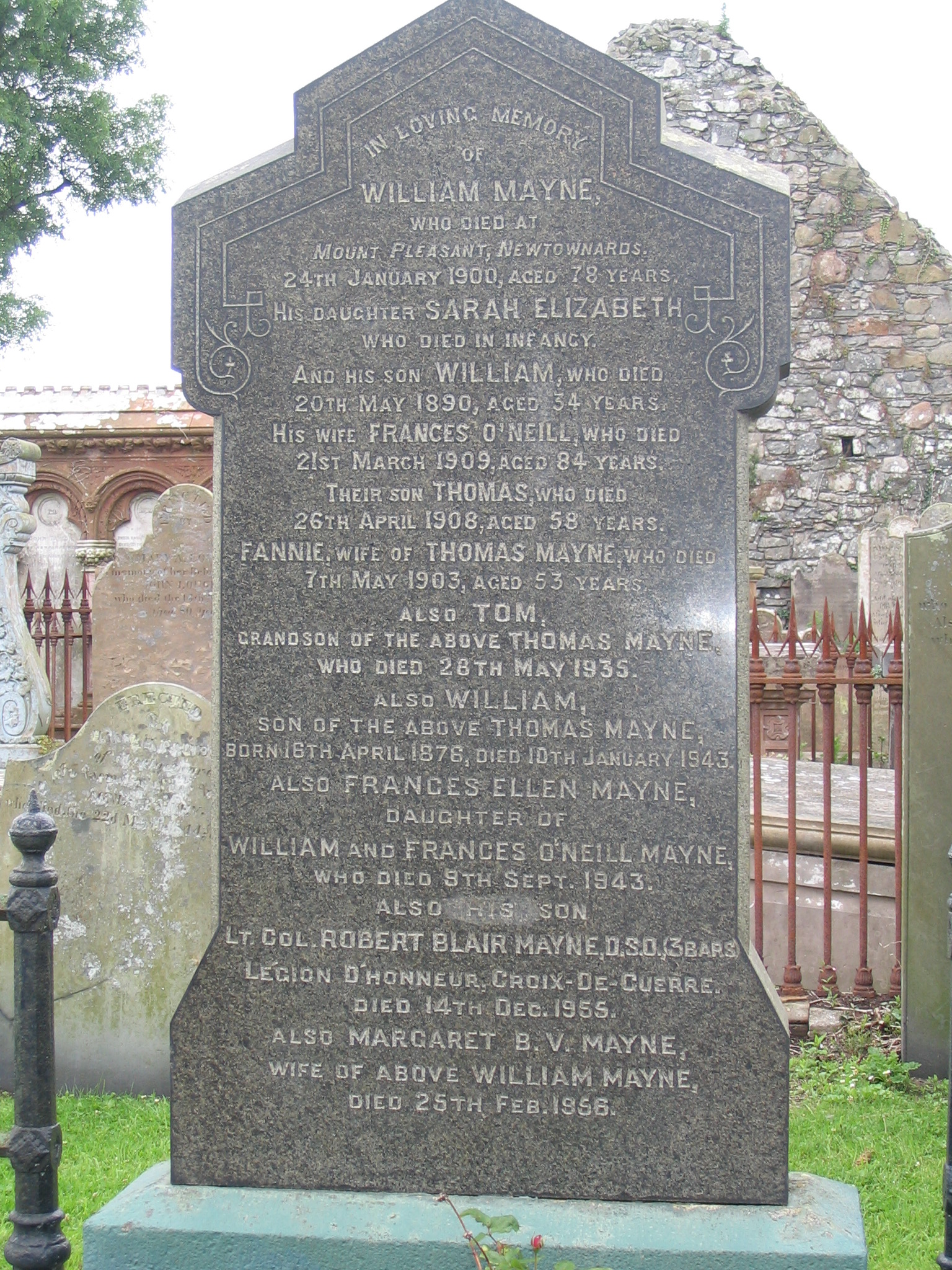
Grave Of Col. Paddy Mayne

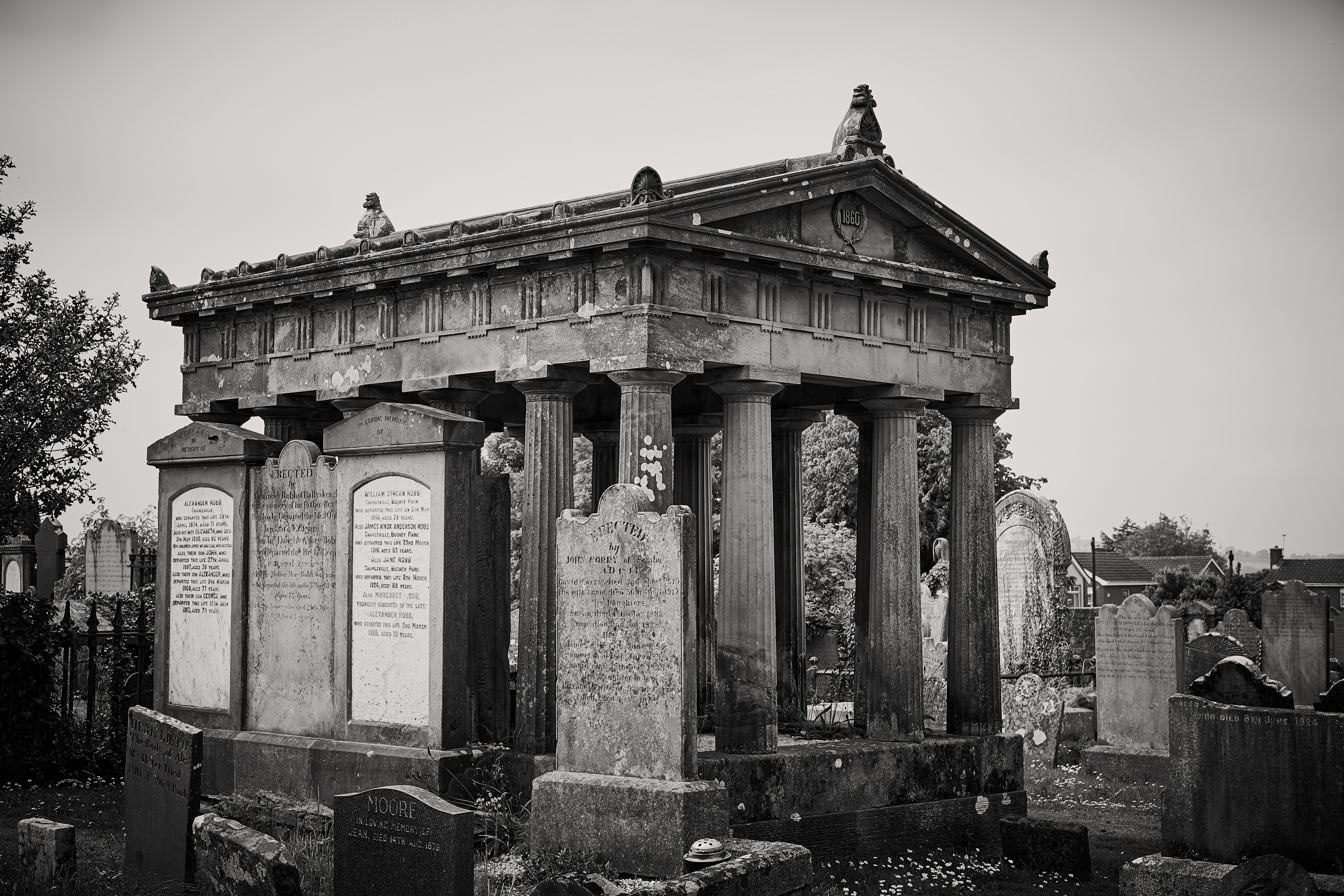

== See also ==
- Abbeys and priories in Northern Ireland (County Down)
- List of archaeological sites in County Down
