= Donaghadee =

Town in County Down, Northern Ireland

Coordinates: 54.63°N 5.53°W

Donaghadee: Irish: Domhnach Daoi; Scots: Tha Dee
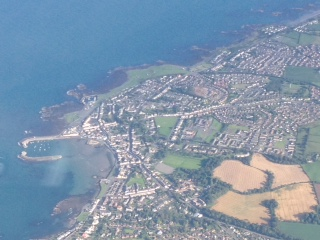
- Aerial View of Donaghadee.

- Location within County Down
- Population: 7,325 (2021 census)
- District: Ards and North Down Borough
- County: County Down
- Country: Northern Ireland
- Sovereign state: United Kingdom
- Post town: DONAGHADEE
- Postcode district: BT21
- Dialling code: 028
- Police: Northern Ireland
- Fire: Northern Ireland
- Ambulance: Northern Ireland
- UK Parliament: North Down

Donaghadee (/ˌdɒnəxəˈdiː/ DON-ə-khə-DEE, from Irish Domhnach Daoi) is a small town in County Down, Northern Ireland. It lies on the northeast coast of the Ards Peninsula, about 18 miles (29 km) east of Belfast and about six miles (10 km) south east of Bangor. It is in the civil parish of Donaghadee and the historic barony of Ards Lower. The town had a population of 7,325 people in the 2021 census.

== History ==
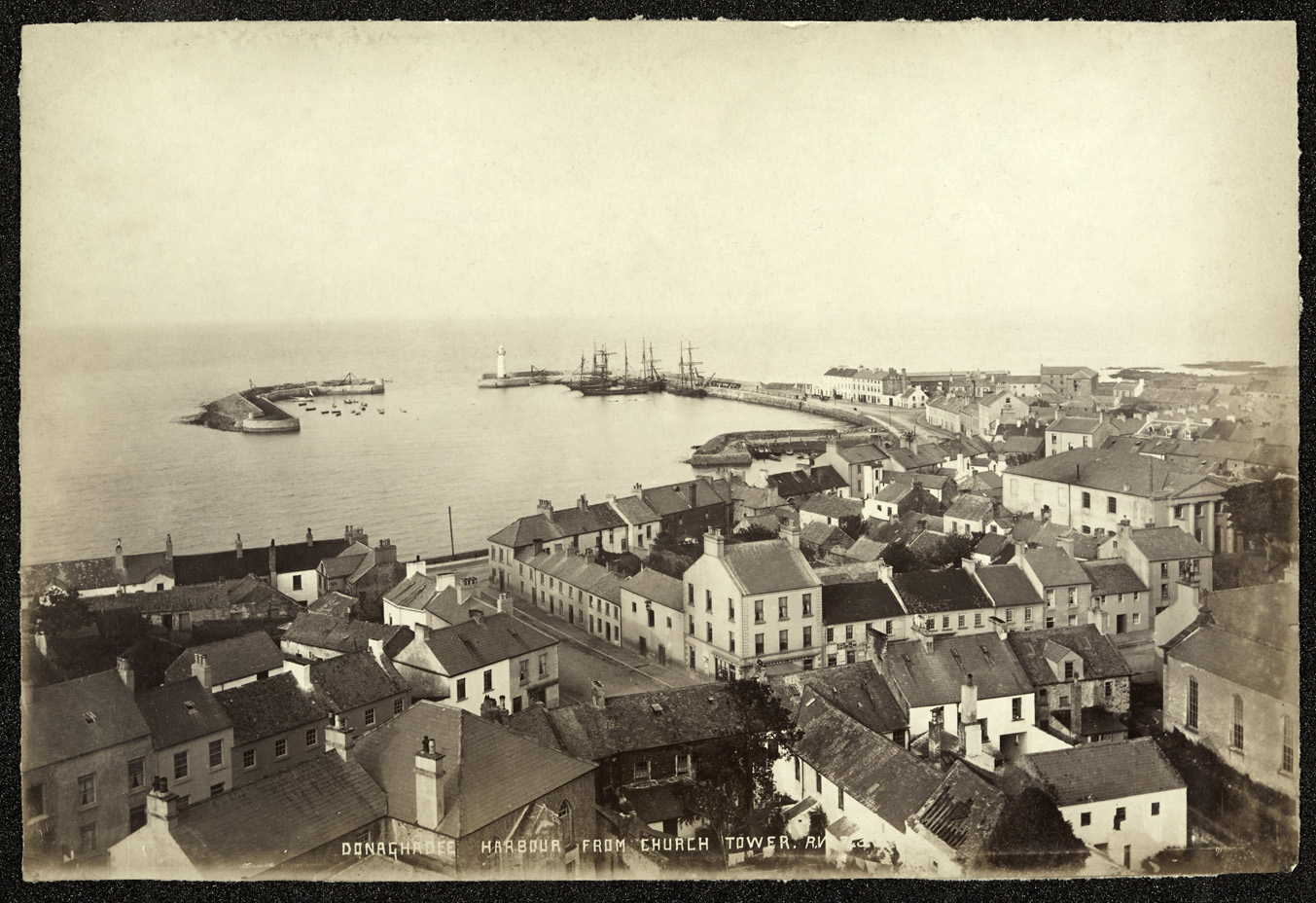
Donaghadee c.1914

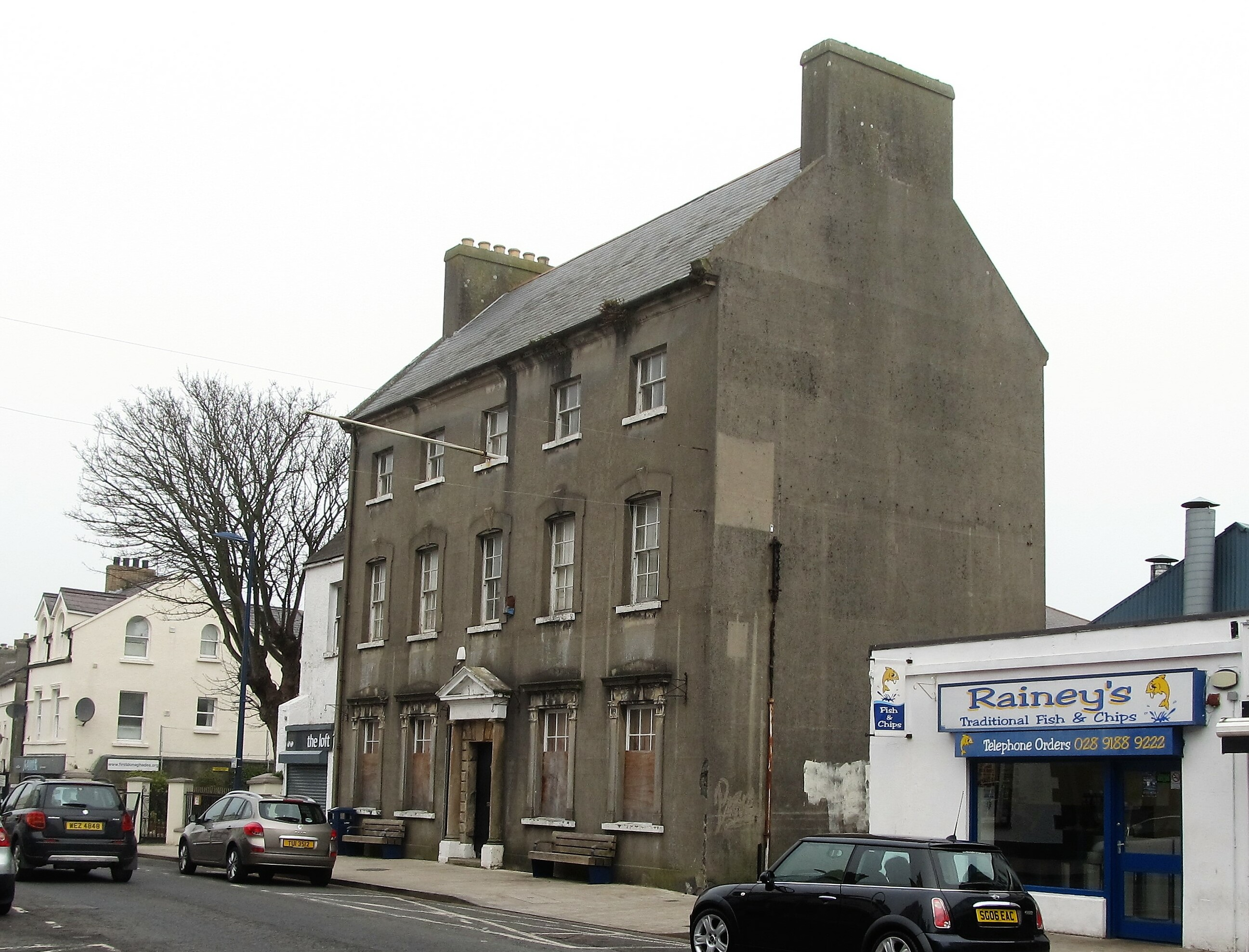
The former Donaghadee Town Hall

The name 'Donaghadee' comes from Irish Domhnach Daoi, which has two possible meanings: "church of Daoi", after an unattested saint, or "church of the motte". Originally the site of a Gaelic ringfort, the Anglo-Normans built a motte-and-bailey castle on the site after they conquered the area in the late 12th century.

In the early 17th century, Hugh Montgomery settled Scottish Protestants there as part of the Plantation of Ulster, and it began to grow into a small town. The former Donaghadee Town Hall is a converted merchant's house which was completed in around 1770.

The town featured in the Irish Rebellion of 1798. On the morning of Pike Sunday, 10 June 1798 a force of United Irishmen, mainly from Bangor, Donaghadee, Greyabbey and Ballywalter attempted to occupy the town of Newtownards. They met with musket fire from the market house and were defeated.

Donaghadee was used in the 1759–1826 period by couples going to Portpatrick in Scotland to marry, as there was a daily packet boat. During this period, Portpatrick was known as the "Gretna Green for Ireland".

The population at the time of the 1841 census was 3,151.

Donaghadee railway station, which was open for passenger traffic from 1861 to 1950, was on the Belfast and County Down Railway.

== Demography ==
=== 2011 Census ===
On Census day (27 March 2011) there were 6,869 people living in Donaghadee (2,997 households), accounting for 0.38% of the NI total. The Census 2011 population represented an increase of 6.1% on the Census 2001 figure of 6,470. Of these:

- 18.43% were aged under 16 years and 22.03% were aged 65 and over
- 51.89% of the usually resident population were female and 48.11% were male
- 82.84% belong to or were brought up in a 'Protestant and Other Christian (including Christian related)' religion and 6.39% belong to or were brought up in the Catholic faith
- 76.58% indicated that they had a British national identity, 31.26% had a Northern Irish national identity and 5.71% had an Irish national identity (respondents could indicate more than one national identity)
- 44 years was the average (median) age of the population
- 11.98% had some knowledge of Ulster-Scots and 2.48% had some knowledge of Irish (Gaelic)

=== 2021 Census ===
On Census day 2021 there were 7,325 people living in Donaghadee. Of these:

- 76.06% (5,571) belong to or were brought up in a 'Protestant and Other Christian (including Christian related)' religion, 6.49% (475) belong to or were brought up in the Catholic faith, 1.00% (73) belong to or were brought up in Other religions and 16.45% (1,205) had no religious background
- 70.68% (5,177) indicated that they had a British national identity, 37.97% (2,781) had a Northern Irish national identity and 7.60% (557) had an Irish national identity (respondents could indicate more than one national identity)
- 14.38% (1,053) had some knowledge of Ulster-Scots and 2.01% (147) had some knowledge of Irish (Gaelic)

== Lifeboat stations ==
The RNLI lifeboat station at Donaghadee harbour has been in operation from 1910, with two men from the crews receiving the RNLI Bronze Medal. As of 2023, it operates a Trent-class lifeboat, MacQuarie.

The Sir Samuel Kelly is a noted lifeboat once based in Donaghadee and now on show and preserved at the harbour for her efforts over 50 years ago. On 31 January 1953, the lifeboat rescued many survivors in the Irish Sea from the stricken Larne–Stranraer car ferry, MV Princess Victoria.

== Places of interest ==
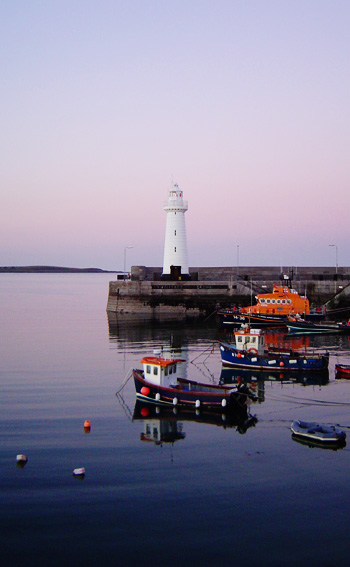
Donaghadee Harbour and lighthouse

=== Harbour and lighthouse ===
Donaghadee is known for its harbour and lighthouse. The initial plans and surveys for the harbour were made by John Rennie Senior. He died within two months of work beginning, and was succeeded by his son, John, later Sir John Rennie: the work was completed in 1825. The lighthouse, which was built in limestone was completed in the late 1830s. During the COVID-19 Quarantine, people, usually younger people would place painted stones which would show support to the National Health Service (NHS), major parts of Donaghadee, milestones or just fun drawings. They were removed in late-2020 but in mid-2022 a small bench in the motte was painted with smaller designs of the stones.

=== The Motte ===
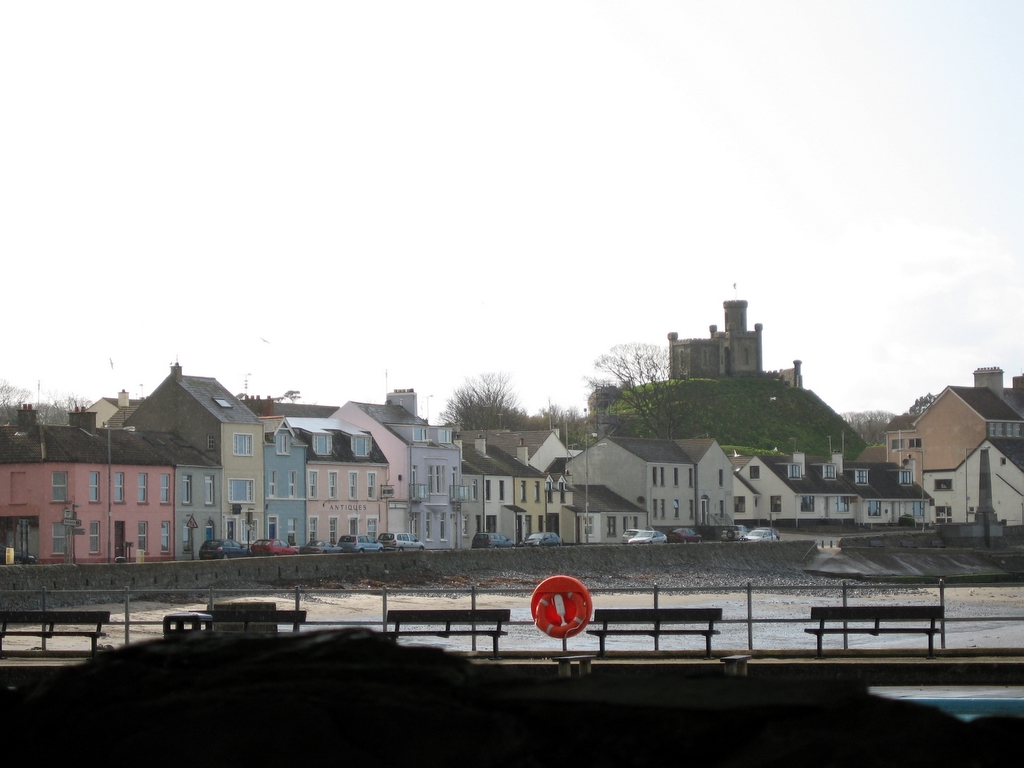
Donaghadee Motte

The Motte or Moat in Donaghadee was originally a motte-and-bailey castle built by the Anglo-Normans in the late 12th century. The folly or castle on top of the motte was built by Daniel Delacherois in the early 19th century. It was used for storing the gunpowder, used for blasting, when the new harbour was being built between 1821 and 1834. The Motte was restored between 2018 and 2022, and a camera obscura was installed. Today it is part of a park, giving views across the town and seawards towards the Copeland Islands.

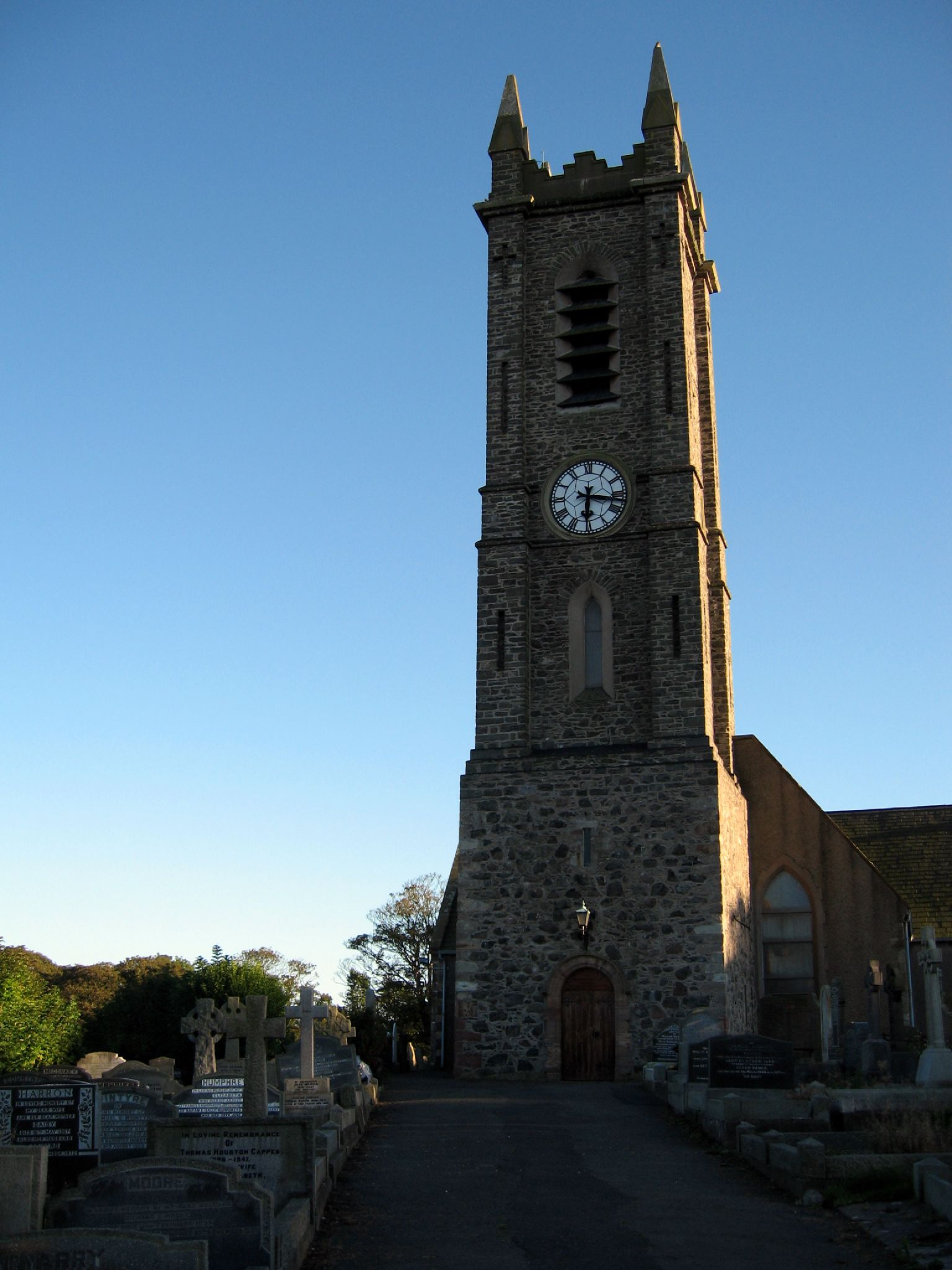
Donaghadee Parish Church

=== Other activities ===
Scenic walks include the marine walk at The Commons, which comprises a 16-acre (6.5 ha) semi-cultivated open space with bowls, tennis, several exercise equipment, putting and an adventure playground. There are several restaurants and pubs in the town, including Grace Neill's, opened in 1611 as the "King's Arms", and which claims to be the oldest bar in Ireland (a claim also made by other pubs, including by Sean's Bar in Athlone).

== Wildlife ==
=== Birds ===
The Copeland Bird Observatory is situated on Lighthouse Island, one of the three islands not far, and to be seen, from Donaghadee. It collects data on the migrating birds and by ringing them records the movements of the migratory species. The islands are an internationally important site for breeding Manx Shearwater and Arctic Tern.

=== Flora ===
Among the algae recorded from Donaghadee are Gastroclonium ovatum, Callophyllis laciniata, Fucus ceranoides, Desmarestia ligulata, Hordaria flagelliformis, Codium fragile ssp. atlanticum and Cladophora pygmaea. Flowering plants have been recorded from Donaghadee and are listed with details by Hackney (1992).

== Choir ==
Donaghadee Male Choir was founded in 1932. It began as a small local chorus performing in churches and other local functions. The choir has performed internationally and has a membership of over 70 people.

== In the media ==
Donaghadee was the basis for the fictional town of Donaghadoo in the children's television series Lifeboat Luke, which was animated by the Donaghadee animation studio Straandlooper. The town was also used as a set for some of the film Mickybo and Me.

Donaghadee is seen in the films Robot Overlords starring Gillian Anderson, Divorcing Jack, Killing Bono and Mo the Mo Mowlam story, starring Julie Walters.

Donaghadee features as the fictional town of Port Devine in the BBC drama Hope Street which first aired in 2021.

Donaghadee is mentioned, albeit commonly mispronounced as Don-a-dee in the song Forty Shades of Green, written by Johnny Cash in 1959.

== Sports ==
Donaghadee Rugby Football Club, which was formed by the Rev. Coote, played its first match against Bangor on 7 November 1885.

Donaghadee Football Club are junior football who play their home matches at Crommelin Park in the town. For the 2014–15 season they were members of Division 2C of the Northern Amateur Football League. An earlier club of the same name held membership of the same league from 1948 to 1953. Donaghadee FC and Donaghadee 11s were both promoted from their respective leagues in 2016/17.

Donaghadee Ladies' Hockey Club have two teams which play in Ulster Hockey leagues: The 1XI play in Senior League 3, while the 2XI are in Junior 8.

Donaghadee also has an 18-hole, links-style Golf Club, on the Warren Road near the shore, north of the town.

Donaghadee Sailing Club (which underwent redevelopment and in May 2009 with a new clubhouse opened).

== Notable people ==
- Sarah Grand, author and feminist
- Bear Grylls, adventurer, writer and television presenter was raised in Donaghadee until he was 4 – his grandmother was Patricia, Lady Fisher.
- Sylvia, Lady Hermon, former MP for North Down
- John MaGowan, former PDC Darts professional
- Mason Munn, Rangers FC goalkeeper
- Sir Walter Smiles and his daughter Patricia, Lady Fisher (both Ulster Unionist Party Westminster MPs) lived in the town.

== See also ==
- Belfast and County Down Railway
- List of civil parishes of County Down
- List of lighthouses in Ireland
- List of localities in Northern Ireland by population
- List of RNLI stations
- List of towns and villages in Northern Ireland
- Market houses in Northern Ireland
