= Ards Lower =

Ards Lower An Aird Íochtarach (Irish)
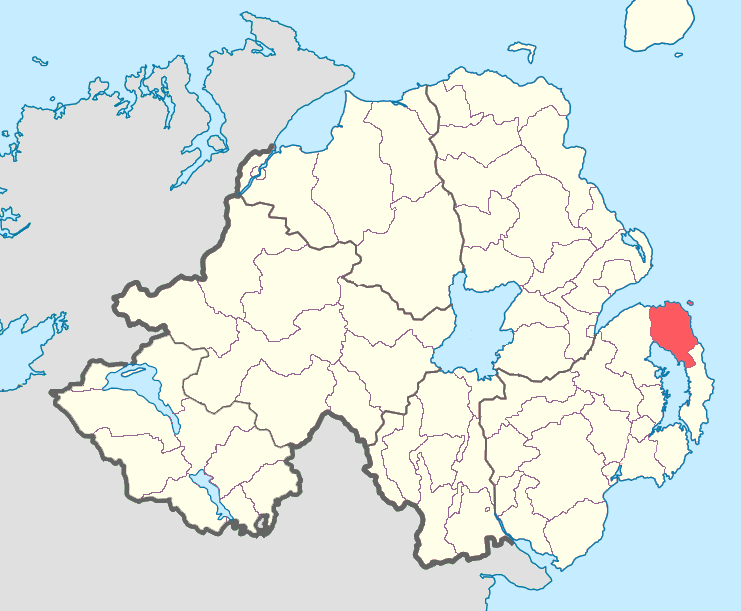
- Location of Ards Lower, County Down, Northern Ireland.
- Coordinates: 54°35′55″N 5°36′17″W
- Sovereign state: United Kingdom
- Country: Northern Ireland
- County: Down

Ards Lower (named after the former barony of Ards), alternatively known as North Ards, is a barony in County Down, Northern Ireland. It lies on the northern half of the Ards Peninsula in the north-east of the county, with the Irish Sea to its east and Strangford Lough to its south-west. It is bordered by two other baronies: Ards Upper to the south; and Castlereagh Lower to the west.

The barony of Ards Lower was created in 1851 when the barony of Ards was split into two, the other part being Ards Upper.

== List of settlements ==
Below is a list of settlements in Ards Lower:

=== Towns ===
- Bangor (also partly in barony of Castlereagh Lower)
- Donaghadee
- Newtownards (also partly in barony of Castlereagh Lower)

=== Villages ===
- Carrowdore
- Conlig
- Greyabbey
- Groomsport
- Millisle

=== Population centres ===
- Clandeboye (split with the barony of Castlereagh Lower)
- Kilcooley

== List of civil parishes ==
Below is a list of civil parishes in Ards Lower:

- Bangor (also partly in barony of Castlereagh Lower)
- Donaghadee
- Greyabbey
- Newtownards (also partly in barony of Castlereagh Lower)
