= Newtownards =

Town in County Down, Northern Ireland

Coordinates: 54.591°N 5.68°W

Newtownards: Irish: Baile Nua na hArda; Scots: Newton or Newtonairds; Ards
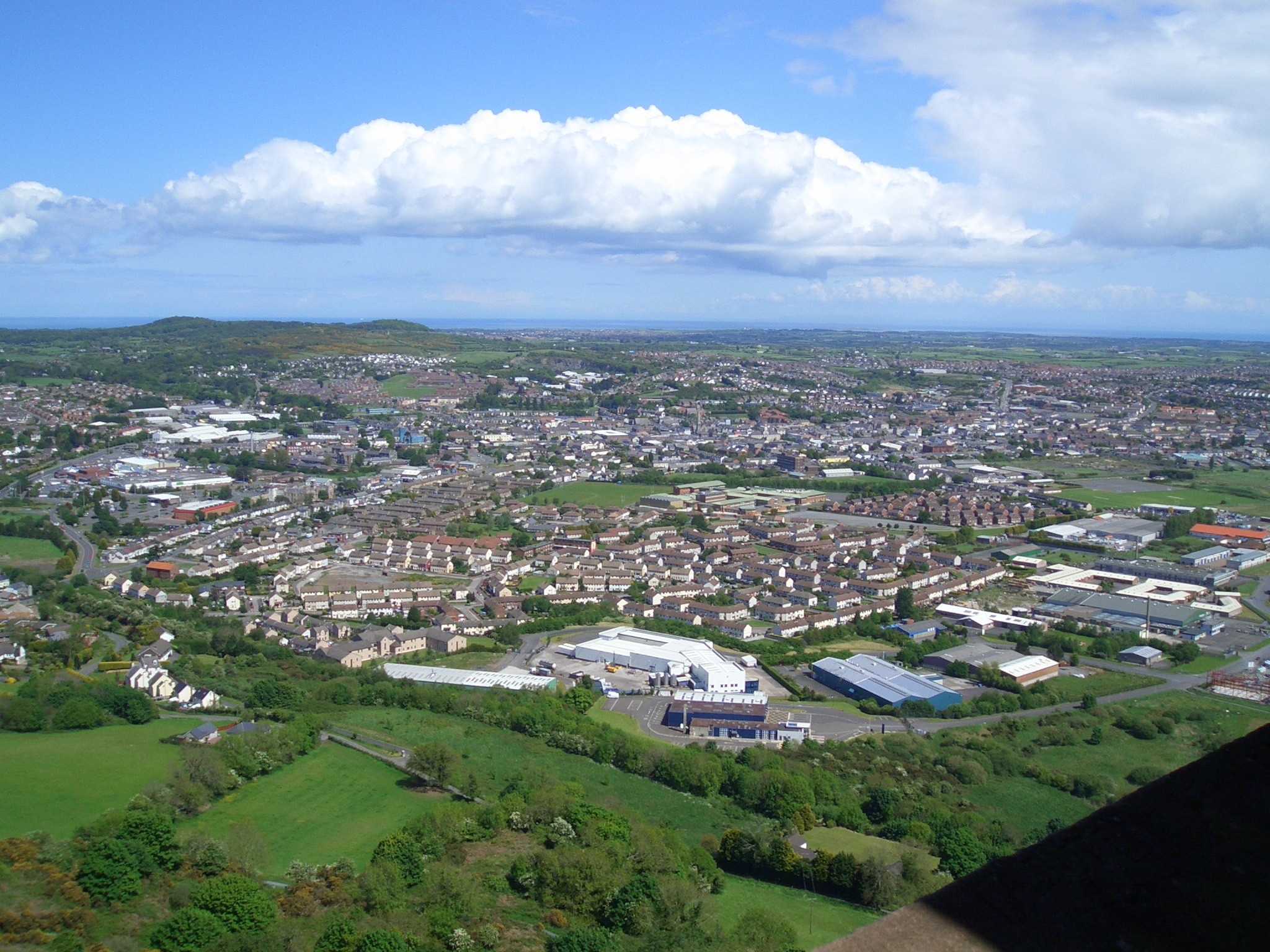
- View of Newtownards from Scrabo Tower

- Location within County Down
- Population: 29,677 (2021 Census)
  - Belfast: 9 mi (14.5 km)
- District: Ards and North Down
- County: County Down
- Country: Northern Ireland
- Sovereign state: United Kingdom
- Post town: NEWTOWNARDS
- Postcode district: BT22, BT23
- Dialling code: 028
- Police: Northern Ireland
- Fire: Northern Ireland
- Ambulance: Northern Ireland
- UK Parliament: Strangford
- NI Assembly: Strangford

Newtownards (/ˌnjuːtənˈɑːrdz/), is a town in County Down, Northern Ireland. It lies at the most northern tip of Strangford Lough, 10 miles (16 km) east of Belfast, on the Ards Peninsula. It is in the civil parish of Newtownards and the historic baronies of Ards Lower and Castlereagh Lower. Newtownards is in the Ards and North Down Borough. The population was 29,677 in the 2021 Census.

== History ==
=== Irish settlement ===
In 540 AD, St. Finian founded Movilla Abbey, a monastery, on a hill overlooking Strangford Lough about a mile northeast of present-day Newtownards town centre. "Movilla" (Magh Bhile) means "the plain of the sacred tree" in Irish, which suggests that the land had previously been a sacred pagan site. It became a significant Christian settlement – a centre for worship, study, mission and commercial trade, well known throughout Ireland. It was sacked by the Vikings sometime after AD 824, though survived for a thousand years as a monastic settlement (becoming part of the Augustinian Order in 1135), until the dissolution of the monasteries in 1542.

The Normans conquered east Ulster in the 1170s, founding the Earldom of Ulster. Around 1226, they established a new town around Movilla, which became known as the "New Town of Blathewic", after the Irish territory of Uí Blathmhaic. A Dominican priory was built in 1244 by Walter de Burgh and was also dissolved in 1542.

In 1572, both monasteries were burned by the Clannaboy O'Neills under Sir Brian McPhelim O'Neill to deny buildings to the English, who were attempting to colonize the Ards. After this the urban settlement at Movilla disappeared and the area around it became known as "Ballylisnevin" ("the town of Nevin's fort").

=== The Scottish town ===
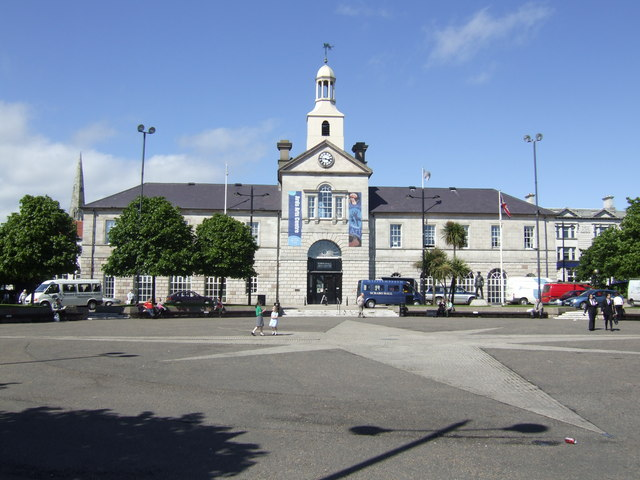
Market House, Newtownards

In 1605 (prior to the official Plantation of Ulster in 1610), Hugh Montgomery was granted the lands and set about rebuilding what was by then known as Newtown, later expanded to Newtownards. Official records show the town was established in 1606. Montgomery built a residence in the ruins of the old priory, the tower of which remains. Scottish Protestant settlers, particularly from Ayr, and to a lesser extent Irvine, in Ayrshire, arrived in large numbers and the town grew quickly.

Due to the shallow mud of Strangford Lough, Newtown never developed as a port, with goods instead transported from the nearby town of Donaghadee on the Irish Sea coast of the Ards Peninsula. Instead, it became a market town, with the Market House in Conway Square constructed in 1771.

=== United Irishmen rebellion ===
North Down and the Ards were briefly held by United Irish insurgents in the Irish Rebellion of 1798. On the morning of 9 June, "Pike Sunday", United Irishmen, mainly from Bangor, Donaghadee, Greyabbey and Ballywalter, under the command of the Presbyterian licentiate (later American diplomat) David Bailie Warden, marched on the town. They were driven off with musket fire from the Market House, but the garrison, consisting of troops from the York Fencible Regiment of Foot subsequently withdrew, allowing the rebels to establish a French revolutionary-style Committee of Public Safety. The "Republic" in Newtownards did not survive the rout two days later of the main rebel force at Ballynahinch.

=== The Great Famine ===
During the Great Famine, which resulted from the dependence of small tenants and cottiers on a blighted potato crop, the largest local landowner, Lord Londonderry, rejected the call for rent reductions on grounds of "personal inconvenience". By 1847 the 800 inhabitants of the town were witness to "emaciated and half-famished souls" queuing at soup kitchens and overflowing the newly built workhouse. Despite Lord Londonderry's objection, several public works programs for famine relief were initiated beginning with the upgrading of the road to Donaghadee. In general, with tenant holdings not as acutely subdivided as in western districts of Ireland, and with the availability of weaving and other employments, the town was saved from the worst.

=== Victorian growth ===
The early 19th century saw the reclamation of the marshlands south of the town. At the same time, its growth was accelerated by integration into the Belfast and Lagan Valley industrial region and market. The Belfast and County Down Railway connected Newtownards to Belfast, via Comber and Dundonald, in 1850 (closed in 1950), and to Donaghadee in 1861. By the same year, the town's population had risen to 9,500. On 12 July 1867, despite the Party Processions Acts, the Orange Order paraded from Bangor to Newtownards. The parade, in which upwards of 30,000 took part, led to the short-term imprisonment of its principal organiser William Johnston, and to his subsequent election as an MP for Belfast.

As the nineteenth century progressed the economy became increasingly tied to the growth of Belfast. From mid-20th century it increasingly became a commuter town. Newtownards' population reached 13,100 in 1961 and had doubled to 28,000 by 2011.

=== The Troubles ===
During the Troubles, Newtownards was the scene of a car bomb attack on 5 July 1993, when Roma's Bar in Regent Street was targeted. The pub was destroyed, but has since been rebuilt. The attack was carried out by the Provisional Irish Republican Army (PIRA) with a 700 kg (1,500 lb) device. There were no fatalities. Police said the 10-minute warning, telephoned to a local radio station, was "totally inadequate." The warning said the bomb contained 1,500 pounds of explosives.

=== Recent times ===
On 1 November 2021, a bus in the town was hijacked and set on fire by two masked assailants allegedly protesting the Northern Ireland Protocol.

== Places of interest ==
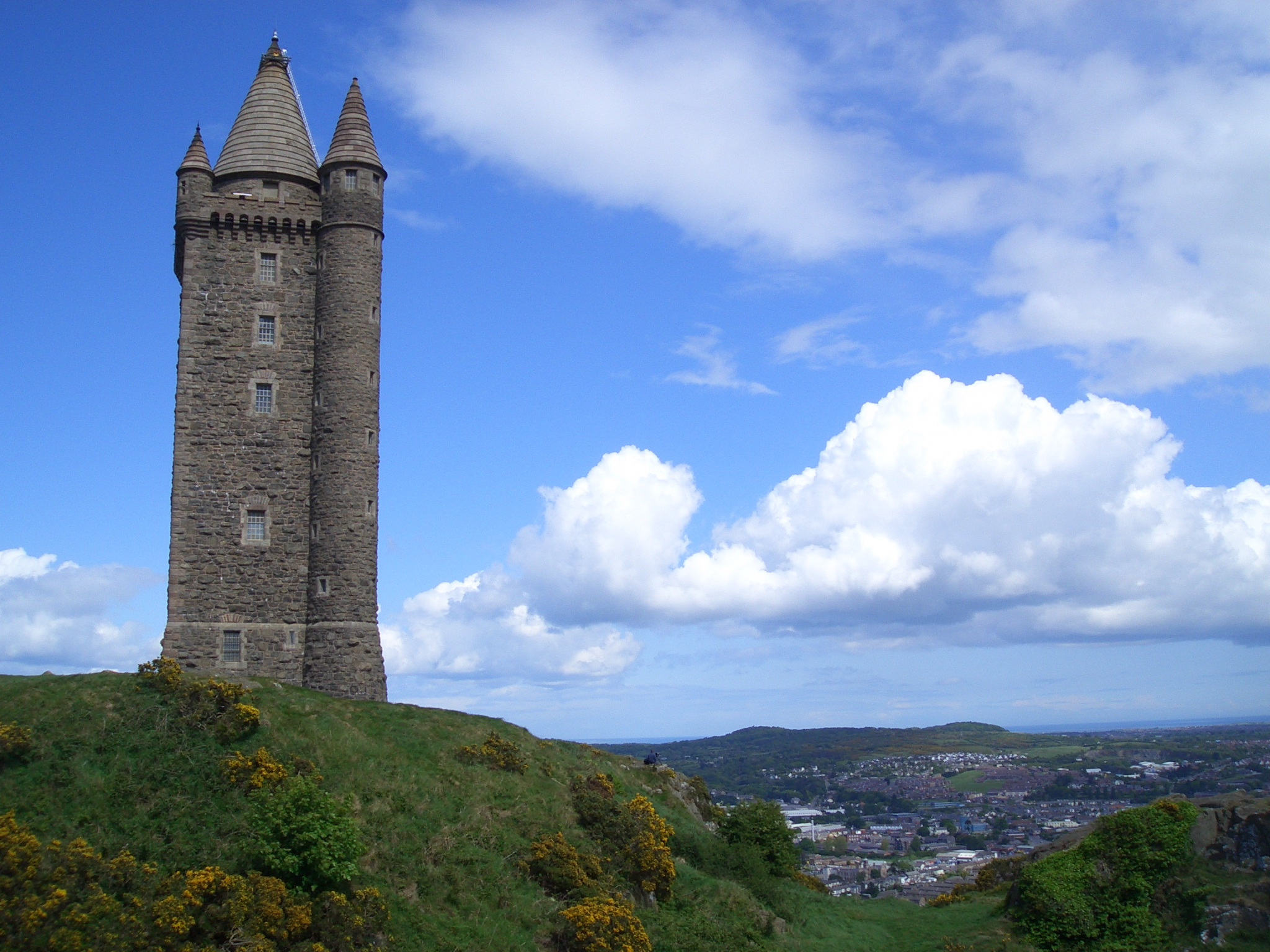
Scrabo Tower (with Newtownards in the background)

=== Scrabo Tower ===
The town of Newtownards is overlooked by the 100-foot (30 m) high Scrabo Tower. The tower is 41 metres high, and was erected on Scrabo Hill as a memorial to Charles Stewart, 3rd Marquess of Londonderry in 1857. Those loyal to the Stewart family suggested the inspiration lay in the gratitude of his tenantry for his solicitude during the famine. Given the popular criticism the Marquess in those years, this seems doubtful. In 1847 he and his wife made contributions of £20 and £10 to their local relief committees. The following year they expended £15,000 renovating their home in Mount Stewart. Only 450 subscribers were connected to the estate on which there were 1,200 tenants farmers and many associated employees. Two-thirds of the cost was met by 98 subscribers (on a list headed by Emperor Napoleon III of France), most of whom were fellow gentry.

The Scottish baronial-style tower is open to the public and houses a historical and local environment exhibition. The basalt-topped sandstone hill at Scrabo is one of the dominant features of north Down. The tower now stands in Scrabo Country Park with its woodland walks and parkland through Killynether Wood.

=== Movilla Abbey ===
The ancient ruins of Movilla Abbey, monastic settlement are situated within the grounds of Movilla Cemetery. Nothing visible remains today of Finnian's original Celtic Abbey, but the 15th Century Augustinian ruins still stand, and are worth seeing. They are a part of the St Patrick's Trail Tourist Route.

=== Somme Heritage Centre ===
The Somme Heritage Centre, which is situated a little north of the town, is the Somme Association's flagship project. Situated adjacent to the Clandeboye Estate outside Newtownards, the centre is a unique visitor attraction of international significance showing the reality of the Great War and its effects on the community at home. The centre commemorates the involvement of the 36th (Ulster) and 16th (Irish) divisions in the Battle of the Somme, the 10th (Irish) Division in Gallipoli, Salonika and Palestine, and provides displays and information on the entire Irish contribution to the First World War.

=== Mount Stewart ===
On the east shore of Strangford Lough, a few miles outside Newtownards and near Greyabbey, stands Mount Stewart, an 18th-century house and garden – the home of the Londonderry family. The house and its contents reflect the history of the Londonderrys who played a leading role in British social and political life. The ninety-eight acre garden at Mount Stewart has been proposed as a UNESCO World Heritage Site.

== Town Twinning ==
- Newtownards has a sister city of Peoria, Arizona in the United States.

== Demography ==
Historical population
Year	Pop.	±%
1821	3,332	—
1831	4,442	+33.3%
1841	6,721	+51.3%
1851	9,566	+42.3%
1861	9,542	−0.3%
1871	9,562	+0.2%
1881	8,676	−9.3%
1891	9,197	+6.0%
1901	9,110	−0.9%
1911	9,587	+5.2%
1926	10,149	+5.9%
1937	19,546	+92.6%
1951	12,243	−37.4%
1961	13,083	+6.9%
1966	12,929	−1.2%
1971	15,484	+19.8%
1981	20,531	+32.6%
1991	24,301	+18.4%
2001	27,821	+14.5%
2011	28,050	+0.8%
2021	29,677	+5.8%

=== 2021 Census ===
On Census Day (21 March 2021) the usually resident population of Newtownards was 29,677. Of these:

- 8.70% belong to or were brought up Catholic Christian and 70.97% belong to or were brought up 'Protestant and other (non-Catholic) Christian (including Christian related)'.
- 72.17% indicated that they had a British national identity, 5.91% had an Irish national identity and 39.29% had a Northern Irish national identity. Respondents could indicate more than one national identity

=== 2011 Census ===
On Census Day (27 March 2011) the usually resident population of Newtownards was 28,050 accounting for 1.55% of the NI total. Of these:

- 98.67% were from the white (including Irish Traveller) ethnic group.
- 8.32% belong to or were brought up Catholic Christian and 79.35% belong to or were brought up 'Protestant and other (non-Catholic) Christian (including Christian related)'.
- 76.37% indicated that they had a British national identity, 4.86% had an Irish national identity and 31.39% had a Northern Irish national identity. Respondents could indicate more than one national identity

== Sport ==
Rugby

Ards Rugby Football Club plays at Lansdowne Road, south of the town along the main Comber road.

Cricket

Ards and Donaghadee Cricket Club currently plays its home games at Londonderry Park, which is on Portaferry Road.

Football

There are two local football teams: Ards F.C., who play in the NIFL's Danske Bank Premiership, and Ards Rangers F.C., who play in the Northern Amateur Football League.

Ards motor racing Circuit

The Ards Circuit through Newtownards was a motorsport street circuit used for RAC Tourist Trophy sports car races from 1928 until 1936. At the time it was Northern Ireland's premier sporting event, regularly attracting crowds in excess of a quarter of a million people.

On 5 September 1936, in appallingly wet conditions, local driver Jack Chambers lost control of his Riley approaching the Strangford Arms in Newtownards at the Newtownards rail bridge and crashed into the crowd, killing eight spectators. This tragedy brought an end to nine years of racing over the Ards street circuit.

== Notable natives/residents ==
- Christine Bleakley (born 1979), television presenter known for her work on ITV, was raised in Newtownards
- Harry Cavan (1916-2000), senior VP of FIFA (1980–90), and president of the Irish Football Association from 1958 to 1994.
- Sir Robert Colville (1625-1697), politician and landowner, owned much property in and near Newtownards.
- Celia de Fréine (born 1948), dramatist and poet, was born in the town and later moved to Dublin and Galway.
- Jason Dunkerley (born 1977), Canadian five-time paralympic medalist, was born and raised in Newtownards. His family emigrated to Canada when he was 14.
- Nick Earls (born 1963), a novelist born in the area; he later moved to Brisbane, Australia.
- Eddie Irvine (born 1965), racing driver and runner-up in the 1999 Formula One World Championship for Ferrari, was born and lived in Conlig, near Newtownards.
- Martyn Irvine (born 1985), former World Cycling Champion and two-time silver medallist, is from the town.
- William Jackson (1737–1795), political journalist, secret contact between the United Irishmen and the French Republic.
- Steven Kane (born 1980), racing driver
- Michael Legge (born 1968), stand-up comedian, was born and raised in the town.
- Alex Lightbody (born 1966), former Northern Ireland, Irish and British open lawn bowls singles champion
- Robert Blair "Paddy" Mayne (1915-1955), SAS co-founder, was born and lived in Newtownards and attended Regent House Grammar School. A bronze statue of him stands outside the town hall. He played rugby for Ireland and for the Lions in the 1938 British Lions tour to South Africa.
- Barry McClements (born 2001), Commonwealth Games para swimming medallist
- Rhys McClenaghan (born 1999), Irish international gymnast, 2020 Tokyo Olympic pommel horse finalist, 2024 Paris Olympic gold medalist, was born and lives in Newtownards.
- Colin Nixon (born 1978), former football player who managed Ards, is from Newtownards.
- Ricky Warwick (born 1966), best known as the frontman for the Scottish band The Almighty, is from the town.
- Thomas Watters (1840-1901), British diplomat and scholar

== See also ==
- Ards Community Hospital
- Newtownards (civil parish)
- Market houses in Northern Ireland
- List of civil parishes of County Down
- List of localities in Northern Ireland by population
