= Ravara =

Townland in Northern Ireland

Coordinates: 54°29′12″N 5°48′1″W

Ravara: Irish: Ráth Bhearach
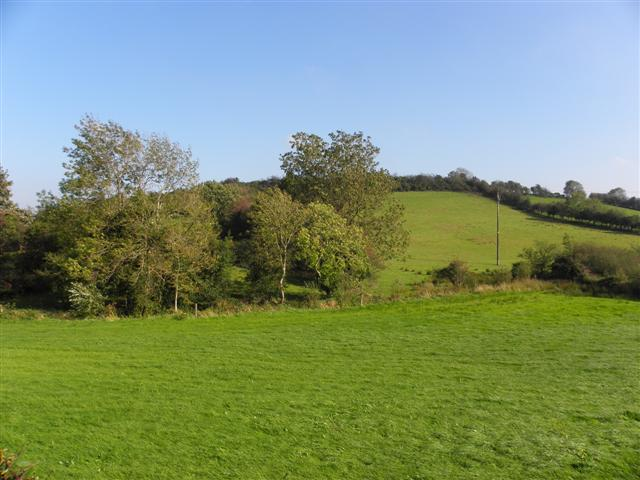
- Ravara fields 2011

- Location within County Down
- Area: 1.94 sq mi (5.0 km^{2})
  - Belfast: 8 mi (12.9 km)
- County: County Down
- Country: Northern Ireland
- Sovereign state: United Kingdom
- Post town: NEWTOWNARDS
- Postcode district: BT23
- Dialling code: 028

Ravara (from Irish Ráth Bhearach 'fort of heifers') is a rural townland in County Down, Northern Ireland. It has an area of 1242.98 acres (5.03 km^{2}). It is situated in the civil parish of Killinchy and the historic barony of Castlereagh Lower, located just south of Ballygowan. It lies within the Ards and North Down Borough Council.

== Demography ==
=== 1659 Census ===
In 1659 the population of Ravara was 12.

- 100%(12) were Irish

=== 1901 Census ===
On Census Day (Sunday 31 March 1901) the population of Ravara was 269 from 63 households.

- 47.2%(127) Male
- 52.8%(142) Female

- 31.2%(84) reported Catholic
- 66.5%(179) were Protestant
- 0.4%(1) reported as attending the Church of Ireland or the Irish Church
- 66.2%(178) reported Presbyterian
- 2.2%(6) reported as other

=== 1911 Census ===
On Census Day (1 May 1911) the population of Ravara was 331 from 70 households(excluding 4 uninhabited houses).

- 52.9%(175) Male
- 47.1%(156) Female

- 19.3%(64) reported Catholic
- 78.3%(259) reported Presbyterian
- 2.4%(8) reported as other

=== 1951 Census ===
On Census Day (Midnight of 8–9 April 1951) the population of Ravara was 372 from 104 households.

- 50.5%(188) Male
- 49.5%(184) Female

=== Religion ===
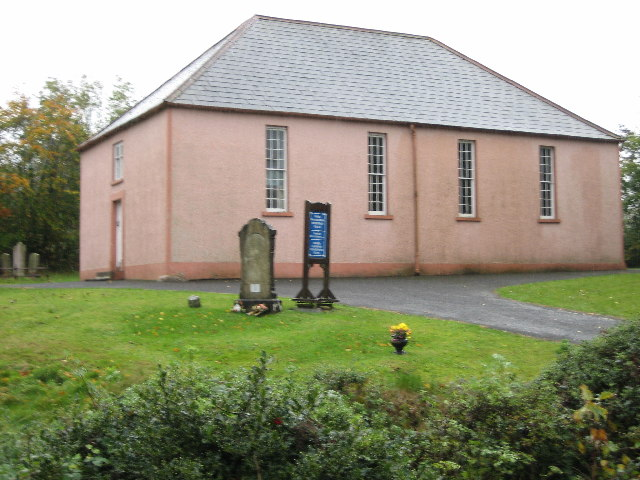
Ravara Non-subscribing Presbyterian Church

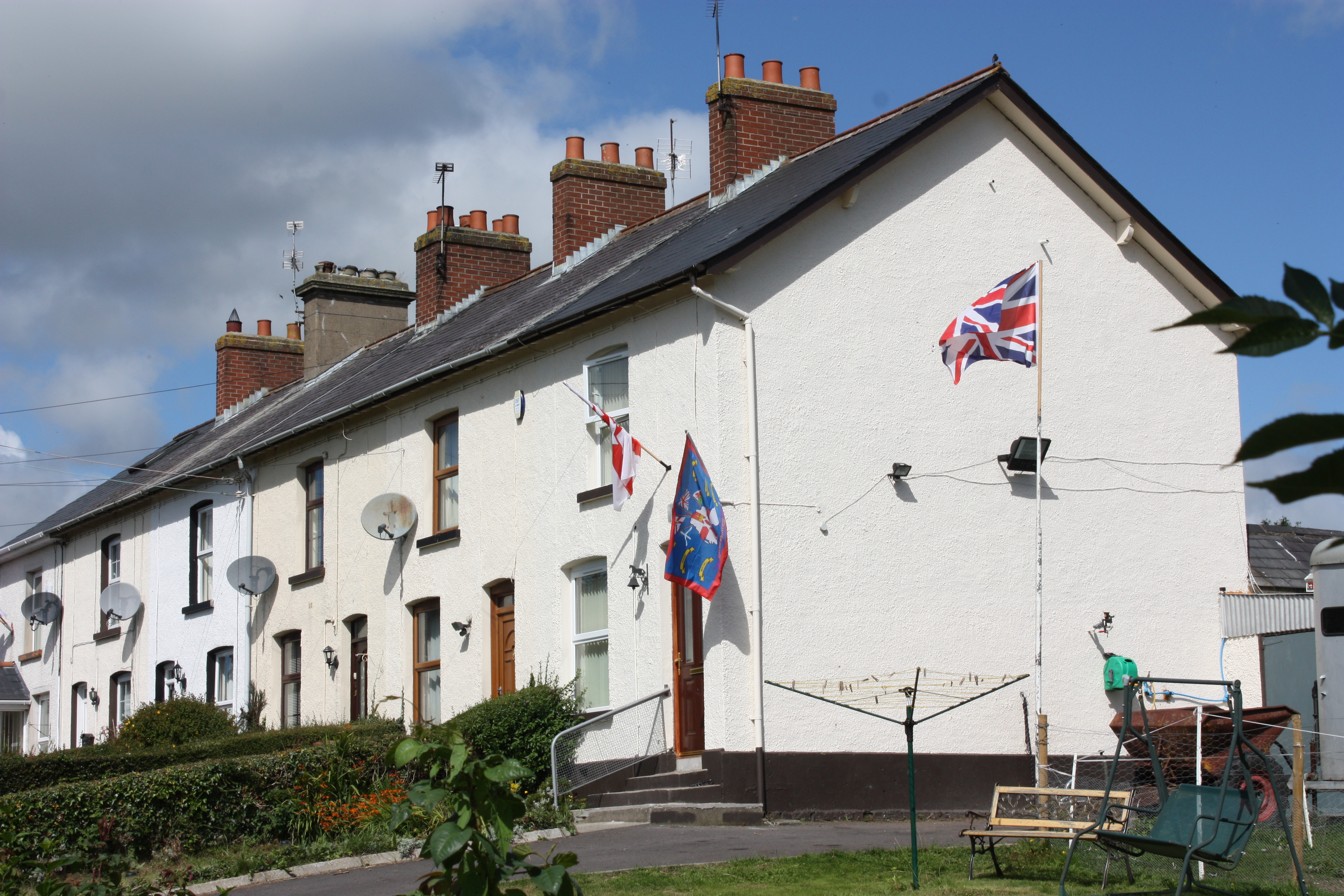
Ravara Road displayed with Loyalist flags 2010

According to the 1911 Census of the Religious professions of the inhabitants of Ravara are as follows:

- 78.3%(259) Presbyterian
- 19.3%(64) Roman Catholic
- 2.4%(8) 'Other Persuasions'

There is just one church in the townland of Ravara, this being the Ravara Non-subscribing Presbyterian Church. This church, both congregation and building, was founded in 1837. The church building is located just 0.5 miles south of Ballygowan along the Saintfield Road(A21). The current Minister is Rev. Alistier Bell.

The Manse of Ballygowan Presbyterian Church was Ravara House from around 1865-1980. The road which the Manse was once on is still called the 'Manse Road' despite the Manse of Ballygowan Presbyterian Church now being The Burn Road in Magherascouse.

== See also ==
- List of townlands in County Down
