= Magherascouse =

Townland in County Down, Northern Ireland

Coordinates: 54°30′36″N 5°46′00″W

Magherascouse: Irish: Machaire Scamha
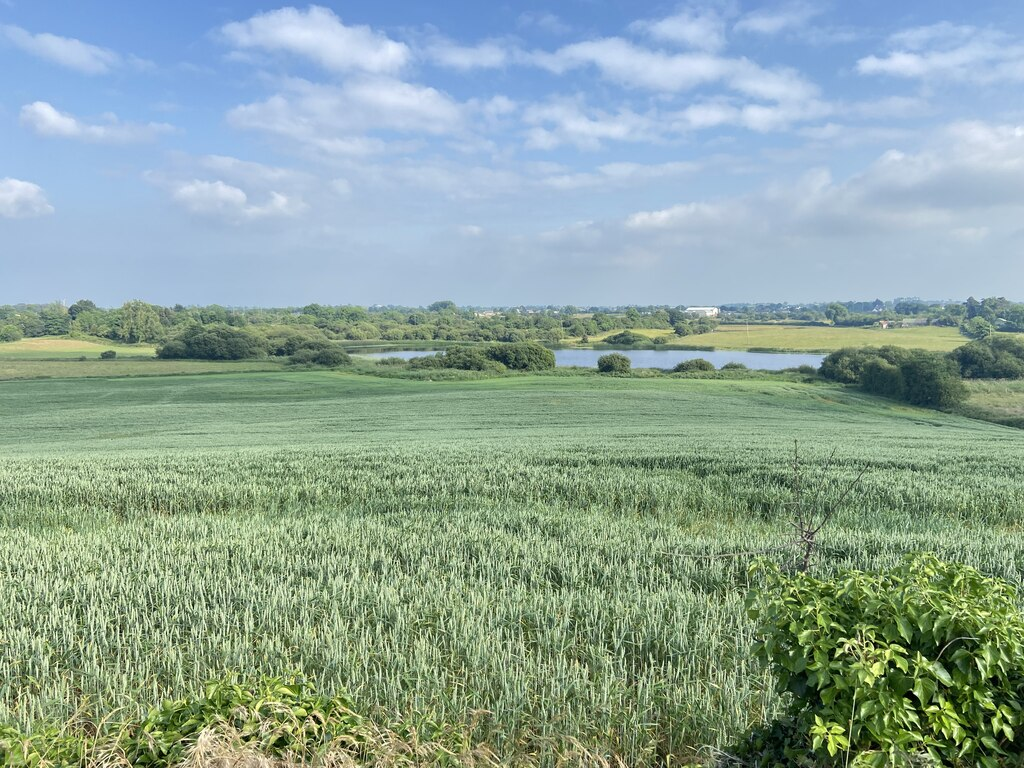
- Magherascouse Lough 2023

- Location within County Down
- Area: 2.01 sq mi (5.2 km^{2})
- Population: 239 (2021 Census)
  - Density: 119/sq mi (46/km^{2})
- Irish grid reference: J 44676 64696
  - Belfast: 9 mi (14.5 km)
- District: Ards and North Down
- County: County Down
- Country: Northern Ireland
- Sovereign state: United Kingdom
- Post town: NEWTOWNARDS
- Postcode district: BT23
- Dialling code: 028
- Police: Northern Ireland
- Fire: Northern Ireland
- Ambulance: Northern Ireland
- UK Parliament: Strangford
- NI Assembly: Strangford

Magherascouse (/ˈmækrəˌskuːs/ MACK-rə-SKOOSE, from Irish: Machaire Scamha, meaning "Plain of the bare patch of rocks") is a rural townland near Ballygowan in County Down, Northern Ireland. It has an area of 1286.45 acres (5.206 km^{2}). It is situated in the civil parish of Comber, the Poor Law Union of Newtownards and the historic barony of Castlereagh Lower, 2 miles (3.2 km) south of the town of Comber. It lies within the electoral division of Ballygowan which is part of the Ards and North Down Borough Council.

== Toponomy ==
Magherascouse is the anglicised form of a much older Irish name, Machaire Scamha. The first element of the place name means ‘plain’. The most plausible explanation for the final element is likely a form of the word scamh, which is related to the word scamhach, scafach which is defined by Niall Ó Dónaill's Irish-English dictionary Foclóir Gaeilge-Béarla, as ‘bare patch of rock’. All the earlier spellings suggest that the original form of the place name was Machaire Scamha meaning ‘plain of the bare patch of rocks’. The absence of final 's' in the earliest spellings (first appearing as Maghrescows c. 1659) seems to suggest that the final element is scamh rather than sceamhas and the modern final 's' seems to indicate an English plural form, suggesting that the townland may have formerly been made up of multiple portions.

== History ==
Before the early 17th century Plantation of Ulster, when many Lowland Scots moved across the Irish Sea to settle in north-east Ireland on lands granted by King James VI to James Hamilton and Hugh Montgomery, the area of Magherascouse was sparsely inhabited by Irish Gaels. The townland was within the territory of Clandeboye and was inhabited by the tribe of Henry Caoch O'Neill the Blind, a member of the Clannaboy O'Neill family who was blinded in 1426 by the sons of Brian Ballagh O'Neill, his brother. In the Irish Rebellion of 1798 a man of the name, Nevin Kerns from Magherascouse participated in the Battle of Saintfield.

In 1837 the proprietor was Lord Dufferin whose agent was Mr Reid of Killyleagh. Farms were from 10 to 30 acres, the land quality was described as "middling" and rent was 21- 32 shillings an acre. On 10 September 1858 the B&CDR opened a railway line from Comber to Ballynahinch and it passed through Magherascouse, occupying a total area of 8.91 acres (0.036 km^{2}) for the railway, a nearby station being Ballygowan railway station. The railway line was originally set to pass closer to Strangford Lough, through Killinchy and Killyleagh but after a new Act of Parliament in 1855 the route was changed to pass through the villages of Saintfield, Ballygowan and Crossgar. The terrain from Ballygowan to Comber required many rock cuttings, the most notable of which being known as 'the gullet', part of which passed through Magherascouse.

Lord Dufferin sold the townland of Magherascouse to Robert G. Dunville in 1877, and was valued at £1,341 in 1881. Dunville still owned the townland in 1889. From the mid-19th century through the early 20th century the population of Magherascouse declined considerably as many people emigrated to North America or found work in Comber, Saintfield and particularly in Belfast. In the late 1940s Willie Cooke from Magherascouse worked at the Ballygowan station and one of his jobs was to open and close the level crossing gates at the station, near Victoria Square in the village. Cooke is said to have seen a ghost train whilst cycling to his shift. The railway line which passed through Magherascouse was closed by the Ulster Transport Authority on 15 January 1950.

== Geography ==
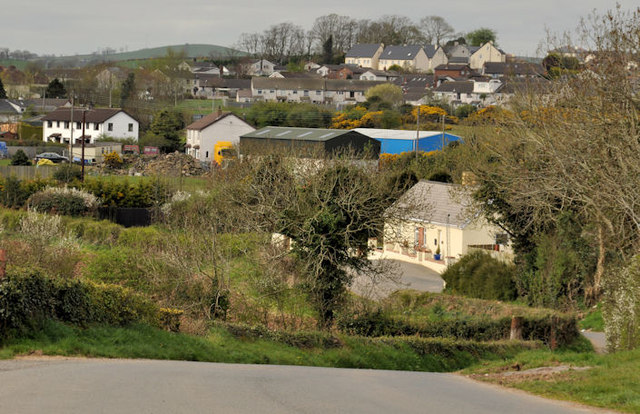
Magherascouse Road facing Ballygowan

Magherascouse is a rural townland near Ballygowan in County Down, Northern Ireland. It has an area of 1286.45 acres (5.206 km^{2}). It is situated in the civil parish of Comber, the Poor Law Union of Newtownards and the historic barony of Castlereagh Lower, located 2 miles south of Comber. It lies within the Electoral Division of Ballygowan which is part of the Ards and North Down Borough Council. Within County Down it is the 39th largest townland and it borders nine other townlands including Ballygowan, Ballykeel, Ballynichol, Ballyrush, Ballywilliam, Carrickmannon, Drumhirk, Drumreagh and Tullynagee. Magherascouse contains part of the Moneygreer bog on the south side of the townland. Magherascouse contains a lough of about 11 acres (0.04452 km^{2}) near the centre of the townland roughly 5 kilometres south of Comber.

== Demography ==
The population of Magherascouse declined a considerable amount in the first half of the 20th century as people moved away and found jobs in nearby towns and cities such as Comber, Saintfield and particularly Belfast. Magherascouse lies across four census data zones, these being Comber_F2, Comber_F3, Comber_H2 and a very small amount of Comber_G1. It borders Comber_E2 for 23 metres and Comber_G1 for 261 metres. The three main data zones have a combined area of 7472.467 acres (30.24 km^{2}) with an average population density of 0.46 and a combined population of 1390 from 539 households. The townland has a very large ethnicity and English speaking population, a minority of which have knowledge in Ulster Scots and a small percentage have a small ability in Irish. It is a largely Protestant townland with a small percentage being born outside of Northern Ireland. Magherascouse is a mostly Presbyterian townland according to the multiple censuses carried out there, since 1821 a presbyterian Sabbath School had been held and in 1825 the Old and New Testaments were handed out by Mrs. James Clarke and Mrs. J. Carse as well as a Roman Catholic school being built there for the Catholic population.

Historical population
Year	Pop.	±% p.a.
1659	29	—
1837	732	+1.83%
1841	756	+0.81%
1851	635	−1.73%
1861	636	+0.02%
1871	527	−1.86%
1881	483	−0.87%
1891	410	−1.63%
1901	431	+0.50%
1911	353	−1.98%
1926	342	−0.21%
1937	302	−1.12%
1951	310	+0.19%
2021 (est.)	239	−0.37%
Note: Townland populations were no longer documented after the 1951 Census so populations after are estimated Source:

=== 1901 Census ===
On Census Day (Sunday 31 March 1901) the population of Magherascouse was 431 from 81 households (excluding 8 uninhabited houses).

- 49.7%(214) Male
- 50.3%(217) Female
- 8.6%(37) reported Roman Catholic
- 88.9%(383) were Protestant
- 7%(30) reported as attending the Church of Ireland or the Irish Church
- 81.9%(353) reported Presbyterian
- 2.6%(11) reported as other

=== 1911 Census ===
On Census Day (1 May 1911) the population of Magherascouse was 353 from 67 households.

- 48.4%(171) Male
- 51.6%(182) Female
- 15%(53) reported Roman Catholic
- 84.1%(297) were Protestant
- 6.5%(23) reported as attending the Church of Ireland or the Irish Church
- 77.6%(274) reported Presbyterian
- 0.8%(3) reported as other

=== 2021 Census ===
Magherascouse lies across three census data zones, these being Comber_F2, Comber_F3 and Comber_H2 as well as bordering Comber_E2 for 23 metres. These three data zones have a combined area of 7472.467 acres (30.24 km^{2}) with an average population density of 0.46 and a combined population of 1390 from 539 households. 99% of the population are white ethnicity and 99.3% speak English as their main language with 3% having some ability in Irish and 22.3% having some ability in Ulster Scots. 94% being born in Northern Ireland, 0.6% were born in Scotland, 3% were born in England, 1% were born in the Republic of Ireland and another 1% being born in other countries. Magherascouse has an estimated population of 239 from an estimated total of 107 households.

- 51% Male
- 49% Female
- 93.3% Straight or heterosexual
- 1% Gay, lesbian, bisexual or other sexual orientation
- 9.3% Roman Catholic
- 86.6% Protestant and other Christian
- 10.3% Attending the Church of Ireland or the Irish Church
- 49.6% Presbyterian
- 2% Methodist
- 23.3% No religion or not stated
- 1.3% Other

== Education ==
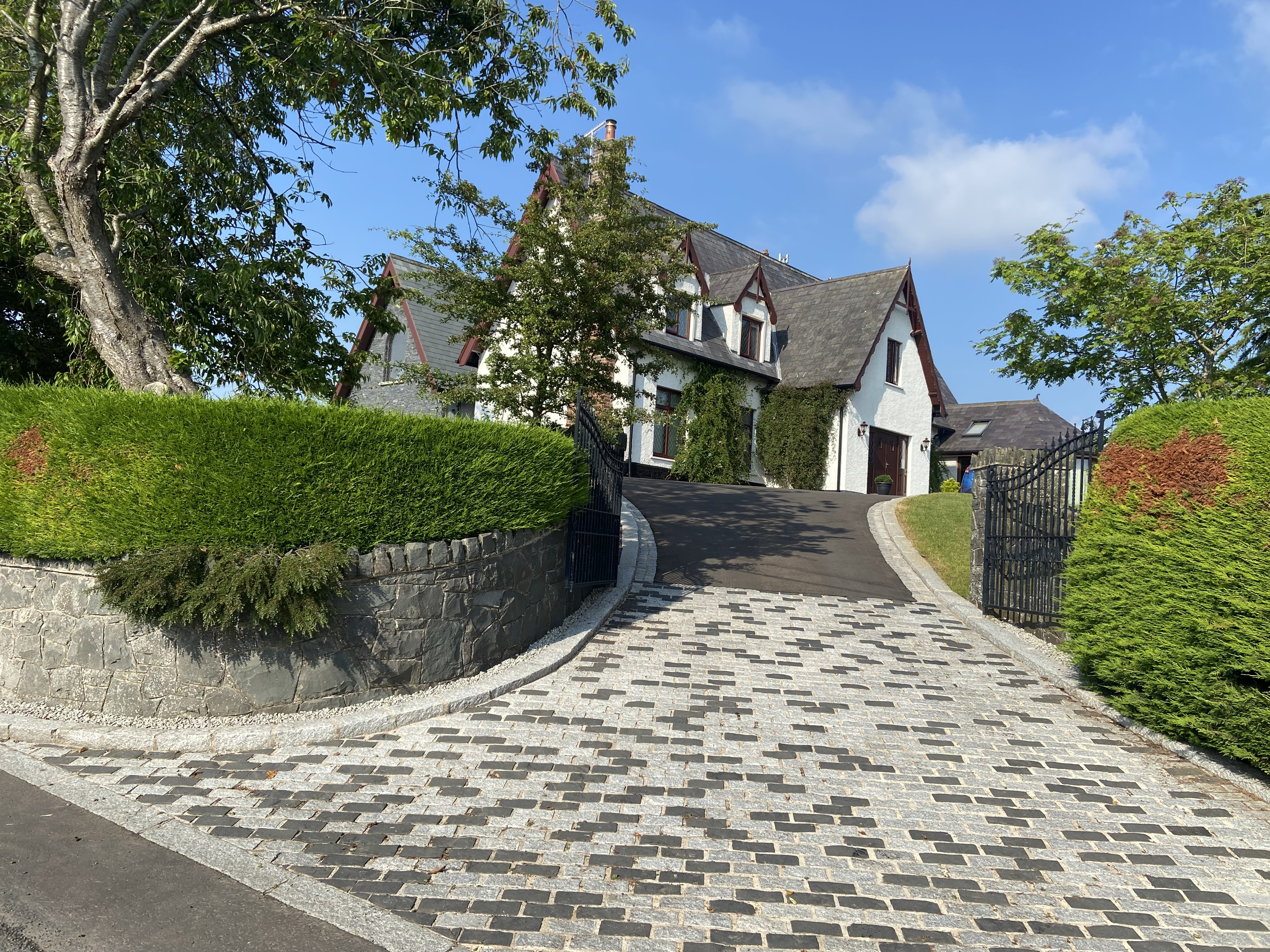
Former Magherascouse Primary School 2023

Magherascouse has had three schools in its history, with two of these schools were around during the early 19th century. After the Stanley letter, which led to the nationalisation of schools in Northern Ireland, one of the schools became known as the Magherascouse School. This school was built in 1820 by Lord Dufferin for the benefit of his tenantry and was in use until at least 1963. This school consisted of Presbyterian students mostly and since 1821 a Sabbath School had been held there. It had a new school building built around the late 19th century to early 20th century which was funded by Lord Dufferin. John Craigan was appointed Head Master in 1885 and was Principal there until at least 1918. After John Craigan the new Headmistress was Miss Mercer who retired when she turned 60, after Miss Mercer the Headmistress then became Miss Corrigan (later Mrs Jack), Miss Corrigan became burdened with leukemia and had to leave the school, a woman of the name Gladys McBride happened to be vice principal nearby in Ballykeigle Primary School and so she became the Headmistress of Magherascouse National School before it was closed, making her the final Headmistress of the school. After closure the school building was put up for sale and was bought as a private residence, which it still is.

The other primary school was St. Mary's School, Burns's Cross, and was built in 1919 by Fr. Shields for the Catholic population in the area and to replace a school in Carrickmannon known as 'The Mill'. St. Mary's cost the Church £45 at the time to construct and was built almost entirely by a local man named James Mitchell who used voluntary labour to reduce the cost of construction. Half an acre of land was donated by the Truman family who owned a farm there at the time. It was built out of locally quarried 'blue stone' from Ballygowan. In the 1920s to the 1940s the Headmistress was Mrs McGaughey.

The third school building was the oldest of the three, and was described in 1898 as a 'hedge school' which existed long before the Magherascouse School. The school was decommissioned shortly after the Stanley letter where it then was temporarily rented to a man named John Lyons as a private dwelling by Daniel McMorran, who owned the farm and fields in which the 'hedge school' sat. After this the building was finally demolished into a heap of rubble and piled into the corner of the field in which it once was, possibly due to the building starting to collapse.

All three schools are now defunct, Magherascouse school now being a private dwelling, St. Mary's School is now privately owned and the third school was demolished.

== See also ==
- List of townlands in County Down
