= Killinchy (civil parish) =

Civil parish in County Down, Northern Ireland

Killinchy Cill Dhuinsi
- civil parish

Irish transcription(s)
  - Derivation: Cill Dhuinsí
  - Meaning: Duinseach’s church
- Sovereign state: United Kingdom
- Country: Northern Ireland
- County: Down
- Barony: Dufferin, Castlereagh Lower, Castlereagh Upper
- Settlements / Townlands: Killinchy, Ballygowan, Balloo; townlands: 35

Killinchy (from Irish Cill Dhuinsí, meaning 'Duinseach’s church') is a civil parish in County Down, Northern Ireland. It is mainly situated in the historic barony of Dufferin, with two smaller portions in the baronies of Castlereagh Upper and Castlereagh Lower.

== Settlements ==
Settlements within Killinchy civil parish include:

- Balloo
- Ballygowan (mostly in civil parish of Comber)
- Killinchy
- Raffrey
- Whiterock

== Townlands ==
Killinchy civil parish contains the following townlands: (Most of the townlands are in the barony of Dufferin, but 5 townlands are in the barony of Castlereagh Lower and 4 in the barony of Castlereagh Upper.)

- Aughnadarragh
- Balloo
- Ballybredagh
- Ballycloghan
- Ballydorn
- Ballygeegan
- Ballygowan
- Ballymacashen
- Ballymacreelly
- Ballymorran
- Barnamaghery
- Bradock Island
- Carrickmannon
- Carrigullian
- Conley Island
- Craigarusky
- Creevybeg
- Darragh Island
- Drumreagh
- Dunsy Island
- Dunsy Rock
- Feehary Island
- Green Island
- Islandbane
- Islandmore
- Killinakin
- Killinchy
- Quarterland
- Raffrey
- Rathgorman
- Ravara
- Ringhaddy
- Shamrock Island
- Tullycore
- Tullymore

== See also ==
- List of civil parishes of County Down
