= Lisbane =

Village in County Down, Northern Ireland

Coordinates: 54°30′12.1618″N 5°42′38.2176″W

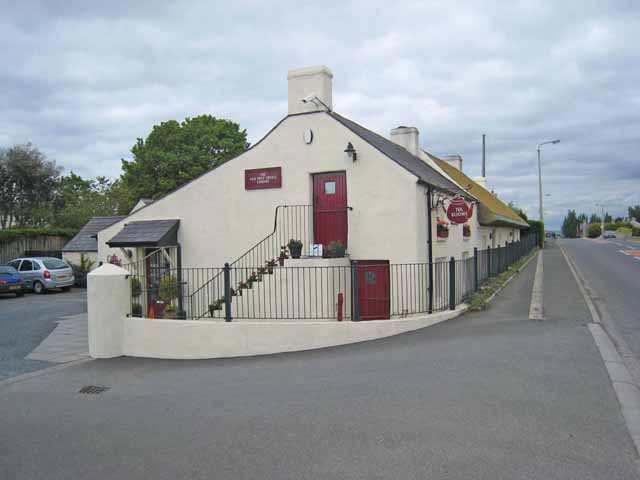
The Old Post Office at Lisbane

Lisbane is a small village and townland in the parish of Tullynakill and the barony of Castlereagh Lower in County Down, Northern Ireland. It is between Balloo and Comber on the A22 road, 5 kilometres south-east of Comber. It is near Strangford Lough in the Ards and North Down Borough Council.

Lisbane had a population of 430 people in the 2011 Census.

The name Lisbane is from the Irish An Lios Bán, meaning 'the white ringfort'. No white fort exists there now. There are ten other Irish townlands named Lisbane, four of them in County Down, including one near Bangor. Although the village is Lisbane, much of the village is situated within the townland of Lisbarnet. The townland of Lisbane is closer to Strangford Lough.

== Notable people ==
- Joshua Burnside, award-winning musician, born in Lisbane
- Andy Bishop, chairman of local football club, Saintfield United
