= List of A22 roads =

This is a list of roads designated A22. Entries are sorted in the countries' alphabetical order.

- A22 motorway (Austria), a road connecting Vienna and the A23 to Stockerau
- A22 road (England), a road connecting London to Eastbourne, East Sussex
- A22 autoroute, a road connecting Paris to Belgium and the low countries through the Roubaix conurbation
- A22 road (Isle of Man), a road connecting Willaston Corner and Union Mills Road
- Autostrada A22 (Italy), a highway connecting Modena and Brennero
- A22 motorway (Cyprus), a future road planned to bypass Nicosia
- A22 motorway (Netherlands), a road connecting the interchange Velsen and the interchange Beverwijk
- A22 road (Northern Ireland), a road connecting Dundonald to Comber in County Down, in Northern Ireland
- A22 motorway (Portugal), a road connecting Lagos with Vila Real de Santo António
- Autovía A-22, a road linking the Spanish cities of Huesca and Lleida which is under construction & partially open
- A22 road (Sri Lanka), a road connecting Passara and Monaragala

== See also ==
- List of highways numbered 22
- List of 22A roads
