= Moneyreagh =

Village in County Down, Northern Ireland

Coordinates: 54°32′N 5°50′W

Moneyreagh: Irish: Mónaidh Riabhach
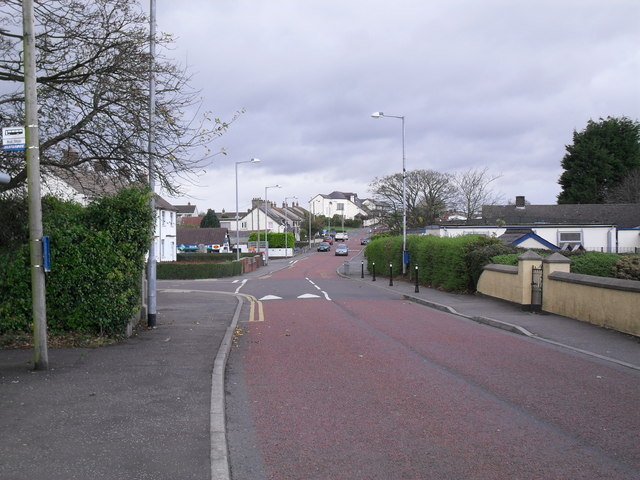
- Moneyreagh Village as seen on Street View in 2009

- Location within County Down
- Population: 1,594 (2021 Census)
- Irish grid reference: J4051266736
- District: Lisburn and Castlereagh
- County: County Down
- Country: Northern Ireland
- Sovereign state: United Kingdom
- Post town: NEWTOWNARDS
- Postcode district: BT23
- Dialling code: 028
- Police: Northern Ireland
- Fire: Northern Ireland
- Ambulance: Northern Ireland
- UK Parliament: Strangford (until 2024) Belfast South and Mid Down (from 2024 General Election)
- NI Assembly: Strangford

Moneyreagh or Moneyrea (from Irish Mónaidh Riabhach, meaning 'grey bog or moor') is a small village and townland in County Down, Northern Ireland. Around 6 miles (10 km) south-east of Belfast city centre, it is just off the main road between Belfast and Ballygowan. It is situated in the civil parish of Comber and the historic barony of Castlereagh Lower. It had a population of 1,594 people in the 2021 Census.

== Demography ==
=== 2011 Census ===
On Census Day, 27 March 2011, the usual resident of the Moneyreagh Settlement was 1,384 (519 households).

- 17.92% were aged under 16 years and 13.37% were aged 65 and over
- 50.29% of the usually resident population were male and 49.71% were female
- 44 was the average (median) age of the population
- 99.71% were from the white (including Irish Traveller) ethnic group
- 2.24% belong to or were brought up as Catholic
- 90.39% belong to or were brought as 'Protestant and other Christian (including Christian related)' religion
- 83.31% indicated that they had a British national identity, 2.53% had an Irish national identity and 29.77% had a Northern Irish national identity.

Respondents could indicate more than one national identity.

==== Language ====
- 1.04% had some knowledge of the Irish Language
- 9.07% had some knowledge of the Ulster Scots Language
- 0.30% did not have English as their first language

== Education ==
=== Primary ===
Moneyreagh has one primary school locally, seen at the top of the table below.

Other schools nearby have been added also.

School name	Location	Distance outside
Moneyrea PS	Moneyreagh	0 mi (0 km)
Alexander Dickson PS	Ballygowan	3.6 mi (5.8 km)
Loughview Integrated PS	Castlereagh	4 mi (6.4 km)
Andrews Memorial PS	Comber	4 mi (6.4 km)

=== Secondary ===
Moneyreagh does not have any secondary schools locally.

Those located nearby (<10 mi (16 km) away) are shown in the table below:

School name	Location	Distance outside	Notes
Lagan College	Castlereagh	4 mi (6.4 km)	
Grosvenor Grammar School	Castlereagh	4.7 mi (7.6 km)	Accessible by public bus route 12/512
Saintfield High School	Saintfield	6.4 mi (10.3 km)	

== Notable people ==
- Fletcher Blakely, opened the first Unitarian church in Ireland at Moneyreagh and is buried there.
- Martin McGaughey, former footballer, played as striker most notably for Linfield F.C..
- Rory McIlroy, golfer, lived near the village until March 2013.

== Transport ==
Moneyreagh is connected to Belfast City Centre by the 12/512 bus route ran by Translink. This route also connects Moneyreagh to the neighbouring small town of Ballygowan.

== See also ==
- List of villages in Northern Ireland
- List of towns in Northern Ireland
