= List of highways numbered 22 =

Route 22, or Highway 22, can refer to:

== International ==
- E22 European route E22

== Argentina ==
- National Route 22

== Australia ==
- Great Western Highway, Parramatta Road

== Austria ==
- Donauufer Autobahn

== Canada ==
- Alberta Highway 22
  - Alberta Highway 22X
- British Columbia Highway 22
- Manitoba Highway 22
- Nova Scotia Trunk 22
- Ontario Highway 22
- Prince Edward Island Route 22
- Saskatchewan Highway 22

== China ==
- G22 Expressway

== Costa Rica ==
- National Route 22

== Cuba ==
- Highway I–22
  - Highway 3–I–22
  - Highway 3–I–22
- Highway 1–22

== Czech Republic ==
- I/22 Highway; Czech: Silnice I/22

== Finland ==
- Finnish national road 22

== Greece ==
- EO22 road

== Iceland ==
- Route 22 (Iceland)

== India ==
- National Highway 22 (India)

== Iran ==
- Road 22

== Ireland ==
- N22 road (Ireland)

== Israel ==
- Highway 22 (Israel)

== Italy ==
- Autostrada A22

== Japan ==
- Japan National Route 22

== Korea, South ==
- National Route 22
- Gukjido 22

== Malaysia ==
- Senai–Desaru Expressway
- FT 22 Malaysia Federal Route 22

== New Zealand ==
- State Highway 22

== Paraguay ==
- National Route 22

== United Kingdom ==
- British A22 (Eastbourne-London)
- M22 motorway (Northern Ireland)
- A22 road (Northern Ireland)

== United States ==
- Interstate 22
- U.S. Route 22
- Alabama State Route 22
  - County Route 22 (Lee County, Alabama)
- Arkansas Highway 22
- California State Route 22
  - County Route A22 (California)
  - County Route J22 (California)
  - County Route S22 (California)
- Colorado State Highway 22
- Connecticut Route 22
- Florida State Road 22
  - County Road 22 (Gulf County, Florida)
  - County Road 22 (Liberty County, Florida)
  - County Road 22 (Wakulla County, Florida)
- Georgia State Route 22
- Hawaii Route 22 (former)
- Idaho State Highway 22
- Illinois Route 22
- Indiana State Road 22
- Iowa Highway 22
- K-22 (Kansas highway)
- Kentucky Route 22
- Louisiana Highway 22
- Maine State Route 22
- Maryland Route 22
- Massachusetts Route 22
- M-22 (Michigan highway)
- Minnesota State Highway 22
  - County Road 22 (Chisago County, Minnesota)
  - County Road 22 (Hennepin County, Minnesota)
  - County Road 22 (Washington County, Minnesota)
- Missouri Route 22
- Nebraska Highway 22
- Nevada State Route 22 (former)
- New Jersey Route 22 (former)
  - County Route C22 (Bergen County, New Jersey)
  - County Route 22 (Monmouth County, New Jersey)
  - County Route 22 (Ocean County, New Jersey)
- New Mexico State Road 22
- New York State Route 22
  - New York State Route 22B
  - County Route 22 (Chautauqua County, New York)
  - County Route 22 (Chenango County, New York)
  - County Route 22 (Columbia County, New York)
  - County Route 22 (Dutchess County, New York)
  - County Route 22 (Genesee County, New York)
  - County Route 22 (Greene County, New York)
  - County Route 22 (Oneida County, New York)
  - County Route 22 (Orange County, New York)
  - County Route 22 (Oswego County, New York)
  - County Route 22 (Otsego County, New York)
  - County Route 22 (Putnam County, New York)
  - County Route 22 (Saratoga County, New York)
  - County Route 22 (Schoharie County, New York)
  - County Route 22 (Schuyler County, New York)
  - County Route 22 (St. Lawrence County, New York)
  - County Route 22 (Suffolk County, New York)
  - County Route 22 (Ulster County, New York)
- North Carolina Highway 22
- North Dakota Highway 22
- Ohio State Route 22 (1923-1927) (former)
- Oklahoma State Highway 22
- Oregon Route 22
- Pennsylvania Route 22 (1920s) (former)
- South Carolina Highway 22
- South Dakota Highway 22
- Tennessee State Route 22
- Texas State Highway 22
  - Texas State Highway Spur 22
  - Farm to Market Road 22
  - Texas Park Road 22
- Utah State Route 22
- Virginia State Route 22
  - Virginia State Route 22 (1918-1933) (former)
- Washington State Route 22
  - Primary State Highway 22 (Washington) (former)
- Wisconsin Highway 22
- Wyoming Highway 22

Territories

- Puerto Rico Highway 22

== Vietnam ==
- National Route 22

== See also ==
- List of A22 roads
- List of highways numbered 22A

| Preceded by 21 | Lists of highways 22 | Succeeded by 23 |
