= A21 road (Northern Ireland) =

Road in Northern Ireland

Coordinates: 54.50568°N 5.78563°W

A21

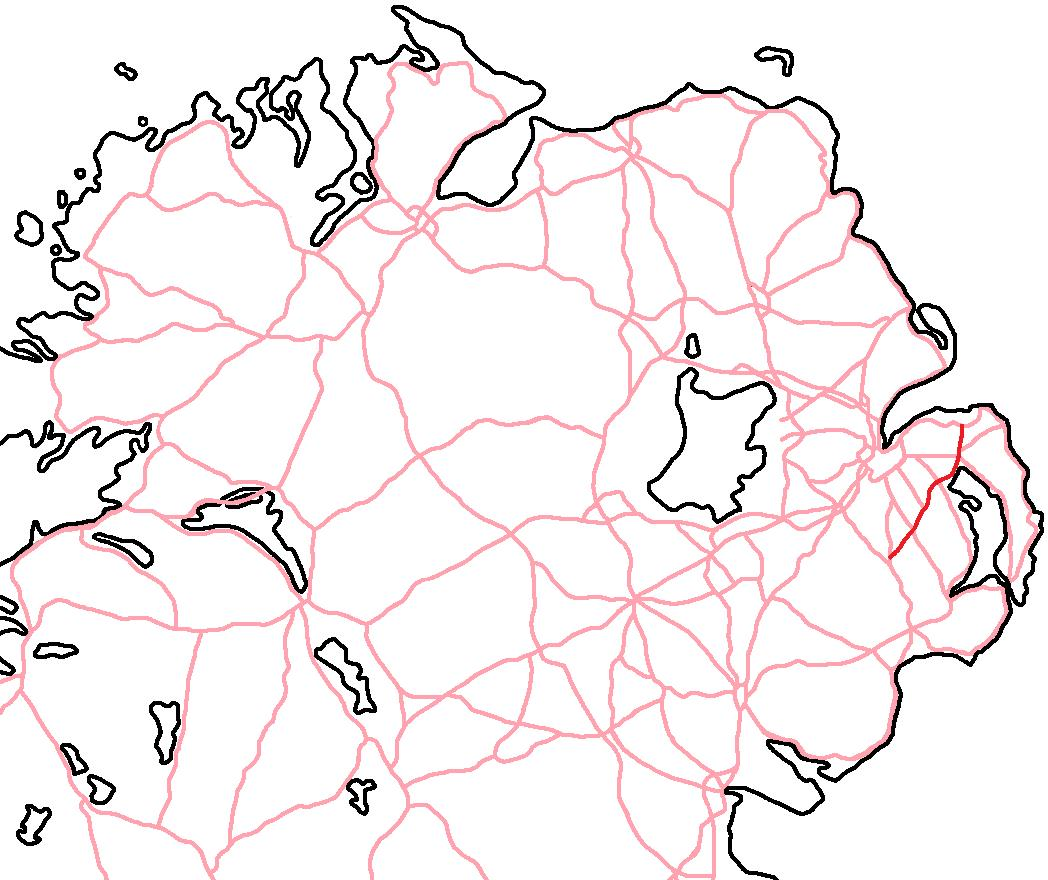
- The route of the A21 in red from Bangor to Ballynahinch.

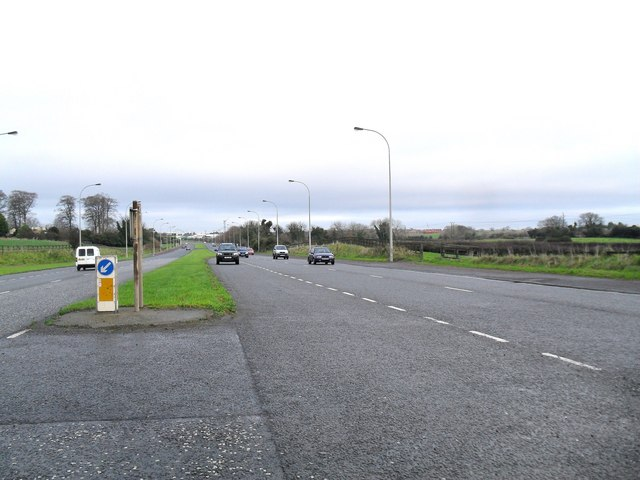
- A21 Newtownards Road at Conlig

Location
- Country: United Kingdom
- Constituent country: Northern Ireland
- Primary destinations: Bangor Newtownards Comber Ballygowan Saintfield Ballynahinch

Road network
- Roads in Northern Ireland; Motorways; A roads in Northern Ireland

The A21, also Comber road, is a road in County Down in Northern Ireland. The route commences in Bangor, passing through Newtownards, Comber, Ballygowan, Saintfield, and finishes on the northern outskirts of Ballynahinch.

There are two dual carriageway sections; between Bangor and Newtownards, and between Newtownards and Comber. The second of these passes through farmland near the northern shores of Strangford Lough. This section also passes within 2 miles of Scrabo Tower.
