= Comber (civil parish) =

Parish in County Down, Northern Ireland

- civil parish

Irish transcription(s)
  - Derivation: An Comar
  - Meaning: the confluence
- Sovereign state: United Kingdom
- Country: Northern Ireland
- County: Down
- Barony: Castlereagh Lower, Castlereagh Upper
- Settlements / Townlands: Ballygowan, Moneyreagh, Cherryvalley, Comber; townlands : 43

Comber (from Irish An Comar, meaning 'the confluence') is a civil parish in County Down, Northern Ireland. It is mainly situated in the historic barony of Castlereagh Lower, with a small portion in the barony of Castlereagh Upper.

== Settlements ==
Settlements within Comber civil parish include:

- Ballygowan (partly in civil parish of Killinchy)
- Comber
- Moneyreagh
- Cherryvalley

== Townlands ==
Comber civil parish contains the following 43 townlands: (Most of the 43 townlands are in the barony of Castlereagh Lower, but 2 townlands (Clontonakelly and Crossnacreevy) are in the barony of Castlereagh Upper.)

- Ballyalloly
- Ballyaltikilligan
- Ballyalton
- Ballybeen
- Ballycreelly
- Ballygowan
- Ballyhanwood
- Ballyhenry Major
- Ballyhenry Minor
- Ballykeel
- Ballyloughan
- Ballymagaughey
- Ballymaglaff
- Ballymalady
- Ballynichol
- Ballyrickard
- Ballyrush
- Ballyrussell
- Ballystockart
- Ballywilliam
- Carnasure
- Castleaverry
- Cattogs
- Cherryvalley
- Clontonakelly
- Crossnacreevy
- Cullintraw
- Drumhirk
- Edenslate
- Glassmoss
- Gransha
- Killynether
- Lisleen
- Longlands
- Magherascouse
- Moneyreagh
- Monlough
- Mount Alexander
- Ringcreevy
- Rough Island
- Town Parks
- Trooperfield
- Tullygarvan
- Tullyhubbert

== See also ==
- List of civil parishes of County Down
