= Ringhaddy =

Townland on Strangford Lough, Northern Ireland

Coordinates: 54.4515°N 5.6333°W

Ringhaddy: Irish: Rinn an Chadaigh
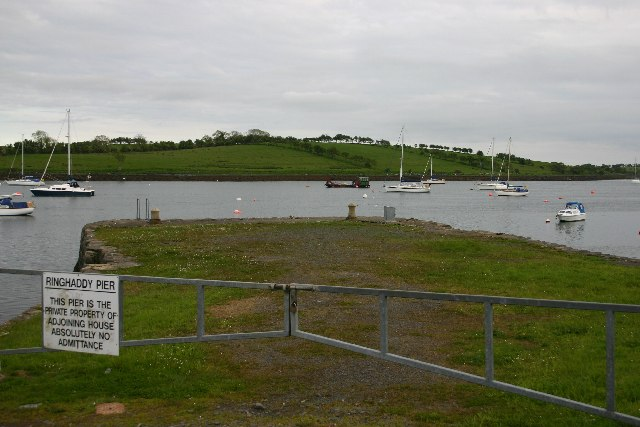
- Ringhaddy quay in 2005
- County: County Down
- Country: Northern Ireland
- Sovereign state: United Kingdom
- Postcode district: BT23
- Dialling code: 028

Ringhaddy (from Irish Rinn an Chadaigh 'point of the covenant') is a townland on the shores of Strangford Lough, County Down, Northern Ireland, 5 km south of Whiterock. It is in the civil parish of Killinchy and the historic barony of Dufferin.

== History ==
The name Ringhaddy was first seen as Ecclesia de Rencady, the church of Ringhaddy, in the Papal Taxation of 1306. In 1470 the castle was recorded captured by Henry O'Neill, then transferred to MacQuillen of Dufferin. A c.1580 map of County Down showed Renaghaddye, with 2 castles and a church, on a peninsula or island. The ruined church is on a drumlin north of the castle, which was built in the 15th century. The manor and castle of Ringhaddy and Killyleagh belonged to the Whites of Dufferin in 1605, the castle having been remodeled by Sir Ralph Lane in 1601-2. As well as the castle and church (both scheduled historic monuments) there is a quay.

== Places of interest ==
It is the home of Ringhaddy Daffodils, which breeds and grows prize winning daffodils, and Ringhaddy Cruising Club, a yacht club founded in 1975.

The area has become very popular for diving, with the wreck of the MY Alastor some 80m offshore from Ringhaddy Quay at a depth of 23m. This 143 ft luxury motor yacht was built in 1927 and destroyed by fire on 11 March 1946 while moored up for painting.

== See also ==
- List of townlands in County Down
- Ringhand
