= West Coast Video =

US video rental company

West Coast Entertainment Corp.
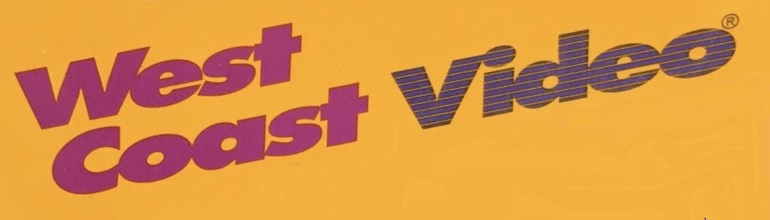
- Trade name: West Coast Video
- Type: Public
- Traded as: Nasdaq: WCEC
- Industry: Retail
- Founded: 1983; 43 years ago
- Defunct: 2009; 17 years ago
- Fate: Liquidation
- Headquarters: Langhorne, Pennsylvania, United States
- Area served: United States, Canada, Peru
- Products: Retailing and renting of DVDs and video games
- Parent: Medical Products Laboratories
- Website: WestCoastVideo.com (Archive)

West Coast Entertainment Corp., doing business as West Coast Video, was an American video rental store chain based in Langhorne, Pennsylvania. Established in 1983, the company liquidated in 2009, but some stores continued to use the West Coast Video name and run independently. As of 2024, there are currently no West Coast Video stores open in North America.

== History ==
=== 1980s: inception, acquisitions and expansion ===
In 1983, Elliot Stone opened the first West Coast Video store in Northeast Philadelphia. During the next three months, Stone established the chain by launching three more stores.

West Coast Video acquired all 455 National Video stores in September 1988. The chain now had 660 stores in total, making it the world's largest video rental chain at that time.

=== 1990s: bankruptcy, restructuring, online presence, and lawsuit ===
West Coast Video had a revenue of $250 million in 1990. The chain opened its first Canadian store in 1991 (although there were already two franchise stores in Burnaby and Whiterock, BC). It was located in the Orleans neighborhood of Ottawa, Ontario. However, West Coast faced financial difficulties due to increased competition in the video rental industry. The company reported a $120 million revenue in 1991, less than half of what it made the previous year. The company filed for Chapter 11 bankruptcy in March 1992 and had a positive cash flow six months later.

In 1993, the West Coast Video company changed its name to West Coast Entertainment Corporation. It eventually created additional brands. During that same year, a second store in Canada was opened in Ottawa South (now Old Ottawa South) neighborhood of Ottawa. The GamePower Headquarters video game stores franchise was launched in 1994.

Online websites for West Coast Video were launched in May 1999. This included an online shopping store that sold movies.

In March 1999, West Coast Video was sued for using the "MovieBuff" trademark on its website's HTML metatags.

=== 2000s–present: New formats, chain demise, and independence of remaining stores ===
Both Blu-ray and HD DVD movies were offered at West Coast Video in the mid to late 2000s due to the high definition optical disc format war happening at the time. Games for the three most popular seventh generation consoles (the PlayStation 3, Wii and Xbox 360) were also added to the stores' inventory. Both of these major additions to inventory placed a financial burden on the chain. In January 2007, the West Coast Video chain was down to only 20 locations in the United States. Five of these would close before the end of the year, another three prior to May 2008, and yet another three by the end of 2008. The chain finished in 2008, with only nine locations in the United States. In 2009, the chain ceased to exist and although remaining stores could keep the West Coast Video brand name, they were now independent video rental stores.

== Legacy ==
As one of the earliest brand names for a video rental chain, some West Coast Video customers have become attached to their independently owned local store. This is especially true of the Ottawa South location, which was described as "a legend" and a "stalwart in the neighbourhood for decades". The arson crime which destroyed the building devastated loyal clients.

Before the last store closed in the 2010s the last few West Coast locations that remained tended to remain innovative in the way that they ran their business. Some featured a hobby store and a pizzeria inside or adjacent to the building

Currently West Coast Video is only active in Peru. It operates solely as a DVD-by-mail company. With no physical store fronts.

== Internationalization ==
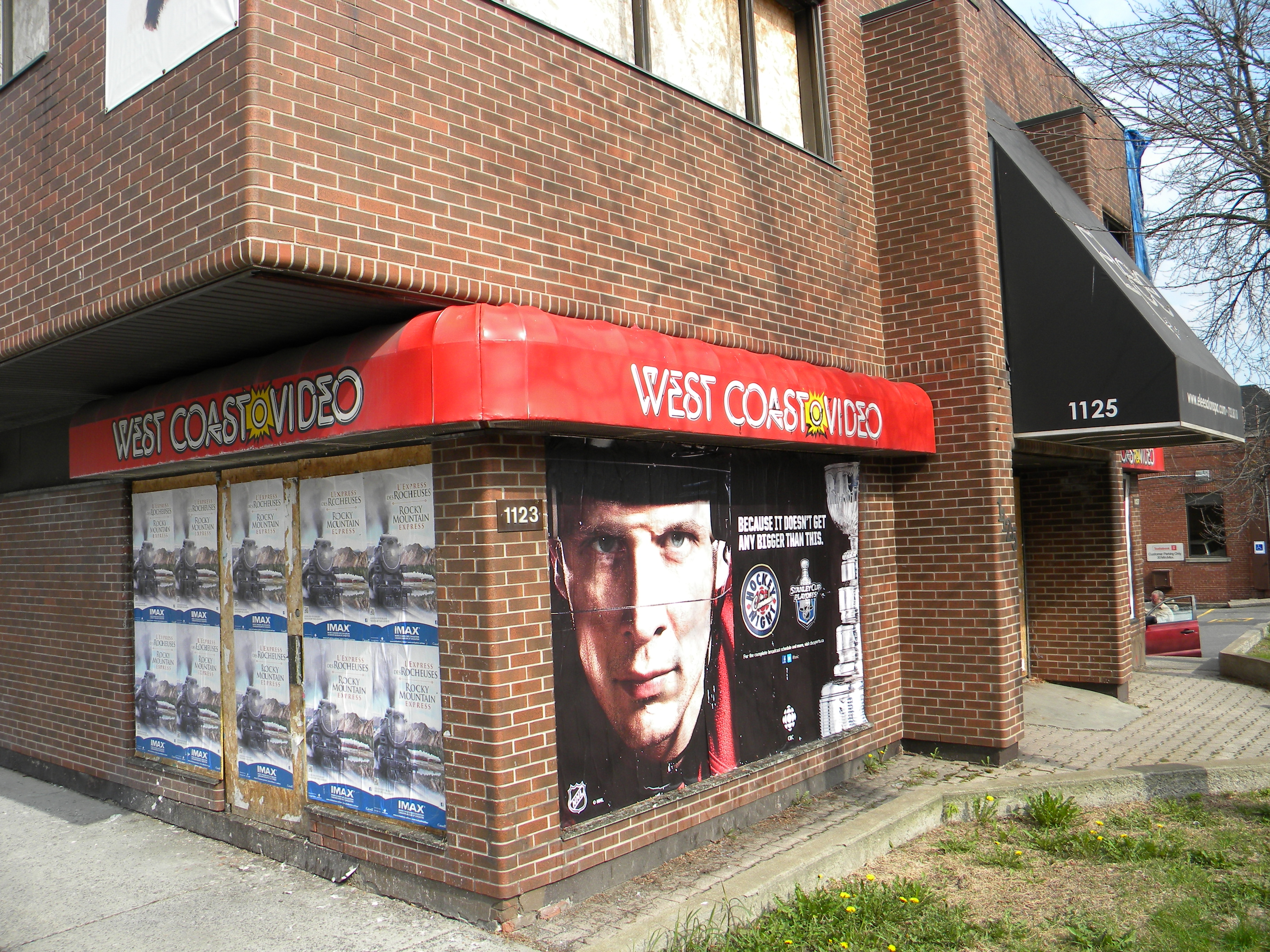
A West Coast Video store in Ottawa. It was forced to close due to arson in 2009, and was later demolished in 2021.

The West Coast Video chain expanded beyond its northeast and mid-west United States locations. Rental stores were previously found in Canada and Curaçao, and the brand remains present in Peru.

=== Canada ===
Two West Coast Video stores were located in Ottawa and closed by the end of the 2000s. There was also a West Coast Video store located in Mississauga, which was bought out by Blockbuster in the mid-1990s. Two other stores were located BC's Lower Mainland- one in Burnaby, opened in 1988, and Whiterock. The Burnaby store changed ownership and was re-branded Videophiles in the early 1990s. Both stores were closed by the early 2000s.

The iconic Ottawa South location near The Glebe neighborhood was launched in 1993. It eventually offered free delivery with a minimum order. A fire burned the building on 5 February 2009, and although the store was declared "temporarily closed" in 2010, the store, and its building would never reopen, and were demolished in 2021.

Another lesser-known location in the Orleans, Ontario region opened its doors in 1991 near the Fortune and Orleans intersection. The owner held monthly drawing contests and was known for decorating festively throughout the year. This location was well known for holding less popular titles and games, and for having a pornography section tucked away in the back of the store. Competitors included two Rogers Plus stores and one Jumbo Video store, all which were located near Orleans Road. This increased competition prompted West Coast Video to lower its rates, until it was eventually forced to close by the late 2000s. The owner renovated the empty building to create a "Fortune Professional Centre", dividing the video store's large space into two smaller spaces for two tenants. The space was available for lease on July 1, 2010, during Canada Day. Since October 4, 2010, the Convent Glen Dental Centre occupied one of the two spaces.

=== Peru ===
In Peru, West Coast Video offers a DVD-by-mail service nationwide.
