= Ballymartin =

Ballymartin (from Irish Baile Mhic Giolla Mhártain 'Gilmartin's townland') is one of several places on the island of Ireland.

Northern Ireland

- A place near Templepatrick and junction 5 of the M2 motorway in County Antrim
- A small village and townland between Annalong and Kilkeel in the Newry, Mourne and Down District Council area in County Down
- A place in Tullynakill parish, County Down

Republic of Ireland

- A townland in Borris parish, County Carlow
- A small area off the village of Pallaskenry, County Limerick
- A village in Kilmaine parish, on the N84 between Kilmaine and Ballinrobe, in County Mayo

== See also ==
- List of towns and villages in Northern Ireland
- List of towns and villages in the Republic of Ireland
