= Ringhand =

Ringhand is a surname. Notable people with the surname include:

- Janis Ringhand (born 1950), American politician
- Lori Ringhand, American legal scholar

== See also ==
- Ringhaddy
- Ringland (disambiguation)
