= Comber Whiskey =

Irish whiskey

Coordinates: 54°32′56″N 5°44′41″W

Label of an "Old Comber" bottle.

Comber Whiskey was an Irish whiskey distilled in Comber, County Down, Northern Ireland. It was last distilled in 1956. However, some reserves were discovered and bottled in the 1980s as "Old Comber" and some of these bottles occasionally come up for sale.

Comber Distilleries was established in 1825. At the time of its closure, it was the last pot still in Northern Ireland; the pot stills have ended up the Cooley Distillery. The Comber Tandoori Indian restaurant on Killinchy Street in the town occupies the last remaining Comber Distilleries building.

In 2021, Echlinville Distillery who took over the brand, released an Old Comber bottling of Pot Still whiskey matured in Bourbon, Sherry and Ruby port casks.
