= Balloo, County Down =

Village in County Down, Northern Ireland

Balloo: Irish: Baile Aodha
- Location within County Down
- Population: 189 (2011 census)
  - Belfast: 13 miles
  - Dublin: 81 miles
- District: Ards and North Down
- County: County Down
- Country: Northern Ireland
- Sovereign state: United Kingdom
- Post town: NEWTOWNARDS
- Postcode district: BT23
- Dialling code: 028
- Police: Northern Ireland
- Fire: Northern Ireland
- Ambulance: Northern Ireland
- UK Parliament: Strangford
- NI Assembly: Strangford

Balloo (from Irish Baile Aodha, meaning 'Hugh's townland') is the name of a small village and of a townland near Killinchy in County Down, Northern Ireland. It is 5 miles south of Comber on the A22 road between Belfast and Downpatrick. It is situated in the townland of the same name, the civil parish of Killinchy and the historic barony of Dufferin. It lies within the Ards and North Down Borough. It had a population of 189 people (in 83 households) as of the 2011 census, an increase from 159 people in the 2001 census.

== Places of interest ==
Originally a coaching house dating back to the late 17th century, Balloo House is a pub and restaurant, with stone floors and an Aga dominating the kitchen bar. It was once a large farmhouse, bought by the McConnell family in 1893, and has been a licensed premises ever since. In January 2008, Balloo House was announced as one of the Bridgestone Guide's top 100 restaurants in Ireland.

== People ==
- John Jordan (1852–1925), a British diplomat, was born in Upper Balloo.

== See also ==
- List of towns and villages in Northern Ireland
- List of townlands in County Down
