= A22 road (Northern Ireland) =

Road in Northern Ireland

Coordinates: 54.5088°N 5.7152°W

A22

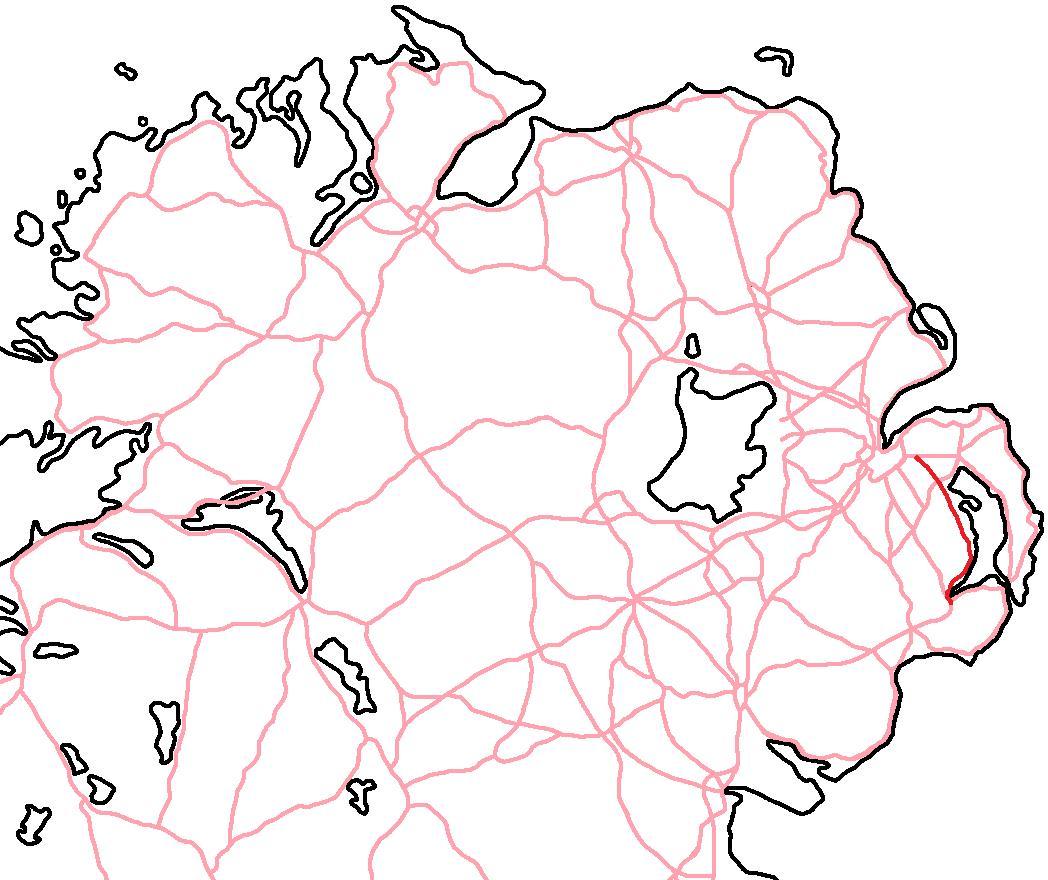
- The route of the A22 in red from Dundonald (County Down) to Downpatrick (County Down).

Route information
- Length: 21.3 mi (34.3 km)

Location
- Country: United Kingdom
- Constituent country: Northern Ireland
- Primary destinations: Dundonald; Comber; Lisbane; Balloo; Killyleagh; Downpatrick

Road network
- Roads in Northern Ireland; Motorways; A roads in Northern Ireland

The A22 is a road in County Down, in Northern Ireland. Its route starts in Dundonald and runs to Comber, forming the main transport corridor connecting Belfast and Comber, a commuter town situated 8 miles outside of the city. After bypassing Comber town itself, the route continues along the eastern shores of, though not directly adjacent to, Strangford Lough. The route passes through Lisbane, Balloo (near Killinchy), and Killyleagh, terminating in Downpatrick.
