= Roy Spence (filmmaker) =

Northern Irish twin filmmakers

- Born: 25 December 1944 (age 80); Comber, County Down, Northern Ireland
- Occupation: Film director

Roy Spence (born 25 December 1944) is a Northern Irish film director known for directing low-budget films belonging to the horror, fantasy and science fiction genres, such as The Testament of Caleb Meeke (1969), The Beast of Druids' Hill (1971), and Brady's Bargain (1983). Spence also directed the drama film The Wishing Stone (1978).

Spence was born alongside his twin brother Noel Spence, who would help Roy distribute his films. The brothers opened their own two cinemas, the Tudor Cinema and the Excelsior, in their hometown of Comber, County Down, Northern Ireland.
