= Carrickmannon =

Townland in Northern Ireland

Coordinates: 54°28′48″N 5°46′33″W

Carrickmannon: Irish: Carraig Mhanainn
- Location within County Down
- County: County Down
- Country: Northern Ireland
- Sovereign state: United Kingdom
- Postcode district: BT
- Dialling code: 028

Carrickmannon (from Irish Carraig Mhanainn 'Manannán’s rock') is a rural townland in County Down, Northern Ireland. It has an area of 1436.5 acres (5.81 km^{2}). It is situated in the civil parish of Killinchy and the historic barony of Castlereagh Upper, located just south of the village, Ballygowan. It lies within the Ards and North Down Borough Council.

== Education ==
Carrickmannon has one primary school. Carrickmannon Primary School is a controlled Primary school, situated 1.5 miles outside the village of Ballygowan. The current enrolment is 101 children. The school opened in 1825, is a listed building of historical interest, and has been renovated and extended.

== See also ==
- List of townlands in County Down
