= John Jordan (diplomat) =

British diplomat (1852–1925)

The Right Honourable Sir John Jordan GCMG GCIE KCB

Envoy Extraordinary and Minister Plenipotentiary from the United Kingdom to the Qing Empire
- In office 19 September 1906 – 12 March 1910
- Monarch: Edward VII
- Preceded by: R.G. Townley
- Succeeded by: William Grenfell Max-Muller

Envoy Extraordinary and Minister Plenipotentiary from the United Kingdom to the Republic of China
- In office 28 November 1910 – 1 March 1920
- Monarch: George V
- Preceded by: William Grenfell Max-Muller
- Succeeded by: Sir Beilby Alston

Personal details
- Born: John Newell Jordan; 5 September 1852 Balloo, County Down, Ireland
- Died: 14 September 1925 (aged 73)
- Education: Royal Belfast Academical Institution; Queen's College, Belfast; Queen's College, Cork

Sir John Newell Jordan GCMG GCIE KCB PC (5 September 1852 – 14 September 1925) was a British diplomat.

== Early life and career ==
Jordan was born in Balloo, County Down, Ireland, the son of John Jordan, a wealthy Presbyterian farmer, and his wife Mary (née Newell). He apparently never lost his Ulster accent. He was educated at the Royal Belfast Academical Institution, Queen's College, Belfast and Queen's College, Cork. At the age of 21, Jordan wrote to the Foreign office to consider his recruitment as he desired to be stationed at Japan as a diplomat for unknown reason. In 1876 he joined the Chinese Consular Service as a student interpreter. He held various posts in South China before being appointed Chinese Secretary at the British Legation in Peking in 1891.

In 1896 he was appointed Consul-General at Seoul, Korea, becoming Chargé d'affaires in 1898 and Minister-Resident in August 1901. Jordan expressed the belief that Korea was incapable of self-governance, and advocated for its annexation by Japan. He remained there until November 1905, being appointed Knight Commander of the Order of St Michael and St George (KCMG) in 1904. Jordan received the Queen Victoria Jubilee Medal in 1897 followed by the King Edward VII Coronation Medal in 1902.

== Ambassadorial career ==
In 1906 he was appointed HM Envoy Extraordinary and Minister Plenipotentiary to China as the successor to Sir Ernest Satow and remained in the post until his retirement in 1920. He was appointed Knight Commander of the Order of the Bath (KCB) in the 1909 Birthday Honours and in 1910 received the Freedom of the City of Belfast at the same ceremony as the Scottish-American industrialist Andrew Carnegie.

In August 1914 while serving as the British minister-plenipotentiary to China, Jordan was approached by President Yuan Shikai with an offer to have China declare war on Germany and to send 50, 000 soldiers who together with a British force would evict German forces from the Shandong province, which Germany had special rights in since 1897. Qingdao, the capital of Shandong province was the chief German naval base in Asia and the home of the East Asia Squadron of the Imperial German Navy. Qingdao had been heavily fortified by the Germans and Yuan stated that China would need help in besieging the fortress-city. Jordan rejected Yuan's offer out of hand, saying that Britain did not need China's help to defeat Germany. In fact, most of the British Army had been sent to aid Belgium and France, which had been invaded by Germany and there were insufficient forces available in 1914 to besiege Qingdao. Jordan preferred enlisting the help of Japan, which Britain had signed an alliance with in 1902, to besiege Qingdao. Yuan was strongly opposed to having the Japanese besiege Qingdao as he predicted (correctly) that the Japanese would want to take over all the German special rights in Shandong for themselves. The "Shandong Question" proved to be one of the most difficult problems at the Paris peace conference in 1919. Both Bertram Lenox Simpson, the Beijing correspondent of The Daily Telegraph and George Morrison, the former Beijing correspondent of The Times were aware of Yuan's offer and Jordan's rejection. Both Simpson and Morrison felt that Jordan had made a major error in choosing Japan over China as that led directly to the "Shangdog Question" which could had been avoided if Jordan had accepted Yuan's offer.

Jordan was appointed Knight Grand Commander of the Order of the Indian Empire (GCIE) in 1911, and Knight Grand Cross of the Order of St Michael and St George (GCMG) in the 1920 Birthday Honours shortly after his retirement. He was also appointed to the Privy Council in 1915, entitling him to the style "The Right Honourable". In 1920, Jordan became a director of the Chartered Bank of India, Australia and China.

Jordan, despite his retirement, was a delegate to the Washington Naval Conference of 1921–1922.

== Personal life and family ==
In 1885, Jordan married Annie Howe Cromie (1849–1939), the eldest child of Dr Robert Cromie JP (1813–1901), the ruling elder of Clough Presbyterian church, a general practitioner and the local registrar of births and deaths, and his wife Ann Jane (née Henry; 1823–1899) of Ballyhosset, near Ardglass.

They had four children: three sons and a daughter. Dr John Herbert Jordan MC (1887–1949) was head of the Department of Public Health in Shanghai. Edith Mary Jordan (1890–1918) was married in 1911 to Lieutenant-General Sir Travers Clarke (1871–1962) and died in the flu pandemic seven years later. Robert Cromie "Bob" Jordan (1891–1966) worked as a young man in the Hong Kong and Shanghai Bank in Shanghai, before contracting polio.

Sir John and Lady Jordan were keen Sinophiles and collectors. Part of their extensive collection of ornate oriental carvings, jade, silver, ivories, textiles, porcelain, paintings and teapots was bequeathed to Bangor Borough Council by their son Bob and now form part of the collections of the North Down Museum.

== Legacy ==
At his death he left estate valued at £39,409.

Jordan Road in Hong Kong's Kowloon District is named after him.

== Notes ==
1. Approximately £3,032,000.00 at 2024 values.

== Books ==
- Xu, Guoqi (2005). China and the Great War China's Pursuit of a New National Identity and Internationalization. Cambridge: Cambridge University Press. ISBN 9780521842129.
