= A22 =

A22 or A-22 is a three-character acronym that may refer to:

== Vehicles ==
- A 22 (keelboat), a sailing yacht
- A-22 Maryland, an American light bomber of World War II manufactured by Glenn L. Martin Company
- Aero A.22, a Czech civil utility aircraft built during the 1920s
- Aeroprakt A-22, a Ukrainian ultralight aircraft
- Arrows A22, a Formula One car
- Fiat A.22, a piston aero-engine used on the 1925 Italian aircraft Ansaldo A.120
- IVL A.22 Hansa, a 1922 Finnish license copy of the German two-seat, low winged single-engined seaplane Hansa-Brandenburg W.33
- MAN A22, internal code for the NLxx3F low-floor single-deck bus chassis built by MAN

== Biomedicine ==
- British NVC community A22 (Littorella uniflora - Lobelia dortmanna community), a plant community
- Anthrax (ICD-10 code A22)
- A22 (antibiotic) (S-[3,4-dichlorobenzyl] isothiourea hydrochloride)

== Others ==
- A22 Sports Management, company aiming to create a European Super League in association football
- List of A22 roads
- English Opening, Encyclopaedia of Chess Openings code
- Samsung Galaxy A22, a mid-range Android-based smartphone manufactured by Samsung
