= Tullynakill =

Tullynakill: Irish: Tulaigh na Cille
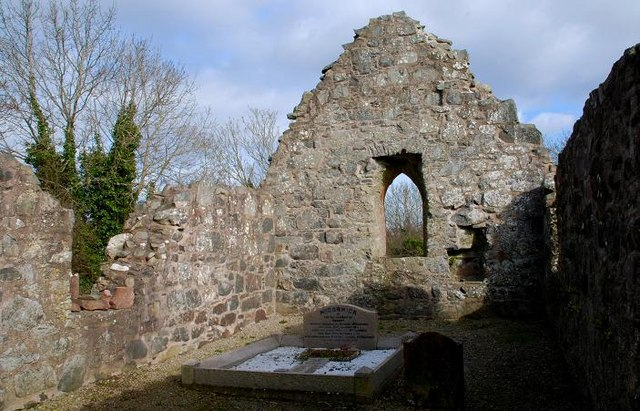
- Tullynakill old church in 2008
- County: County Down
- Country: Northern Ireland
- Sovereign state: United Kingdom
- Postcode district: BT23
- Dialling code: 028

Tullynakill (from Irish Tulaigh na Cille, meaning 'knoll of the church') is a civil parish and townland (of 317 acres) in County Down, Northern Ireland. It is situated in the historic barony of Castlereagh Lower.

== History ==
The name Tullynakill appears in the 1615 Terrier of church property and on the Raven maps of c.1625. An inquisition on the bishop's land was taken at Tullomkill in 1617, and in 1659 Tollenekill was the parish and Tolinkill the townland.

Antiquarian William Reeves noted in the mid-19th century the ruins of a 17th-century church next to the one then in use in Tullynakill townland. There was a church on this site in the 9th century and the ruined old church is dated 1639. A new church was built in 1826, but is now closed.

In 1836 it had a population of 1,386 people.

== Settlements ==
The civil parish contains the village of Ardmillan.

== Townlands ==
The civil parish contains the following townlands:

- Ballydrain
- Ballyglighorn
- Ballymartin
- Big Gull Rock
- Bird Island
- Castle Espie
- Cross Island
- Duck Rock
- Gull Rock
- Horse Island
- Lisbane
- Long Island
- Mahee Island
- Reagh Island
- Ringneill
- Rolly Island
- Tullynakill
- Watson's Island
- Wood Island

== See also ==
- List of civil parishes of County Down
