= Whiterock, County Down =

Village in County Down, Northern Ireland

Coordinates: 54°28′52″N 5°39′00″W

Whiterock: Irish: An Carraig Bhán
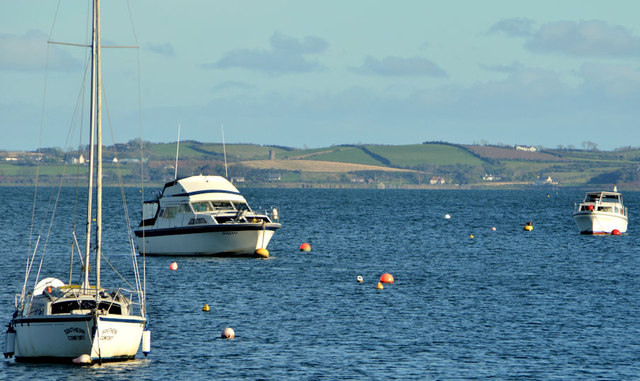
- Moorings, Whiterock, Strangford Lough

- Location within Northern Ireland Location within County Down Whiterock (County Down)
- Population: 351 (2001 Census)
- Irish grid reference: J524602
- District: Ards and North Down
- County: County Down
- Country: Northern Ireland
- Sovereign state: United Kingdom
- Post town: Newtownards
- Postcode district: BT23
- Dialling code: 028
- UK Parliament: Strangford
- NI Assembly: Strangford

Whiterock is a small village in County Down, Northern Ireland. It is within the townland of Killinakin, in the civil parish of Killinchy and historic barony of Dufferin, on the western shore of Strangford Lough, near to the village of Killinchy. It is in the Ards and North Down Borough. It had a population of 355 people (141 households) in the 2011 Census. (2001 Census: 351 people)

Whiterock is home to two yacht clubs: Strangford Lough Yacht Club and 1.5 km to the north, Down Cruising Club. The latter is based in a moored former lightship, the Petrel, acquired in 1968. The lightship had been built by the Dublin Dockyard Company in 1915 for the Commissioners of Irish Lights and since registered as a National Historic Ship UK.

Between the two yacht clubs is Sketrick Castle, a 15th-century tower house on Sketrick Island, now in ruins. To the south of Whiterock is Ballymorran Bay.

== History ==
The origin of the name "Whiterock" is uncertain, but it may come from a white aplite seam found in the local granite.

Rev. John Livingstone, chaplain to the Countess of Wigtown, was invited to Killinchy by Sir James Hamilton in 1630 and led a congregation at the earlier church on the site of the current parish church. In 1636, he attempted to sail to America on the Eagle Wing but returned and later moved to Stranraer, where his Killinchy congregation visited him from Donaghadee. Michael Bruce, a later minister, was arrested in Scotland for preaching illegally and chose exile in Killinchy, effectively returning home. The church cemetery contains the graves of Bruce's children and 1798 rebellion figures James McCann and Dr. James Cord. Killinchy Presbyterian Church has a cruciform layout, and nearby Sketrick Castle dates to the 1400s.

The area's history is featured in James Meikle’s 1839 novel Killinchy in the Days of Livingstone and W.G. Lyttle’s 1890 book Daft Eddie and the Smugglers of Strangford Lough, which inspired a local restaurant’s name.

=== Lightship Petrel ===
The lightship Petrel, built in 1915, was part of the Seabird-class of lightships and was constructed using riveted iron and steel. Petrel operated primarily at the Blackwater Bank station off the coast of Wexford, where it served as a floating lighthouse. After being decommissioned in 1968, the vessel was sold to Hammond Lane Foundries in Dublin. The Down Cruising Club later purchased the ship for £2,049.50 and moved it to Ballydorn in Strangford Lough. Since then, it has been used as the club's headquarters. Modifications have been made to support its new function, including the installation of electricity, heating, and communication systems. Petrel remains afloat at this location.

== Archeology ==
=== Whiterock Road, Killinchy ===
Excavations at Whiterock Road, Killinchy, revealed continuous human activity from the Late Mesolithic to the early medieval period. Finds included Mesolithic and Neolithic flint tools, Bronze Age burnt mound remains, Iron Age pits, and a prominent early medieval enclosure. The enclosure, approximately 42 metres in diameter, featured a ditch with evidence of metalworking and domestic activity. Radiocarbon dating places its construction in the 6th–7th centuries AD. Within the enclosure were structural remains, including a rectangular building and curvilinear gullies, with associated finds such as animal bones, iron slag, and Souterrain Ware pottery. A bronze enamelled buckle fragment, dated to the 7th–8th centuries, suggests high-status occupation. The site’s function remains uncertain, possibly ecclesiastical, military, or secular.

=== Sketrick Castle ===
Sketrick Castle is situated on Sketrick Island, accessible by a causeway on the west coast of Strangford Lough. Built in the mid-15th century, this large tower house was originally four storeys high. It featured a boat bay, a subterranean passage and four ground-level chambers. The largest chamber had a vaulted ceiling supported by wicker centring and contained two ovens, while a small, unlit room may have served as a lock-up or treasury. The structure remained mostly intact until half of it collapsed during a storm in 1896. Remnants of the bawn wall still stand to the north and east of the castle.

== Gallery ==
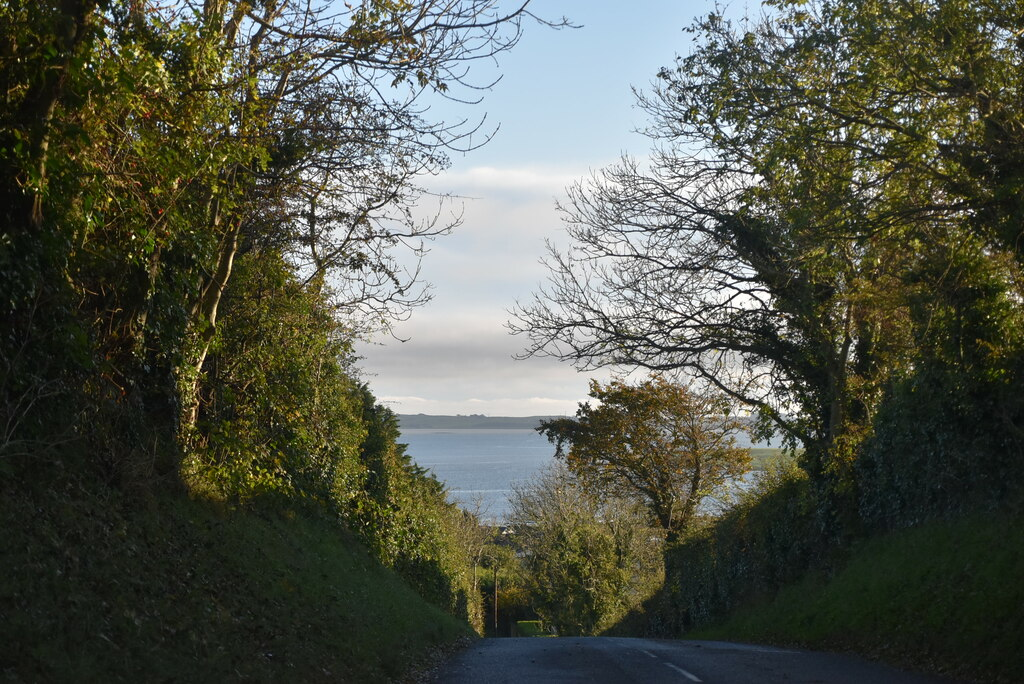
Whiterock Rd

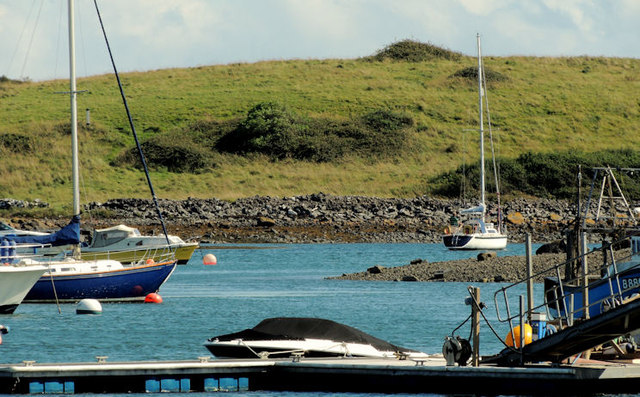
Yachts moored of Whiterock

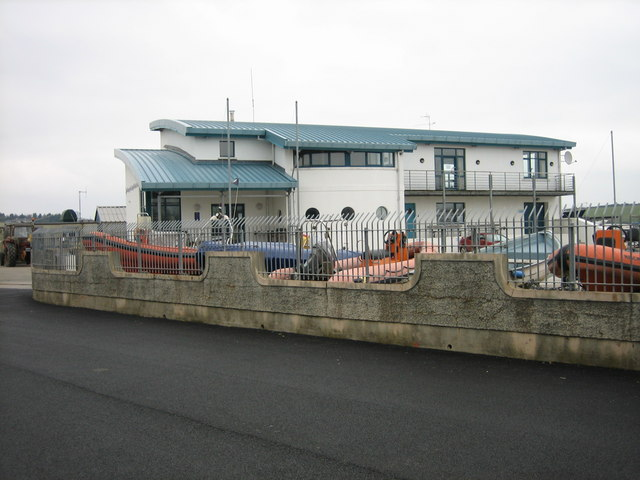
The Clubhouse of
Strangford Lough Yacht Club

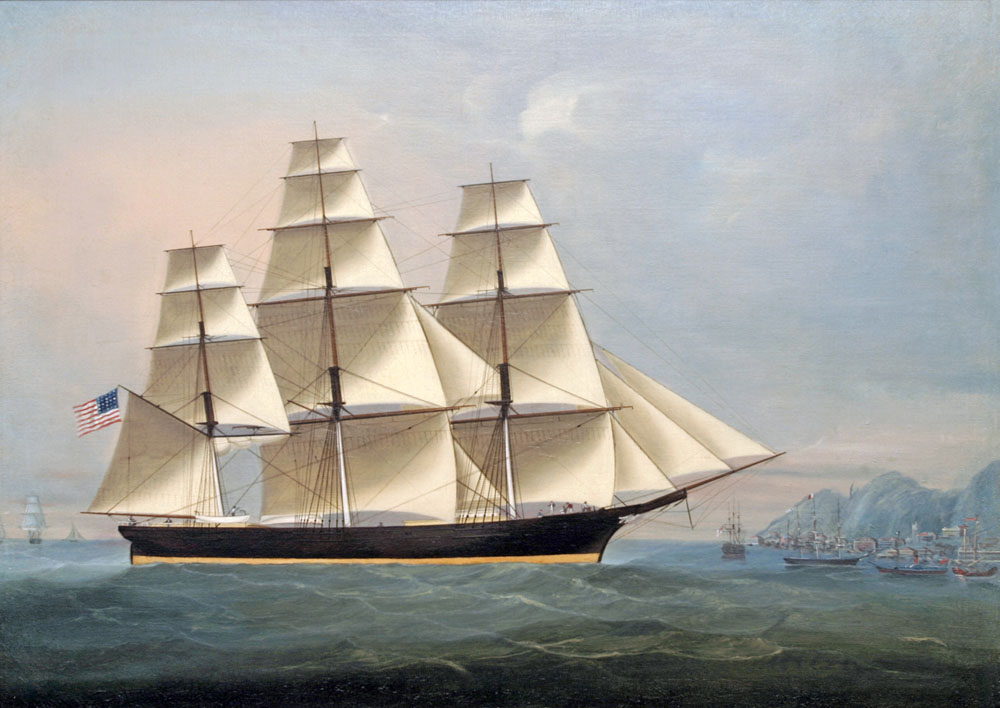
Clipper Eagle Wing off Hong Kong, c1860

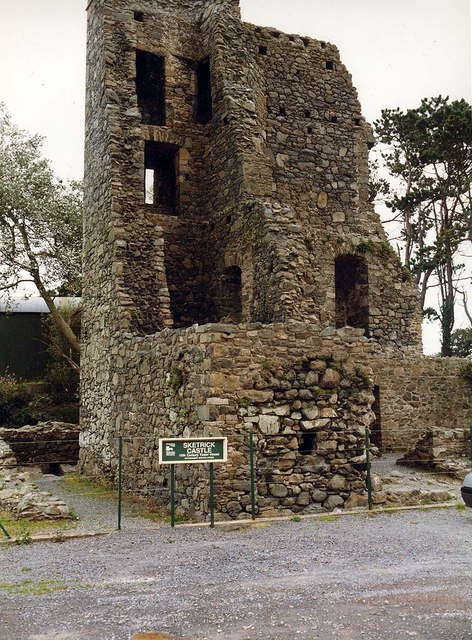
Sketrick Castle
