= Ballykeel =

Coordinates: 54°51′33″N 6°16′01″W

- Location within Northern Ireland
- County: County Antrim
- Country: Northern Ireland
- Sovereign state: United Kingdom
- Police: Northern Ireland
- Fire: Northern Ireland
- Ambulance: Northern Ireland

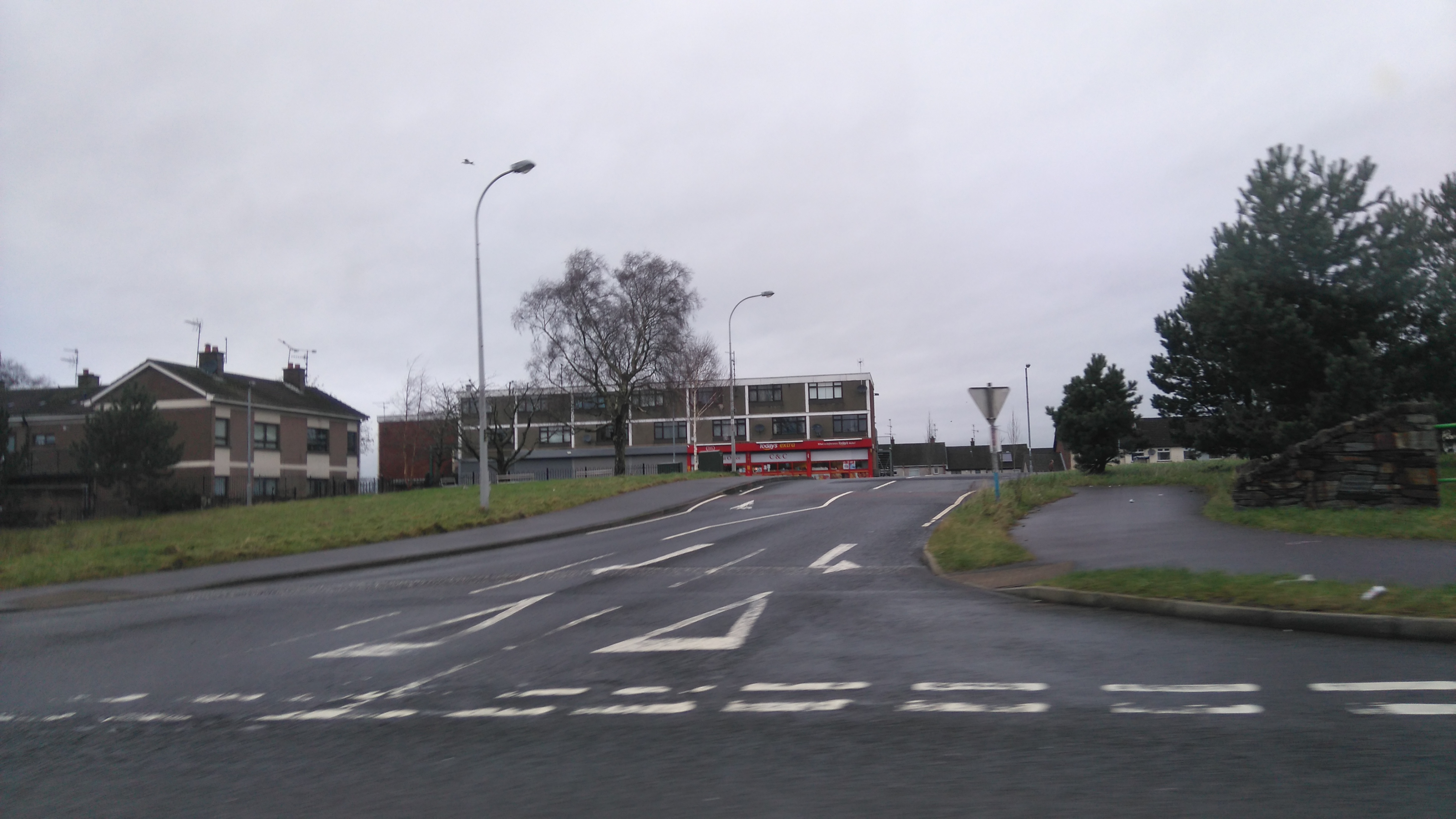
Entrance to Ballykeel 1, Ballymena.

Ballykeel (from Irish An Baile Caol, meaning "the narrow townland/farmstead") is a townland, containing a large housing estate off the Crebilly Road in South-East Ballymena, County Antrim, in Northern Ireland.

== History ==
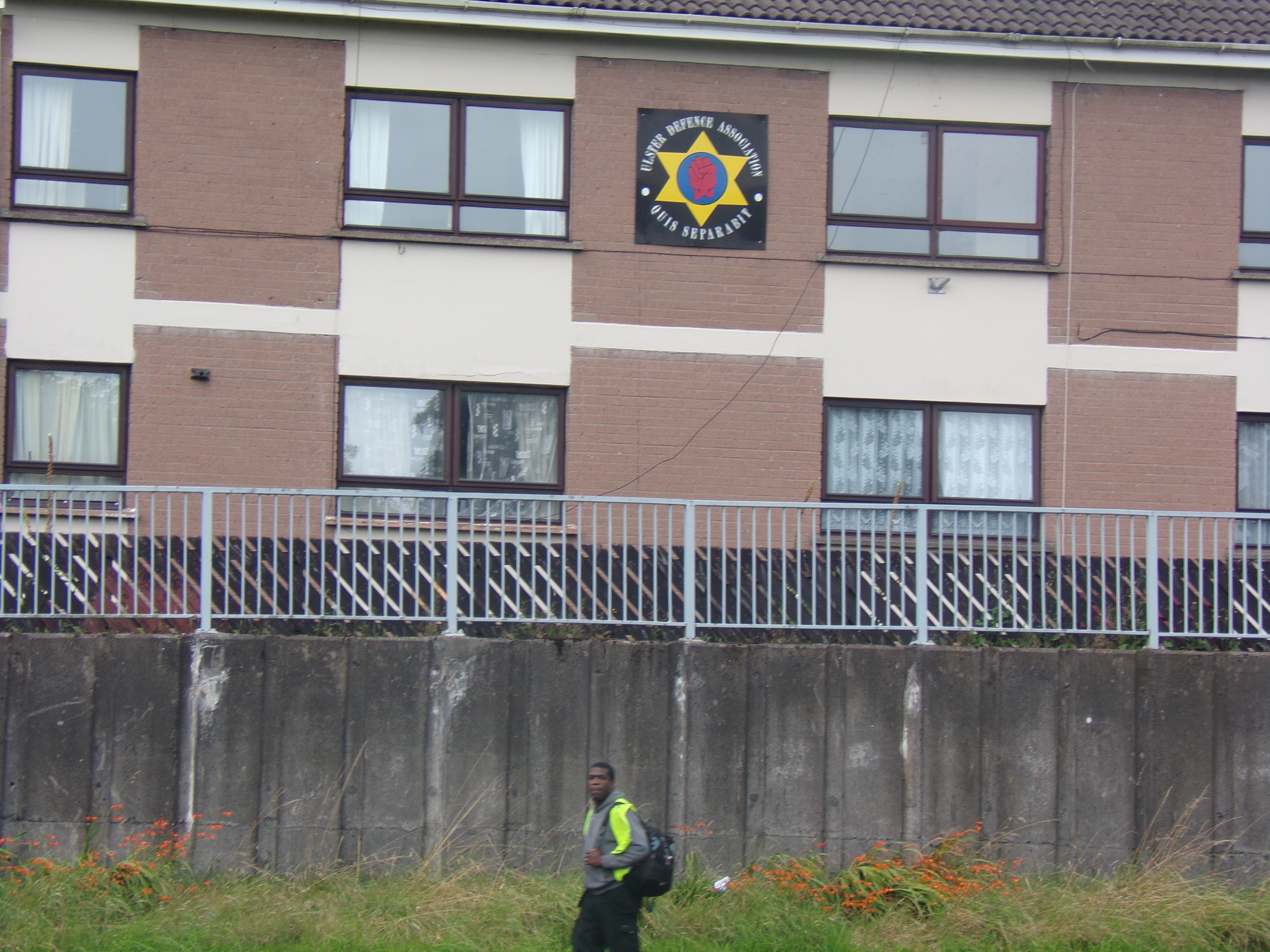
A UDA sign on the front of 2-storey flats in Ballykeel 1

The Ballykeel estate is divided into two separate estates, with the estate on the Western side known as "Ballykeel 1", built in 1962 to relieve overcrowding in Ballymena, and also to facilitate people coming into the town from the country to work in the factories in Ballymena. "Ballykeel 2" on the Eastern side, was built in 1972, due to further demand for housing. Ballykeel 1 comprises mainly rows of terraced houses parallel to the street, as well as 2 or 3 storey blocks of flats or maisonettes. Ballykeel 2 is built in the Radburn layout, with many of the terraced houses not facing the street, but onto a pedestrian path. Larger houses near the entrance of Ballykeel 2 show where the factory managers once lived and the terraces where the workers lived. There are also some 2-storey blocks of flats in Ballykeel 2. In 2001, both the Ballykeel 1 and 2 estates were 0-10% Catholic.

=== Decline and regeneration ===
Due to the closure of many mills and factories, many workers were left unemployed, and by the 1990s, many homes were empty and boarded up. In 2002 The Housing Executive demolished many houses in Ballykeel 2, leaving large green spaces behind. A derelict block of flats was turned into a community centre. Even so, unemployment, drug abuse, and alcohol abuse are still problems on the estate.

== Amenities ==
Between the two estates area playing pitches and a park, Ballykeel Primary School, Ballykeel Youth Centre, a playgroup and a few retail premises. On the opposite side of the road is Ballykeel Presbyterian Church, with the other Church on the estate, Ballykeel Pentecostal Church, located inside Ballykeel 2. There are also some retail premises opposite Ballykeel 2, and some inside Ballykeel 1.

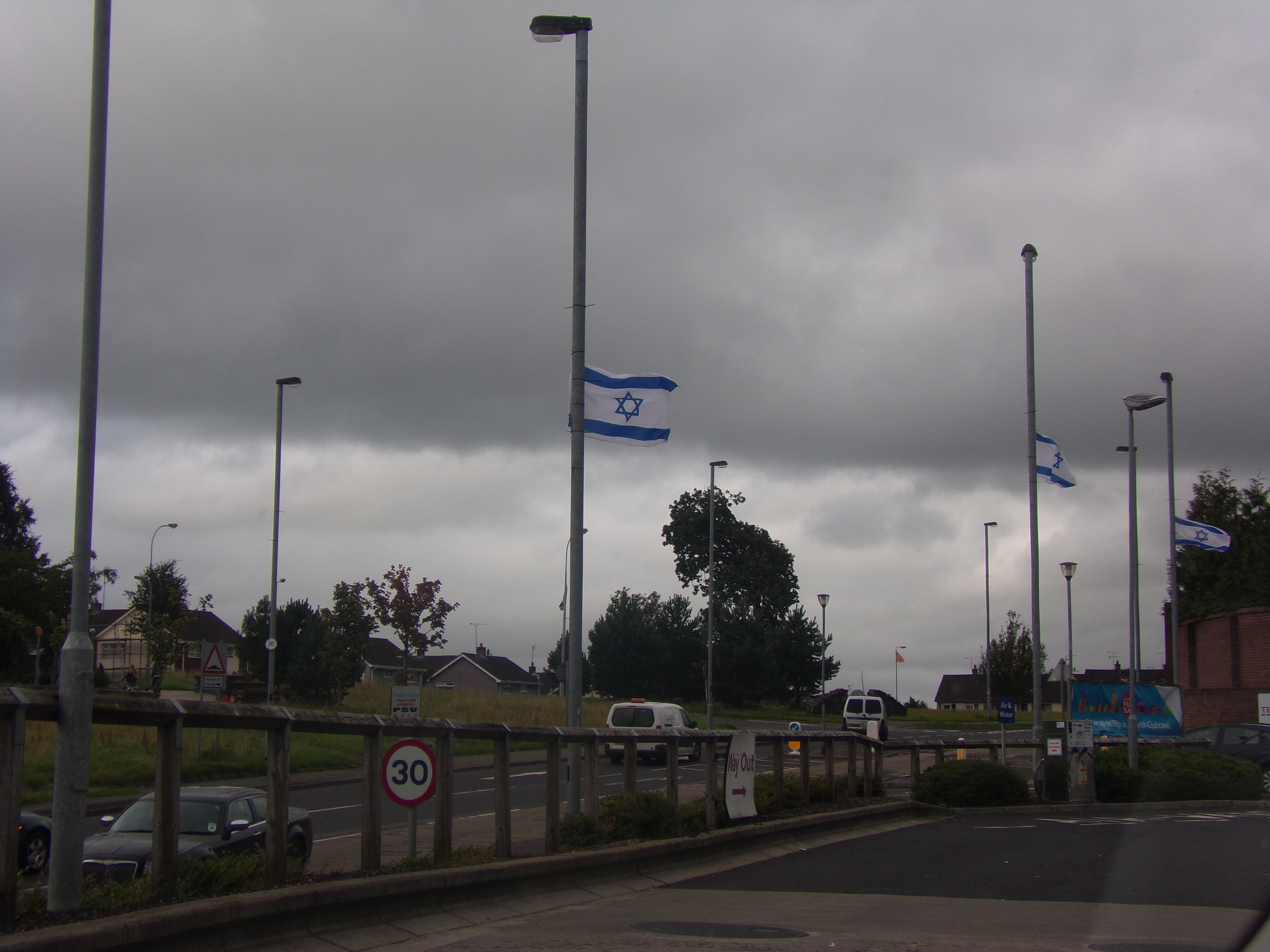
Israel flags outside Ballykeel 1

== Culture ==
Ballykeel has its own Marching band "Ballykeel Loyal Sons of Ulster" with blue and red attire for their uniform. Most people who live in Ballykeel are from a Protestant background. Every year on the night before the 12th of July, large bonfires are lit in Ballykeel 1 and Ballykeel 2 by loyalists. At this time of year, red, white and blue bunting, Union Flags, Ulster Banners and flags of the UDA/UFF and the UVF are flown from homes or on lampposts, as well as many other flags .
