= List of highways numbered 22A =

The following highways are numbered 22A:

== United States ==
- County Route 22A (Lee County, Alabama)
- Maryland Route 22A
- New York State Route 22A
  - County Route 22A (Allegany County, New York)
  - County Route 22A (Oswego County, New York)
  - County Route 22A (Ulster County, New York)
- Tennessee State Route 22A
- Vermont Route 22A
- Secondary State Highway 22A (Washington) (former)

== See also ==
- List of highways numbered 22
