= Ringland =

Ringland may refer to:

- Ringland, Newport, Wales
- Ringland, Norfolk, England
- Arthur Cuming Ringland (born 1882), Conservationist and co-founder of CARE
- Trevor Ringland (born 1959), solicitor and former Rugby Union winger for Northern Ireland
- Ringland (organisation), an environmental movement in Antwerp, Belgium
