= Sketrick Castle =

Castle in County Down, Northern Ireland

Coordinates: 54.4879°N 5.6485°W

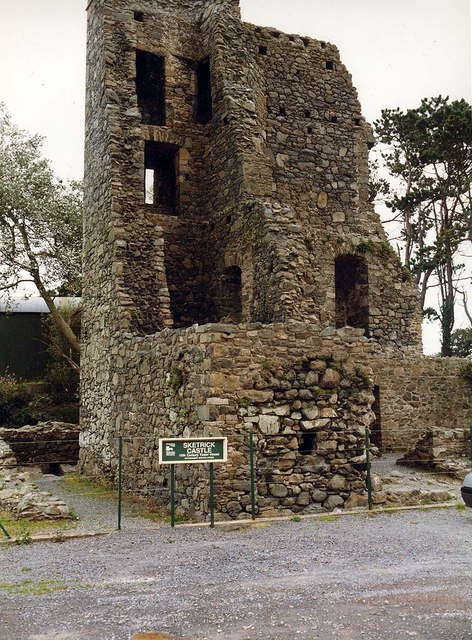
Sketrick Castle

Sketrick Castle is a castle situated on Sketrick Island near Whiterock, County Down, Northern Ireland. The castle is estimated to date back to the 12th century. Sketrick Castle tower-house and the passage to spring are State Care Historic Monuments in the townland of Sketrick Island, in the Ards and North Down Borough, located at grid reference: J5245 6252.

== History ==
The castle dates from the late 12th century. In the 14th century it was acquired by Sir Robert Savage. The Annals of the Four Masters record the capture of the castle in 1470 by an army led by the O'Neill to assist the MacQuillans. They took the castle and it was given to MacQuillan for safe keeping. It was intact until 1896 when a storm demolished much of it.

== Features ==
Sketrick Castle was originally 57 ft high, 51 ft long and 27 ft wide, four storeys high, with a boat bay and a stone subterranean passage which was discovered in 1957. The door in the east wall was defended by a murder-hole. There were four rooms on the ground floor, with two ovens in the largest. It has lintels running under the bawn wall to a chamber with a corbel over a fresh water spring. Parts of the bawn wall still survive to the north and east of the castle. The top floors are not intact, but the joist holes are partially visible still, and there would have been wooden floors on the upper levels. The castle previously guarded the causeway to the west of the island. The castle is free to visit.

== See also ==
- Castles in Northern Ireland
