= Ballygowan =

Village in County Down, Northern Ireland

Coordinates: 54.50252°N 5.79211°W

Ballygowan: Irish: Baile Mhic Gabhann
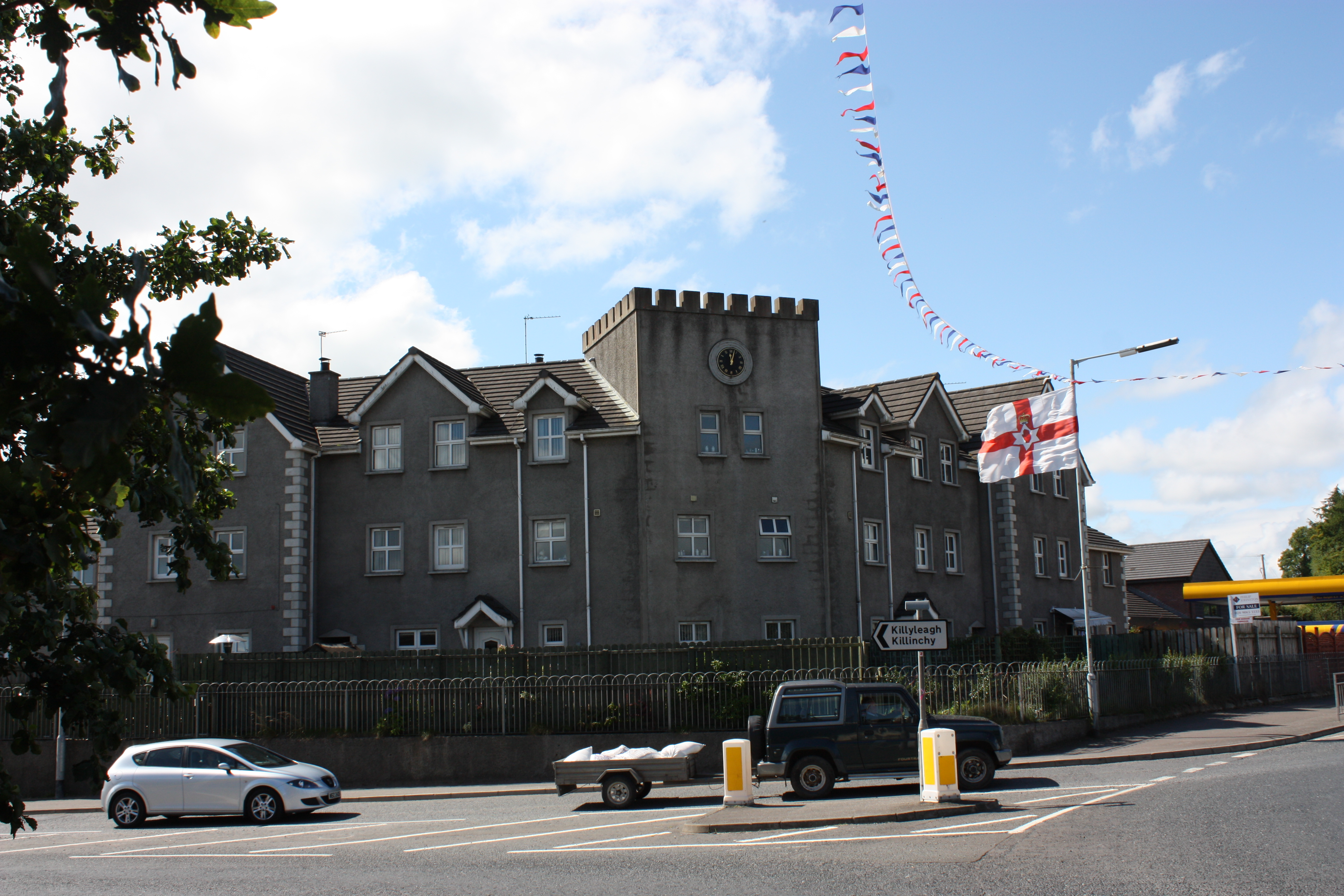

- Location within County Down
- Area: 0.38 sq mi (0.98 km^{2})
- Population: 3,138 (2021 census)
  - Density: 8,258/sq mi (3,188/km^{2})
- Irish grid reference: J4308063725
  - Belfast: 8.7 mi (14.0 km)
- District: Ards and North Down
- County: County Down
- Country: Northern Ireland
- Sovereign state: United Kingdom
- Post town: NEWTOWNARDS
- Postcode district: BT23
- Dialling code: 028
- Police: Northern Ireland
- Fire: Northern Ireland
- Ambulance: Northern Ireland
- UK Parliament: Strangford
- NI Assembly: Strangford
- Website: http://www.ballygowan.info

Ballygowan (from Irish Baile Mhic Gabhann, meaning 'McGowan's townland') is a village in County Down, Northern Ireland. It is within the Ards and North Down Borough. The town of Comber is a short distance to the north-east, the town of Saintfield to the south, and the city of Belfast further to the north-west. It is within the civil parishes of Killinchy and Comber and is split between the historic baronies of Castlereagh Lower and Castlereagh Upper. It had a population of 3,138 people in the 2021 census.

== History ==
Before the early 17th century Plantation of Ulster, when many Lowland Scots moved across the Irish Sea to settle in northern Ireland on lands granted by King James I to James Hamilton and Hugh Montgomery, the area of Ballygowan was sparsely inhabited by Irish Gaels. It was within the territory of Clannaboy, and in 1744 the McGowans of the Ards were associated with the Clannaboy O'Neills.

In the late 18th century the village comprised a bridge (over the River Blackwater at the intersection of the Comber/Saintfield and Killyleagh/Belfast roads), a dozen or so small houses and an inn. The surrounding townlands were populated by a great number of small tenant farmers and weavers. The main landlords were Lord Dufferin and Lord Londonderry.

From the mid-19th century through the early 20th century the population of the rural area surrounding Ballygowan declined considerably as many people emigrated to North America or found work in Comber, Saintfield and particularly in Belfast. However, it was during this period, and subsequent to the introduction of the Belfast & County Down Railway in 1850, that the village began to grow. Ballygowan railway station opened on 10 September 1858, but finally closed on 15 January 1950. After the railway closed in 1950 the village became an attractive "dormitory" town and the ensuing 50 years have seen rapid growth.

On Monday, 15 September 2014, the remains of The Baron Bannside (better known as The Rev. Ian Paisley) were buried in the graveyard attached to Ballygowan Free Presbyterian Church. Lord Bannside was a former First Minister of Northern Ireland and a former Leader of the DUP.

== Demography ==
=== 2001 census ===
In the 2001 census, Ballygowan had a population of 2,671 people.

=== 2011 census ===
On census day in 2011, 27 March 2011, the usually resident population of Ballygowan Ward was 2,957 (1,077 households). Of these:

- 21.39% were aged under 16 years and 12.27% were aged 65 and over;
- 49.40% of the usually resident population were male and 50.60% were female, and 40 years was the average (median) age of the population.
- 99.09% were from the white (including Irish Traveller) ethnic group;
- 11.22% belong to or were brought up Catholic and
- 80.19% belong to or were brought up in a 'Protestant and Other Christian (including Christian related)'denominations;
- 75.81% indicated that they had a British national identity, 7.12% had an Irish national identity and 33.69% had a Northern Irish national identity (Respondents could indicate more than one national identity)

=== 2021 Census ===
On census day in 2021, the usually resident population of Ballygowan was 3,138 (1,246 households). Of these:

- 51% were male, 49% were female
- 99% were from the white (including Irish Traveller) ethnic group
- 8% belong to or were brough up Catholic
- 78% belong to or were brought up as Protestant or other Christian religions
- 13% belong to no religion
- 52% identified as British only, 3% identified as Irish only and 21% identified as Northern Irish only. Respondents could indicate more than one national identity.
- 2% indicated some ability in Irish language, 12% indicated some ability in Ulster Scots

== Education ==
=== Primary ===
Ballygowan has one primary school locally, seen at the top of the table below. Other schools are nearby.

School Name	Location	Ref
Alexander Dickson PS	Ballygowan	
Carrickmannon PS	Ballygowan	
Moneyrea PS	Moneyreagh	
Millennium Integrated PS	Saintfield	

=== Secondary ===
Ballygowan does not have any secondary schools locally, but those nearby (<10 mi (16 km) away) are seen in the table below;

School Name	Location	Ref
Saintfield High School	Saintfield	
Lagan College	Castlereagh	
Grosvenor Grammar School	Castlereagh	

== Transport ==
=== Bus ===
Ballygowan has a bus depot connecting Ballygowan to Belfast (12/512), Comber (5b), Darragh Cross (12/512), Moneyreagh (12/512) and Newtownards (5b). These routes are run by Translink Ulsterbus.

=== Railways ===
Ballygowan railway station was opened by the Belfast and County Down Railway on 10 September 1858. The station was on the once rail network that connected Belfast Queen's Quay railway station to Downpatrick and Newcastle, County Down. The station closed on 15 January 1950 along with the rest of the Belfast and County Down Railway line, by which time it had been taken over by the Ulster Transport Authority.

== See also ==
- List of villages in Northern Ireland
- List of towns in Northern Ireland
