= Saintfield High School =

Location
- 21 Comber Road; Saintfield, County Down, BT24 7BB; Northern Ireland

Information
- Type: Controlled Secondary
- Motto: Individual excellence
- Established: 1958; 68 years ago
- Status: Open
- Local authority: Education Authority
- Principal: Miss Sarah-Lucy Hynds
- Staff: 57
- Gender: Co-Educational
- Age: 11 to 16
- Enrollment: 435 (2018)
- Capacity: 370
- Colour
- Website: https://www.saintfieldhighschool.com/

Saintfield High School is a secondary school in Saintfield, County Down, Northern Ireland that teaches compulsory education up to GCSE level. It was established in 1958. Miss Sarah-Lucy Hynds is the current principal of the school.

== History ==
Saintfield High first opened under the name Saintield Secondary Intermediate School in 1958 with only 5 teachers and 154 students, with its first principal being Mr Johnston Young. The schools name was changed to its current name by Principal Mr Ronald MacPherson during his tenure between 1975-1988.

The school celebrated its 60th anniversary in 2018.

== Buildings ==
In 1991, then principal Mr Robert Mills began improving the buildings to accommodate for an increase in demand for student places at the school. This included improvements to "school fabric and structure" and the addition of some temporary classrooms.

In June 2004, Mr Mills retired as works were going to start on a new extension to the existing buildings. This project was overseen by the new principal Mrs Vivian Watt. The new extension opened in 2006.

In 2016, the school opened its new sports hall, with an accompanying reception area, and is officially named the "Vivien Watt Sports Hall".

The school buildings have solar panelling installed on the roof.

== GCSE Success Rate ==
The school states that, in 2022, 92% of students achieved 5 or more GCSE grades at A* A*-C. with 85% of all students achieving 5 or more GCSE grades at A*-C including English and maths.

== See also ==
- List of secondary schools in Northern Ireland
- Education in Northern Ireland
