= Killinchy =

Village in County Down, Northern Ireland

Coordinates: 54°28′N 5°40′W

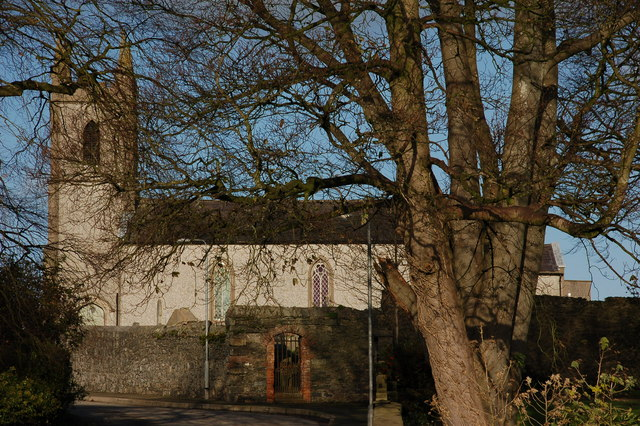
Killinchy Church of Ireland

Killinchy (from Irish Cill Dhuinsí, meaning 'Duinseach’s church') is a townland and small village in County Down, Northern Ireland. It is two miles inland from the western shores of Strangford Lough in the Borough of Ards and North Down. It is situated in the townland of the same name, the civil parish of Killinchy and the historic barony of Dufferin. It had a population of 539 people (205 households) in the 2011 Census. (2001 Census: 492 people)

The village sits on a hill overlooking Strangford Lough. The nearby settlement of Balloo is treated as part of Killinchy. Sketrick Castle is located near Killinchy and is estimated to date back to the 15th century. The Annals of the Four Masters record the capture of the castle in 1470. It was intact until the end of the 19th century when a storm demolished much of it. In 1957 a stone subterranean passage was discovered.

Killinchy has a community hall and a playground. Killinchy has three churches: Killinchy Presbyterian Church, Killinchy Non-Subscribing Presbyterian Church and Killinchy Church of Ireland. In 1978 a new church hall, car park and playing fields were built, on the opposite side of the road to the Presbyterian church, to complement the Anderson Memorial Hall (built 1898). The Moore Graveyard sits at the top of the car park.

== See also ==
John Livingstone
