= Comber =

Town in County Down, Northern Ireland

Coordinates: 54.550278°N 5.745278°W

Comber: Irish: an Comar; Scots: Commer
- Town
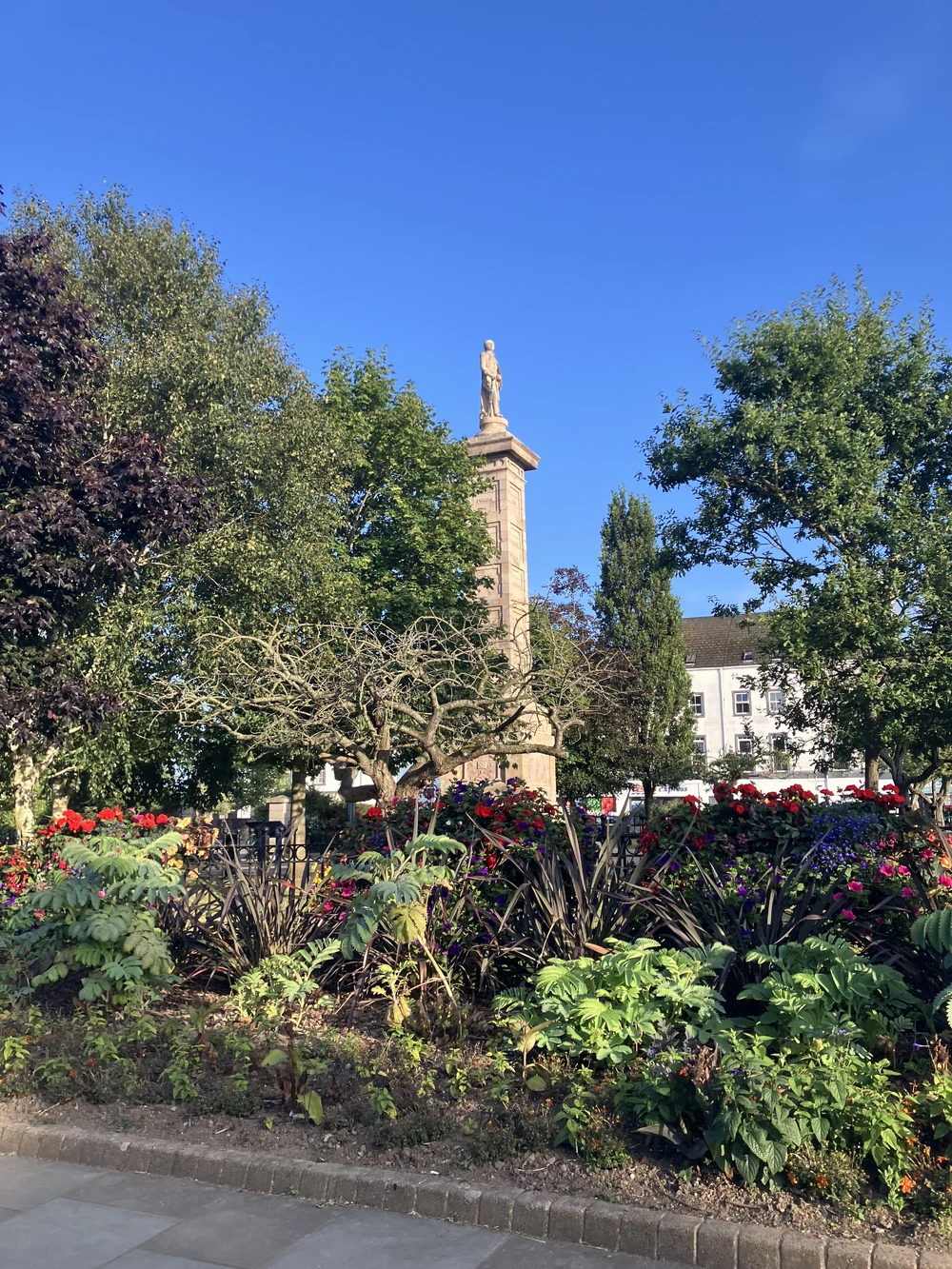
- Rollo Gillespie statue & monument

- Location within County Down
- Population: 9,529 (2021 Census)
- Irish grid reference: J 45944 69241
- District: Ards and North Down
- County: County Down
- Country: Northern Ireland
- Sovereign state: United Kingdom
- Post town: NEWTOWNARDS
- Postcode district: BT23
- Dialling code: 028
- Police: Northern Ireland
- Fire: Northern Ireland
- Ambulance: Northern Ireland
- UK Parliament: Strangford
- NI Assembly: Strangford

Comber (from Irish An Comar, meaning 'the confluence' /ˈkʌm(b)ər/, CUM-ber, locally cummer) is a historic market town in County Down, Northern Ireland. It lies 5 miles (8 km) south of Newtownards, at the northern end of Strangford Lough. It is situated in the townland of Town Parks, the civil parish of Comber and the historic barony of Castlereagh Lower. Comber is part of the Ards and North Down Borough. It is also known for Comber Whiskey which was last distilled in 1953. A notable native was Thomas Andrews, the designer of the RMS Titanic and was among the many who went down with her. Comber had a population of 9,529 people in the 2021 census.

== History ==
The confluence of two rivers, which gave the town its name, is that of the Glen River and the Enler River which meet here.

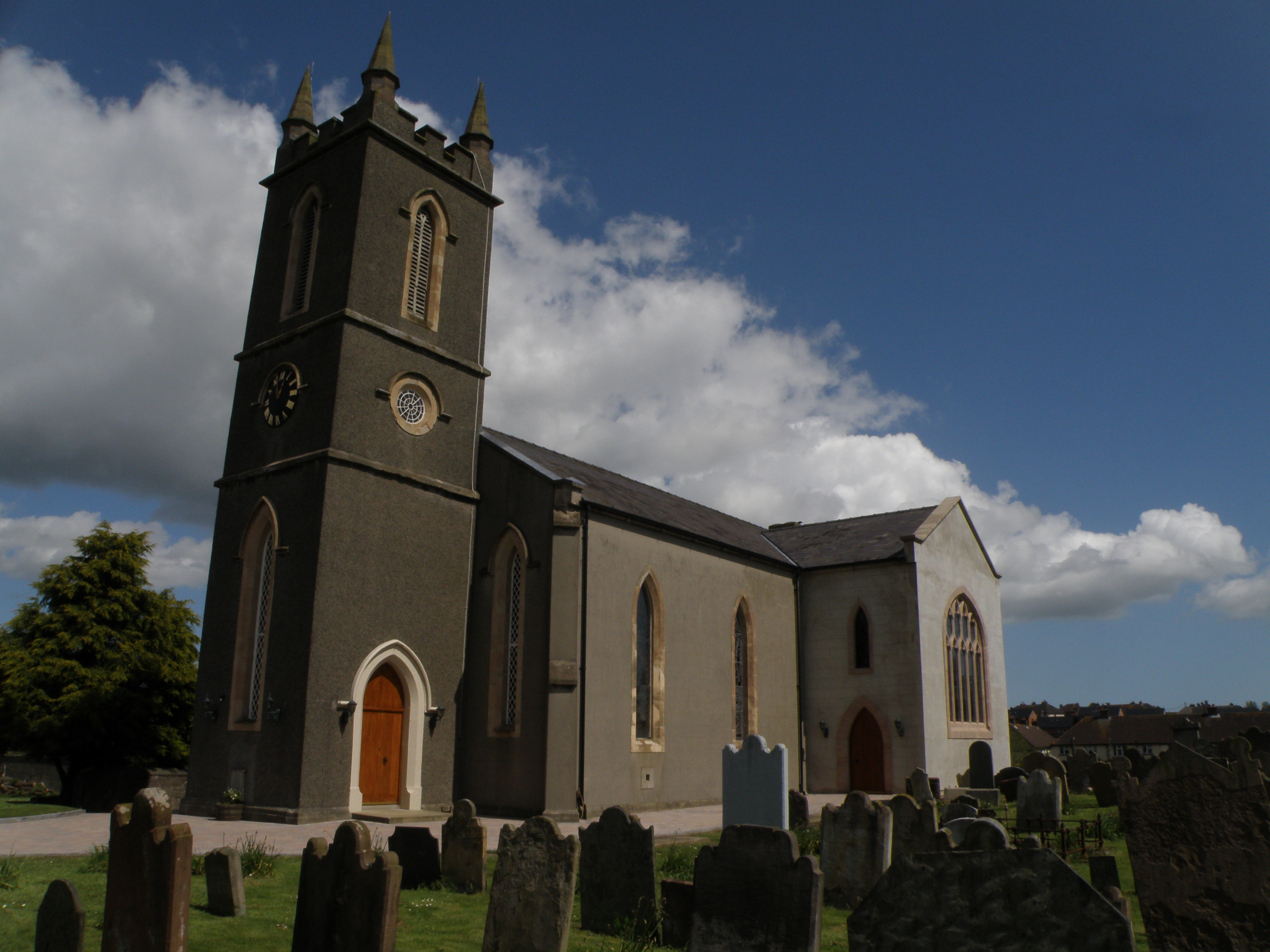
St. Mary's Church of Ireland

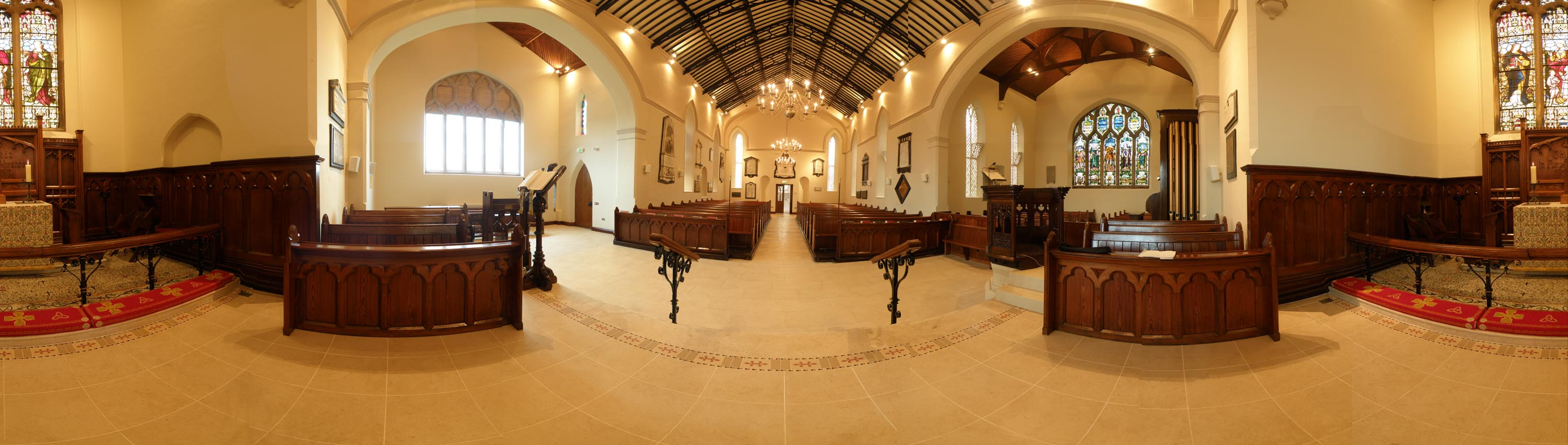
Interior of St. Mary's Church of Ireland

During the influx of Scots in the early 1600s (see Plantation of Ulster), a settlement grew up at Comber, although it was focused about one mile (1.6 km) further south than at present, in the townland of Cattogs, and there is evidence that the settlement was a port used by traders and fishermen. By the 1700s, however, the focus of the town had moved to the area of the present main Square and Comber became established as an industrial centre with several mills.

The Andrews family made Comber a centre of both linen production and grain processing by the second half of the 1700s. Whiskey distilling was a prominent industry by the mid-1800s, the most prominent of the distillers being John Miller, uncle of William James (Lord) Pirrie and Eliza (wife of Thomas Andrews Snr.). One member of the Andrews family, Thomas Andrews, was the designer of the RMS Titanic and lost his life when the ship sank in 1912. By 1841 the town had 1,400 inhabitants. The 20th century saw Comber lose much of its industry but re-establish itself as a commuter town for the Belfast urban area, swelling in population from 4,000 in 1961 to 8,933 according to the 2001 census.

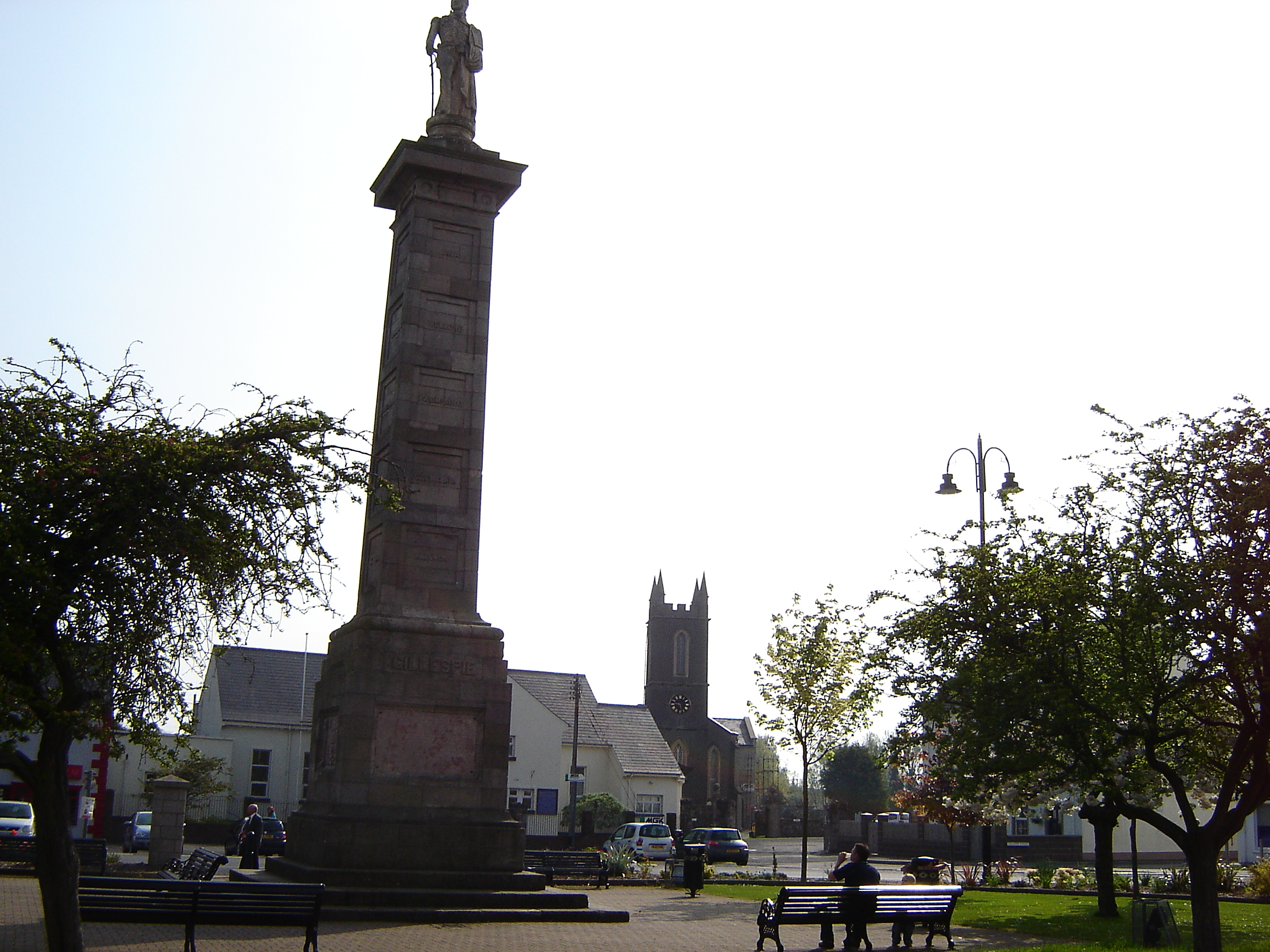
The Square. The Gillespie Memorial and St. Mary's Parish Church can also be seen.

In Comber's square stands the statue of Major General Rollo Gillespie. Gillespie was a local war hero from the 19th century, famous for his heroic exploits in India. It was constructed under the oversight of John Fraser, the first county surveyor of Down, and was unveiled on 24 June 1845 (St. John's Day). Fifty lodges of the Masonic Order were present, in what is believed to be the biggest Masonic gathering in Irish history. It was calculated that 25,000 to 30,000 people crowded into the town to witness the ceremony. The column is 55 feet high. At the foot of the column are many Masonic symbols and his famous last words "One shot more for the honour of Down". The Square also has a memorial to those who died on the Titanic, which has strong links to the town. The town has its own "Comber Titanic Audio Trail which guides you to special places of interest throughout Comber that relate to the Titanic story."

In 1978, the Provisional Irish Republican Army bombed La Mon restaurant, killing 12 people.

The Enler River in Comber has flooded many times. As a result, the Comber flood wall was built along the river through the town which has held the water back since.

== The town ==
Comber grew as a market town with many family-run and independent businesses, throughout the 19th and 20th centuries. The town still remains home to a number of independent and artisan stores. The town holds a farmers market on the first Thursday of every month. The market sells fresh, seasonal food and plant products.

After achieving EU Protected Geographical Indication status in 2012, the Comber potato (Comber Earlies) became a global brand. The potatoes are now celebrated annually at the Comber Earlies Food Festival in June, together with the Comber Earlies Growers.

The town has also benefitted from a £2.4 million public realm scheme. The scheme encompassing High Street, The Square, Bridge Street, Bridge Street Link, Killinchy Street and Castle Street has reinvigorated Comber, creating a unique and uniform identity for the town centre. The design concepts were developed in partnership with Ards Borough Council, and, community and business representatives. Making the announcement, Minister McCausland said: "This represents a significant investment by the Northern Ireland Executive and Ards Borough Council. The scheme has been designed to bring the maximum benefit to all of Comber's residents and to make the town centre much more attractive to visitors. This scheme is a fundamental part of the strategy 'Envisaging the future of Comber'. "I know from the success of public realm schemes in other towns, that this investment will make a significant contribution to improving the fortunes of the town centre. This funding demonstrates my ongoing commitment to the regeneration of Comber." Mayor of Ards, Councillor Stephen McIlveen, welcomed the confirmation of funding. He said: "This investment by DSD and the Council will transform the visual appearance of the town centres, enhancing their appeal as places to visit and shop, with the associated positive economic impact. I look forward now to seeing the designs developed and finalised and to work beginning."

Like the rest of Ireland, the Comber area has long been divided into townlands, whose names mostly come from the Irish language. Over time, more rural townlands have been built upon and they have given their names to many roads and housing estates. The following is a list of townlands within Comber's urban area, alongside their likely etymologies:

- Ballyaltikilligan (from Baile Ailt Uí Ghiollagáin meaning "townland of O'Gilligan's glen" or Baile Ailt Cille Aodháin meaning "townland of the glen of Aodan's church")
- Ballyhenry Minor (from Baile Héinrí or Baile Éinrí meaning "Henry's townland")
- Ballymagaughey (from Baile Mhig Eacháin meaning "MacGaughey's townland")
- Carnasure or Carnesure (from Ceathrú na Siúr meaning "quarterland of the sisters")
- Glass Moss formerly Ballynaganemye (from Baile na Gainimhe meaning "townland of the sand")

The Comber Greenway is a 7-mile (11 km) traffic-free section of the National Cycle Network, along the old Belfast-Comber railway line. The cycle path starts on Dee Street in Belfast and finishes at Comber. Now completed the Greenway provides an eco-friendly cycle path with views of Stormont and Scrabo Tower. This attracts many cyclists into the town boosting the local economy. The current route of the Greenway was originally used as the route for the Belfast and County Down Railway. The railway was in use from the 1850s to 1950 when it was permanently retired. Throughout the 1950s the track was lifted in stages and infrastructure, including bridges, removed. Local activists and politicians have proposed plans to extend the Greenway into the town centre directly which they say would benefit the local businesses even more.

Castle Espie is a wetland reserve managed by the Wildfowl and Wetlands Trust (WWT) on the banks of Strangford Lough, three miles (5 km) south of Comber, County Down, Northern Ireland. It is part of the Strangford Lough Ramsar Site. It provides an early wintering site for almost the entire Nearctic population of Pale-bellied Brent Geese. The Castle which gave the reserve its name no longer exists. Castle Espie was officially opened as a Wildfowl and Wetlands Trust centre by Lady Scott on 4 May 1990. The site had previously been a limestone quarry, and also had a brickworks, pottery and lime kilns for producing lime from limestone, as well as part of a farm.

In September 2007, the Heritage Lottery Fund awarded a grant of £2.96 million towards a major wetland restoration project at Castle Espie, the largest investment in biodiversity in Northern Ireland. At the heart of the project, costing £4m in all, will be the restoration and improvement of intertidal and freshwater habitats along the shores of Strangford Lough to encourage more species and greater numbers of waterbirds to feed, roost or breed at Castle Espie, as well as restoring important habitats. A new ecologically sustainable visitor centre would also be constructed, and other improvements would be carried out to hides and observatories.

== Transport ==
Comber railway station on the Belfast and County Down Railway, opened on 6 May 1850, but finally closed on 24 April 1950. Comber also has a good public transport network with buses travelling to Belfast and Newtownards everyday on a frequent basis.

In 2003 'phase two' of the Comber bypass was officially opened for traffic. This new section starts at the end of the dual carriage way from Newtownards and links up with the existing section via a roundabout on Killinchy street. Comber is also connected by a direct cycle route to Belfast. Known as the Comber Greenway, this traffic free cycle path runs for 7 miles (11 km) along the old railway track bed.

== Education ==
One of the three local primary schools is Comber Primary School. There are 15 teachers at the school. Notable alumni include Northern Ireland footballer Stephen Craigan.

The other local primary school is Andrews Memorial Primary School, operating under the headmaster, Ralph Magee, which is of a similar size and as part of the school buildings includes the Andrews Memorial Hall, which was built by the citizens of Comber in memory of Thomas Andrews, the shipbuilder of the RMS Titanic.

The third primary school is St. Mary's Primary School, which is much smaller in size.

Many pupils from these schools go to Nendrum College, Comber, next door to Comber Primary, and Regent House Grammar School, Newtownards.

== Demography ==
=== 2021 Census ===
On Census day 2021 there were 9,529 people living in Comber. Of these:

- 76.97% (7,334) belong to or were brought up in a 'Protestant and Other Christian (including Christian related)' religion, 6.67% (636) belong to or were brought up in the Catholic faith, 1.1% (105) belonged to Other religions and 15.25% (1,453) had no religious background
- 72.27% (6,887) indicated that they had a British national identity, 38.39% (3,658) had a Northern Irish national identity and 5.94% (566) had an Irish national identity (respondents could indicate more than one national identity)
- 12.99% (1,238) had some knowledge of Ulster-Scots and 1.78% (170) had some knowledge of the Irish language

=== 2011 Census ===
On Census day (27 March 2011) there were 9,071 people living in Comber (3,811 households), an increase of 1.5% on the Census 2001 population of 8,933. Of these:

- 17.66% were aged under 16 years and 17.59% were aged 65 and over
- 52.19% of the usually resident population were female and 47.81% were male
- 85.08% belong to or were brought up in a 'Protestant and Other Christian (including Christian related)' religion and 4.65% belong to or were brought up in the Catholic faith
- 77.63% indicated that they had a British national identity, 30.75% had a Northern Irish national identity and 4.83% had an Irish national identity (respondents could indicate more than one national identity)
- 42 years was the average (median) age of the population
- 10.09% had some knowledge of Ulster-Scots and 1.98% had some knowledge of the Irish language

== Culture ==
The Comber District Loyal Orange Lodge is a name for the 18 Orange Lodges that make up the Comber District LOL No. 15. They are a significant part of the Orange Order and host parades including their annual Comber Twelfth of July.

The Kilmood Art Club is an organization that brings together local artists and other members of the community. The club holds regular meetings, workshops, and exhibitions.

=== Marching Bands ===
A variety of marching bands originate in Comber, these include Pride of Comber Flute Band, Crimson Star Flute Band, Goldsprings True Defenders Flute Band, Comber Accordion Band and Comber Pipe Band.

Richard Parkes is a pipe major from Comber, who led the Field Marshal Montgomery Pipe Band for 44 years, and won 13 Pipe World Championships in competitive piping. He also placed first at the All Ireland 7 times, the Ulster Championships 9 times and the Piper of the Year 8 times. This has made Parkes the most successful pipe major in pipe band history.

== Sport ==
=== Athletics ===
The Ballydrain Harrier and Athletic Club was founded in 1932 and originally trained from The Old Schoolhouse, Ballydrain. For many years it was one of the most successful clubs in Northern Ireland, but went into decline, and by 2010 had only a few members left. A move to training at the North Down Cricket Club brought about a resurgence in membership, continuing to grow quickly with members training and racing weekly.

=== Motorsport ===
The Ards Circuit through Comber was a motorsport street circuit used for RAC Tourist Trophy sports car races from 1928 until 1936. At the time it was Northern Ireland's premier sporting event, regularly attracting crowds in excess of a quarter of a million people.

=== Football ===
One of Comber's finest sporting moments came on Christmas morning 1991 when local amateur football team Comber Rec., managed by Mervyn Boyce, overcame favourites Brantwood to lift the Steel and Sons Cup for the first time. Comber also lifted the trophy again on Christmas Day 2023 defeating Crumlin Star managed by former Irish League defender Gareth McKeown

=== Cricket ===
Comber is also the home of one of Ireland's oldest and most successful cricket clubs, North Down Cricket Club, which has played its home matches at The Green since 1857. It has won the NCU Challenge Cup a record 30 times, the NCU Senior League outright on 17 occasions and the Irish Senior Cup 3 times since its inception in 1984.

=== Hockey ===
North Down Hockey Club is a field hockey club affiliated to the Ulster Hockey Union. The club was founded in 1896. The club was formed by members of North Down Cricket Club in 1896 and is one of the founder-members of the Ulster Hockey Union. The first reported Club match in Ulster was played in Comber against Cliftonville on 7 November 1896, with North Down winning 8–0. In 1899-1900 North Down won their first two trophies. In the only year when the Keightley Cup for the Ulster Senior League was played for on a knock-out basis, Antrim were defeated 3–2 in the final and in the Kirk Cup Final Cliftonville were beaten 4–2.

North Down Hockey Club is based at The Green in Comber, home of North Down Cricket Club. The first hockey pitch was at the Castle Lane side of the ground on the cricket outfield. A celebration game against Cliftonville as part of the Centenary was played on this same pitch.

In 1994 the decision was taken to play all first team games on the artificial turf pitch at Glenford Park, Newtownards. In 1999 the team returned to Comber and now play at Comber Leisure Centre. The Club still uses the synthetic pitch at Glenford Park and also at Nendrum College, Comber so that all home games are played on synthetic surfaces.

== People ==
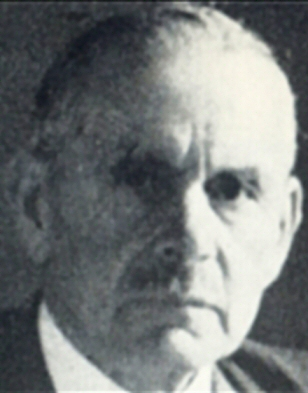
John Miller Andrews

- Comber is most famous for being the birthplace of Thomas Andrews (born in 1873), the RMS Titanic's shipbuilder, who died in the sinking of the Titanic in 1912.
- John Miller Andrews (1871–1956) was Northern Ireland's second Prime Minister between 1940 and 1945. He was born in 1871 and became a flax-spinner and a wealthy landowner in Comber.
- Sir Robert Rollo Gillespie (1766–1814) reached the rank of Major-General, campaigning against the French in the West Indies and also in India. He participated in the Vellore Mutiny and in Sumatra where he fought against the Sultan. He was killed in action storming a Gurkha fort in Kalunga, Dehradun, India.
- Racing driver Jonny Kane (born 14 May 1973), was born in Comber. He was crowned British Formula Three champion in 1997 and went on to become 'rookie of the year' in the 1999 IndyLights series in the United States.

Edward de Wind Blue Plaque

- Edmund De Wind, was born in Comber and was a Canadian (also considered Irish) recipient of the Victoria Cross in World War I. He was a member of The Royal Irish Rifles, killed during the 1918 Battle of the Somme on 21 March 1918, after repelling attack after attack until he was mortally wounded and collapsed. There is a housing estate in Comber named after him built in the 1950s. Edmund was officially remembered in Comber on Friday 14 September 2007 through the unveiling of an Ulster History Circle "Blue Plaque" in his honour. He was educated at Campbell College, Belfast.
- Richard Parkes, the most successful pipe major in pipe band history.
- Former Northern Ireland footballer Stephen Craigan hails from the town. Stephen played 54 times for his country in a career spanning 18 years. He retired in May 2012 at Motherwell FC to pursue a career in the media. Stephen attended local schools, Comber Primary and Comber High School (now Nendrum College).
- The jazz singer Ottilie Patterson (1932–2011) was born in Comber.
- Filmmaking twins Roy and Noel Spence (born 1944) were born in Comber, which has also been home to two cinemas owned by the brothers, the Tudor Cinema and the Excelsior.

== See also ==
- List of localities in Northern Ireland by population
- List of civil parishes of County Down
- Nendrum Monastery
