= Strangford II =

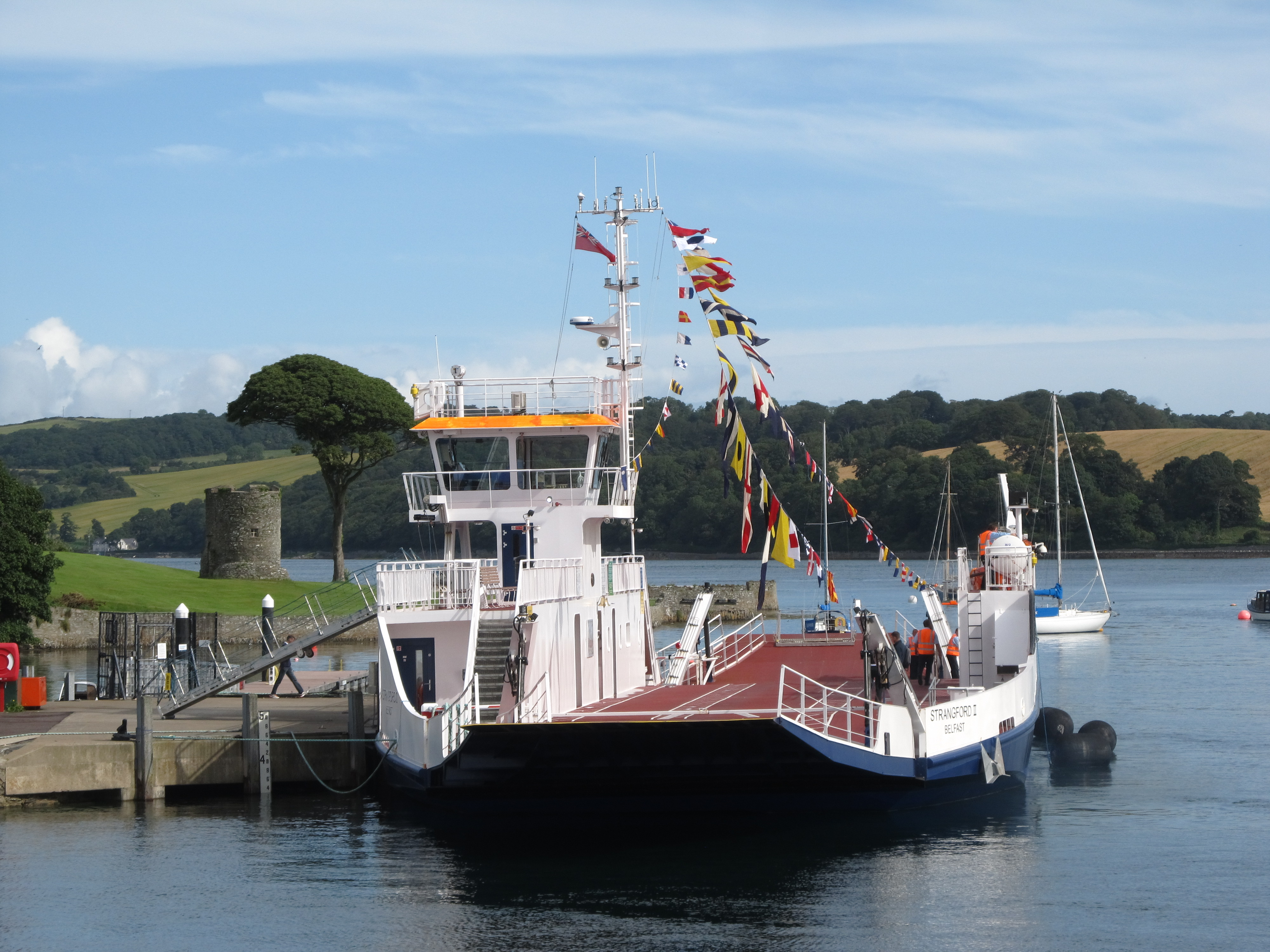
- Strangford II dressed overall for her official naming

History
- Name: Strangford II
- Owner: Department for Infrastructure
- Operator: Transport NI
- Builder: Cammell Laird, Birkenhead, England
- Yard number: 1389
- Launched: 2016
- In service: 2 February 2017 - present
- Home port: Belfast
- Identification: IMO number: 9771561
- Status: In service

General characteristics
- Tonnage: 405 GT
- Length: 40.5 m (133 ft)
- Beam: 14.6 m (48 ft)
- Draught: 1.95 m (6 ft 5 in)
- Capacity: 260 passengers, 27 cars

Strangford II is a passenger and car ferry operated by Transport NI. This ferry serves the Portaferry–Strangford ferry route across the mouth of Strangford Lough in Northern Ireland, a service which has been in operation since the 12th century.

== History ==
The Strangford II was built by Cammell Laird in Birkenhead, England. She was delivered in 2016, but it was initially found that vessel was unable to discharge cars at high tide due to a specification error, which delayed entry into service. The vessel finally entered service in February 2017, and was formally named in July of that year by the Duke of Kent.

In August 2021, the Strangford II was criticised by crew members about the exhaust fumes from the vessels, saying that it was a risk to both crews and passengers health after crew members reported feeling Dizzy, headaches and chest conditions. There have been calls to install an exhaust stack on the vessel similar to that on the Portaferry II, which releases fumes high up. However the department for Infrastructure says that emissions are within "exceptable limits". No firm solution to the problem has been decided.

In March 2022, the vessel was removed from service for a period of 15 months for upgrades. It returned to service in May 2023.

== Details ==
The Strangford II has a gross tonnage of 405 tons, a hull length of 40.5 metres (133 ft), a beam of 14.6 metres (48 ft), a draught of 1.95 metres (6 ft 5 in) and a capacity of 260 passengers and 27 cars. She is propelled by a pair of Voith Schneider propellers, driven by diesel engines, and is registered in Belfast.
