= Portaferry =

Village on the Ards Peninsula, Northern Ireland

Coordinates: 54.3809°N 5.5486°W

Portaferry: Irish: Port an Pheire
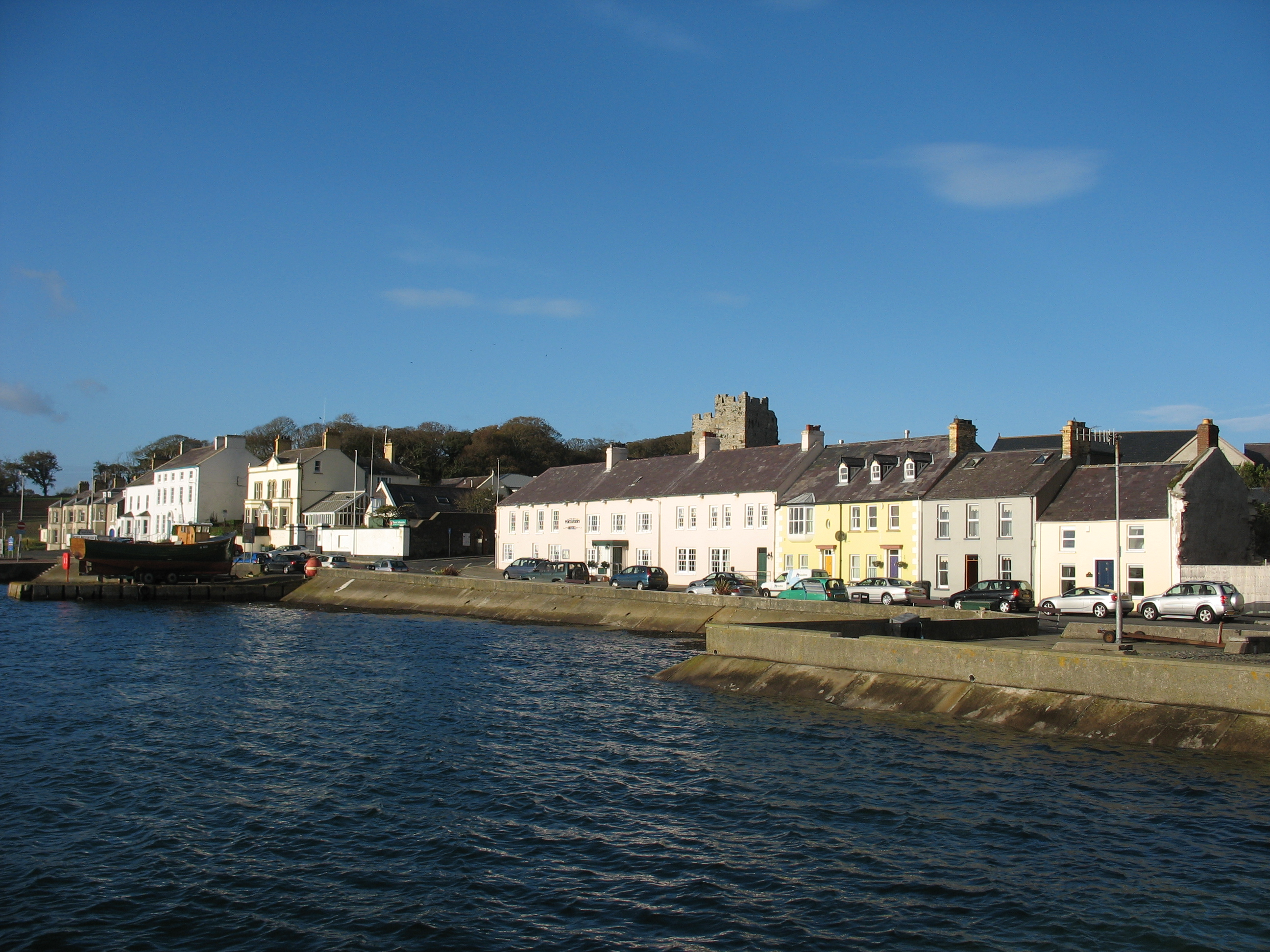
- Portaferry from the pier towards the north

- Location within County Down
- Population: 2,372 (2021 census)
- Irish grid reference: J594509
- District: Ards and North Down Borough
- County: County Down
- Country: Northern Ireland
- Sovereign state: United Kingdom
- Post town: NEWTOWNARDS
- Postcode district: BT22
- Dialling code: 028
- Police: Northern Ireland
- Fire: Northern Ireland
- Ambulance: Northern Ireland

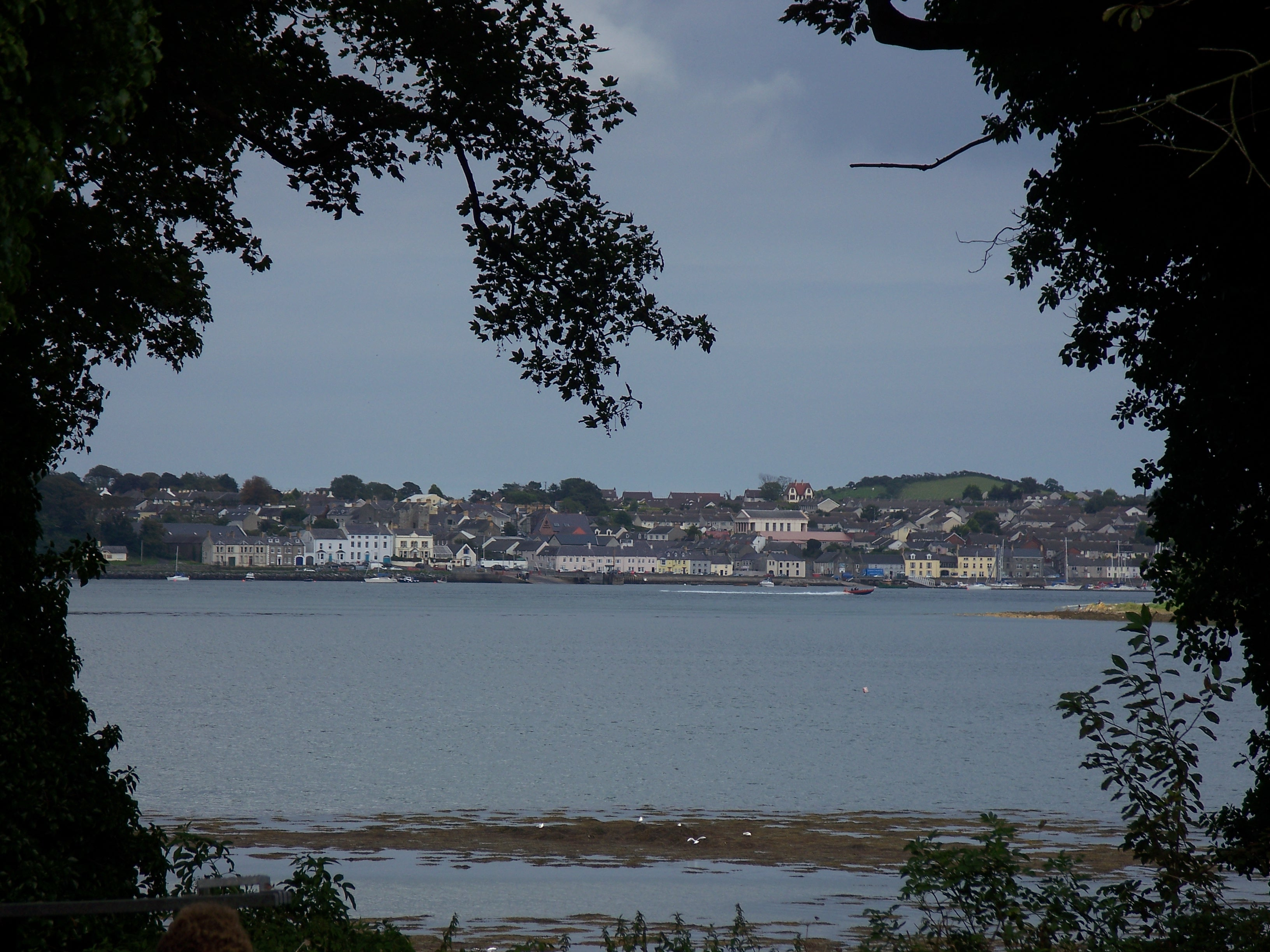
Portaferry from the grounds of Castle Ward, on the opposite bank of Strangford Lough

Portaferry (from Irish Port an Pheire 'landing place of the ferry') is a village in County Down, Northern Ireland, at the southern end of the Ards Peninsula, near the Narrows at the entrance to Strangford Lough. Portaferry village, which had a population of 2,372 people in the 2021 census, is in the historical barony of Ards Upper.

The area is home to the Exploris aquarium and is known for the annual Gala Week Float Parade. It is home to a small marina, the Portaferry Marina. The Portaferry–Strangford ferry service operates daily at 30-minute intervals between the villages of Portaferry and Strangford, less than 1.5 km apart, with over 21,000 sailings per annum. Pot fishing, mainly for prawns and crabs and licensed shellfish farming takes place within Strangford Lough. Queen's University of Belfast have a marine research laboratory on the shorefront. The village is also home to a research centre for Swedish tidal-kite developer Minesto.

Portaferry Lifeboat, an Royal National Lifeboat Institution (RNLI) vessel based in the area, is a "lifeline" for local fishermen and yachtsmen. The Atlantic 75 is the fastest seagoing lifeboat in the RNLI's fleet and is capable of speeds up to 34 knots.

== History ==
About two miles from Portaferry is Cooey's Wells which had a church thought to date to the about the 7th century. Three wells reputed to have healing properties are located at that site.

The Anglo-Norman Savage family, who had arrived in Ireland with John de Courcy, settled in the area in the 12th century. The Savage family built a number of structures in the area, including Portaferry Castle, a small 16th-century tower house overlooking Portaferry harbour. The castle's ruin is now a historic monument in state care. Portaferry Windmill, to the south east of the town, was also built by members of the Savage family in the 18th century. It was destroyed by a fire in 1878. The Savage family, later known as Nugent, were also associated with Portaferry House. This house was completed by Andrew Savage (Nugent) in the mid-18th century.

The Portico church in Portaferry was built by the local Presbyterian congregation in 1841. The church, which is a Grade A listed building, replaced a number of earlier churches on the same site. St Patrick's Church in Ballyphilip, in the Catholic parish of Portaferry, was built in 1762. The local Church of Ireland (Anglican) church is also in Ballyphlip. The town's Methodist church was built in the mid-19th century and extensively renovated in the early 20th century.

== Industry ==
Portaferry historically played a part in the region's linen industry. Many of the women in the town were employed to embroider handkerchiefs for Thomas Somerset and Company, one of the major linen companies in Ireland. The company realised that the women were more productive in the summer due to the light, so installed the first electric light outside of Belfast in Ulster. Each house with a working woman was given one light fitting and bulb. There was also a bus service introduced to bring more women from the Ards Peninsula to Portaferry to work in the company's factory.

As of the 21st century, Portaferry's industrial activities include agriculture, fishing and tourism. In 2014, 'Suki Tea' announced that experimental tea-growing would commence in the area, utilising the relatively warm and dry climate, with frost protection from Strangford Lough.

The lough is a centre for experimental marine current turbine technology development. Tidal energy, unlike wind or wave, is a renewable energy resource which can be predicted. In 2008 a twin-rotor 1.2 MW SeaGen was installed and successfully demonstrated this technology until its decommissioning which began in 2017. Swedish company Minesto have tested various versions of their tidal-kite technology in the lough since 2011, and have a workshop and offices in Portaferry.

== Demographics ==
Portaferry is classified as a village by the Northern Ireland Statistics and Research Agency (NISRA) (i.e. with population less than 2,500). At the 2021 census, there were 2,372 people living in Portaferry, a decrease of about 6% on the 2011 census figure of 2,514. Of these:

- 22.3% were aged under 20 years and 14.7% were aged 70 and over
- 50.1% were male and 49.9% were female
- 99.4% were from the white ethnic group
- 81.1% belong to or were brought up in the Catholic religion and 7.8% belong to or were brought up in a 'Protestant and other Christian (including Christian related)' religion

== Environment ==
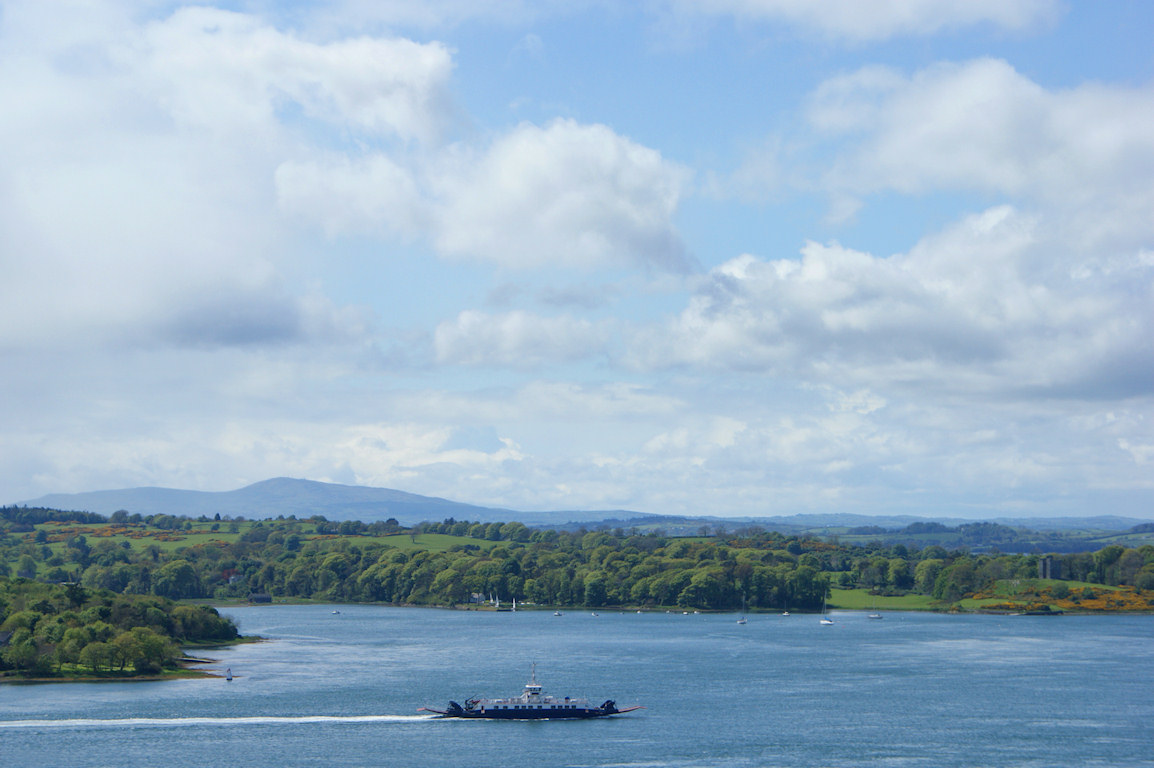
Strangford Lough View From Windmill Hill, Portaferry

The Portaferry area is popular with local and foreign tourists for its history, wildlife and visitor attractions. Strangford Lough is the largest sea inlet in the British Isles.

It is Northern Ireland's first Marine Nature Reserve and is designated as an Area of Outstanding Natural Beauty and Special Scientific Interest, with six National Nature Reserves within its reaches. Over 2,000 species of marine animals have been found in the lough and internationally important flocks of wildfowl and wading birds converge there in winter. The lough is also the most important site in Ireland for breeding common seals.

Records of algae such as Polysiphonia fibrata, Haraldiophyllum bonnemaisonii have been recorded from Portaferry.

=== Climate ===
Climate data for Lough Cowey (10m elevation) 1991–2020
Month	Jan	Feb	Mar	Apr	May	Jun	Jul	Aug	Sep	Oct	Nov	Dec	Year
Mean daily maximum °C (°F)	8.5 (47.3)	8.8 (47.8)	10.1 (50.2)	12.1 (53.8)	14.8 (58.6)	17.1 (62.8)	18.9 (66.0)	18.6 (65.5)	16.9 (62.4)	13.9 (57.0)	10.9 (51.6)	9.1 (48.4)	13.3 (55.9)
Mean daily minimum °C (°F)	3.1 (37.6)	3.1 (37.6)	3.9 (39.0)	5.1 (41.2)	7.4 (45.3)	9.8 (49.6)	11.7 (53.1)	11.7 (53.1)	10.5 (50.9)	8.1 (46.6)	5.4 (41.7)	3.7 (38.7)	7.0 (44.6)
Average rainfall mm (inches)	78.5 (3.09)	60.1 (2.37)	56.1 (2.21)	53.8 (2.12)	55.4 (2.18)	62.9 (2.48)	66.9 (2.63)	79.2 (3.12)	65.5 (2.58)	87.1 (3.43)	93.5 (3.68)	81.2 (3.20)	840.2 (33.09)
Average rainy days (≥ 1.0 mm)	13.1	11.2	10.5	10.7	11.4	10.8	11.9	13.1	10.7	12.2	14.1	13.5	143.2
Mean monthly sunshine hours	54.7	79.1	117.9	168.7	204.6	169.7	170.3	164.0	135.7	101.4	67.0	49.4	1,482.5
Source: metoffice.gov.uk

== Sport ==
Gaelic games, particularly hurling, are popular in the area and Portaferry GAC were Ulster Club Hurling Champions in 2014. There are two other Gaelic Athletic Association (GAA) clubs nearby, Ballygalget and Ballycran, and there is a rivalry between the three.

Other pursuits are sailing, coastal rowing, angling, wildfowling, and birdwatching. The town has the lough's longest established sailing club.

== People ==
- Robert Echlin, Bishop of Down and Connor (1612–1635), is buried in the ancient ruins of Templecraney, Portaferry off Church St.
- Hugh Glass, the Australian pastoralist, was born in Portaferry in 1817.
- Ciara Mageean, middle-distance runner, was born in Portaferry in 1992
- Sycerika McMahon, swimmer, is from Portaferry
- Ryan McMullan, singer/songwriter, is from Portaferry
- Vincent McNabb, priest, philosopher and poet, was born in Portaferry
- Joseph Tomelty, actor and playwright, was born in Portaferry in 1911.

== Gallery ==
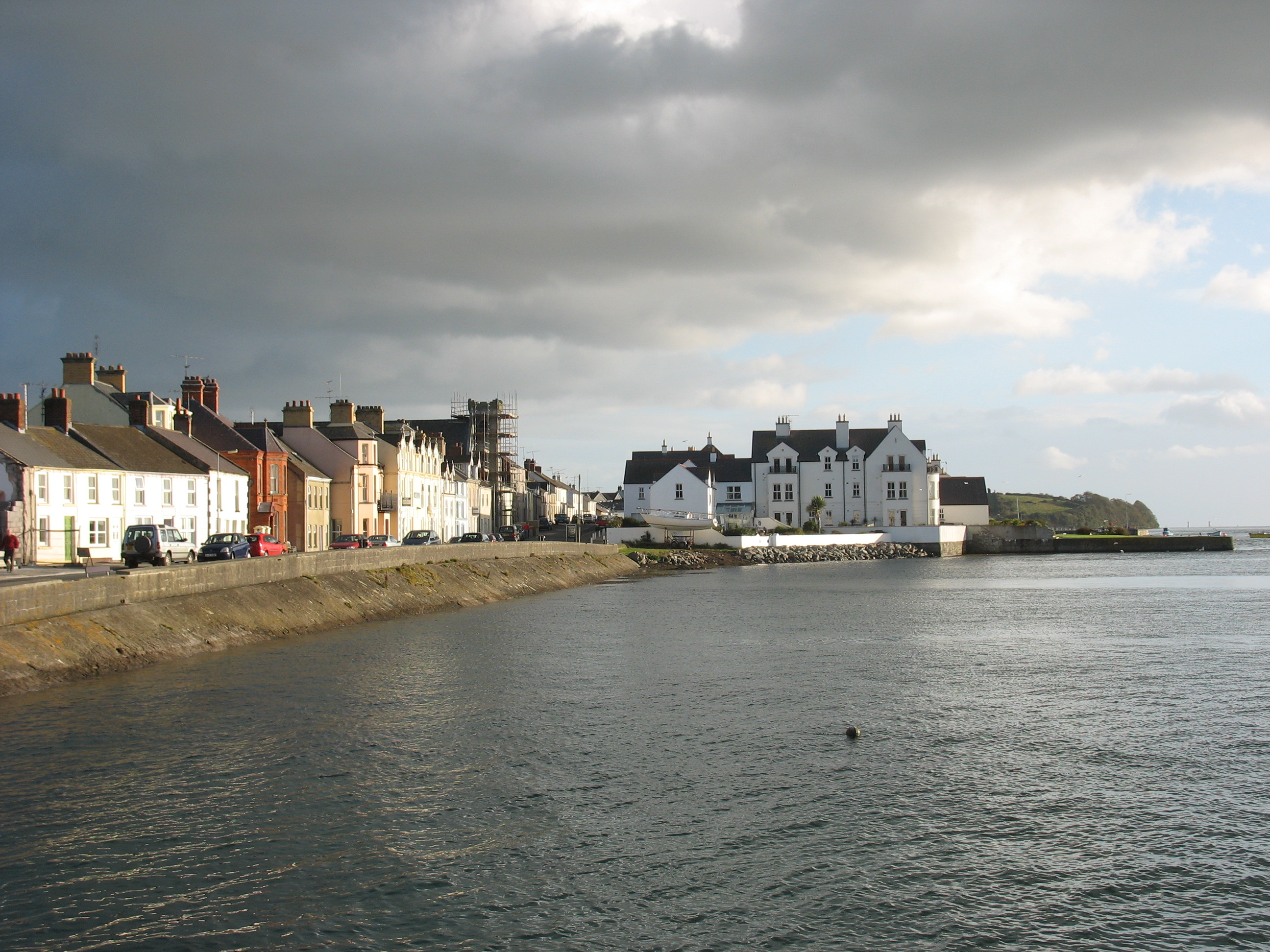
Portaferry from the pier towards the south

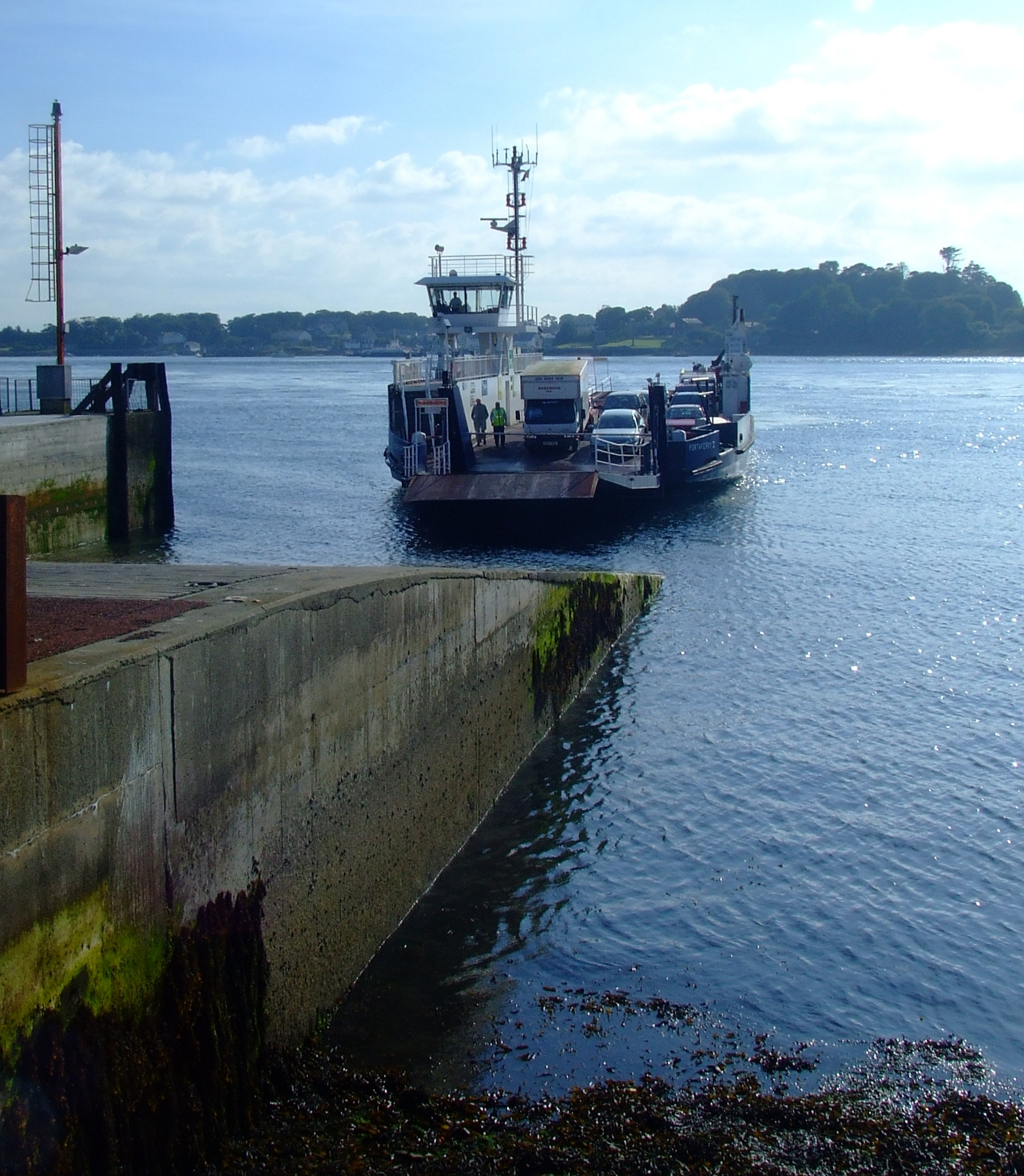
The Portaferry II returning from Strangford.

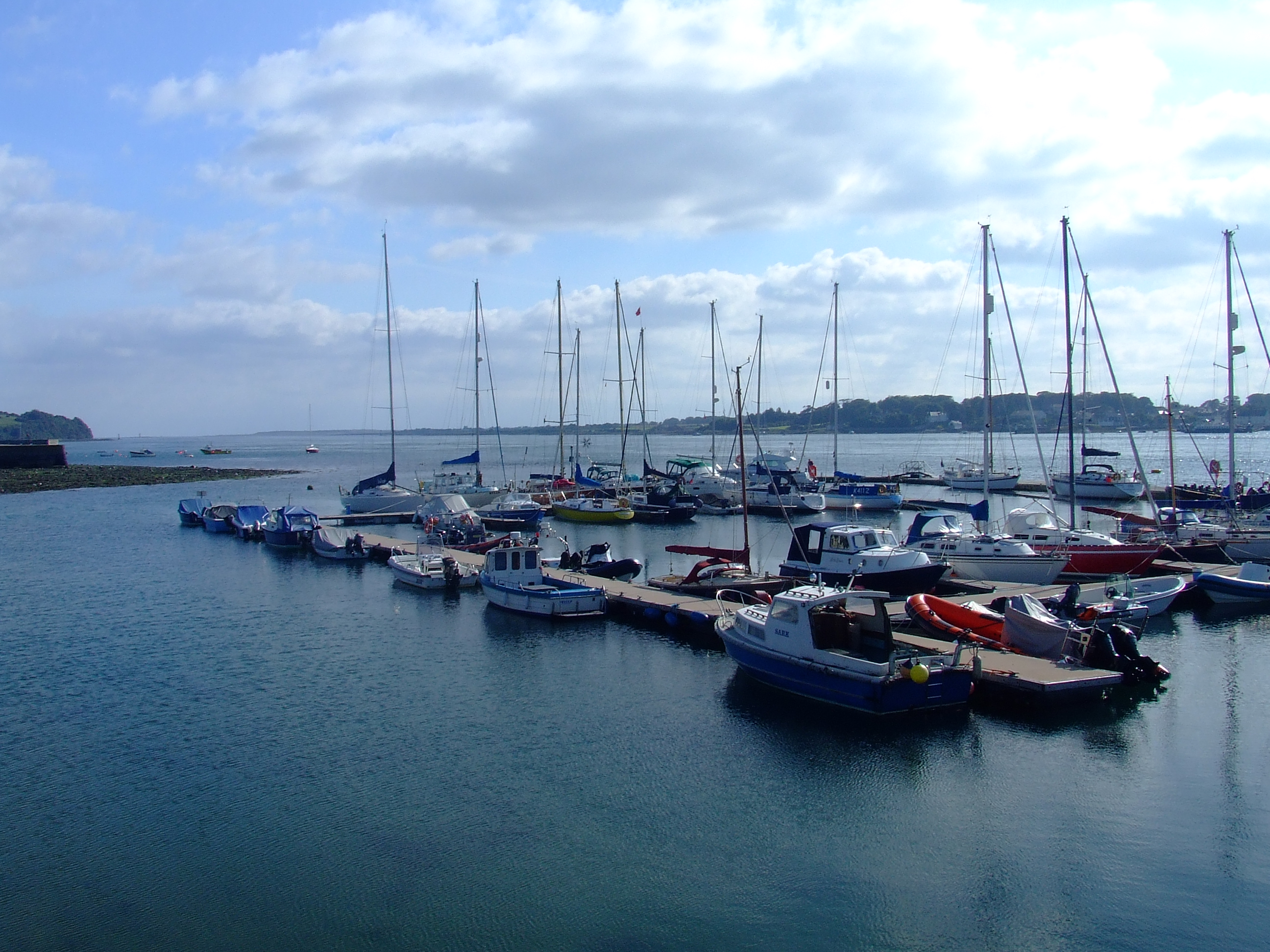
Portaferry Marina.

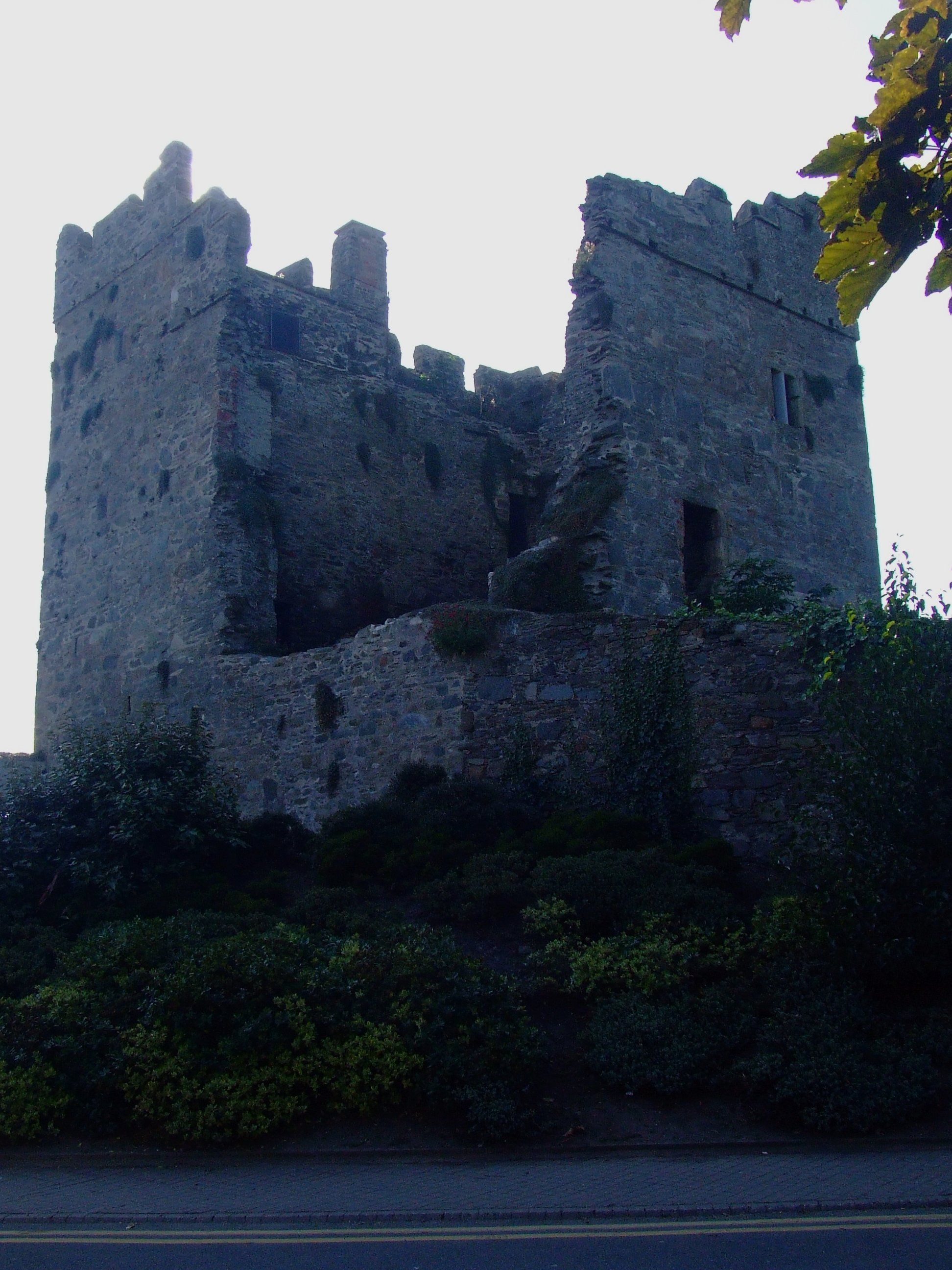
Portaferry Castle.

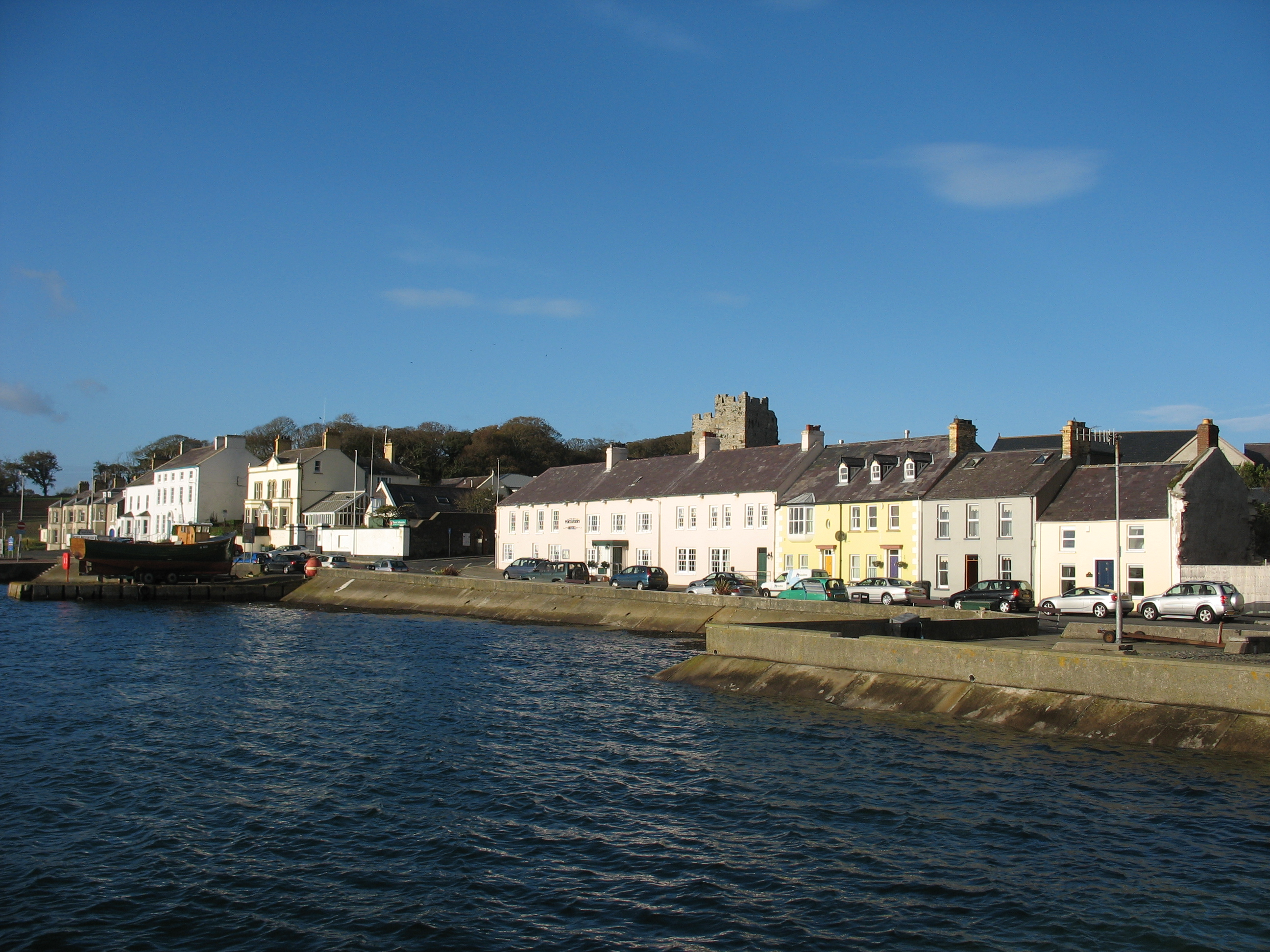
Portaferry from the pier towards the north

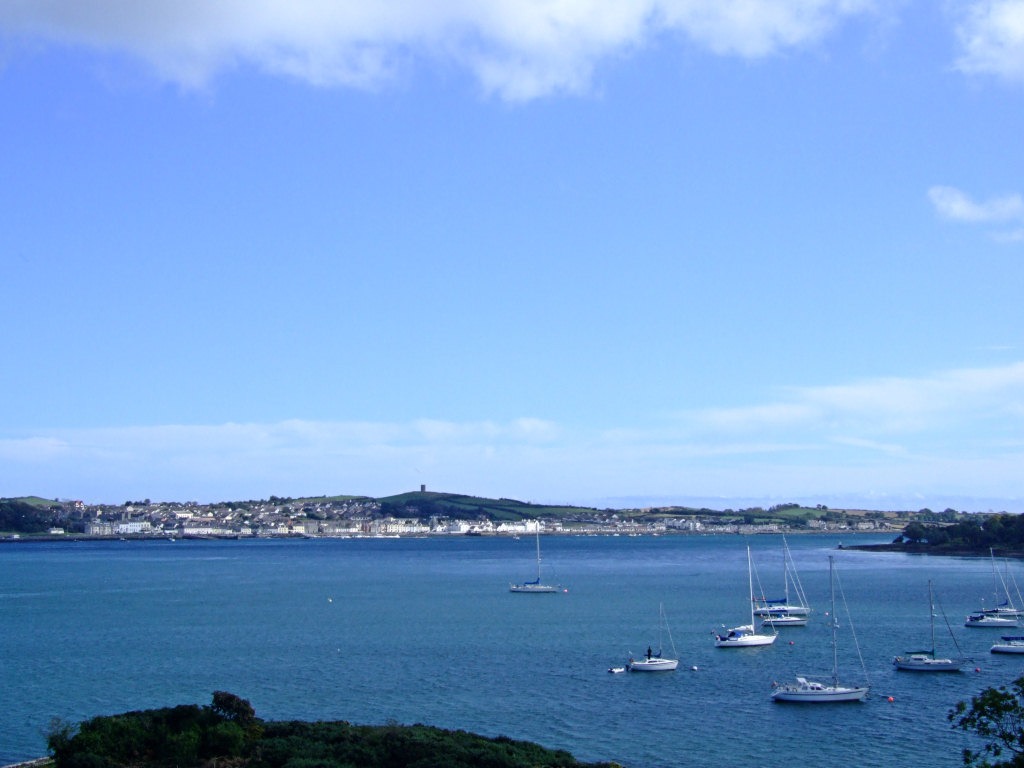
Portaferry from Castleward

== See also ==
- List of towns and villages in Northern Ireland
- List of RNLI stations
- Market houses in Northern Ireland
