= Portaferry II =

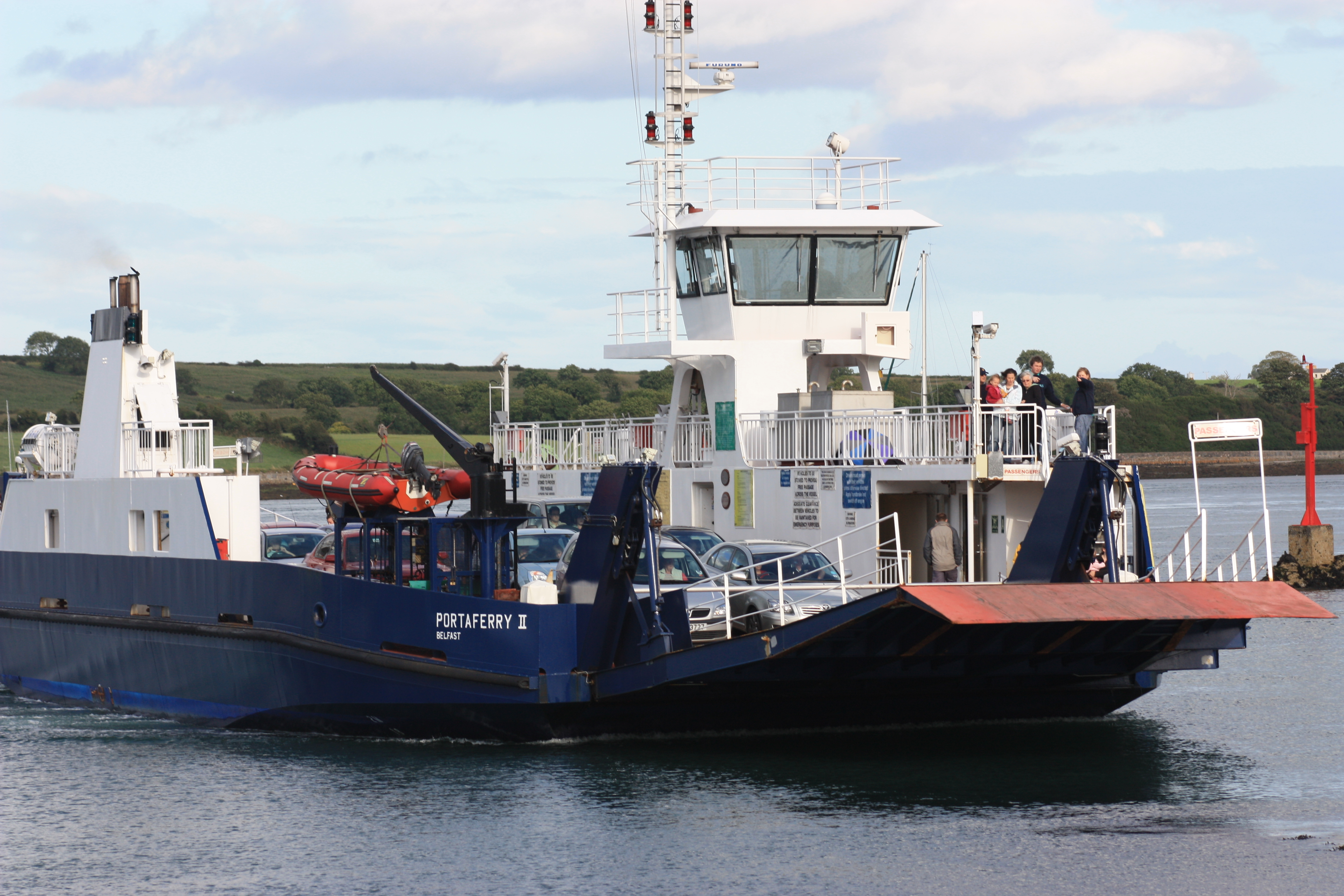
- Portaferry II coming to dock in Strangford

History
- Name: MV Portaferry II
- Owner: Department for Infrastructure
- Operator: Transport NI
- Builder: McTay Marine, Merseyside, England
- Yard number: 127
- Launched: 2001
- In service: 18 December 2001 - present
- Home port: Belfast
- Identification: IMO number: 9237436; MMSI number: 235003307; Callsign: ZNXC8
- Status: In service

General characteristics
- Tonnage: 312 GT
- Length: 38.2 m (125 ft)
- Beam: 14.56 m (47.8 ft)
- Draught: 1.9 m (6 ft 3 in)
- Capacity: 260 passengers, 20 cars

Portaferry II is a passenger and car ferry operated by Transport NI. This ferry serves the Portaferry–Strangford ferry route across the mouth of Strangford Lough in Northern Ireland, a service which has been in operation since the 12th century.

== History ==
After years of service, Strangford Ferry, which was launched on 6 September 1969, began to show signs of age. A second, smaller ship, Portaferry Ferry, also operating on the Portaferry - Strangford route, had insufficient capacity to take over full service for route, so a new ship was needed. This new vessel was the Portaferry II, built by McTay Marine of Merseyside, England at a cost of a £2.7 million. She entered service on 18 December 2001, replacing the aging Portaferry Ferry and relegated the Strangford Ferry, to a support role.

== Details ==
The Portaferry II has a gross tonnage of 312 tons, a hull length of 38.2 metres (125 ft), a beam of 14.56 metres (47.8 ft), a draught of 1.9 metres (6 ft 3 in) and a capacity of 260 passengers and 20 cars. She is propelled by a pair of Voith Schneider propellers, driven by diesel engines, and is registered in Belfast.

Like her predecessors, due to the short travel time the only onboard facilities are a passenger waiting area and a gangway on one side of the ship with benches and placards to inform readers of the lough's wildlife.
