= Portaferry–Strangford ferry =

Passenger and motor vehicle service in Northern Ireland

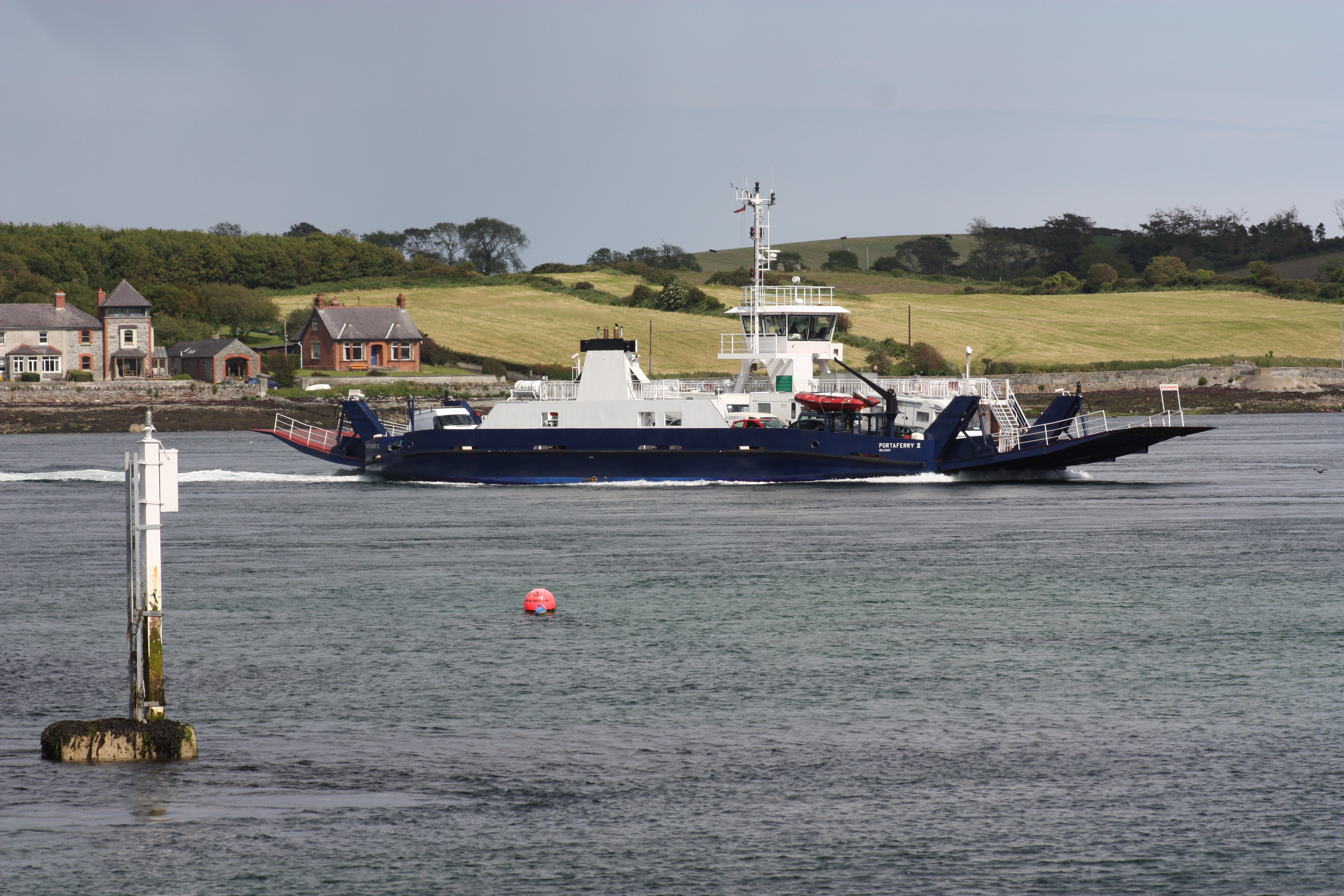
- Locale: County Down, Northern Ireland
- Waterway: Strangford Lough
- Transit type: Passenger and automobile ferry
- Owner: NI Department for Infrastructure
- Operator: Transport NI
- Began operation: 1611 or earlier
- System length: 0.6 nmi (0.69 mi; 1.1 km)
- No. of vessels: 2
- No. of terminals: 2

The Portaferry–Strangford ferry service crosses Strangford Lough in Northern Ireland at its narrowest point, close to where the lough joins the Irish Sea. The ferry links the two disconnected sections of the A2 road, Muff to Portaferry and Strangford to Newry. There has been a ferry service between Portaferry and Strangford for four centuries without a break. The alternative road journey is 47 miles (76 km), while the ferry crosses the 0.6 nautical miles (0.69 mi; 1.1 km) in 8 minutes.

== History ==
In 1611 James I granted land on either side of the Lough to Peirce Tumolton in order to maintain and crew a ferry boat. In 1835 a group of local people formed the "Portaferry and Strangford Steamboat Company" and commissioned the building of the Lady of the Lake, which was the first steam ferry in Ireland. This venture was not commercially successful and the ferry was sold in 1839. In 1913 three passengers were lost when a ferry capsized. In 1946 two converted World War II landing craft were introduced, capable of accommodating about 36 passengers and two motor cars, but the following year one of these capsized with the loss of one life.

Various vessels were in use until 1969 when the Down District Council took over operation of a ferry capable of carrying vehicles and passengers. To operate the service, Strangford was built by the Verolme Shipyard in Cork.

In 1975 the Welsh ferry Cleddau King was purchased and used as reserve ferry under the name Portaferry Ferry.

In 2001, a new vessel named Portaferry II was brought into service, relegating Strangford to a support role and releasing the Portaferry Ferry for disposal.

A second new vessel, Strangford II, was delivered in 2016 but her introduction was delayed until February of the following year when it was discovered that she was unable to discharge cars at high tide. In 2021 ferry workers reported feeling dizzy and sick while onboard the vessel. The vessel was then removed from service in March 2022 for a period of 15 months. It returned to service in May 2023.

== Operation ==
Transport NI, an executive agency of the Department for Infrastructure, operates the ferry service. Ferries depart each terminal every 30 minutes and convey about 500,000 passengers per annum. Vehicles and their drivers are carried for a fee with additional vehicle passengers or foot passengers also charged. Senior citizens resident in either Northern Ireland or the Republic of Ireland with the appropriate documentation are permitted free passage.

The service is responsible for transporting more than 300 school students every day between schools in Portaferry, Downpatrick and Ballynahinch, County Down. The subsidised public service operates at a loss of more than £1m per year but is viewed as an important transport link to the Ards Peninsula.

During the COVID-19 pandemic the Ferry service continued to operate for essential travellers, but was severely reduced, with fewer services and fewer operating hours. Normal service was resumed in August 2020.

== Fleet ==
Name	Built	Acquired	Sold	Description	Image
PS Lady of the Lake	1836	1836	1839	A 40-ton paddle steamer built for the "Portaferry and Strangford Steamboat Company" by Alexander McLaine. She arrived at Portaferry on 18 June 1836, and was the first steam ferry in Ireland. However she was not commercially successful and was sold in 1839.	
MV Strangford Ferry	1969	1969	2018	Built for use on the Portaferry–Strangford ferry by the Verolme Shipyard in Cork and launched on 6 September 1969. She operated as the main vessel on the service until the arrival of the Portaferry II in 2001, and as the reserve vessel until the Strangford II was placed in service in 2017. She was sold to sold to Cara na nOilean, owners of the Arranmore Ferry company in February 2018 for use as a reserve vessel, but subsequently resold to Frazier Ferries for use in a similar role on their service across Lough Foyle between Greencastle and Magilligan Point. She entered service with them on 4 May 2018. The Strangford Ferry has a gross tonnage of 186 tons, and can carry 260 passengers and 20 cars.	
Portaferry Ferry (ex Cleddau King)	1962	1975	2002	Built for use on the ferry across the River Cleddau between Neyland and Pembroke Dock in Wales, by Hancock's Shipbuilding Co. of Pembroke Dock and with the name Cleddau King. When that crossing was superseded by the Cleddau Bridge in 1975, she was acquired for use as a reserve vessel on the Portaferry–Strangford ferry and modified by shipbuilders Harland and Wolff of Belfast. She operated on the route under the name MV Portaferry until sold in May 2002. The Portaferry Ferry had a gross tonnage of 151 tons.	
Portaferry II	2001	2001		Built for use on the Portaferry–Strangford ferry, by Gdańska Stocznia Remontowa and McTay Marine of Merseyside, at a cost of a £2.7 million. She entered service on 18 December 2001. The Portaferry II has a gross tonnage of 312 tons, a hull length of 38.2 metres (125 ft), a beam of 14.56 metres (47.8 ft), a draught of 1.9 metres (6 ft 3 in) and a capacity of 260 passengers and 20 cars. She is propelled by a pair of Voith Schneider propellers, driven by diesel engines.	
Strangford II	2016	2016		Built for use on the Portaferry–Strangford ferry, by Cammell Laird in Birkenhead, England. She was delivered in 2016, but it was initially found that the vessel was unable to discharge cars at high tide due to a specification error, which delayed entry into service. The vessel finally entered service in February 2017, and was formally named in July of that year by the Duke of Kent. The Strangford II has a gross tonnage of 405 tons, a hull length of 40.5 metres (133 ft), a beam of 14.6 metres (48 ft), a draught of 1.95 metres (6 ft 5 in) and a capacity of 260 passengers and 27 cars 7 more than the Portaferry II. She is propelled by a pair of Voith Schneider propellers, driven by diesel engines.	

== Gallery ==
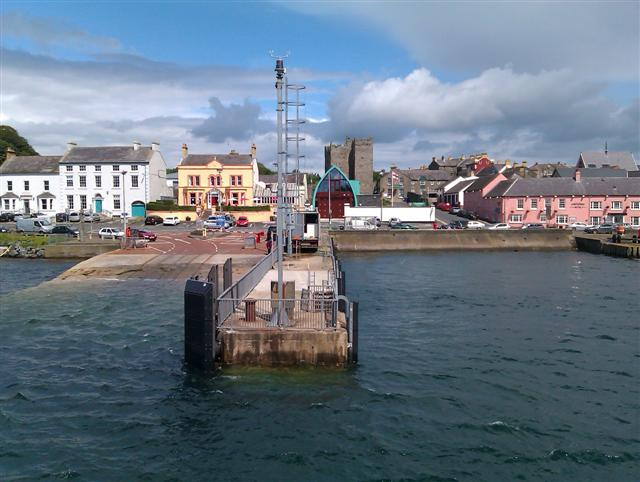
The Portaferry Ferry Terminal seen from the ferry

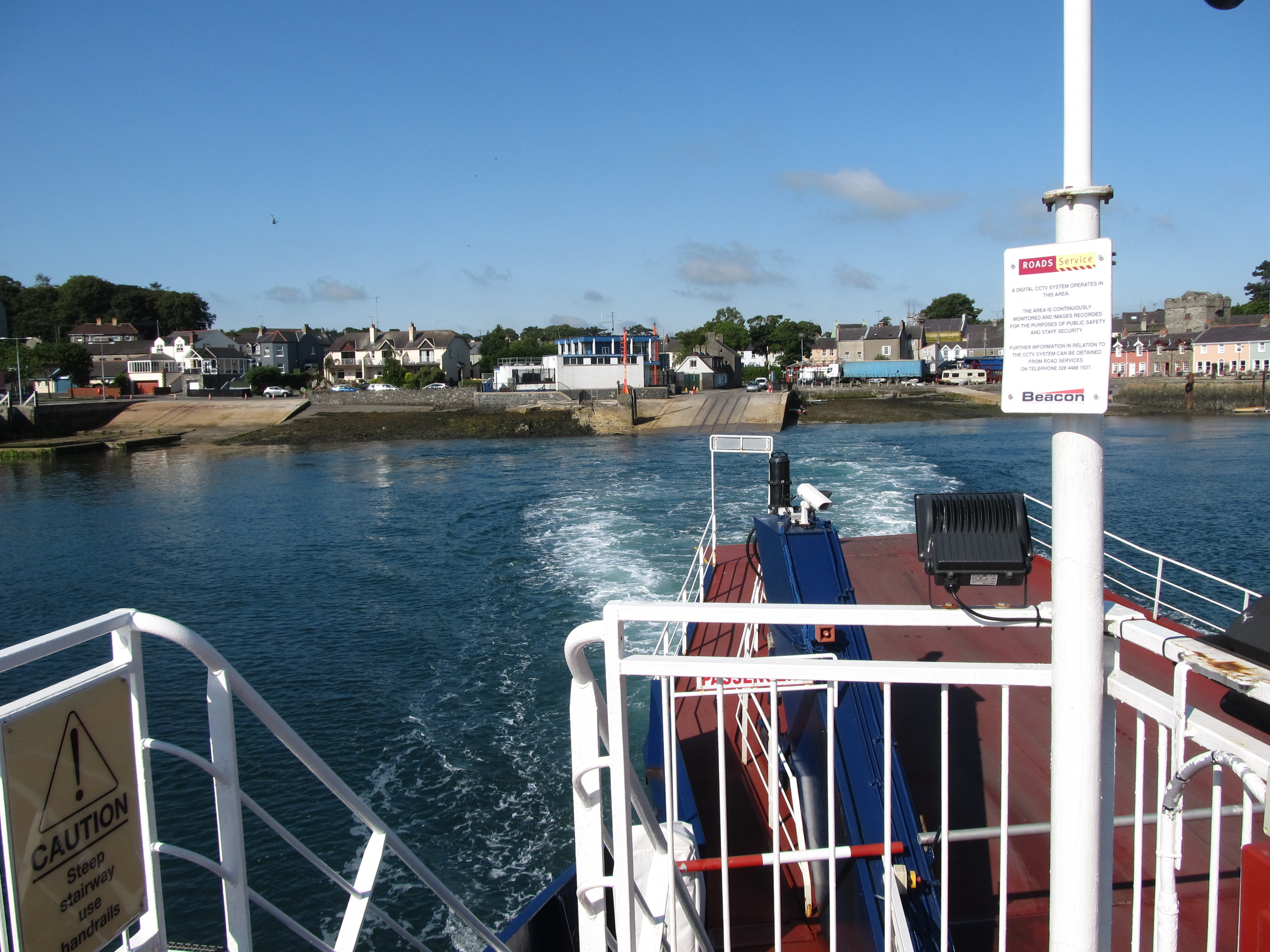
The Strangford Ferry Terminal seen from the ferry

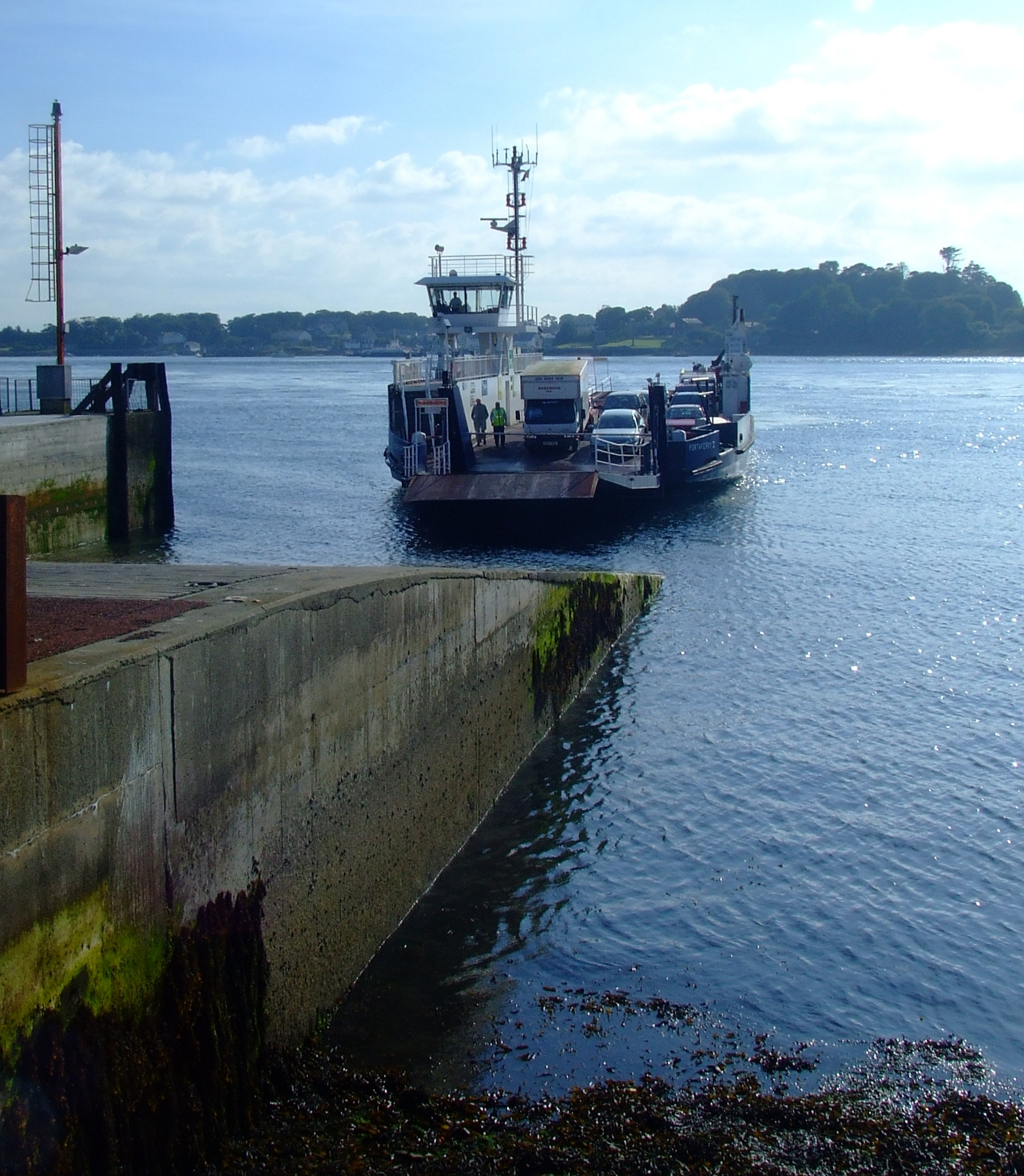
Portaferry II returning from Strangford

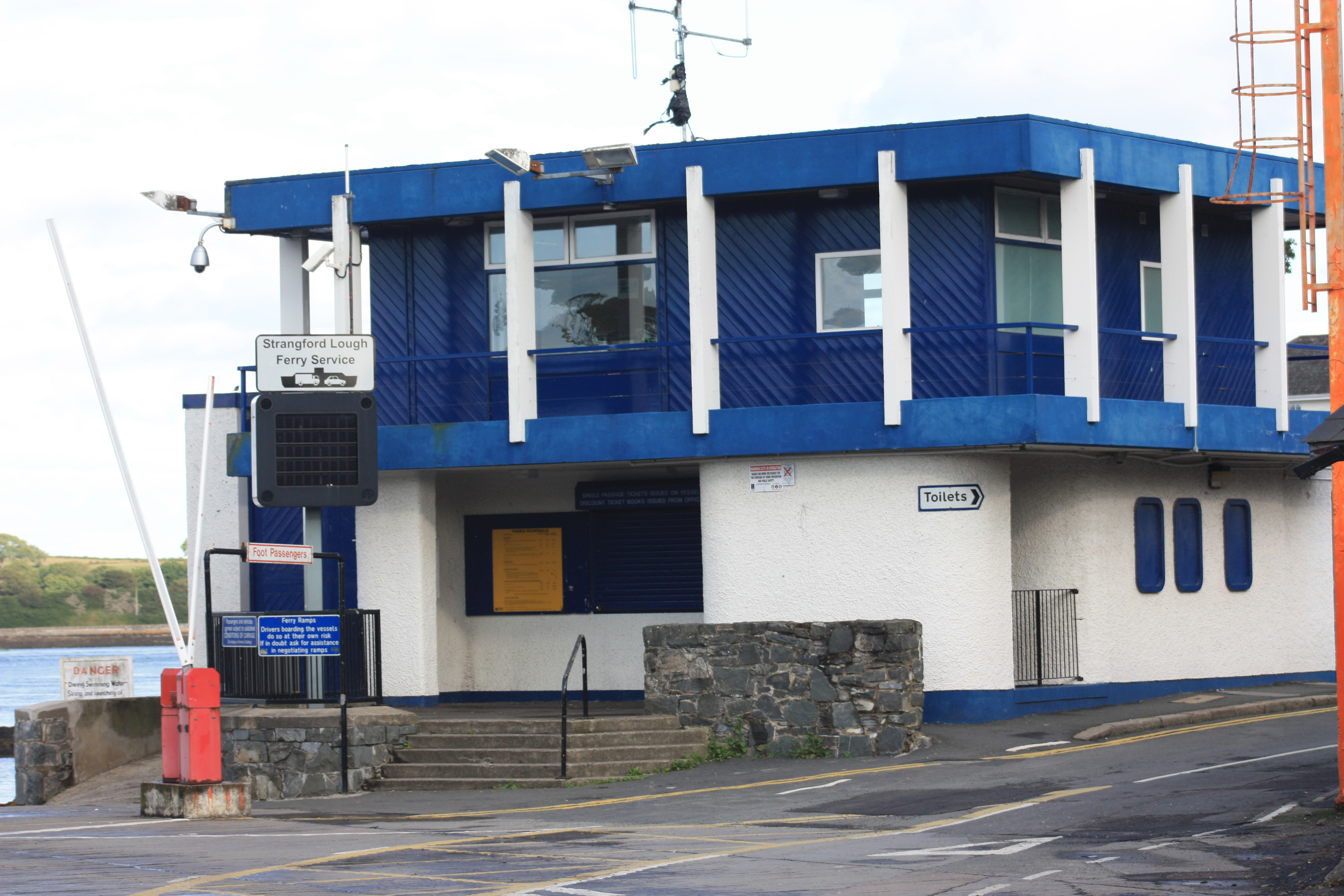
Strangford Ferry terminal in August 2009

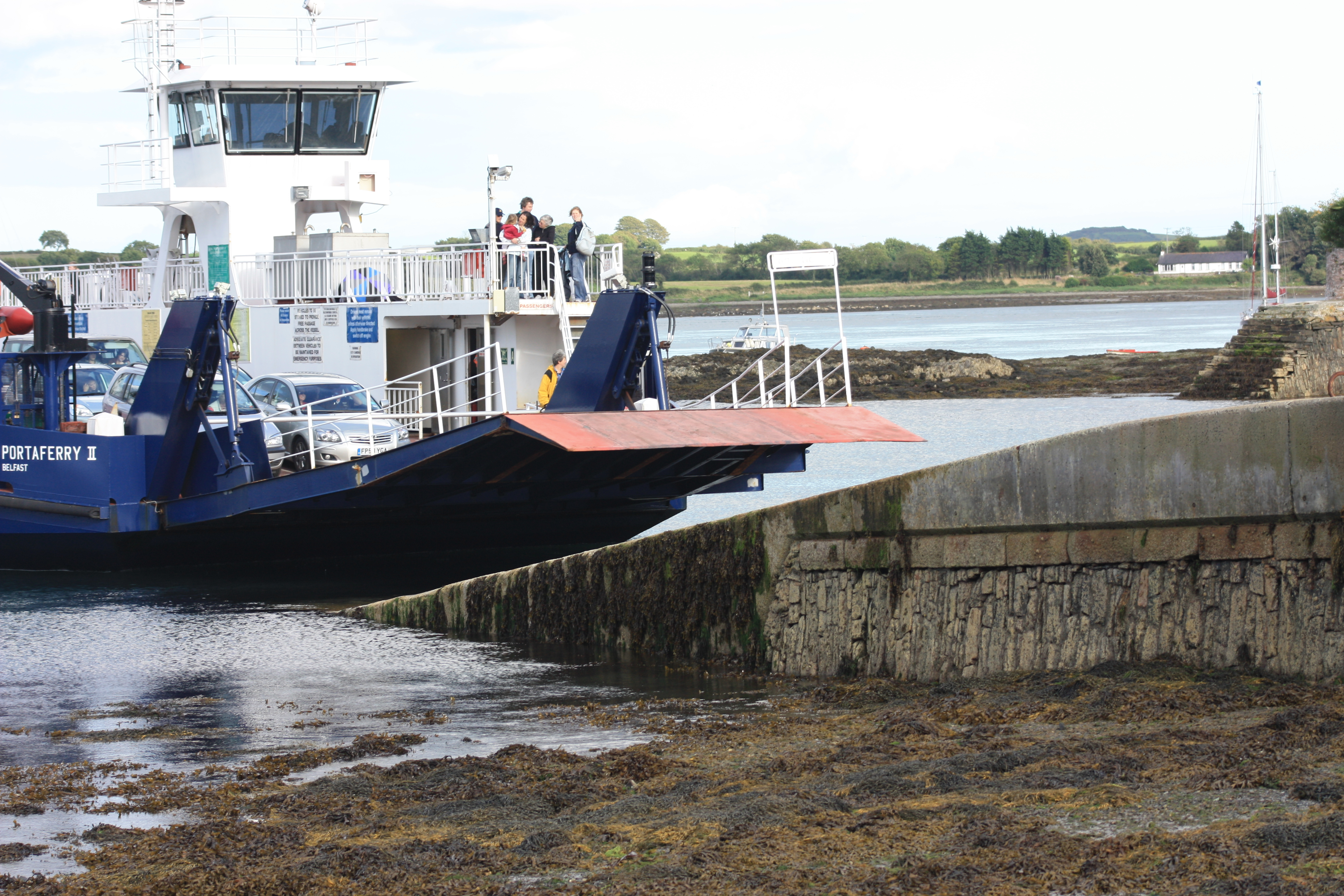
Strangford Ferry approaching Strangford slipway in August 2009
