= Strangford =

Coordinates: 54.371667°N 5.559167°W

Strangford: Irish: Baile Loch Cuan; Scots: Strangfurd
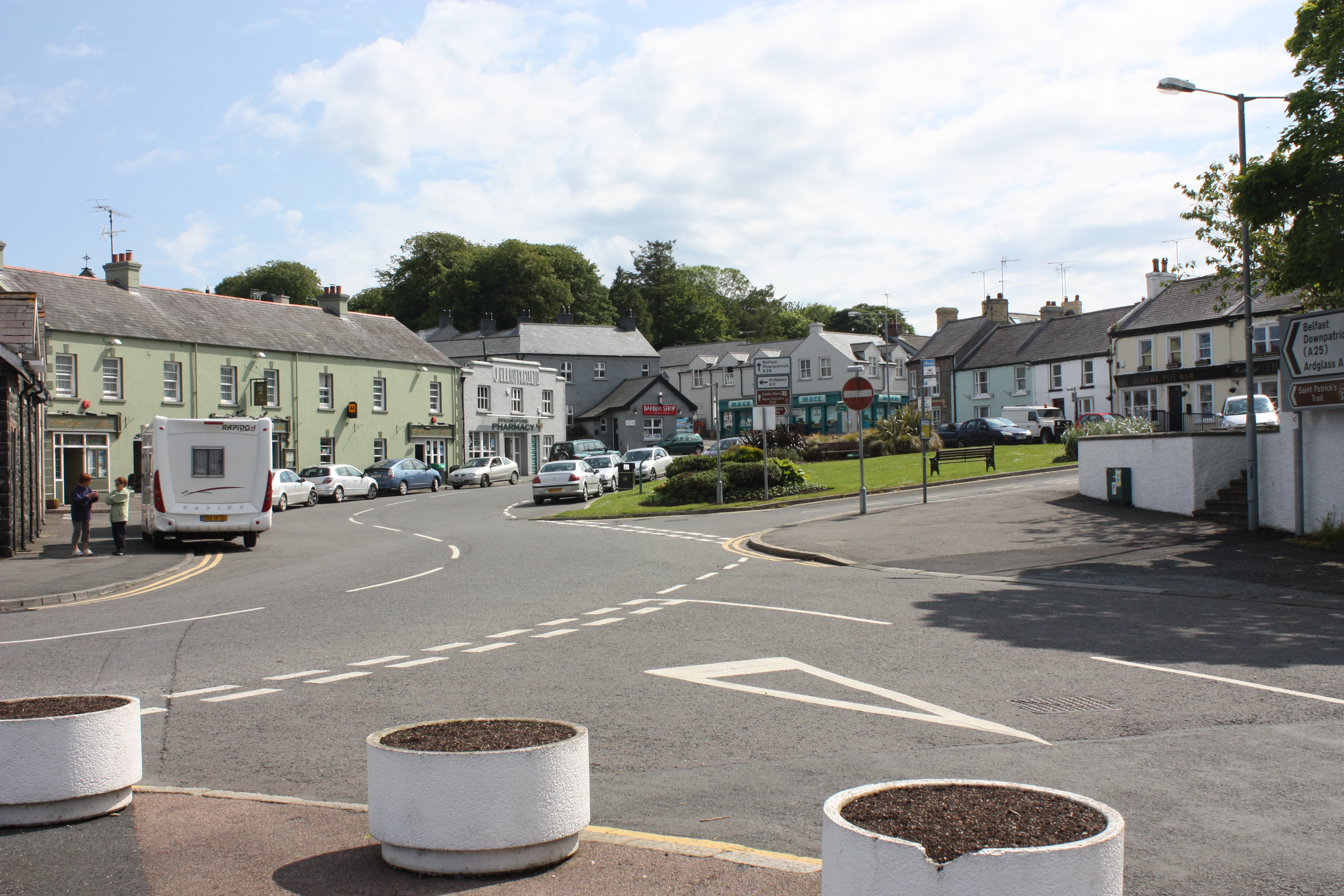

- Location within County Down
- Population: 474 (2001 census)
- Irish grid reference: H8396
- District: Newry, Mourne and Down
- County: County Down
- Country: Northern Ireland
- Sovereign state: United Kingdom
- Post town: DOWNPATRICK
- Postcode district: BT30
- Dialling code: 028
- UK Parliament: Strangford
- NI Assembly: South Down

Strangford (from Old Norse Strangr fjörðr, meaning "strong sea-inlet") is a small village at the mouth of Strangford Lough, on the Lecale peninsula in County Down, Northern Ireland. It had a population of 475 at the 2001 census.

On the other side of the lough is Portaferry on the Ards Peninsula, and there is a ferry service between the two villages. The village has a small harbour, which is overlooked by rows of 19th-century cottages and a fine Georgian terrace.

== History ==
In 432, St Patrick is said to have sailed through the Strangford Narrows and up the Quoile Estuary, bringing Christianity with him. By the mid 6th century many monastic centres had been founded near Strangford and Strangford Lough including; Nendrum, Downpatrick, Comber and Kilclief.

The Norse Vikings had been raiding villages, islands and monasteries in the British Isles since the late 8th century and founded many settlements. The first viking raid in Ireland was the burning of a monastery in 795 on Rathlin Island. The vikings had been regular visitors of Strangford Lough between the 9th and 11th centuries due to the attraction of riches found in monasteries and there is evidence that they not only raided monasteries such as Nendrum monastic site but also traded and settled nearby. The vikings named Strangford Strangr fjörðr, meaning strong fjord or sea inlet. Previously Strangford Lough had been named Loch Cuan which means the quiet lough.

== Places of interest ==
- Strangford Castle, near the harbour in Strangford, is a 16th-century tower house with a drop hole at roof level to defend the door.
- Castle Ward consists of a 16th-century tower house and an 18th-century mansion built in two distinct architectural styles, Classical and Gothic, overlooking Strangford Lough. The property is owned by the National Trust. Castle Ward is one-and-one-half miles from Strangford.
- Audley's Castle is a 15th-century castle one mile northeast of Strangford, overlooking Strangford Lough.
- Audleystown Court Tomb is a Neolithic dual court tomb almost two miles northwest of Strangford.

== Gallery ==
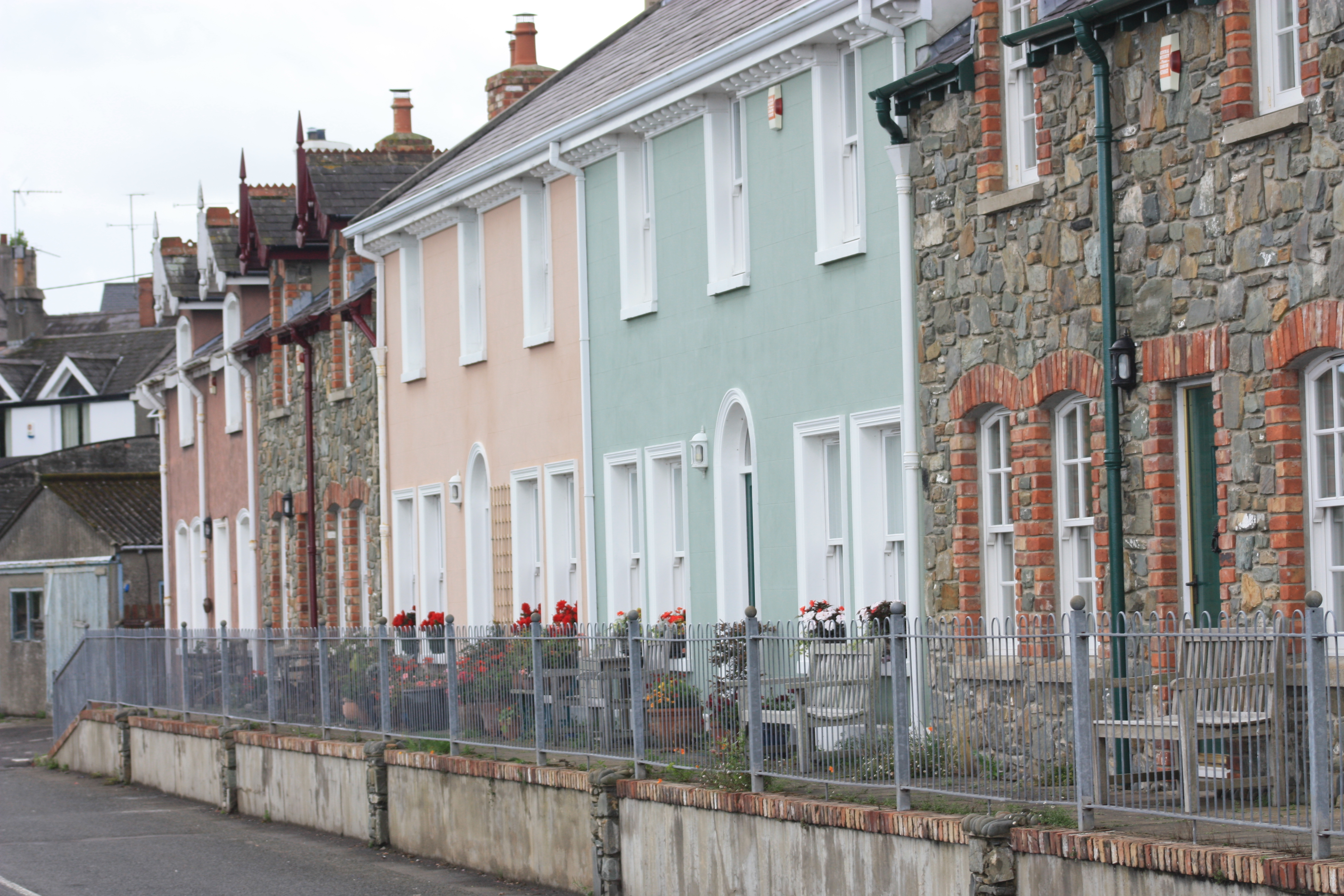
Houses in Strangford, August 2009

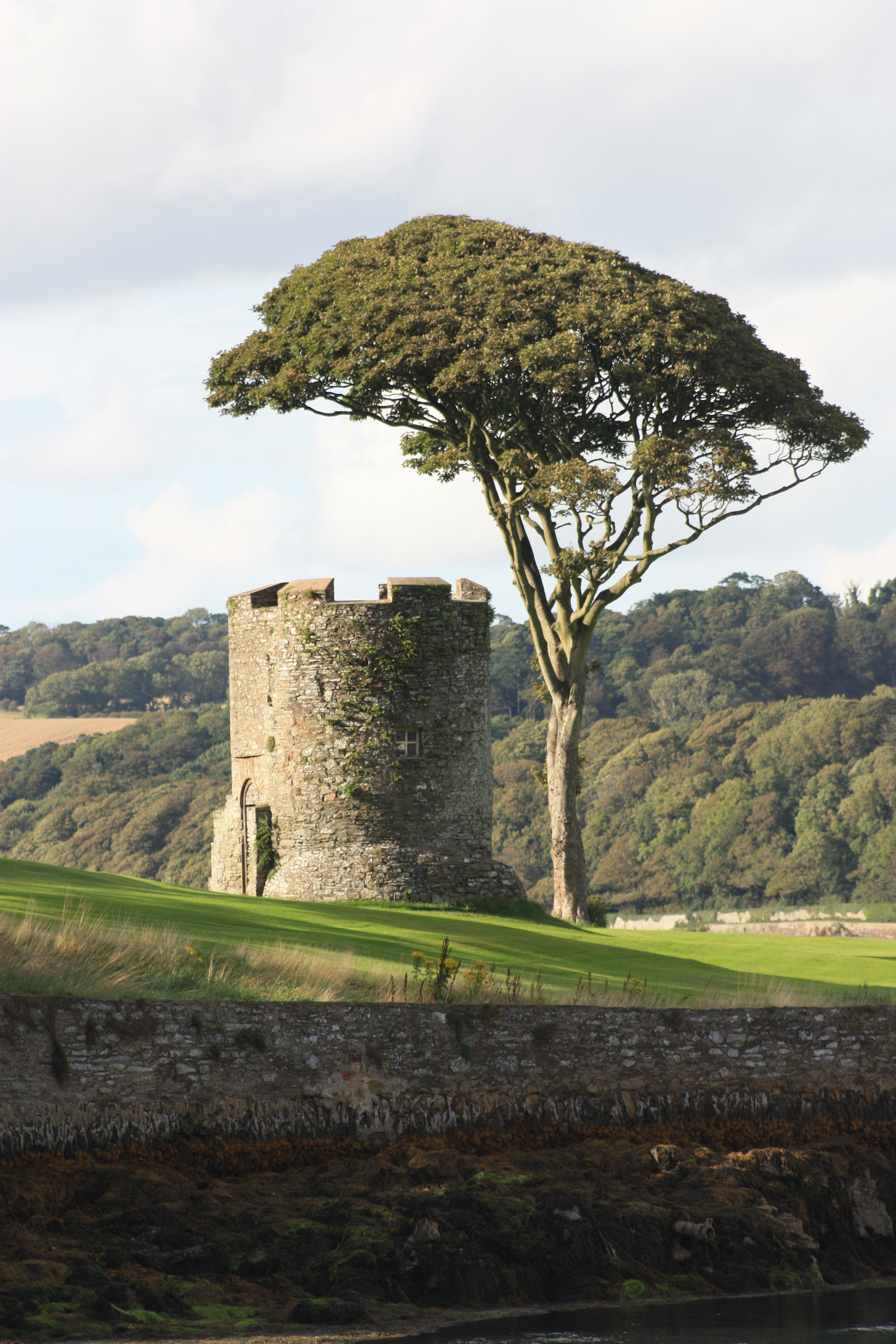
Strangford, August 2009

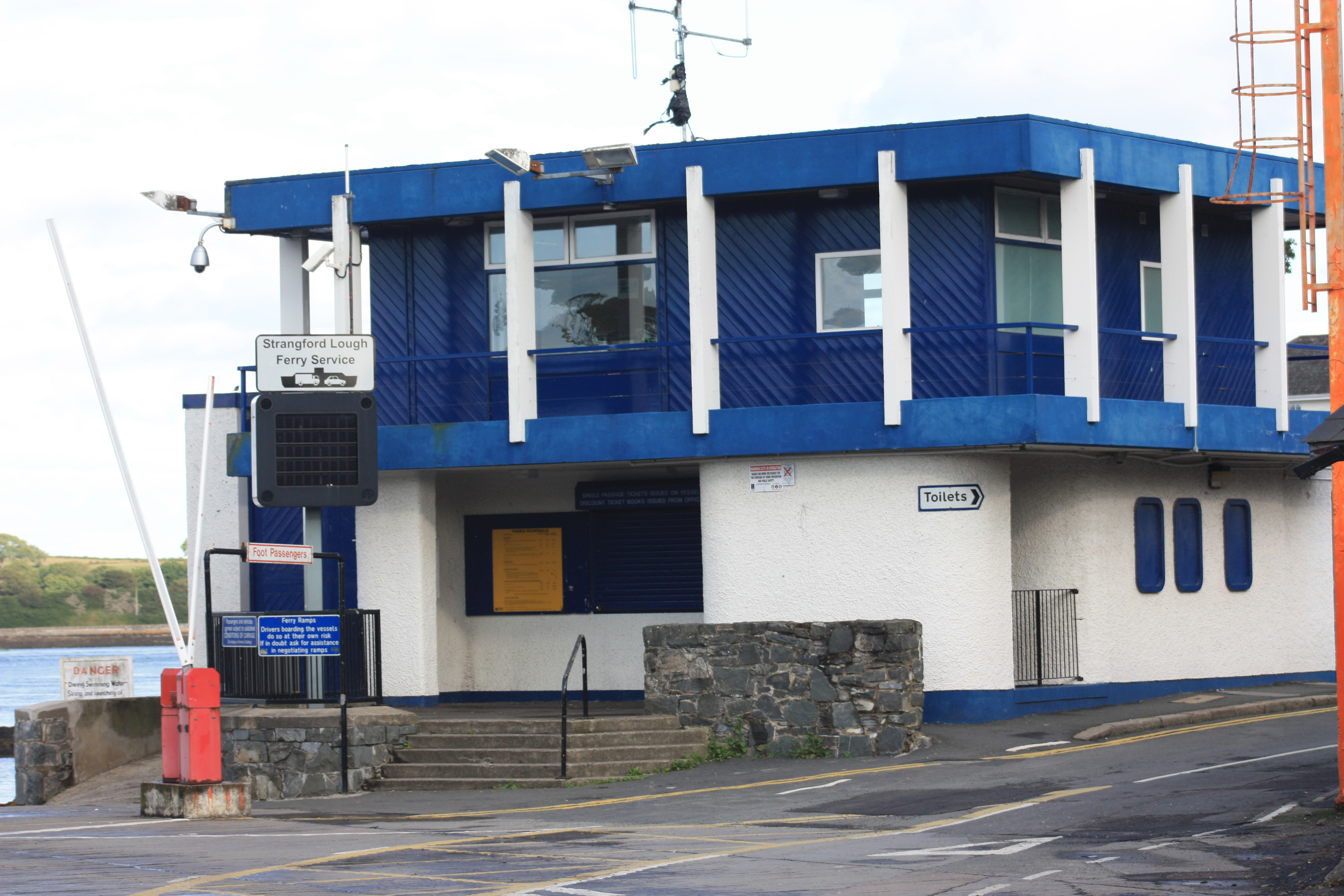
Strangford Ferry terminal, August 2009

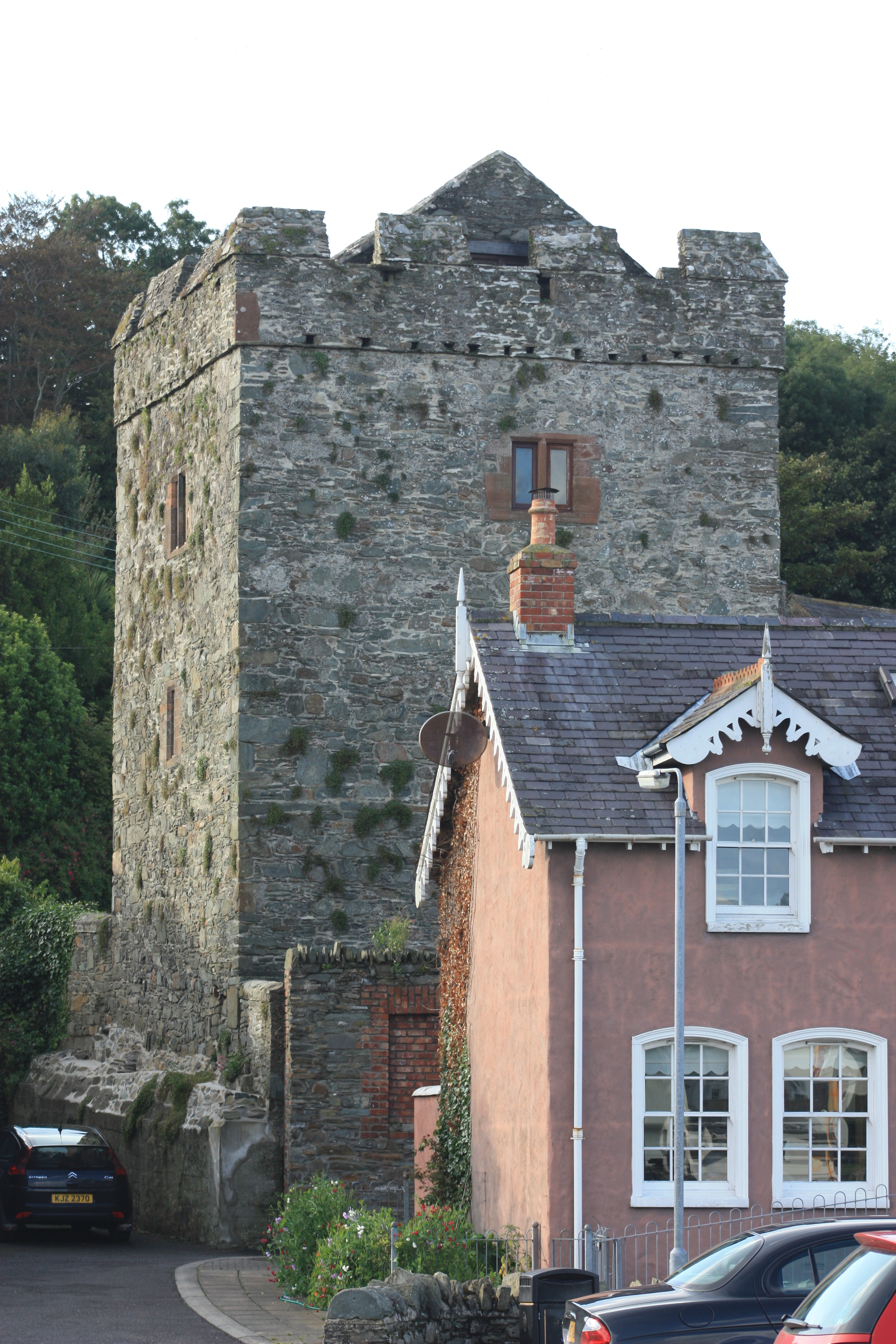
Strangford Castle, August 2009

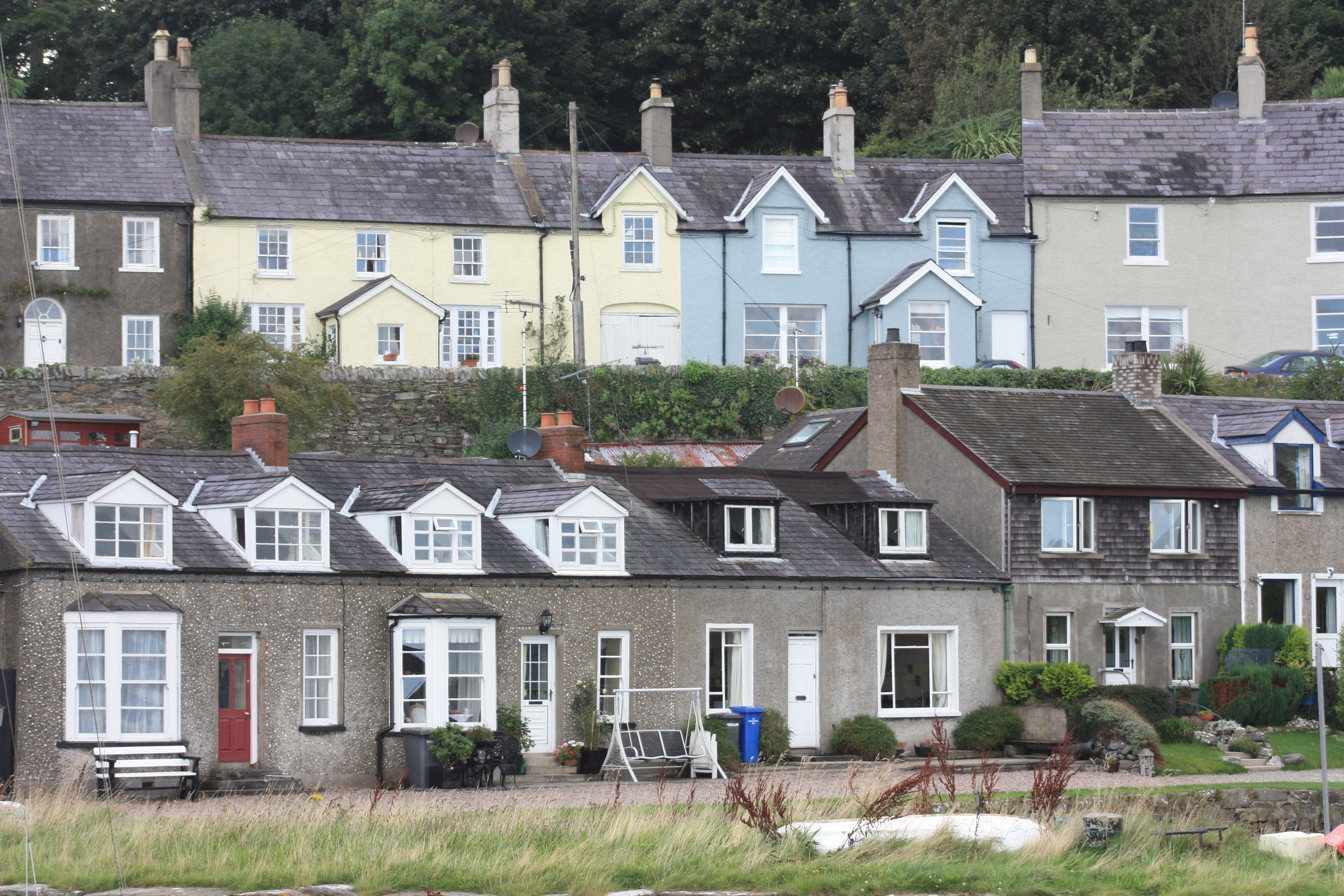
Houses in Strangford, August 2009

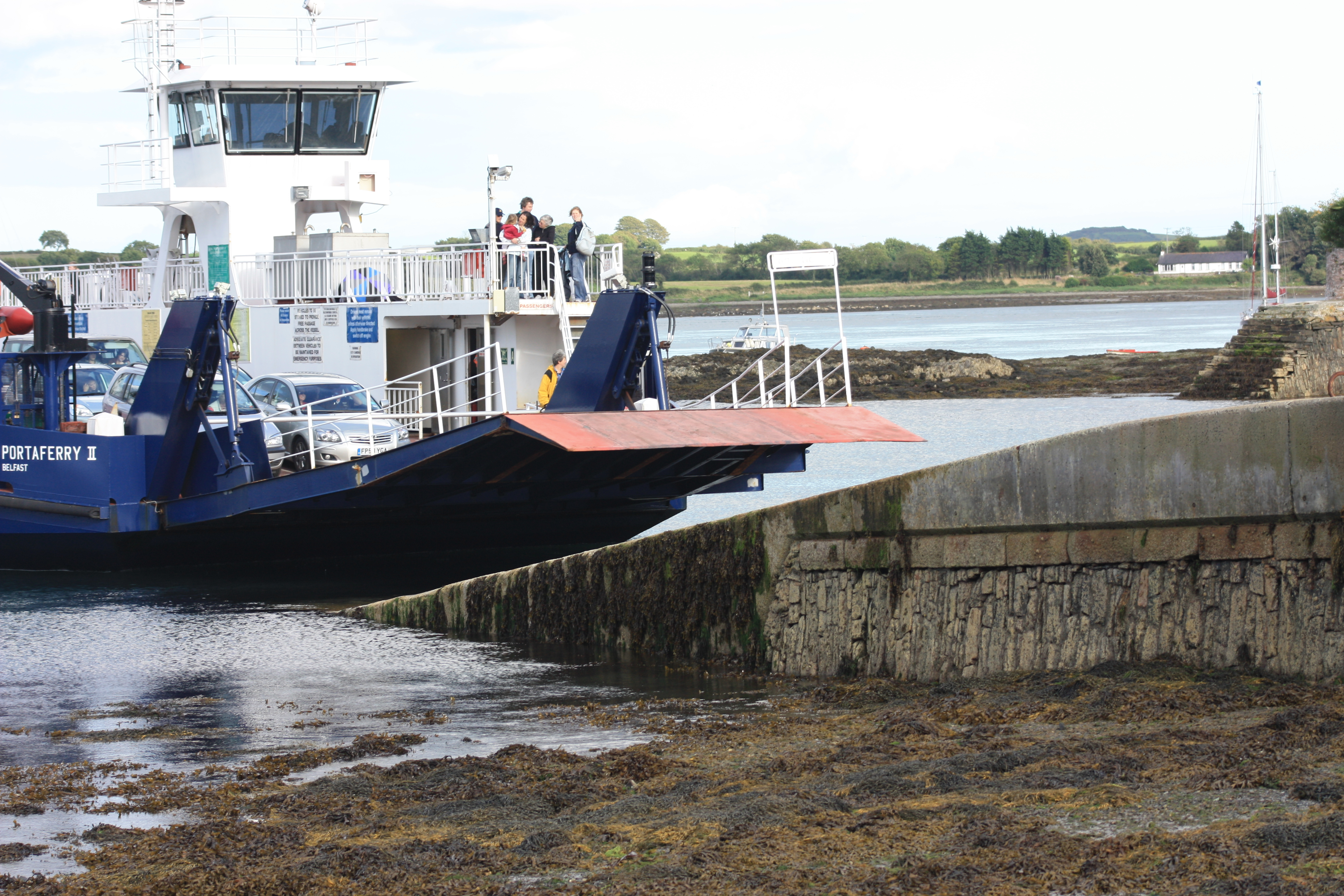
Strangford Ferry approaching Strangford slipway, August 2009
