= Strangford Lough =

Large sea inlet in Northern Ireland

Coordinates: 54.483°N 5.583°W

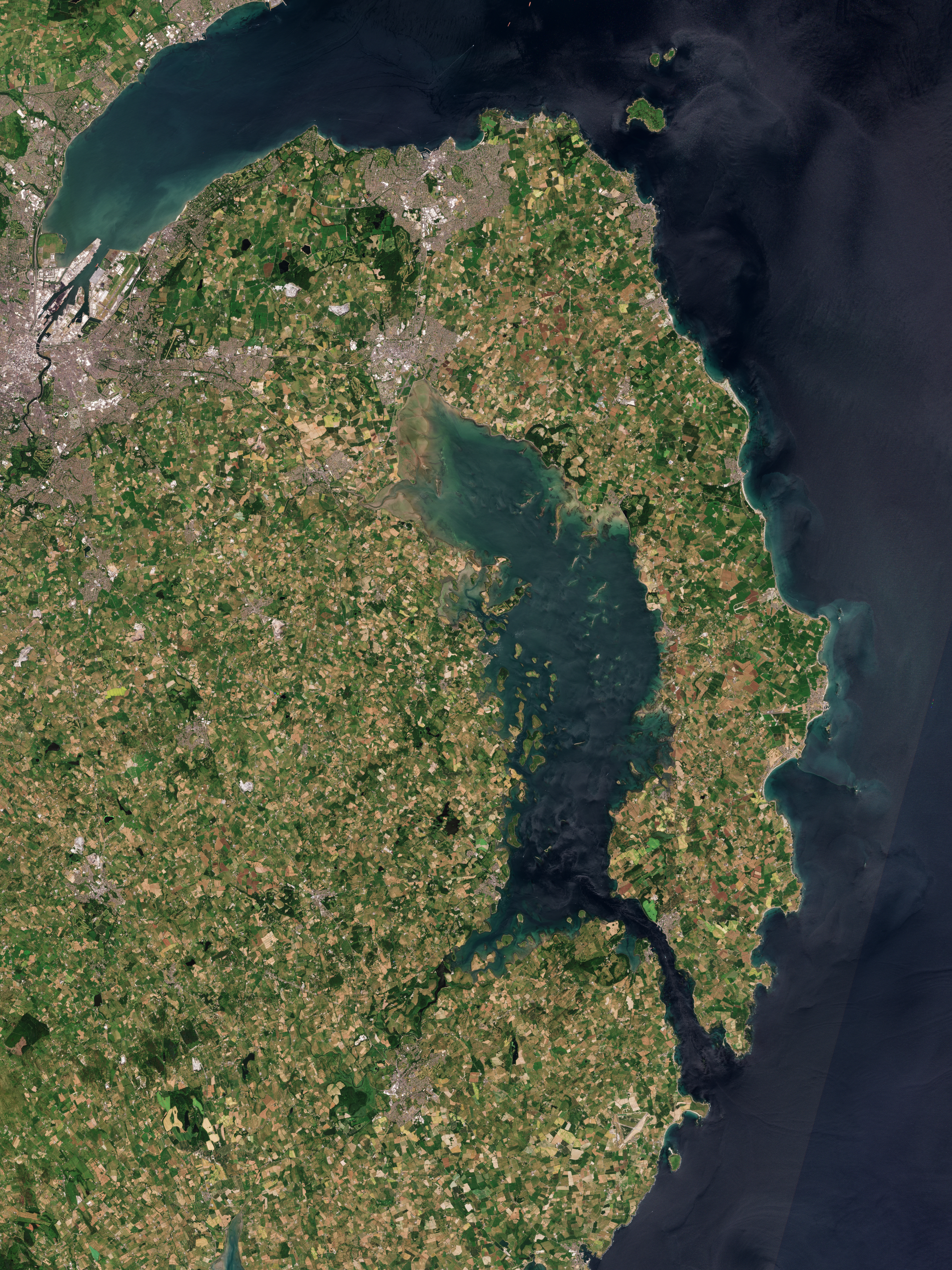
Satellite view of Strangford Lough

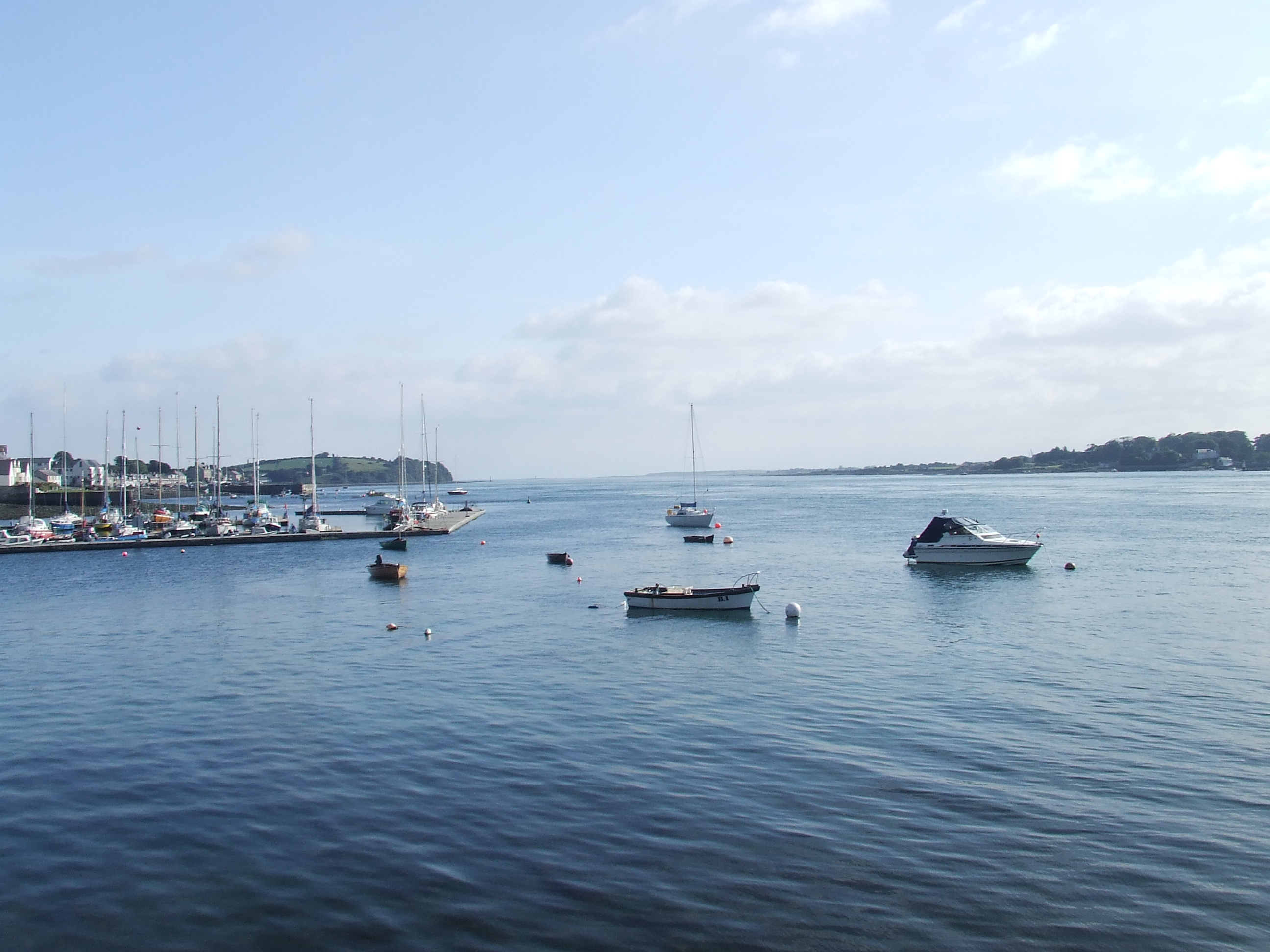
Strangford Lough from Portaferry, looking towards the narrows.

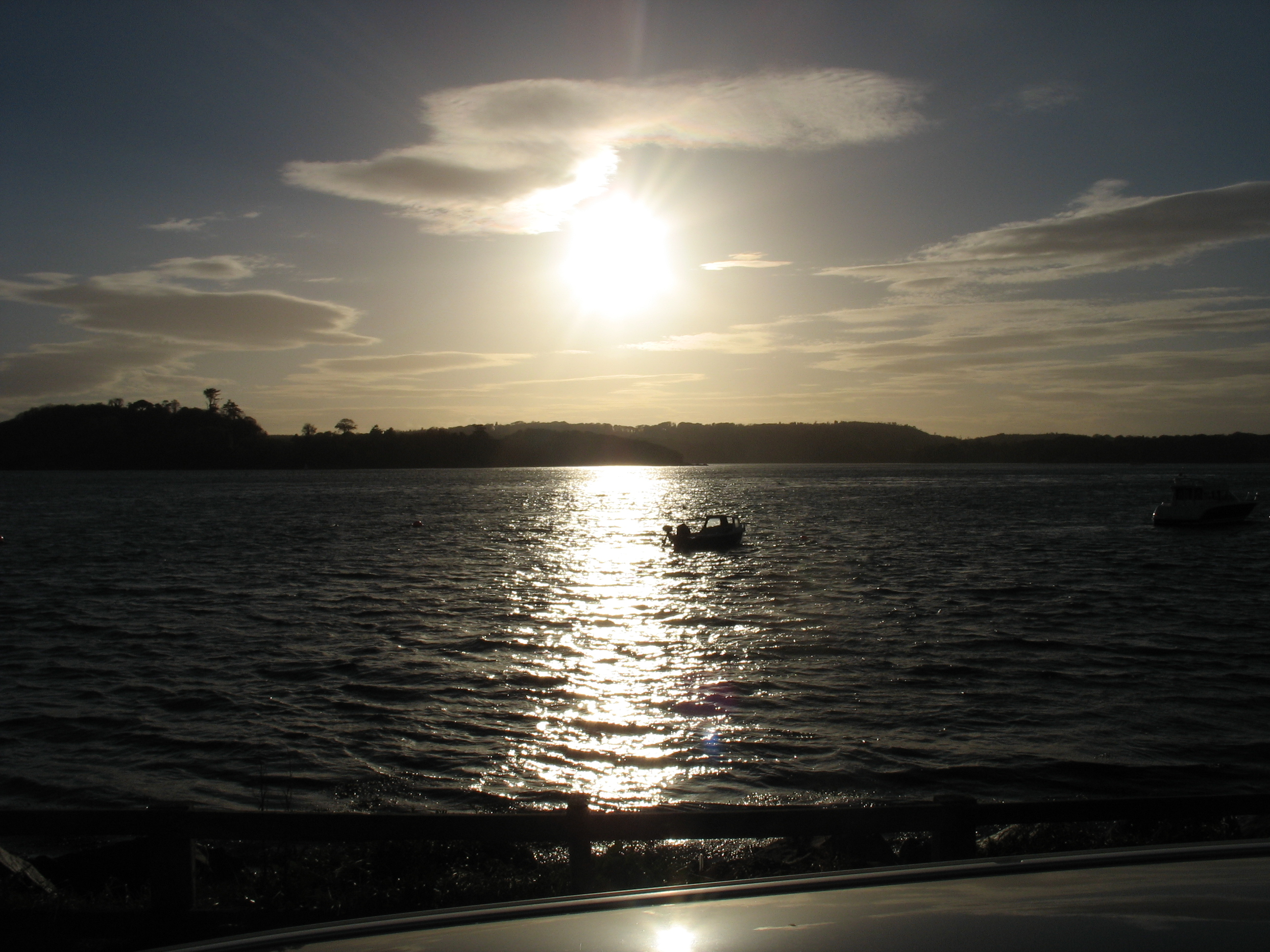
Strangford Lough from Portaferry.

Strangford Lough is a large sea lough or inlet in County Down, in the east of Northern Ireland. It is the largest inlet in Ireland and the wider British Isles, covering 150 km^{2} (58 sq mi). The lough is almost fully enclosed by the Ards Peninsula and is linked to the Irish Sea by a long narrow channel at its southeastern edge. The main body of the lough has at least seventy islands along with many islets (pladdies), bays, coves, headlands and mudflats. It is part of the Strangford and Lecale Area of Outstanding Natural Beauty. Strangford Lough was designated as Northern Ireland's first Marine Conservation Zone in 2013, and has been designated a Special Area of Conservation for its important wildlife.

Strangford Lough is a popular tourist destination noted for its fishing and scenery. Towns and villages around the lough include Killyleagh, Comber, Newtownards, Portaferry and Strangford. The latter two straddle either shore of the narrow Strangford channel, and are connected by a car ferry.

== Name ==
The name Strangford comes from the Old Norse Strangfjörthr, meaning 'strong fjord' or rather 'fjord of the strong current'. Originally it referred to the channel linking the lough to the sea, between the villages of Strangford and Portaferry, but it was extended to the lough as a whole from the 17th century onwards. The lough had previously been known as Lough Cone or Lough Coyne in English, from the Irish Loch Cuan ('lough of the harbours').

== Geology ==
The lough was formed at the end of the last ice age and is generally under 10 metres (30 ft) deep, but can reach 50 to 60 metres (160 to 200 ft) in parts, generally the centre channel.

== Flora ==
=== Flowering plants ===
Common cord-grass (Spartina anglica) C.E. Hubbard, introduced in the mid-1940s, is now abundant.

=== Algae ===
Maerl is a calcareous deposit, in the main, of two species, of calcareous algae Phymatolithon calcareum and Lithothamnion glaciale which form free-living beds of unattached, branched corallines, living or dead, in Strangford Lough.

The rocky and boulder shores toward the south of the lough are dominated by the seaweed knotted wrack Ascophyllum nodosum. The usual zonation of weeds on these shore is, at the top channel wrack (Pelvetia canaliculata (L.) Dcne. et Rhur.), followed by spiral wrack (Fucus spiralis L.), then knotted wrack (Ascophyllum nodosum (L.) Le Jol) with some admixture of bladder wrack (Fucus vesiculosus) L. and then serrated wrack (Fucus serratus L.) before coming to the low water kelps.

Other algae include:

- Apoglossum rusciofolium (Turn.) J. Ag.
- Spyridia filamentosa (Wulf.) Harv.
- Sphondylothamnion multifium (Huds.) Näg.
- Griffithsia corallinoides (L.) Batt.
- Compsothamnion gracillimum de Toni
- Compsothamnion thuyoides (Sm.) Schmitz
- Calliothamnion corymbosum (Sm.) Lyngb
- Rhodymenia delicatula P.Dang.
- Haemescharia hennedyi (Harv.) Vinogradova
- Rhodophyllis divaricate (Stackh.) Papenf.
- Calliblepharis jubata (Good. et Woodw.) Kütz.
- Calliblepharis ciliata (Huds.) Kütz
- Peyssonnelia dubyi P. et H. Crouan
- Plagiospora gracilis Kuck
- Gloiosiphonia capillaris (Huds.) Carm.
- Dudresnaya verticillata (With.) Le Jol.
- Scinaia pseudocrispa (Clem.)
- Cremades/S. turgida Chemin
- Porphyropsis coccinea (J.Ag. ex Aresch) Rosenv.
- Pelvetia canaliculata (L.) Dcne. et Thur.
- Fucus vesiculosus var. volubilis Turn.
- Fucus cottonii Wynne et Magne
- Colpomenia peregrine (Sauv.) Hame
- Asperococcus compressus Griff. ex Hook.
- Striaria attenuate (Grev.) Grev.
- Myriotrichia clavaeformis Harv.
- Tilopteris mertensii (Turn.) Kütz.
- Chordaria flagelliformis (O.F.Müll.) C.Ag.
- Spermatochnus paradoxus (Roth) Kütz.
- Pseudolithoderma extensum (P. et H. Crouan) Lund.
- Enteromorpha ralfsii Harv.
- Chlorochytrium sp.

== Fauna ==
Strangford Lough and Islands is an Important Bird Area. Strangford Lough is an important winter migration destination for many wading and sea birds. Animals commonly found in the lough include common seals, basking sharks and brent geese. Three quarters of the world population of pale bellied brent geese spend winter in the lough area. Often the numbers are up to 15,000. The Castle Espie wetland reserve sits on the banks of the lough near Comber.

The invasive carpet sea squirt, Didemnum vexillum, was found in the Lough in 2012.

== Tidal electricity ==
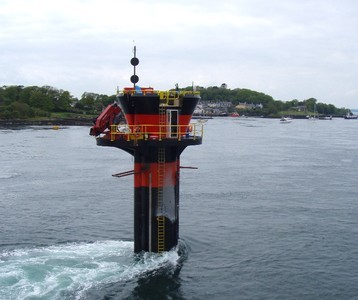
SeaGen.

In 2007 Strangford Lough became home to the world's first commercial tidal stream power station, SeaGen. The 1.2 megawatt underwater tidal electricity generator, part of Northern Ireland's Environment and Renewable Energy Fund scheme, took advantage of the fast tidal flow in the lough which can be up to 4 m/s. Although the generator was powerful enough to power up to a thousand homes, the turbine had a minimal environmental impact, as it was almost entirely submerged, and the rotors turned slowly enough that they pose no danger to wildlife.

In 2008 a tidal energy device called Evopod was tested in Strangford Lough near the Portaferry Ferry landing. The device was a 1/10 scale prototype, monitored by Queen's University Belfast. The device was a semi-submerged floating tidal turbine, moored to the seabed via a buoy-mounted swivel. The scale device was not grid connected.

== Sports ==
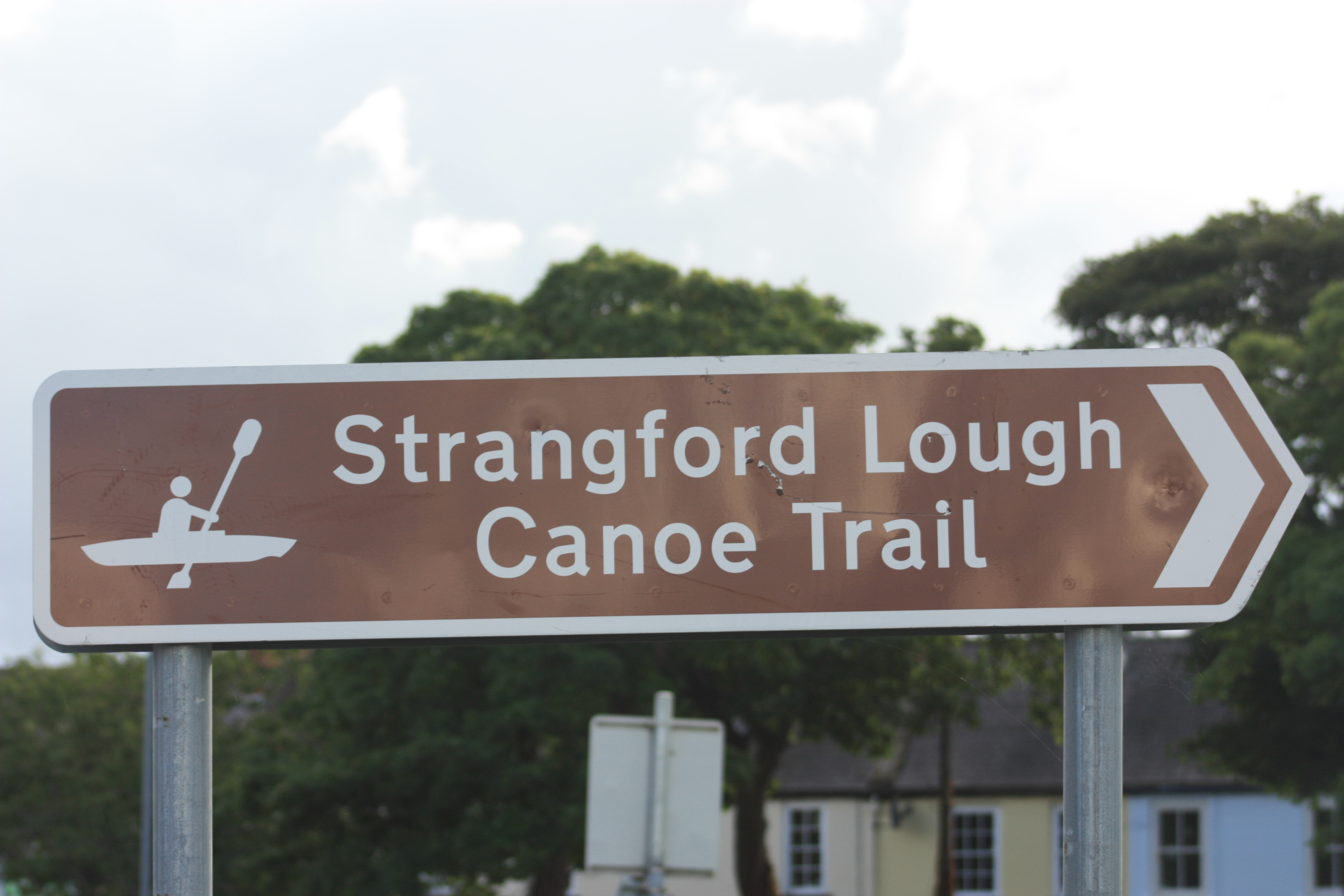
Strangford Lough Canoe Trail

In July 2016, the Strangford Lough and Lecale Partnership, Scottish Coastal Rowing Association, Newry, Mourne and Down District Council and Ards and North Down Borough Council hosted the "Skiffie Worlds 2016" rowing championships. The event was attended by 50 clubs from Scotland, England, Northern Ireland, the Netherlands, The United States, Canada and Tasmania. Racing was held over a 2 km course on Strangford Lough at Delamont Country Park.

== Ferry ==
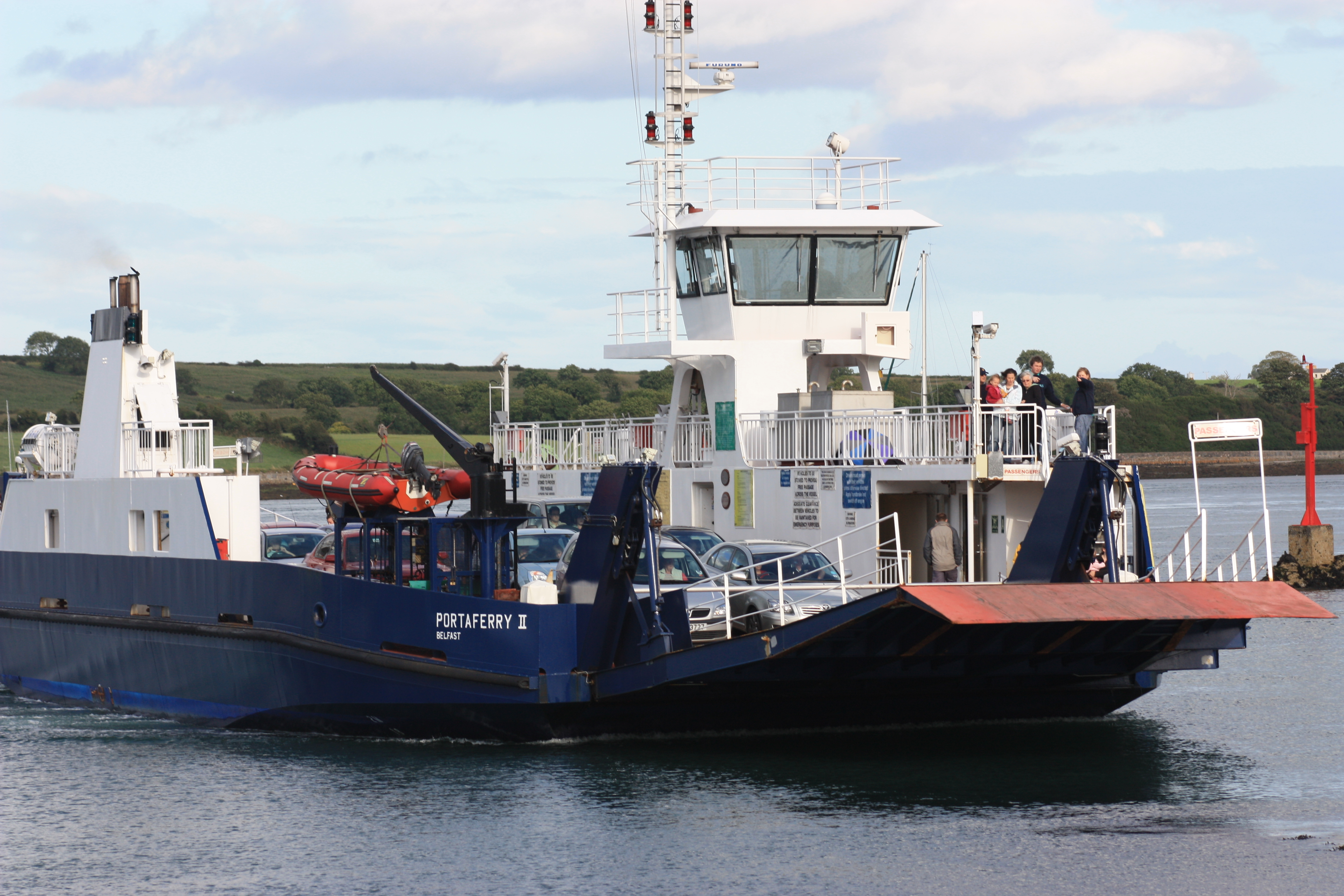
The Portaferry–Strangford ferry

The Portaferry–Strangford ferry service has linked Portaferry and Strangford, at the mouth of the Lough, without a break and for almost four centuries. The alternative road journey is 47 miles (76 km) and takes about an hour and a half, while the ferry crosses the 0.6-nautical-mile (0.69 mi; 1.1 km) strait in 8 minutes. The subsidised public service carries both passengers and vehicles, and operates at a loss of more than £1m per year but is viewed as an important transport link to the Ards Peninsula.

== See also ==
- List of loughs in Ireland
- Nendrum Monastery
