= DfI Roads =

Highway authority in Northern Ireland

Department for Infrastructure Roads or DfI Roads (formerly Transport NI, and the Roads Service) is the public body responsible for the upkeep and maintenance of highways and roads in Northern Ireland in the United Kingdom. It is an executive agency of the Department for Infrastructure.

As of June 2022, there are 17 section offices across Northern Ireland.

DfI Roads was part of the Department of the Environment but was transferred to the then Department for Regional Development (DRD) upon the latter's creation in 1998. In 2016, DfI became the authority responsible for road management.
