= Denis Rankin Round =

Long distance hill running in Down, Ireland

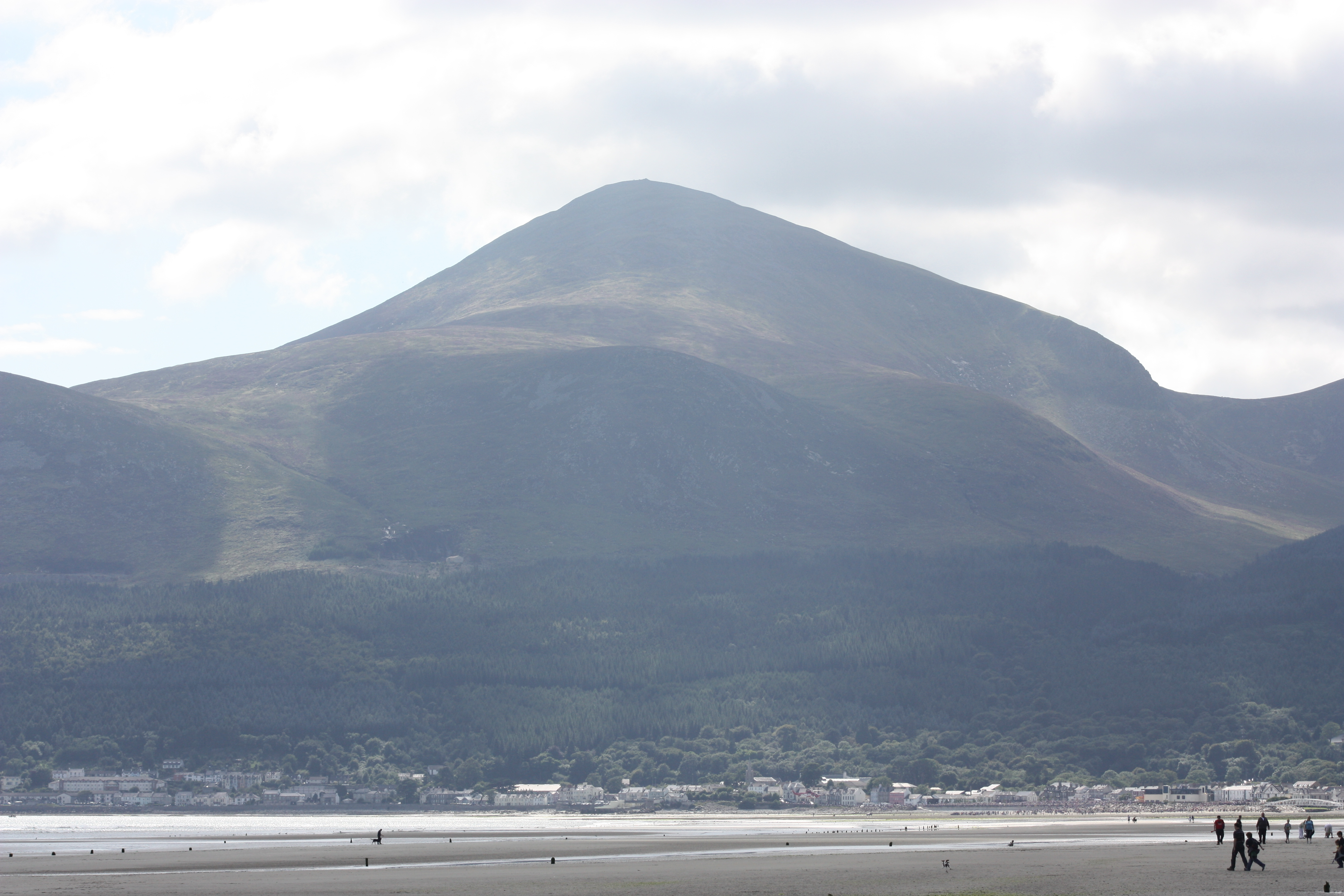
Slieve Donard, Northern Ireland's highest mountain

The Denis Rankin Round is a long distance hill running challenge around the Mourne Mountains in County Down, Northern Ireland. The route is a circuit of over 90 kilometres, with a total climb of over 6,500 metres. The Round must be completed within 24 hours to be considered a success.

The record times are 13:20 by Shane Lynch and 19:12 by Aoife Mundow.

== The route ==
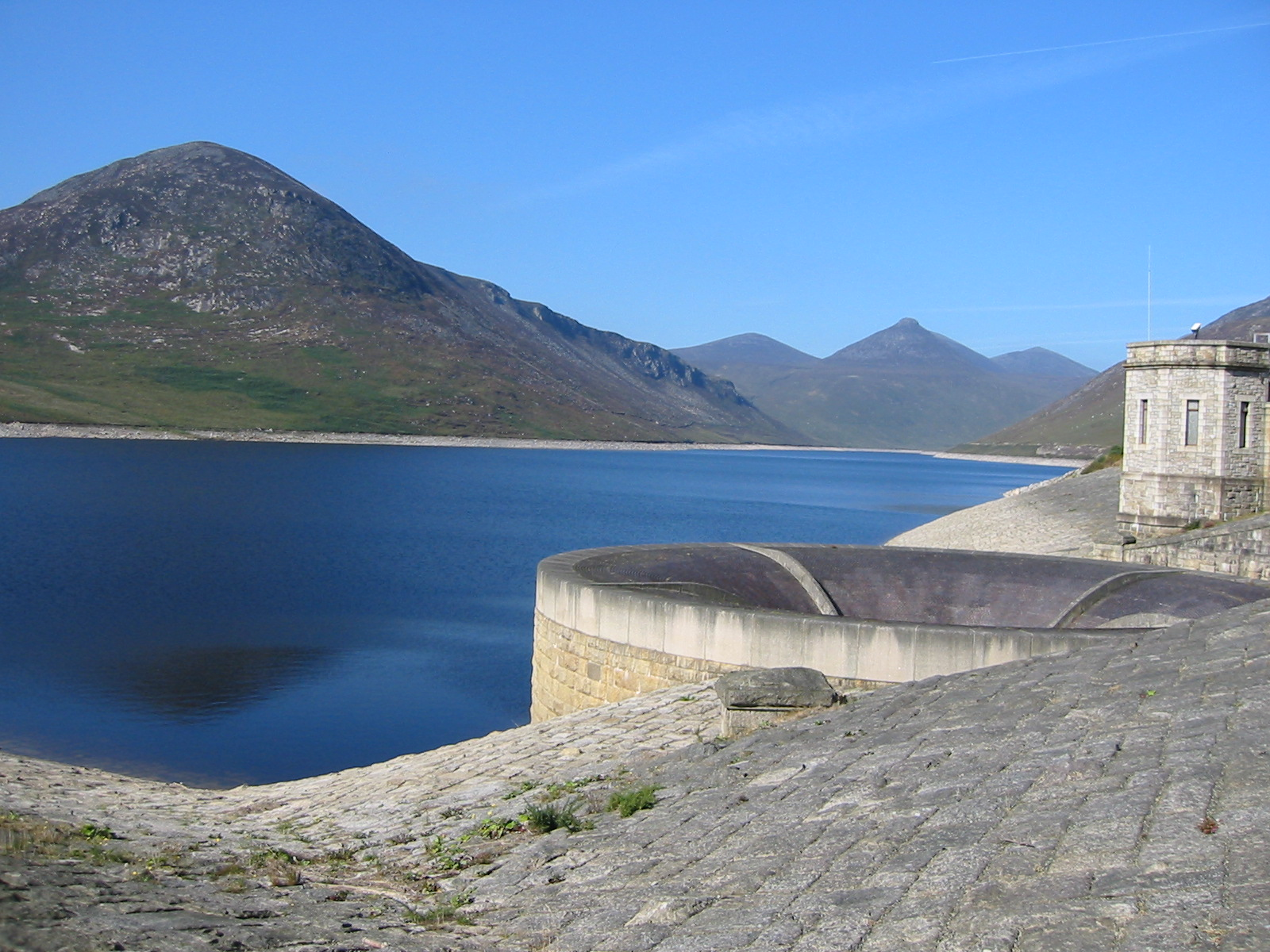
Silent Valley Reservoir

Much of the route runs through the Mourne Mountains Area of Outstanding Natural Beauty; the highest summit in both Ulster and Northern Ireland (Slieve Donard) is included. The Round must be completed either in the order below, or in the reverse order.

Summit Sequence	Location
Start and Finish Line	Donard car park
1	Slieve Donard
2	Chimney Rock Mountain
3	Rocky Mountain (Annalong valley)
4	Slieve Beg
5	Cove Mountain
6	Slievelamagan
7	Binnian North tor
8	Slieve Binnian
9	Wee Binnian
	Silent Valley
10	Slievenaglogh
11	Doan
12	Ben Crom
13	Carn Mountain
14	Slieve Muck
	Stile, Deer's Meadow
15	Pigeon Rock North Top
16	Slievemoughanmore
17	Wee Slievemoughan
18	Eagle Mountain
19	Shanlieve
20	Finlieve
21	Slievemeen
22	Slievemartin
23	Crenville
24	Slievemeel
25	Tievedockaragh
26	Pierce's Castle
27	Rocky Mountain (Leitrim Lodge)
28	Cock Mountain, NE Top
29	Slievenamiskan
	Spelga Car park
30	Spaltha
31	Slievenamuck
32	Ott Mountain
33	Slieve Loughshannagh
34	Slieve Meelbeg
35	Slieve Meelmore
36	Slieve Bearnagh
37	Slievenaglogh
38	Slieve Corragh
39	Slieve Commedagh
Start and Finish Line	Donard car park

== See also ==
- Wicklow Round
