= Mourne Wall =

Wall by Silent Valley Reservoir, Northern Ireland

Coordinates: 54.139°N 6.003°W

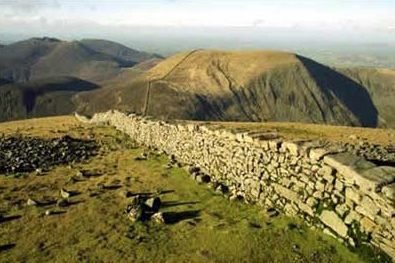
Mourne wall on the slopes of Slieve Donard, the highest mountain in Northern Ireland

The Mourne Wall was constructed to enclose a catchment area of the Silent Valley Reservoir in the Mourne Mountains, Northern Ireland. The 1.5 m (4 ft 11 in) high stone wall, which was built to keep livestock from contaminating water supplies, took almost twenty years to complete (1904 to 1922). The project was overseen by the Belfast City and District Water Commissioners.

== History ==
=== Planning ===
Luke Livingston Macassey (1843–1908), an Irish civil engineer and barrister, was in 1874 appointed consultant hydraulic engineer by the Belfast and District Water Commissioners. The Commission had been set up in 1840 to ensure the water supply for Belfast, at that time an expanding city. In 1891 Macassey advised the construction of a reservoir in the Mourne Mountains, as a long-term solution.

The project required the acquisition of wayleaves and water rights. Private Acts of Parliament were passed, of 1893, 1897 and 1899, on behalf of the Commissioners.

The Silent Valley Reservoir was built between 1923 and 1933 to hold the water from the catchment area enclosed by the wall. The reservoir supplies Belfast via the Mourne Conduit/Aquarius pipeline. The main purpose of the Mourne Wall was to isolate the catchment area from cattle and sheep.

=== Construction ===
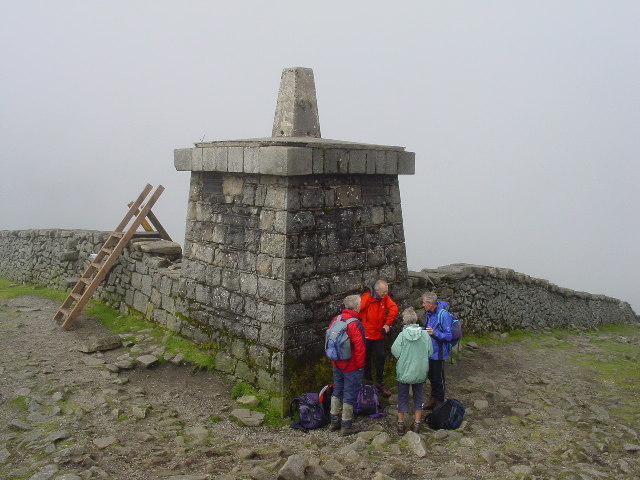
The Mourne Wall at the summit of Slieve Donard, where a trig point stands upon the summit tower

The wall was built from natural granite stone using traditional dry stone walling techniques. On average the wall is about 1.5 m (4 ft 11 in) high and 0.8 to 0.9 m (2 ft 7 in to 2 ft 11 in) thick and is estimated to be 19.5 mi (31.4 km) long. Stonemasons worked from March to mid-October for 18 years to build the wall.

=== Topography ===
As the wall was built to contain the catchment area of the Mourne, the wall passes over fifteen of the highest mountains in the area (listed clockwise from the Kilkeel River):

- Slievenaglogh 445 m (1,460 ft)
- Slieve Muck 674 m (2,211 ft)
- Carn Mountain 587 m (1,926 ft)
- Slieve Loughshannagh 619 m (2,031 ft)
- Slieve Meelbeg 708 m (2,323 ft)
- Slieve Meelmore 680 m (2,230 ft)
- Slieve Bearnagh 739 m (2,425 ft)
- Slievenaglogh 586 m (1,923 ft)
- Slieve Corragh 641 m (2,103 ft)
- Slieve Commedagh 765 m (2,510 ft)
- Slieve Donard 850 m (2,790 ft)
- Rocky Mountain 525 m (1,722 ft)
- Slieve Binnian 747 m (2,451 ft)
- Wee Binnian 460 m (1,510 ft)
- Moolieve 332 m (1,089 ft)

=== Management ===
The wall is maintained and owned by Northern Ireland Water.

== Hiking ==
The Mourne Wall Challenge Walk is a challenging walking route following the historic Mourne Wall over seven of the ten highest mountains in Northern Ireland. In 2013, an event's designated route was recorded by a participant as being 30.51 km (18.96 mi) with a total 2,527 m (8,291 ft) elevation, although the designated route of this event contained two significant diversions from the wall itself in the Silent Valley and Annalong Valley.

Different versions of Mourne Wall challenge routes have been posted on the internet in recent years. The first of these follows the entire length of the wall as a full circuit of the mountain land owned by Northern Ireland Water (including Silent Valley Mountain Park). A second version follows the perimeter of the rainfall catchment area only, cutting across the dam wall of the Silent Valley reservoir. A third version of the route was specified for an organised walking event in 2013. This version also appears in Paddy Dillon's guidebook 'The Mournes Walks'.
