= Ben Crom =

Mountain in Northern Ireland

- Binn Chrom
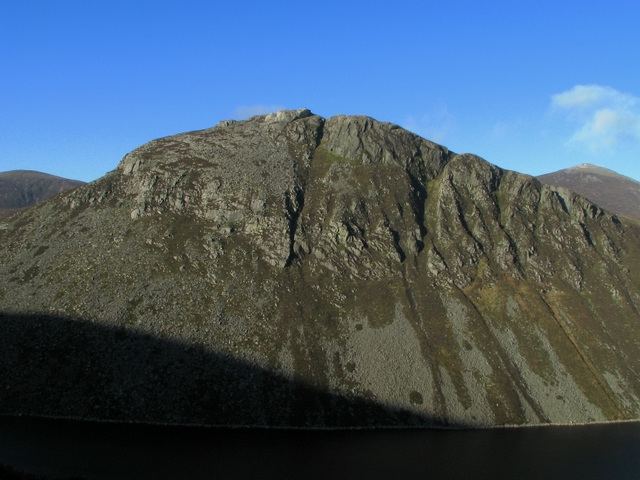
- Ben Crom mountain

Highest point
- Peak: Ben Crom summit, Mourne Mountains, County Down
- Elevation: 526 m (1,726 ft)
- Prominence: 81 m (266 ft)
- Parent peak: Slieve Binnian
- Listing: Myrddyn Dewey
- Coordinates: 54°09′58″N 5°59′26″W

Naming
- Etymology: From Irish Binn Chrom, meaning "curved" or "stooped peak"
- Native name: Binn Chrom (Irish)
- English translation: Curved/stooped peak

Geography
- Location within Northern Ireland
- Location: County Down, Northern Ireland
- Country: United Kingdom
- State: Northern Ireland
- County: County Down
- Parent range: Mourne Mountains
- OSI/OSNI grid: J31300 26000
- Topo map: Ordnance Survey of Northern Ireland OSNI Discoverer 29
- Biome: Upland heath and grassland

Geology
- Formed by: Intrusive igneous activity
- Orogeny: Caledonian
- Rock age: ~60 million years (Paleogene)
- Mountain type: Granite mountain
- Rock type(s): Aplitic granite with dolerite and feldspar porphyry dykes
- Last eruption: Not applicable

Climbing
- First ascent: Unknown
- Easiest route: Hike from Silent Valley or Ott Car Park
- Normal route: Southern approach via Ben Crom Reservoir
- Access: Public access via Mourne Wall paths and upland trails

Ben Crom (from Irish Binn Chrom, meaning 'curved/stooped peak/cliff') is a 526 metres (1,726 ft) mountain in the Mourne Mountains in County Down, Northern Ireland. It is situated beside Ben Crom Reservoir, which is upstream from Silent Valley Reservoir. The mountain is composed of granite. An exposed area on the south west of the mountain shows where the Eocene aplitic granite meets the laccolith top of the older Mesozoic granite ring dike. The summit of the mountain features granite crags which are crossed by basic and feldspar porphyry dikes. The mountain is used for sheep grazing and hill walking.

The eastern slopes of Ben Crom are steep and covered in scree, a result of glacial activity that affected north- and east-facing slopes more intensely. The Ben Crom Reservoir, located nearby, was constructed in 1957 to supplement the Silent Valley Reservoir. Together, these reservoirs supply water to the Greater Belfast area and have a combined capacity of nearly 21 billion litres. The granite used in the construction of the reservoirs was sourced locally. From the Ben Crom dam wall, the valley between Ben Crom and Slievelamagan is visible, with notable contrasts between the steep, craggy eastern slopes and the smoother western slopes.

== Cultural and Historical Context ==
In early Irish tradition, the mountains were referred to as Beanna Boirche ("Boirche's Peaks"), named after a legendary figure, Boirche, who was said to have been granted grazing rights in the area by Ross the Red, a king of Ulster around the 3rd century AD. The name Beanna Boirche persisted in various forms through the centuries, including in Ulster Scots usage as the "Borkey Bens." The only peak in the range still bearing the "Ben" designation is Ben Crom.

Although linguistically, the name Ben Crom is more likely descriptive of the mountain’s shape it is possible that it may be a reference to the old Celtic God of Darkness Crom Cruach. Crom Cruach was a powerful and feared god, historically worshipped in ancient Ireland. He was associated with darkness, fertility, and sacrifice. Worship of Crom Cruach involved offerings, including the firstborn of families, and his cult was eventually suppressed by Saint Patrick during the Christianization of Ireland. While Ben Crom itself is not directly named after Crom Cruach, the phonetic resemblance and the mountain’s dramatic, solitary presence in the Mournes may have inspired mythic or folkloric connections.

== Geology ==
The south-western flank of Ben Crom is a geologically significant site that displays a well-defined contact between two granite types: G2 and G3. The G2 granite is grey-coloured and closely jointed, while the underlying G3 granite is lighter in colour and finer-grained. This contact is exposed along a series of crags above scree slopes and can be traced across the south face of Ben Crom, extending to the eastern cliffs. The mountain lies within the central Mournes, an area geologically defined by the G3 granite phase of the Mourne Granite Pluton. Along walking trails and disused quarries, this granite is visibly intruded by dolerite dykes. These formations date back approximately 60 million years, when tectonic forces during the breakup of North America and Europe caused magma to rise and cool underground, forming the granite uplands seen today. The surrounding landscape, including nearby Slieve Donard, is steeped in Irish mythology, notably the Táin Bó Cúailnge, linking the terrain to the legendary warrior Cú Chulainn.

== Hiking & Outdoor Experience ==
Ben Crom is known for its relatively moderate hiking routes and panoramic views. The mountain can be accessed via several established trails, including the route from Silent Valley Car Park, which is mostly level until the final ascent and typically takes 3 to 4 hours for a round trip. This path offers views of the Silent Valley and the adjacent Ben Crom Reservoir. Another approach begins at Ott Car Park and is more demanding, often combined with ascents of nearby peaks such as Doan Mountain or Slieve Binnian. This route involves rocky terrain and light scrambling near the summit and generally requires 4 to 5 hours to complete. Ben Crom is less frequented than other Mourne peaks like Slieve Donard or Slieve Bearnagh, making it suitable for hikers seeking quieter trails.

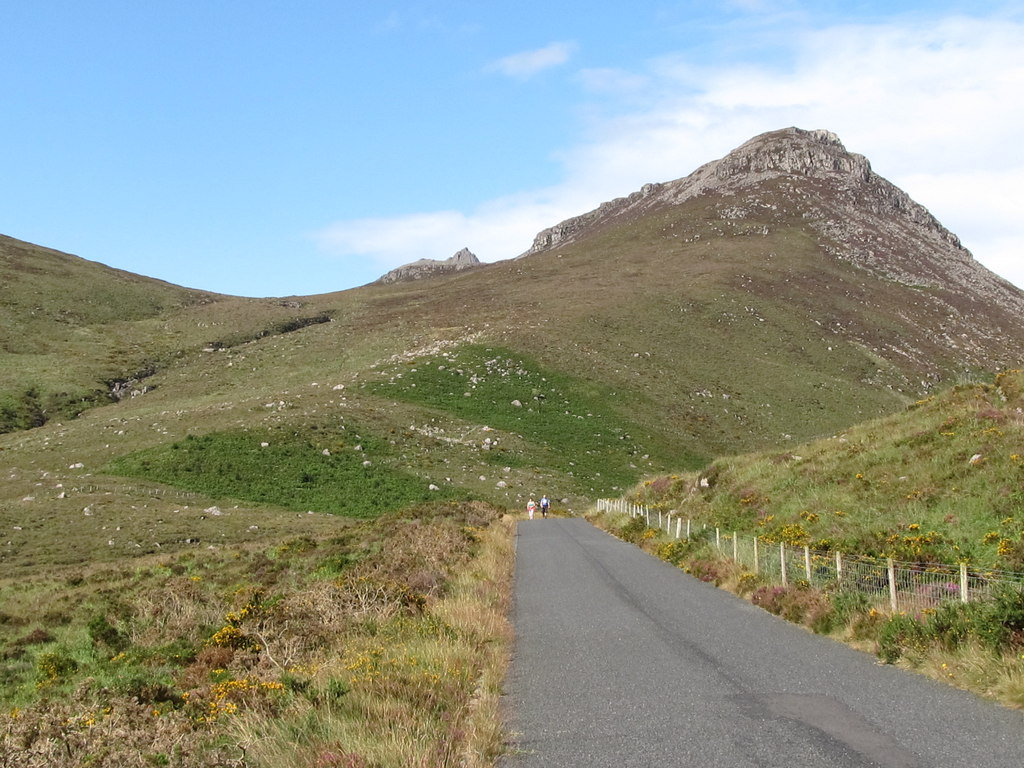
Ben Crom Mountain from the Dam Service Road

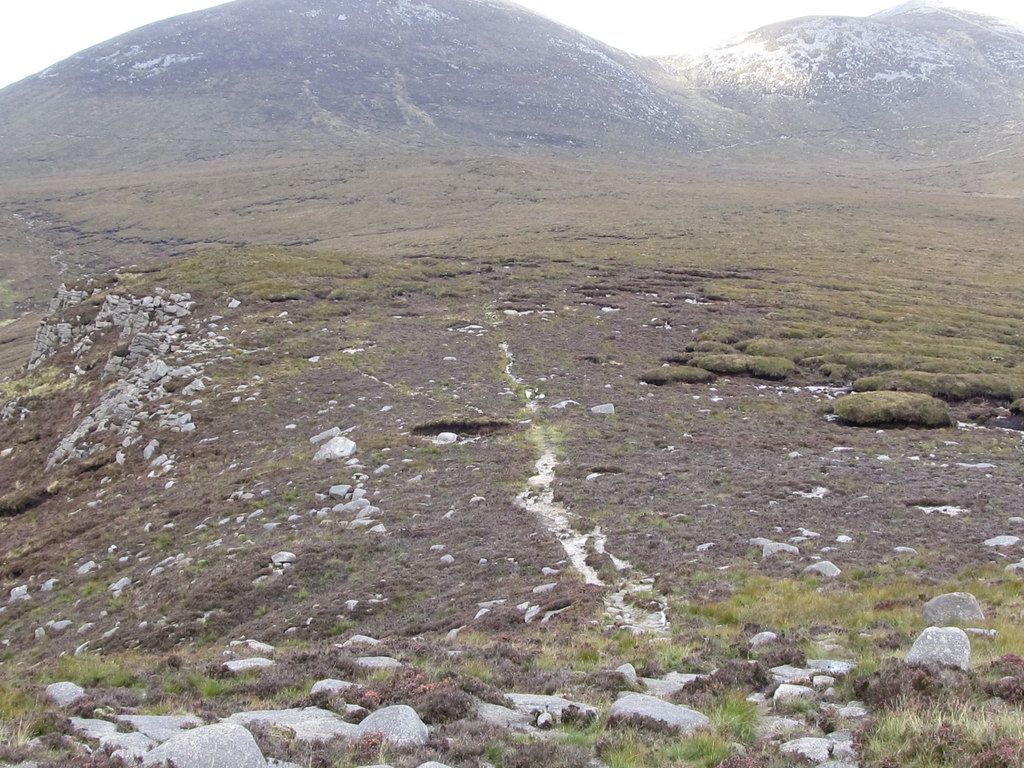
Path leading towards the summit of Ben Crom

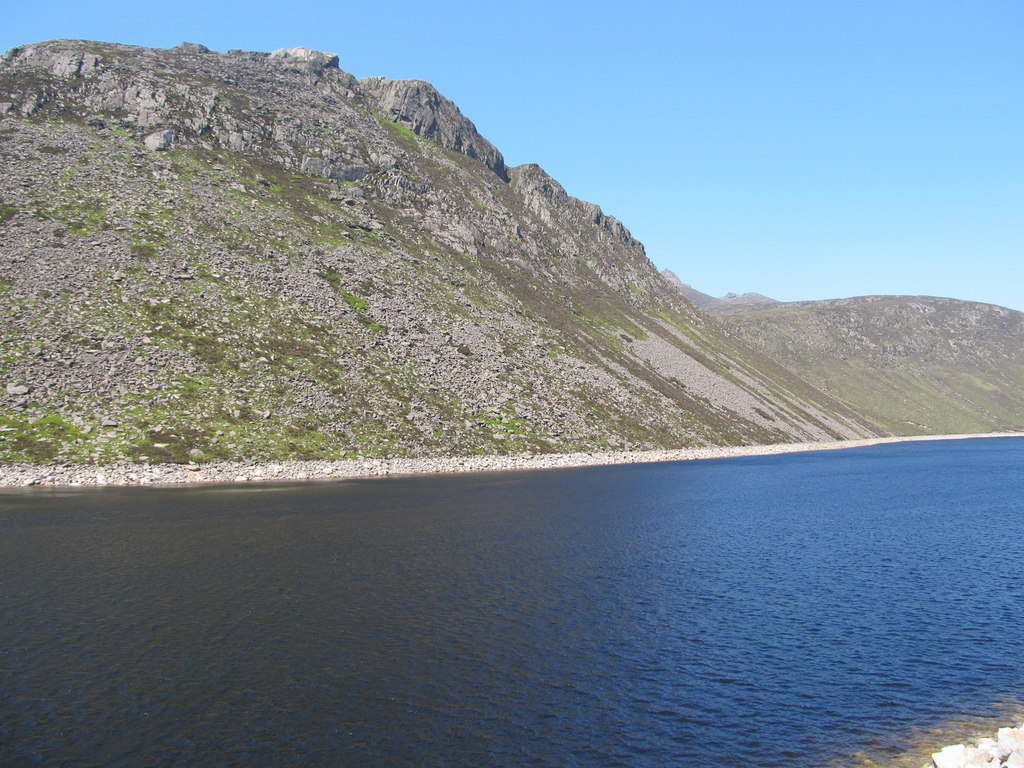
Ben Crom mountain viewed across Ben Crom Reservoir

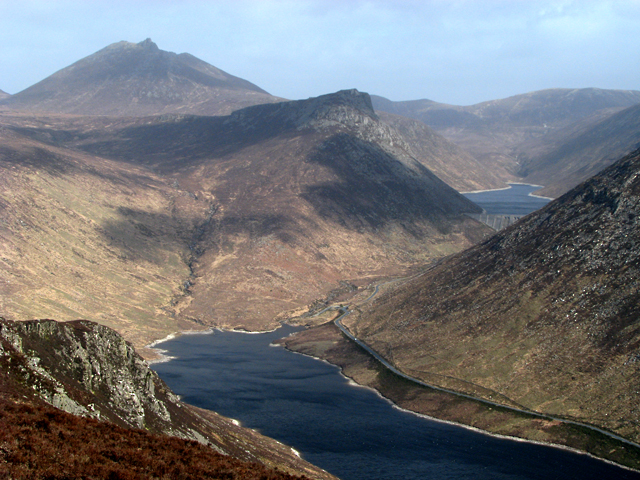
View of Ben Crom (centre), Silent Valley Reservoir (bottom) and Ben Crom Reservoir (top right) from Slievenaglogh. Slieve Bearnagh is in the top left of the photo.
