= Binnian Tunnel =

Coordinates: 54.137°N 5.996°W

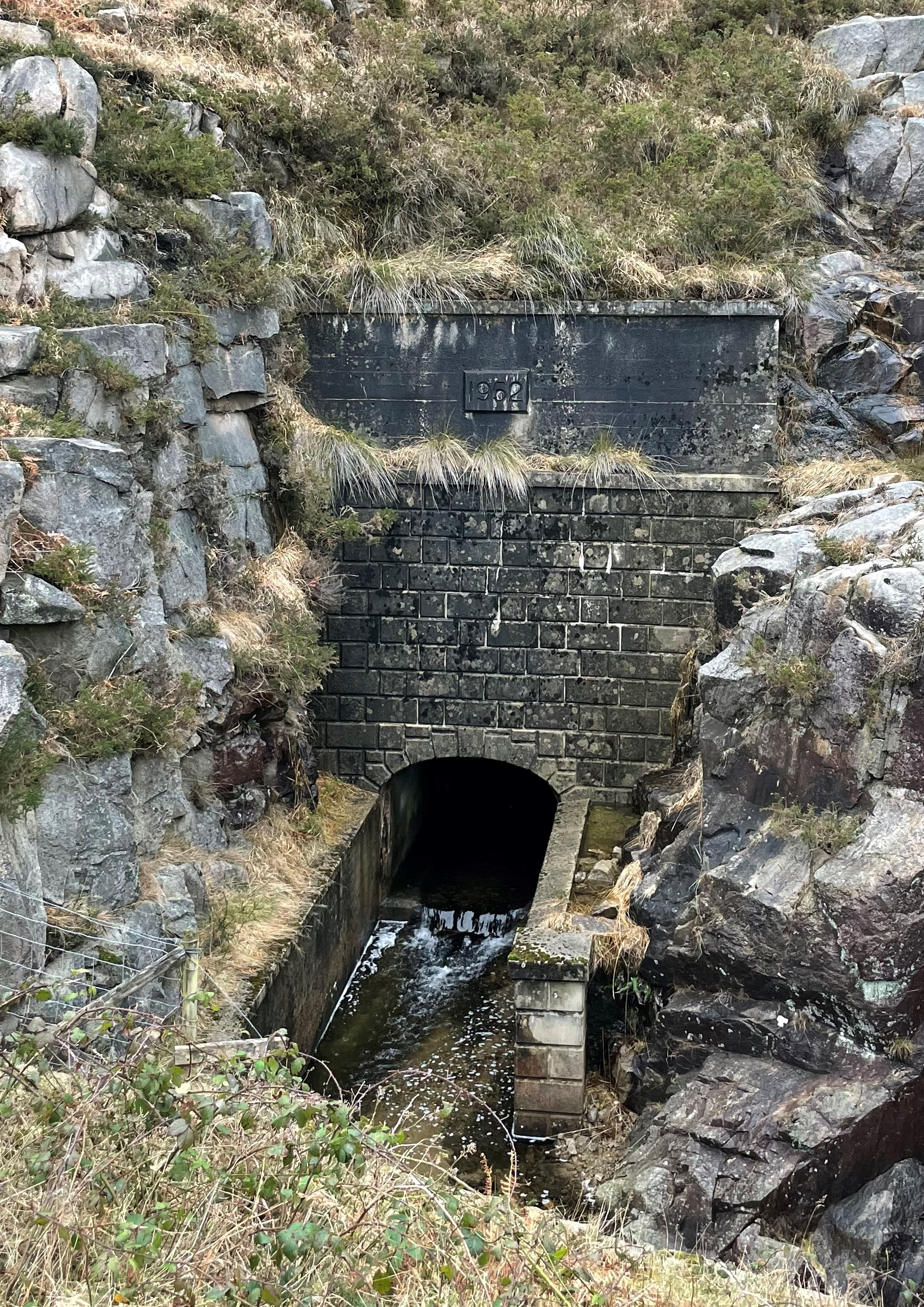
One end of the Binnian Tunnel, showing water discharging into the Silent Valley reservoir

The Binnian Tunnel (2.5 miles long) was constructed between 1947 and 1950/51 and is located under the Mourne Mountains in County Down, Northern Ireland. The main purpose of the tunnel is to divert water from the Annalong Valley to the Silent Valley Reservoir underneath Slieve Binnian, after which the tunnel was named.

A workforce of 150 was involved in two tunnelling teams which started from opposite ends and met in the middle nearly 800m under the roof of the mountain. When the two teams met in the middle on 6 December 1950, they were only inches out. The tunnel was created using drilling and blasting techniques. The shelters for the workers can be found on Slievenaglogh.

The tunnel was designed to carry 90 million imperial gallons (410,000 m^{3}) of water per day, be 2.5 miles (4.0 km) long, 7 feet (2.1 m) high and 8 feet (2.4 m) wide. The tunnel was officially opened in August 1952.

== See also ==
- Silent Valley Reservoir
- DRD Water Service
