= Slieve Lamagan =

Mountain in County Down, Northern Ireland

- Sliabh Lámhagáin
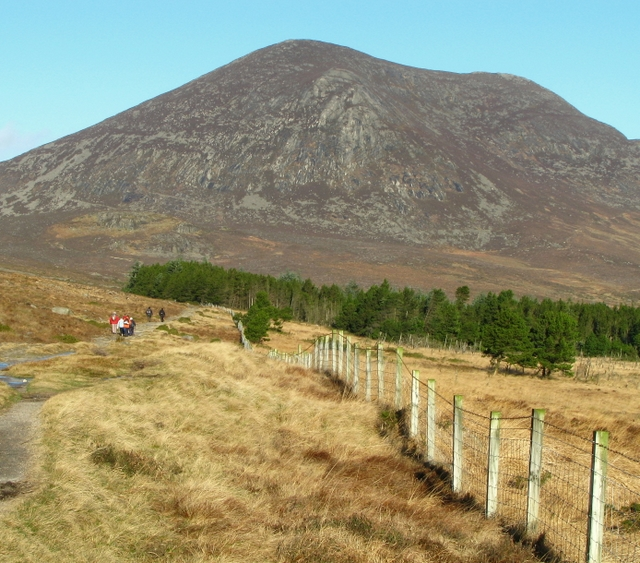
- Slieve Lamagan from the southeast

Highest point
- Elevation: 702.2 m (2,304 ft)
- Prominence: 198 m (650 ft)
- Listing: Hewitt, Marilyn
- Coordinates: 54°9′58″N 5°57′58″W

Naming
- Language of name: Irish

Geography
- Location within Northern Ireland
- Location: County Down, Northern Ireland
- Parent range: Mourne Mountains

Slieve Lamagan or Slievelamagan (SLEEV LAM-a-gan; from Irish Sliabh Lámhagáin, meaning 'mountain of crawling/creeping') is one of the Mourne Mountains in County Down, Northern Ireland. It has a height of 702.2 metres (2,304 ft). Slieve Lamagan stands in the middle of the high Eastern Mournes, overlooking Ben Crom Reservoir to the west, Annalong River valley to the east, and Cove Mountain to the northeast. At its southern foot is a small lake called Blue Lough, and a rock formation known as 'Percy Bysshe' .

It is said that the mountain was named Sliabh Lámhagáin, "mountain of crawling/creeping", because its steepness meant it had to be climbed in a crawling position. An older name was Slieve Snavan, from Sliabh Snámháin, which has the same meaning.

== See also ==
- Lists of mountains in Ireland
- List of mountains of the British Isles by height
- List of Marilyns in the British Isles
- List of Hewitt mountains in England, Wales and Ireland
