= Slieve Meelmore =

Mountain in Northern Ireland

Coordinates: 54°11′28″N 5°59′59″W

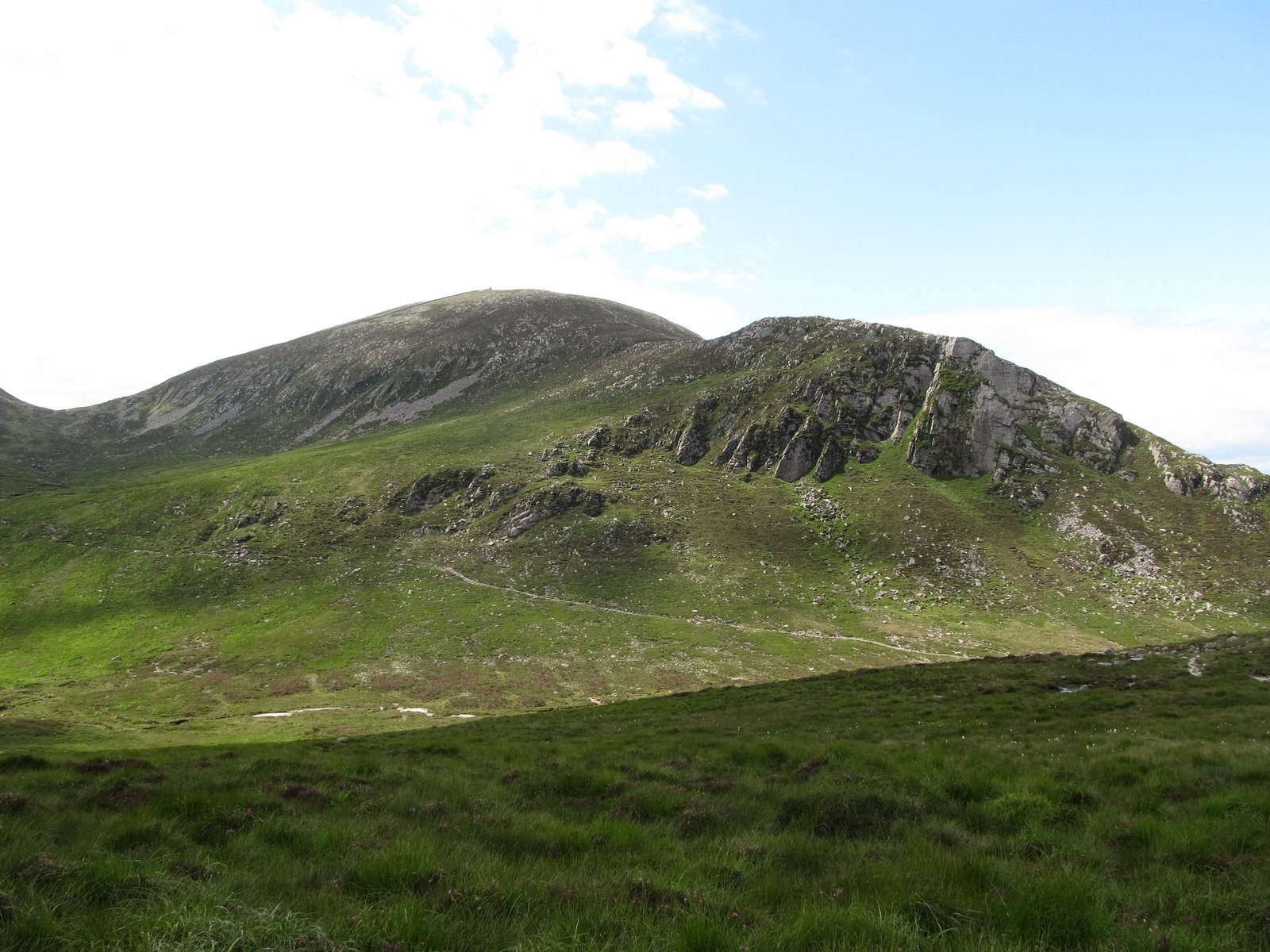
- Slieve Meelmore and its Spellack spur

Highest point
- Elevation: 680 m (2,230 ft)
- Prominence: 109 m (358 ft)
- Listing: Marilyn

Geography
- Location: County Down, Northern Ireland
- Parent range: Mourne Mountains
- OSI/OSNI grid: J30580 28689

Slieve Meelmore is one of the Mourne Mountains in County Down, Northern Ireland. It rises to 680 m (2230 ft) and is the seventh-highest of the Mournes. To its south is Slieve Meelbeg and to its east is Slieve Bearnagh. The Mourne Wall passes over its summit.

Slieve Meelmore is a popular hiking destination and is six miles (ten kilometres) east of the village of Hilltown.

== The seventh "Seven" ==
The mountain is mistakenly referred to as the seventh "Seven" in the annual Mourne Sevens challenge walk. This one-day event requires participating hillwalkers to visit all summits in the Mourne Mountains that are higher than 700 m (2,300 ft). When the event was first organised in 1992, a published map for the area displayed a spot height of 704 m (2,310 ft) at the mountain's summit. In 2004, a participant discovered that the actual spot height is several metres below the required 700 m.
