= Luke Livingston Macassey =

Irish civil engineer and barrister

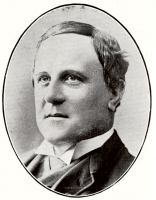
- Born: 7 April 1843
- Died: 9 May 1908 (aged 65)
- Occupations: civil engineer and barrister

Luke Livingstone Macassey (7 April 1843 – 9 May 1908) was an Irish civil engineer and barrister, notable for his contributions to public health by improving the water supply in parts of Ulster in the north of Ireland.

== Early life and family ==
Luke Livingston Macassey was born in Carrickfergus, County Antrim on 7 April 1843. His father was a Congregational minister. Macassey was orphaned as a child. He attended Foyle College, Derry, going on to study St Paul's School, London. He was privately tutored in land surveying and drawing from 1856 to 1859, after which he was a pupil to the mechanical engineers, George Fletcher & Co, from 1859 to 1863.

Macassey married a daughter of Rev. James White. They has 6 sons and 5 daughters, including Lynden, Verner, and Ernest.

== Career ==
Returning to Ireland, Macassey worked as an assistant to William Hastings in Belfast from 1863 to 1865, before being appointed resident engineer for Brown, Kent & Co. from 1865 to 1870. In 1872, he set up his own private practice in Belfast as a civil engineer.

In 1874 he was appointed consultant hydraulic engineer by the Belfast Water Commissioners, in which capacity he was instrumental in finding new sources of water for the expanding town, later city, of Belfast. He proposed use of a 9,000-acre (3,600 ha) catchment area in the Mourne Mountains and a three stage project:

1. The first stage was to divert water from the Kilkeel and Annalong rivers through the newly constructed Mourne Conduit to a reservoir at Carryduff. These water pipes were capable of supplying 10 million imperial gallons (45,000 m^{3}) of water per day. Work was completed in 1901.
2. The second stage was to build a storage reservoir, the Silent Valley Reservoir, across the Kilkeel River. Design work on this phase began in 1910, but procurement of the work was delayed by World War I. A contract was eventually awarded in 1923 to S. Pearson & Son and work continued until 1933.
3. The third stage was planned to be another storage reservoir in Annalong to impound the Annalong River. However, after the difficulties encountered in building the Silent Valley dam this second dam was not built.

Macassey served in this post until 1895, when his chief assistant, Frederick William McCullough, succeeded him. He continued his private practice, with his Belfast and London offices. His son, Verner, joining him in 1904. As a skilled arbitrator, he was called to the English bar in 1886, and worked on bills relating to engineering public works.

He also was the first to propose a direct rail link connecting Scotland with Ireland in the 1860s.

== Death and legacy ==
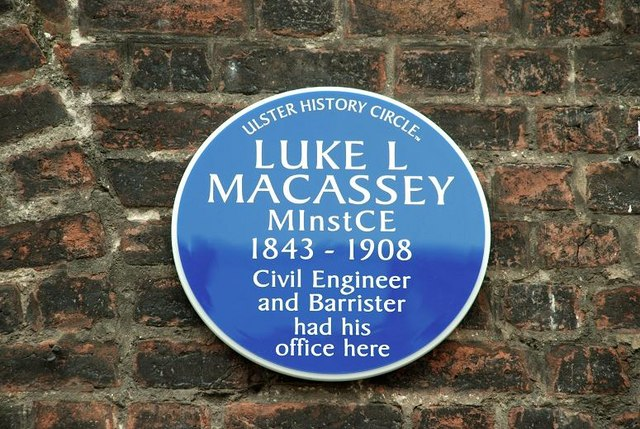
The Macassey blue plaque in Belfast

Macassey died on 9 May 1908. He was a freemason and member of the Loyal Orange Institution. In his obituary, friends noted "his varied accomplishments, his kindly humour, his skill as a raconteur, his sincerity of purpose, and his sterling, upright character."

Macassey is the subject of an Ulster History Circle blue plaque in Belfast.

== Selected publications ==
- Report of the proposed Railway Tunnel between Scotland and Ireland. With plan, etc. Belfast, 1868. (With Scott William)
- Hints on the Water Supply of Small Towns and Villages. London & Belfast, 1877.
- The Law relating to Civil Engineers, Architects and Contractors. Primarily intended for their own use. Stevens & Sons, London, 1890. (With James Andrew Strahan)
