= Mourne Conduit =

Former Irish water main

The Mourne Conduit is a water main which ran 42 kilometres (26 mi) from the Silent Valley Reservoir to Carryduff, near Belfast and was built between 1893 and 1901 for the Belfast City and District Water Commissioners. This was supplemented by additional pipelines twice in the 20th Century. This system supplied water to Greater Belfast and North Down for more than 100 years. It is labelled as the Mourne Aqueduct in Ordnance Survey maps from the early 20th century.

This system was partly replaced by the Aquarius Line, a dual pipeline between the Mourne Mountains and the Purdysburn Service Reservoir in Belfast which was constructed along with associated infrastructure as part of the Aquarius Mourne Water Project. The system provides water to approximately 20% of Northern Ireland's population.

== Mourne Conduit ==
In 1891, the Belfast Water Commissioners (BWC and later the Belfast City and District Water Commissioners or BC&DWC) hired Luke Livingston Macassey to investigate options for a source of an additional water supply for the expanding city of Belfast. Macassey selected the Mourne Mountains for the reasons summarised in a 1935 report:

The portion of the Mourne Mountains acquired by the Commissioners totals approximately 9,000 acres. It is all mountainland [sic], uninhabited, and a large part of it is rocky and precipitous. It extends from about 330 feet above sea-level to a maximum of 2,796 feet above sea-level, Slieve Donard being the highest mountain within the area. It is practically devoid of trees, being covered with heather, gorse, and bracken where not granite rock and boulders. The average rainfall on the area is 57.6 inches per annum. It is drained by two streams : on the west, the Kilkeel river flowing due south, and the Annalong river, lying parallel to and to the east of the Kilkeel river, draining the Annalong Valley. The catchment of the Kilkeel river is 5,500 acres in extent, that of the Annalong river being 3,500 acres. The water of both these rivers is similar and of excellent quality, having 2 degrees of hardness.

Macassey proposed a three stage project, with the Mourne Conduit part of the first phase. Construction occurred between 1893 and 1901 and involved the diversion of the Kilkeel and Annalong rivers into the new pipeline, the construction of a reservoir at Carryduff, and associated infrastructure. The Mourne Conduit consists of 7 miles of tunnel, 16 miles of concrete culvert and 12 miles of pressure pipeline. The second phase saw the completion of the Silent Valley Reservoir in 1933. Plans for the third phase reservoir in the Annalong valley were abandoned, with the Annalong river instead diverted into the Silent Valley Reservoir via the Binnian Tunnel which was completed in 1952.

Due to increased demand, the Mourne Conduit was supplemented by additional pipeline sections between 1934 and 1937, mainly in the Newcastle and Ballynahinch valleys. In 1947, a three year construction project commenced which saw the installation of a second conduit between Silent Valley and the Dunnywater Straining Well above Annalong. Between 1949 and 1956 Farrans was contracted to lay the "triplicate conduit" to increase the capacity of the system. That company would later work on the replacement Aquarius Line.

In 1973 the BC&DWC's responsibilities were assumed by the Department of the Environment. This body carried out a survey of the conduit which established the requirement to replace the 8 kilometres (5.0 mi) section of conduit between the Annalong valley and the Donard Tunnel with pre-stressed concrete pipes. These works also include the lining of the tunnel through Slieve Donard with precast concrete liners.

Lime dosing plants were built in 1985 along the route of the conduit at Silent Valley, Dunmore, and Carryduff.

=== Lodges ===
6 identical lodges were built along the route of the conduit for "water attendants" or "linesman" between 1899 and 1901. These attendants monitored the conduit, flushed valves, and carried out general maintenance work. They had access through boundaries via red gates marked with "BWC" along the route. The 6 lodges are at Tullybranigan near Newcastle, Ballybannon and Drumanaquoile near Castlewellan, and Dunmore, Ballykine and Brae Road (Creevytenant), near Ballynahinch.

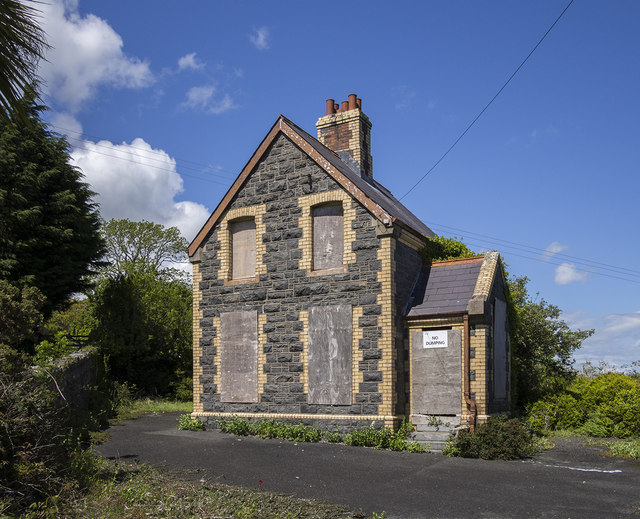
1 of 6 lodges built as part of the Mourne Conduit scheme.

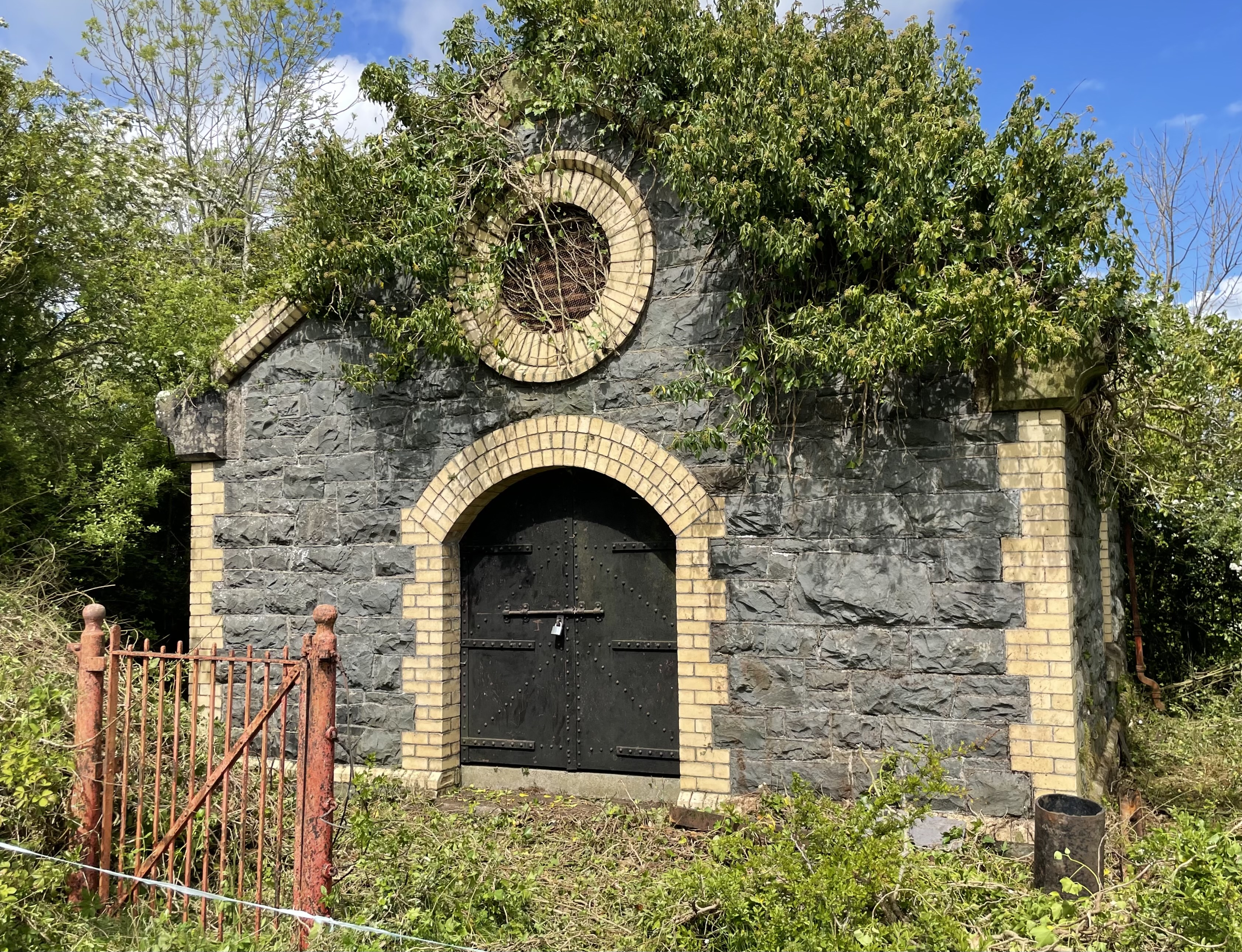
A well house above the Mourne Conduit near Ballynahinch and red access gate, now both listed.

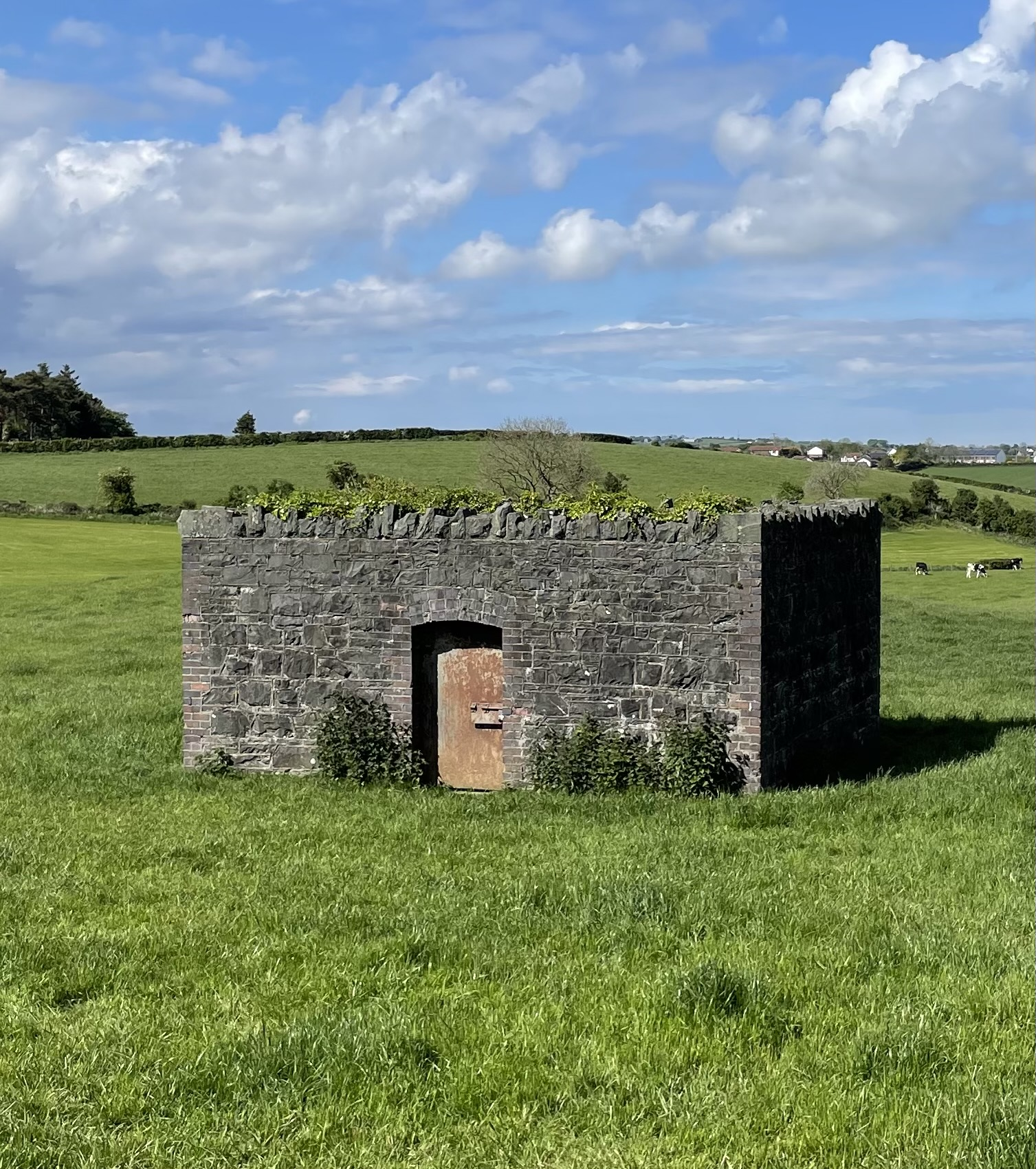
Air well above the Mourne Conduit near Carryduff

== Aquarius Line ==
The requirement to replace the Mourne Conduit was identified in the early 1990s by the Water Executive. This ultimately resulted in the Aquarius Mourne Water Project, a three phase £62 million project to replace the Mourne Conduit and pipelines with new 900mm and 1200mm pipelines laid concurrently, along with associated infrastructure.

- Aquarius 1 - The first phase involved the construction of a water pumping station at Drumaroad which pumps water up 60m to a break pressure tank on the nearby Dunmore Mountain, the latter was also constructed as part of the project. This phase also saw the replacement of 20 kilometres (12 mi) of the Mourne Conduit between the pumping station and Ballynahinch and it was completed between May 1999 and May 2000.
- Aquarius 2 - 11 kilometres (6.8 mi) of new pipeline from Ballynahinch to Belfast and from the Mourne Mountains to Drumaroad along with another pumping station. Ten service reservoirs along the route were also included in works as part of "The Valley Distribution Scheme".
- Aquarius 3 - Construction of a £20 million water treatment works at Drumaroad which was designed to treat up to 155 million litres of water a day. This was officially opened by then Secretary of State for Northern Ireland, Peter Hain, in November 2005.

The system provides water to approximately 20% of Northern Ireland's population.

In 2020, NI Water awarded a £13 million contract to Graham Construction for an expansion of water treatment facilities at the works.

Installation of the pipelines

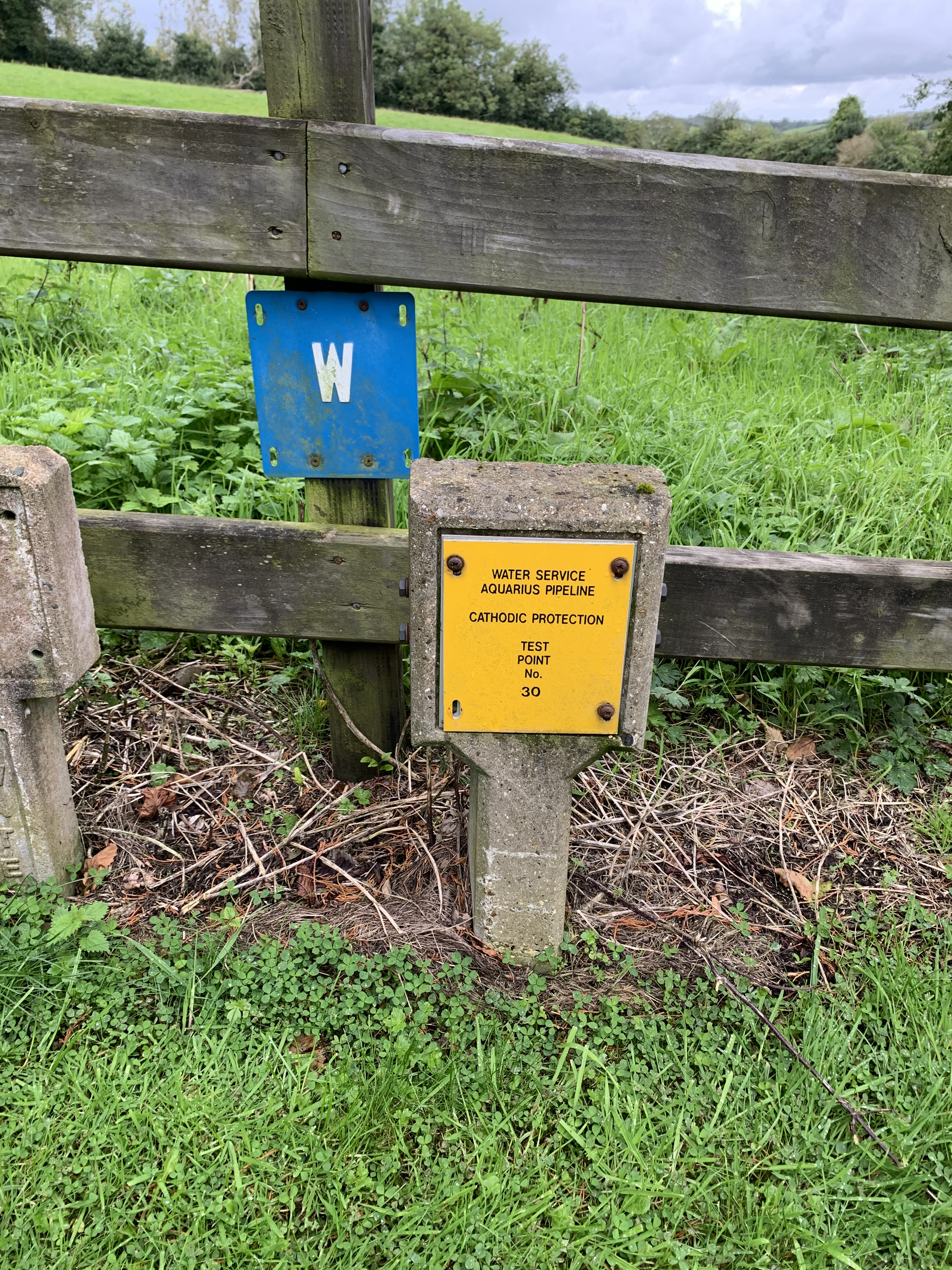
Marker posts for the Aquarius line water main near Ballynahinch.

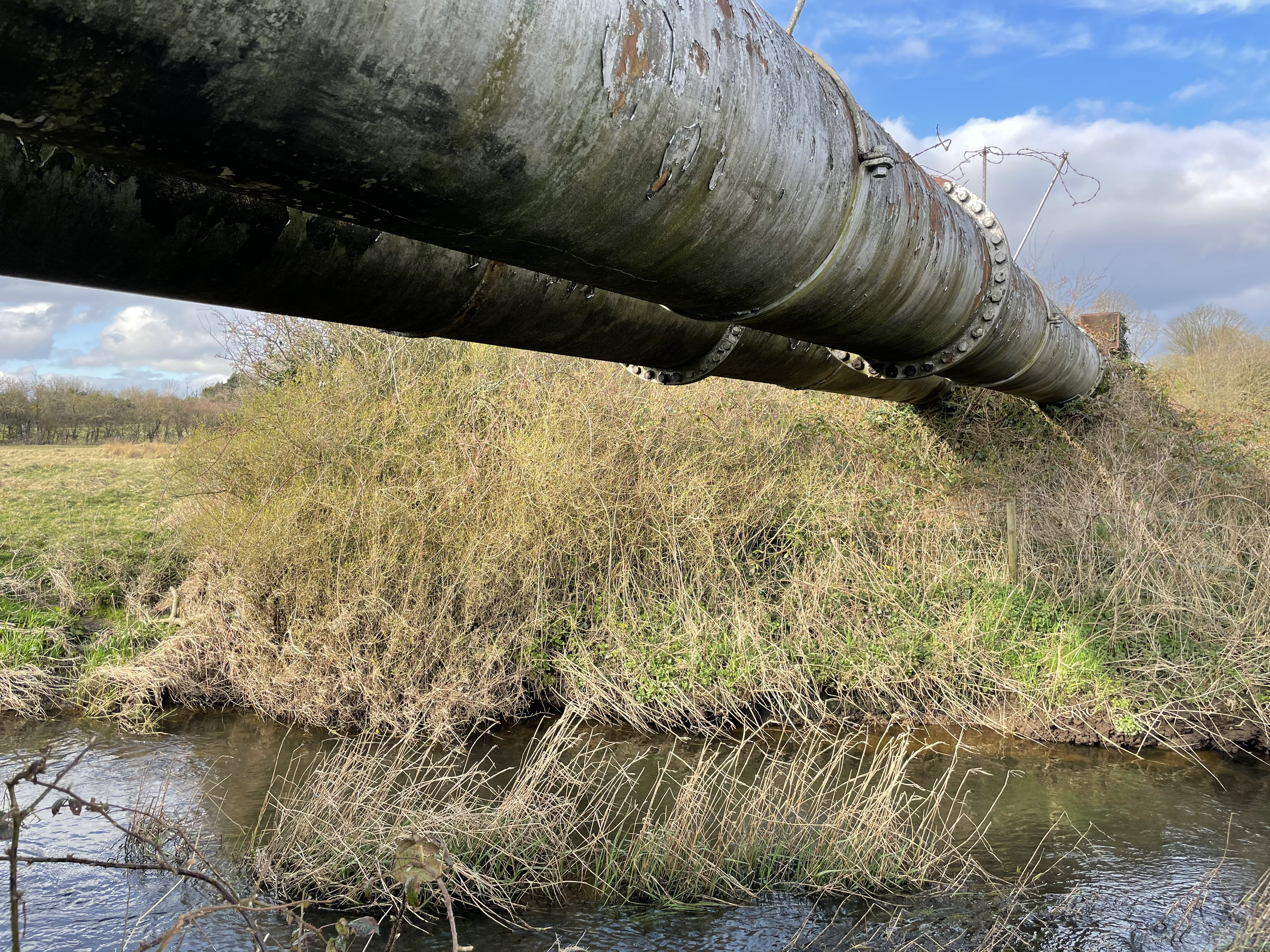
Aquarius dual water pipeline crossing the Ballynahinch River
