= Slieve Corragh =

Mountain in the Mourne Mountains, Northern Ireland

- Sliabh Corrach
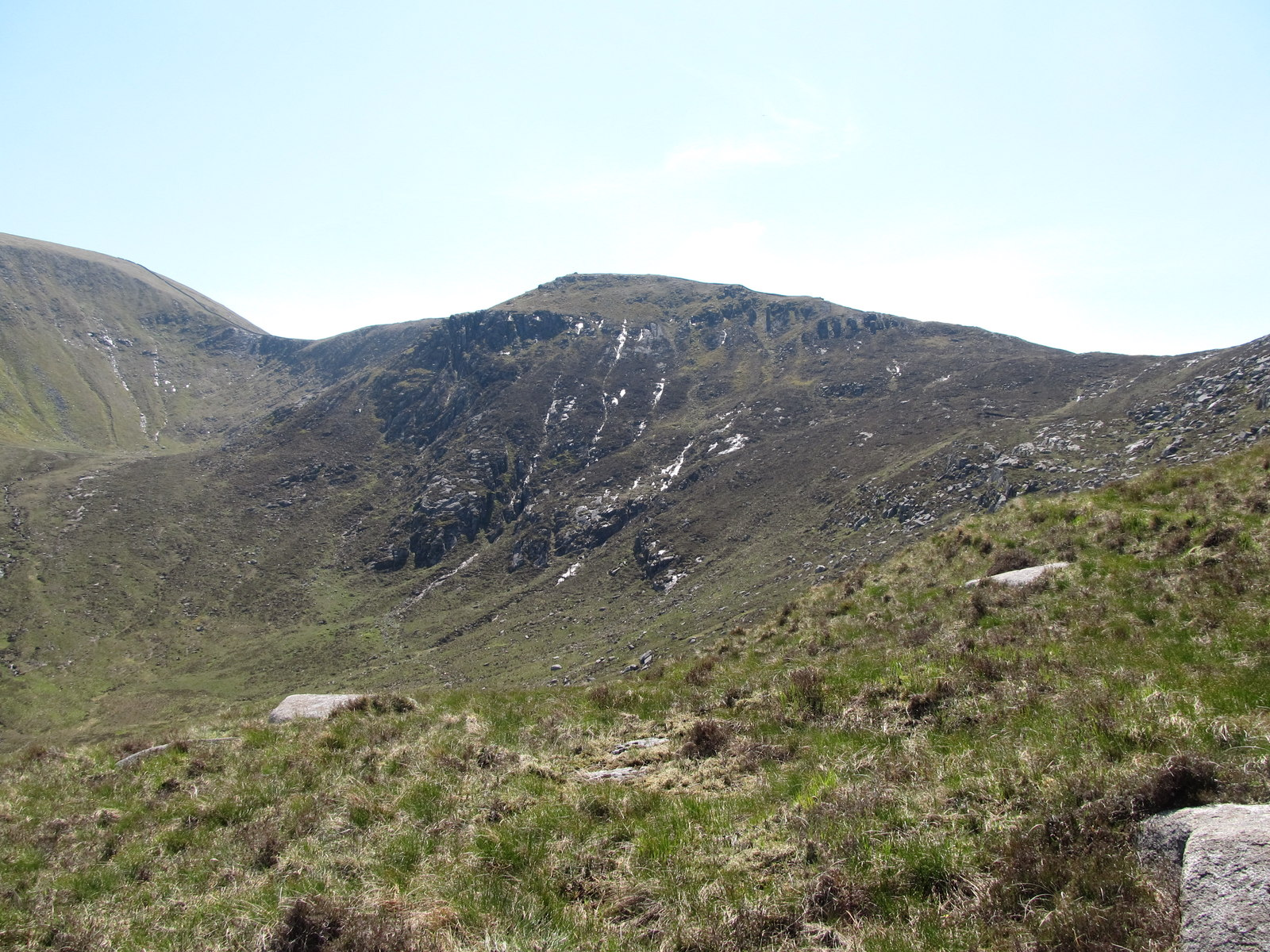
- Slieve Corragh, seen from Slievenaglogh

Highest point
- Elevation: 640 m (2,100 ft)
- Coordinates: 54°11′21″N 5°57′09″W

Geography
- Location within Northern Ireland
- Location: County Down, Northern Ireland
- Parent range: Mourne Mountains

Slieve Corragh (/sliːv ˈkɒrə/ SLEEV KORRA; from Irish Sliabh Corrach, meaning '"rugged/pointed mountain" or "sheep hill"') is one of the Mourne Mountains in County Down, Northern Ireland. It has a height of 640 metres (2,100 ft).

== Location ==
Slieve Corragh is one of the Mourne Mountains, and the Mourne Wall passes east–west on the mountaintop. It is part of the Slieve Commedagh massif, and Slieve Commedagh itself is placed on its east. On its west lies Slievenaglogh.
