= Slieve Beg =

Mountain in the Mourne Mountains, Northern Ireland

Coordinates: 54°10′48″N 5°56′52″W

Slieve Beg (SLEEV BEG; from Irish Sliabh Beag, meaning 'little mountain') is one of the Mourne Mountains in County Down, Northern Ireland. It has a height of 595.9 metres (1,955 ft).
