= Lynden Macassey =

Barrister and labour lawyer

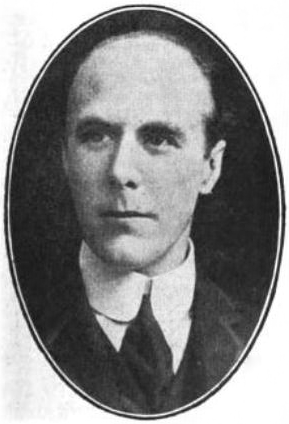
- In The Railway News, 26 August 1916
- Born: Lynden Livingston Macassey; 14 June 1876; Carrickfergus, Northern Ireland
- Died: 23 February 1963 (aged 86); London, England
- Education: Bedford School; Trinity College, Dublin
- Occupation(s): Barrister, lawyer
- Spouse: Jeanne McFarland (m. 1903)
- Children: 3
- Father: Luke Livingston Macassey

Sir Lynden Livingston Macassey, KBE, QC (1876–1963), was a barrister and labour lawyer.

== Biography ==
Born on 14 June 1876 in Carrickfergus, Larne, County Antrim, Lynden Macassey was the son of the engineer and barrister Luke Livingston Macassey. He was educated at Bedford School and Trinity College, Dublin. He was called to the bar in 1899 by the Middle Temple. Between 1901 and 1909, he lectured in economics and law at the London School of Economics.

He married Jeanne McFarland on 15 April 1903, and they had three children.

During the First World War, he became involved in industrial unrest amongst munitions workers on the River Clyde, producing a report with Lord Balfour of Burleigh in 1915. His recommendations were incorporated into the Munitions of War (Amendment) Act 1916. In 1916, he negotiated agreements for the formation of joint committees of employers and shop stewards on the River Clyde. However, he was supportive of the controversial deportation from Glasgow of the militant labour leader, David Kirkwood.

In 1922, Macassey became one of the labour assessors for the British government on the Permanent Court of International Justice at The Hague. His seminal work, Labour Policy: False and True, was also published in 1922.

Macassey died at his home in London on 23 February 1963.
