= Slieve Commedagh =

Mountain in Northern Ireland

- Sliabh Coimheádach
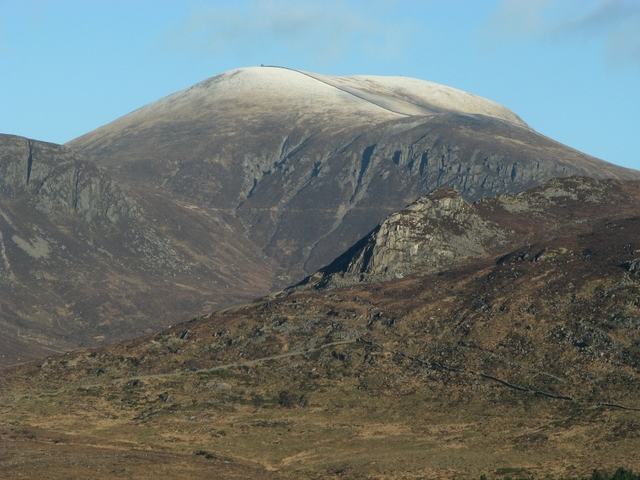
- Slieve Commedagh from the south

Highest point
- Elevation: 767 m (2,516 ft)
- Prominence: 180 m (590 ft)
- Listing: Marilyn, Hewitt
- Coordinates: 54°11′20″N 5°56′19″W

Naming
- English translation: mountain of guarding/watching
- Language of name: Irish

Geography
- Location: County Down, Northern Ireland
- Parent range: Mournes
- OSI/OSNI grid: J346286
- Topo map: OSNI Discoverer 29

Slieve Commedagh (SLEEV COM-eh-da; from Irish Sliabh Coimhéideach, meaning 'the guarding/watching mountain') is a mountain with a height of 767 m (2,516 ft) in County Down, Northern Ireland. After Slieve Donard, it is the second-highest of the Mourne Mountains and the second-highest mountain in Northern Ireland.

Slieve Commedagh is northwest of Slieve Donard, and the two are linked by a col. Further west of Slieve Commedagh is the lower summit of Slieve Corragh. The Mourne Wall passes east–west over the mountaintop, and there is a small tower at the summit. There are also the remains of an ancient burial cairn on the mountaintop. Slieve Commedagh overlooks the Glen River to the east, and the Pot of Legawherry to the west.

On its southern side are a group of granite tors known as 'the Castles'. This overlooks the Brandy Pad, a track used in the 18th century to smuggle commodities such as brandy and tobacco, mainly from Britain.

The Slieve Commedagh massif also includes the lesser summits of Shan Slieve, Slievenamaddy and Slievenabrock (to the north).

== Gallery ==
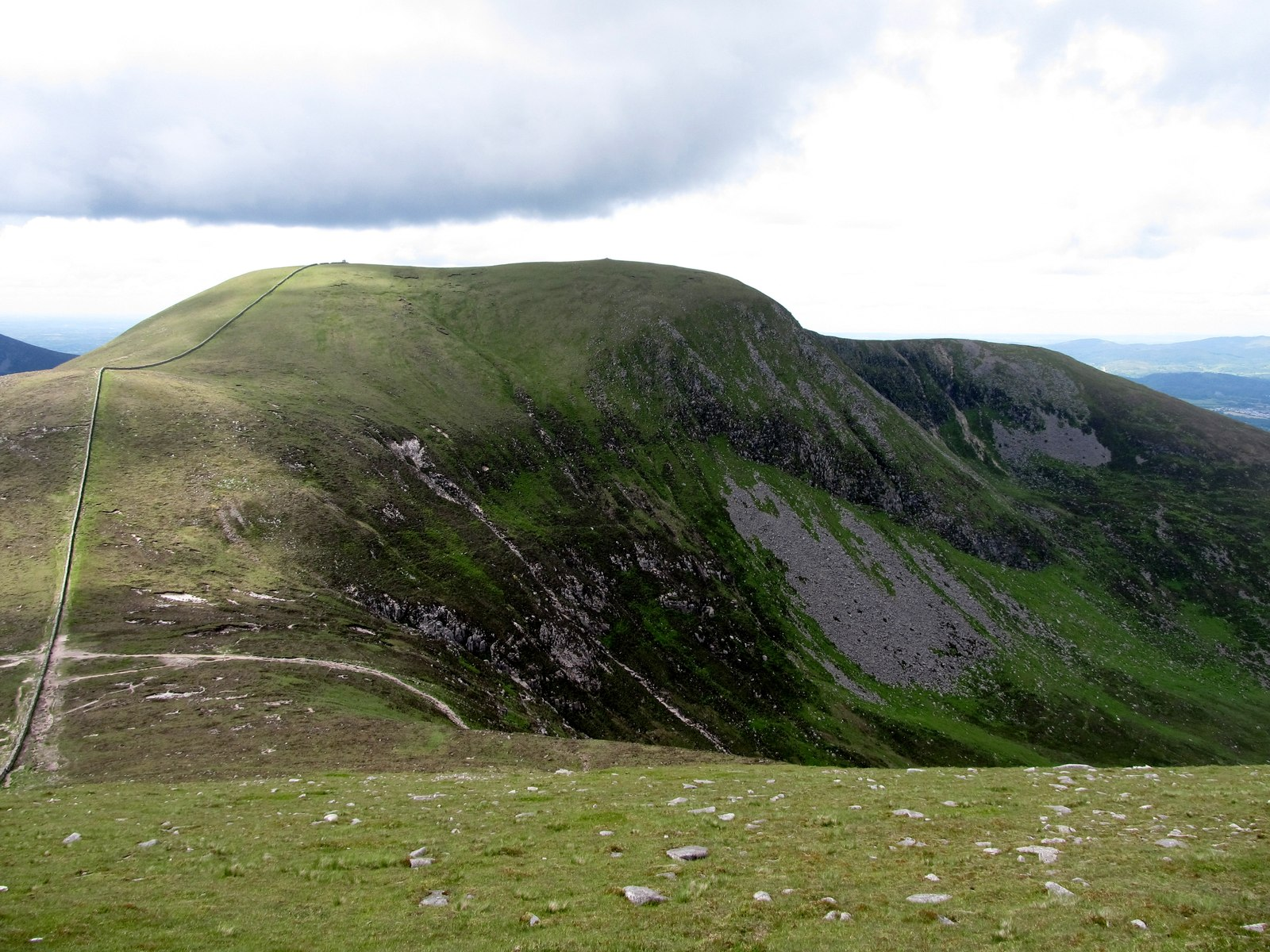
Slieve Commedagh and the Mourne Wall viewed from Slieve Donard

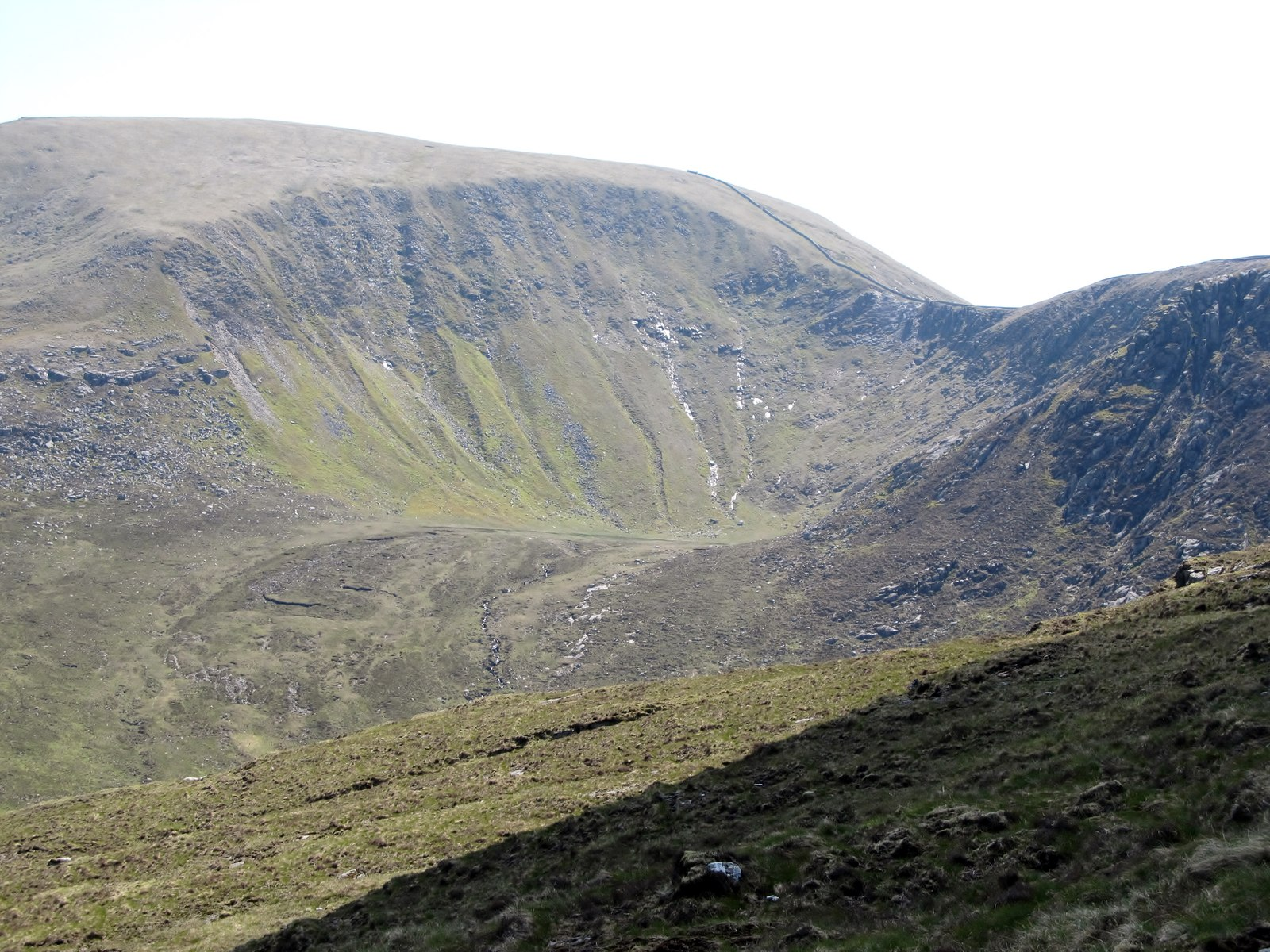
The Pot of Legawherry from the slopes of Slievenaglogh

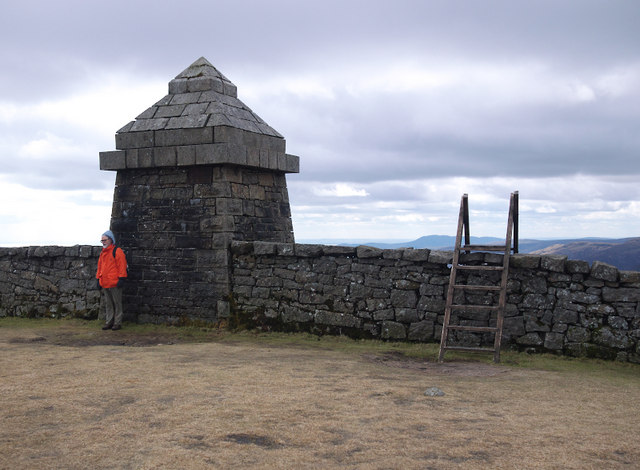
The tower on Slieve Commedagh

== See also ==
- List of mountains in Ireland
