= Ben Crom Reservoir =

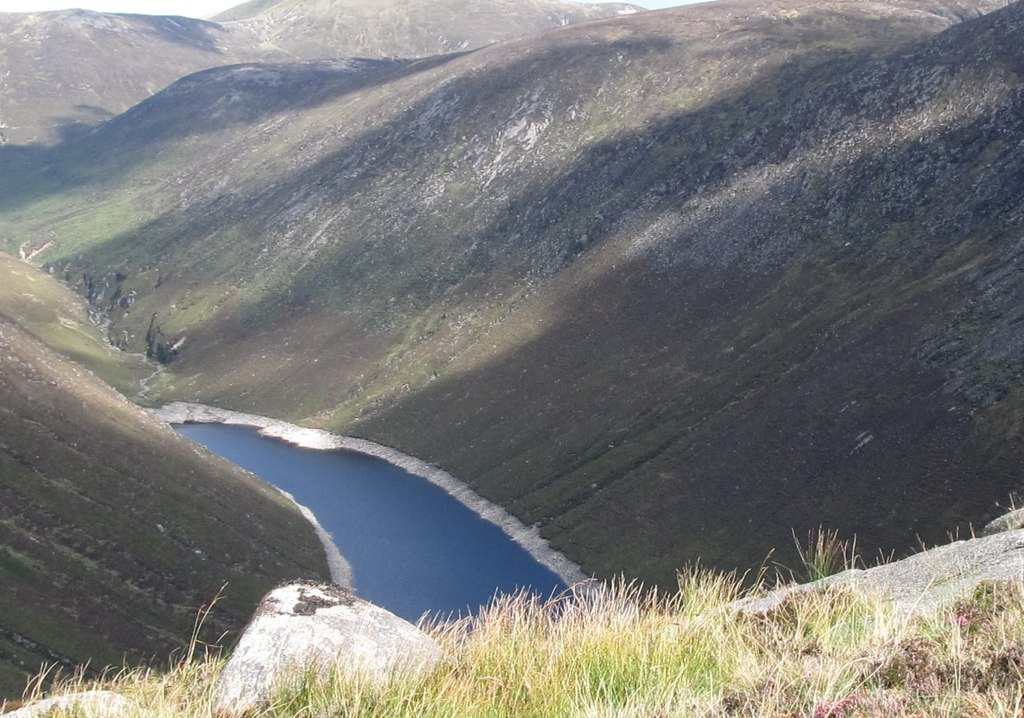
- The Ben Crom Reservoir from the summit ride of Ben Crom

- Location within County Down
- Location: County Down, Northern Ireland
- Coordinates: 54°10′05″N 05°58′55″W
- Type: reservoir
- Etymology: Ben Crom Mountain
- River sources: Kilkeel River
- Managing agency: Northern Ireland Water
- Built: 1953
- First flooded: 1957
- Max. length: 700 feet (210 m)
- Water volume: 1,700 million litres (1.7 hm^{3}; 1,400 acre⋅ft)

Ben Crom Reservoir is a reservoir located in the Mourne Mountains near Kilkeel, County Down, Northern Ireland. Along with Silent Valley Reservoir, which is situated further down the Kilkeel River valley, it supplies water for County Down, surrounding counties and most of Belfast. It was constructed between 1953 and 1957, as the final part of the Mourne scheme to provide water to Belfast which started with the passing of the Belfast Water Act 1893.

Ben Crom is a mass gravity dam, meaning it is made of concrete and designed so that the dam's own weight stabilises it against the force of the water. The middle of the structure consists of mass concrete with granite plumbs weighing up to 5 tonnes. The outer face of the dam was made with precast concrete blocks. The project cost approximately £1 million to build and employed 186 people.

In 2012 Northern Ireland Water carried out refurbishments at Ben Crom as part of a £1.6 million scheme to maintain and improve a number of reservoirs in Northern Ireland.

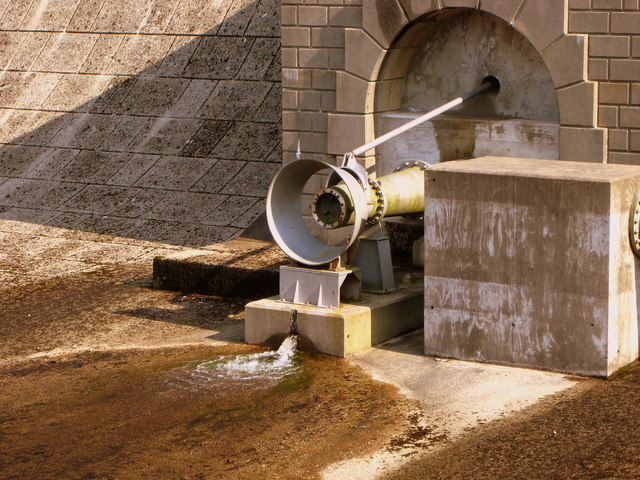
Ben Crom Reservoir Outflow at the bottom of the reservoir wall

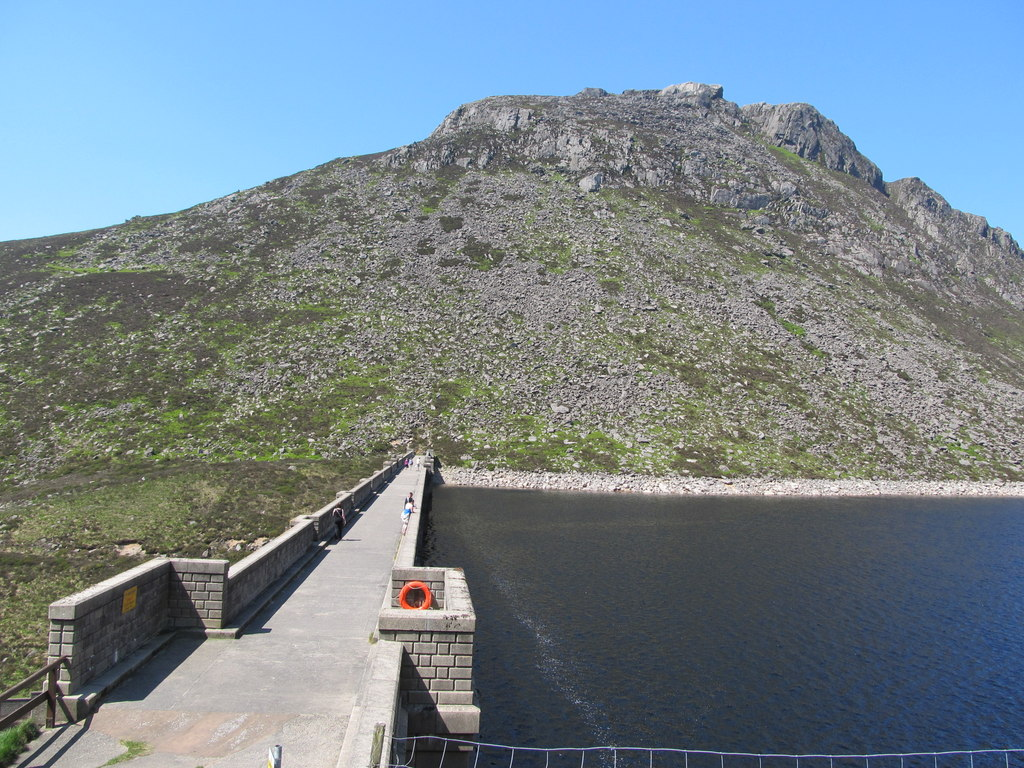
The Ben Crom Dam. Behind the dam is the Ben Crom Reservoir with a capacity of 1,700,000,000 litres. The hill in the background is also known as Ben Crom

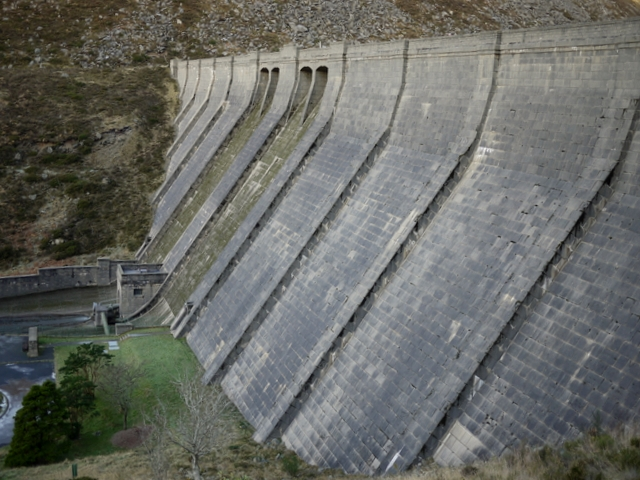
View of the dam wall at the Ben Crom Reservoir
