= Slieve Muck =

Mountain in Northern Ireland

- Sliabh Muc
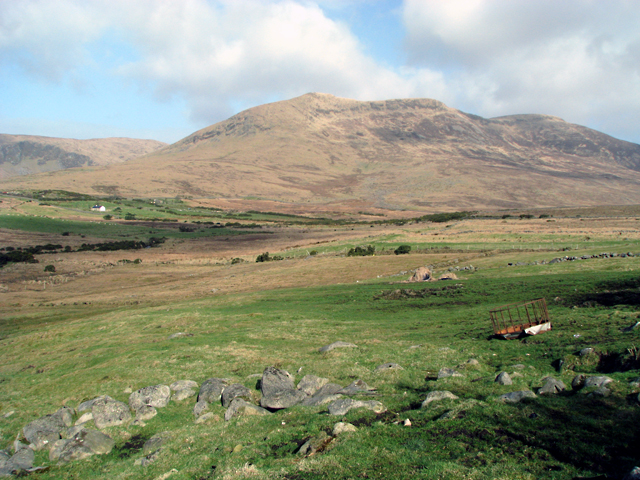
- The southern slopes of Slieve Muck

Highest point
- Elevation: 670.4 m (2,199 ft)
- Prominence: 156 m (512 ft)
- Listing: Marilyn, Hewitt
- Coordinates: 54°09′29″N 6°02′23″W

Geography
- Location within Northern Ireland
- Location: County Down, Northern Ireland
- Parent range: Mourne Mountains
- OSI/OSNI grid: J282250
- Topo map: OSNI Landranger 29, OSNI Outdoor Pursuits map Mourne Country

Slieve Muck (/sliːv mʌk/ SLEEV MUK; from Irish Sliabh Muc, meaning 'pig mountain') is one of the Mourne Mountains in County Down, Northern Ireland. It has a height of 670.4 metres (2,199 ft). The River Bann has its source on the northern slope.

Slieve Muck has three summits which are composed of Silurian shale covering the underlying granite. The shale forms an escarpment near the eastern side of the summits. The western slope is grassy and has a number of small streams flowing into the Deer's Meadow below. The eastern slope below the escarpment is made up of stony scree with lighter coloured areas appearing to spell out POV when seen from a distance, local people have used their imagination to complete the word Poverty, which has led to the mountain also being referred to as Poverty Mountain.

== Physical characteristics ==
Standing at 673 metres above sea level, Slieve Muck forms the geological junction between the Eastern and Central Mournes. The mountain consists of three summits composed of Silurian shales overlying granite, with a distinctive well-defined escarpment on its southern and eastern sides. The mountain has markedly different vegetation patterns on its opposing slopes. The western slope is dominated by wet rough grassland where Nardus stricta (mat-grass) is the predominant species. In contrast, the eastern slope is predominantly covered with heather (Ericaceae), with Calluna vulgaris (common heather) occurring more frequently than Erica species. Near the summit, vegetation becomes noticeably sparser, characterized as unimproved acid grassland according to vegetation surveys conducted in the early 1990s.

The soil composition varies across the mountain. The hard siliceous granites of the Mourne uplands, combined with the wet climate, have given rise to poor infertile soils. These include freely-draining acid brown earths and highly leached, extremely acid peat podsols. Blanket peats measuring between 0.2–0.3 meters deep cover the mountain regardless of elevations. On the wetter western flanks, species of Sphagnum (bog moss) are common, while the overall plant cover near the summit is reduced compared to lower elevations. Pollen analysis studies conducted in 1989–1990 indicate that these vegetation patterns have remained largely unchanged for at least three centuries, suggesting the current ecological character of Slieve Muck is of considerable antiquity.
