= Silent Valley Reservoir =

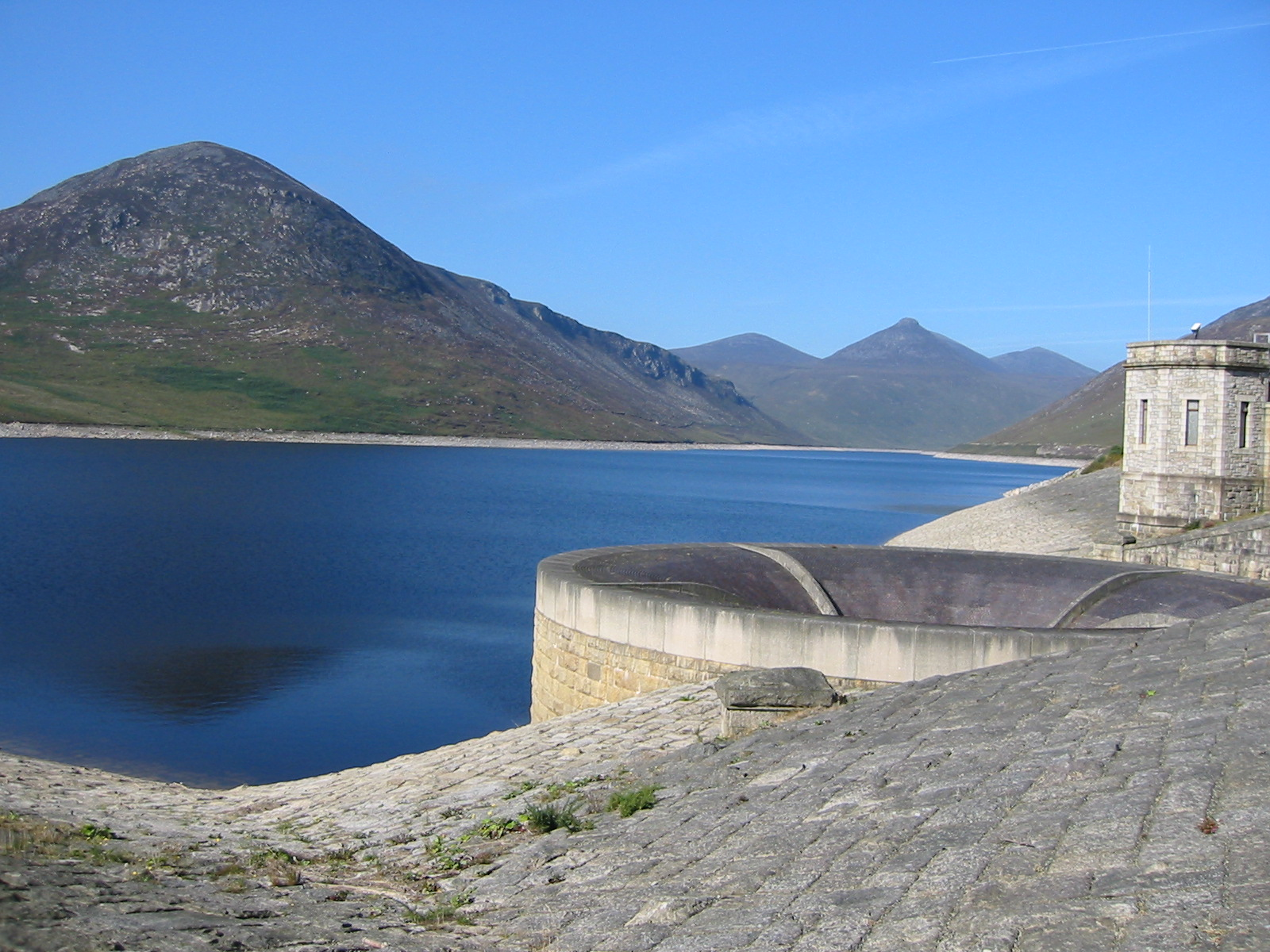

- Location within County Down
- Location: County Down, Northern Ireland
- Coordinates: 54°08′N 6°00′W
- Lake type: reservoir
- Basin countries: United Kingdom, Ireland

The Silent Valley Reservoir is a reservoir located in the Mourne Mountains near Kilkeel, County Down in Northern Ireland. It supplies most of the water for County Down, surrounding counties and most of Belfast. It is owned and maintained by Northern Ireland Water Limited (formerly DRD Water Service). The reservoir was built between 1923 and 1933 by a workforce of over 1,000 men, nine of whom died during construction.

== History ==
In 1891, the Belfast Water Commissioners (BWC and later the Belfast City and District Water Commissioners or BC&DWC) hired Luke Livingston Macassey to investigate options for a source of an additional water supply for the expanding city of Belfast. Macassey selected the Mourne Mountains for the reasons summarised in a 1935 report:

The portion of the Mourne Mountains acquired by the Commissioners totals approximately 9,000 acres. It is all mountainland [sic], uninhabited, and a large part of it is rocky and precipitous. It extends from about 330 feet above sea-level to a maximum of 2,796 feet above sea-level, Slieve Donard being the highest mountain within the area. It is practically devoid of trees, being covered with heather, gorse, and bracken where not granite rock and boulders. The average rainfall on the area is 57.6 inches per annum. It is drained by two streams : on the west, the Kilkeel river flowing due south, and the Annalong river, lying parallel to and to the east of the Kilkeel river, draining the Annalong Valley. The catchment of the Kilkeel river is 5,500 acres in extent, that of the Annalong river being 3,500 acres. The water of both these rivers is similar and of excellent quality, having 2 degrees of hardness.

Private acts of Parliament – the Belfast Water Act 1893, the Belfast Water Act 1897 and the Belfast Water Act 1899 – allowed the BC&DWC to secure the 9,000-acre (3,600 ha) catchment area with associated access and water rights. At the time the catchment was capable of providing some 30 million imperial gallons (140,000 m^{3}) of water per day, however as this much was not required immediately, a three phase approach was followed:

1. The first stage was to divert water from the Kilkeel and Annalong rivers through the newly constructed Mourne Conduit to a reservoir at Carryduff. These water pipes were capable of supplying 10 million imperial gallons (45,000 m^{3}) of water per day. Work was completed in 1901.
2. The second stage was to build a storage reservoir, the Silent Valley Reservoir, across the Kilkeel River. Design work on this phase began in 1910, but procurement of the work was delayed by World War I. A contract was eventually awarded in 1923 to S. Pearson & Son and work continued until 1933.
3. The third stage was planned to be another storage reservoir in Annalong to impound the Annalong River. However, after the difficulties encountered in building the Silent Valley dam the second dam was not built. Instead, a tunnel was driven under Slieve Binnian between 1947 and 1951 to bring water from the Annalong river to the Silent Valley reservoir. Between 1953 and 1957, a second dam was built further up the Kilkeel river valley to create Ben Crom Reservoir.

The Mournes catchment area is surrounded by the Mourne Wall, built entirely by hand. Started in 1904, it took 18 years to complete.

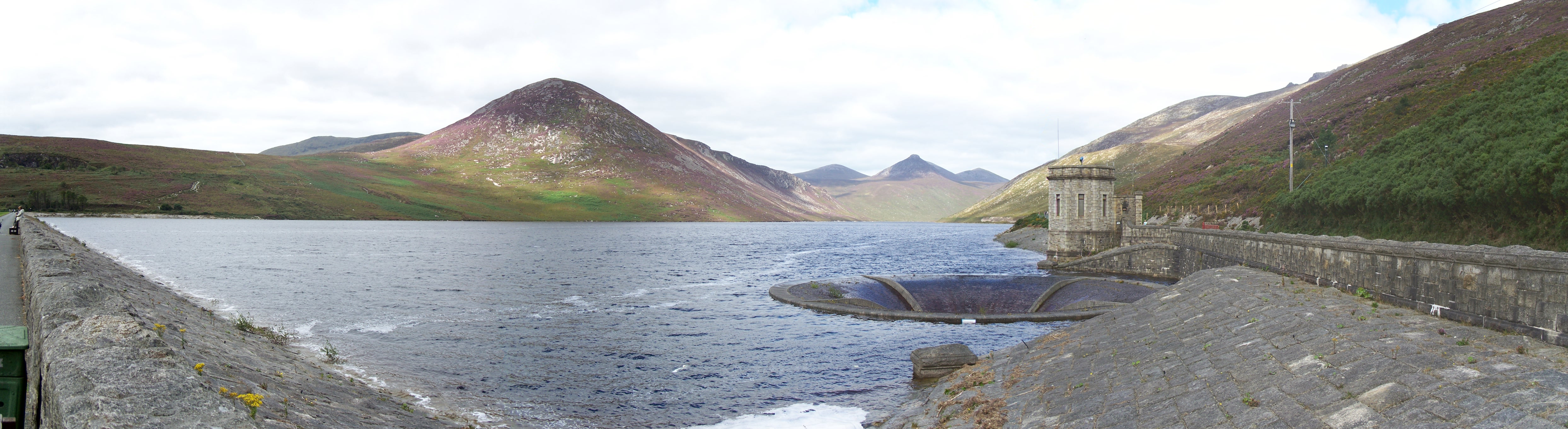
Panorama of the Silent Valley Reservoir

=== Naming ===
An old name for the valley was Glen Setanta from a legend that the young Cú Chulainn spent time there. In the 1800s it was called Happy Valley apparently due to the jollity of prospecting Cornish miners. The name Silent Valley is supposed to derive from the absence of bird life during the long construction project.

== The Binnian Tunnel ==
Between 1947 and 1951 over 150 men drove a tunnel underneath Slieve Binnian. The tunnel was built to carry water from the Annalong valley to the Silent Valley Dam, which had been completed in 1933, 14 years earlier. This was to further supply the growing demands of Belfast's water supply. Two work squads began at each end of the tunnel, and met half way almost 800 metres under the mountain. The technology in the day was lacking in every standard, and was lit by candlelight. When the two squads met, they were mere inches off. The tunnel measures 8 feet (2.4 m) square – and 2.25 miles (3.62 km) long. Its entry is at Dunnywater and its exit is on the roadside, a short distance from the visitor's centre. The Binnian Tunnel was officially opened on Thursday, 28 August 1952.
