= Slieve Binnian =

Mountain in the Mourne Mountains, Northern Ireland

Coordinates: 54.14272°N 5.98083°W

- Sliabh Binneáin
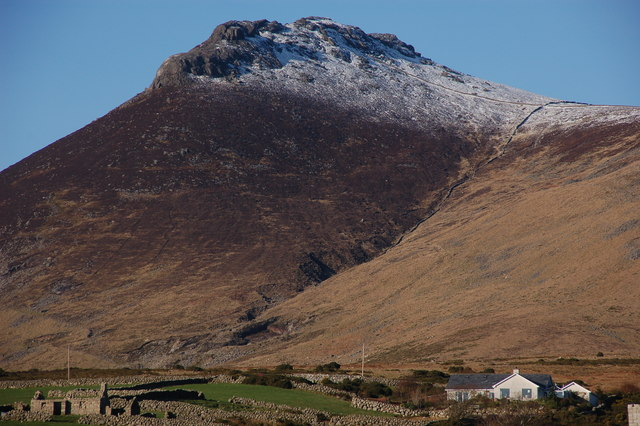
- Slieve Binnian with a light dusting of snow

Highest point
- Elevation: 746 m (2,448 ft)
- Prominence: 349 m (1,145 ft)
- Listing: Marilyn, Hewitt

Geography
- Location: County Down, Northern Ireland
- Parent range: Mourne Mountains
- OSI/OSNI grid: J320234
- Topo map: OSNI Landranger 29, OSNI Outdoor Pursuits map Mourne Country

Slieve Binnian (SLEEV BIN-yan; from Irish Sliabh Binneáin, meaning 'mountain of the little peaks') is one of the Mourne Mountains in County Down, Northern Ireland, 9 km north of Kilkeel. It is the third-highest mountain in Northern Ireland at 747 metres (2,451 ft). The summit is broad and flat with rocky tors at the north and south ends, with the Back Castles, impressive towers of granite, in between. To the south-west is Wee Binnian (from Irish Broinn Bhinneáin, meaning 'breast of Binneán') (460m). It lies east of Silent Valley Reservoir and west of the Annalong Valley. The Mourne Wall also crosses over Slieve Binnian.

The mountain is in the townland of Brackenagh East Upper (379 acres), the civil parish of Kilkeel and the historic barony of Mourne.

== Places of interest ==
- Overlooking Annalong Wood on the eastern slopes of Slieve Binnian is the disused quarry of Douglas Crag.
- What appears to be the remains of an abandoned quarrying village lies on the south eastern slopes of Slieve Binnian. Ruins of rock huts are spread across a landscape littered with part quarried rock.

== Binnian Tunnel ==
The Binnian Tunnel (2.5 miles long) was built between 1947 and 1950/51 underneath Slieve Binnian, to transport water from the Annalong Valley to the Silent Valley. A workforce of 150 was involved in two tunnelling teams which started from opposite ends and met in the middle nearly 800m under the roof of the mountain. Having been carefully measuring their positions the whole time, they found they were only two inches off course when the two tunnels met.
