= Slieve Meelbeg =

Mountain in the Mourne Mountains, Northern Ireland

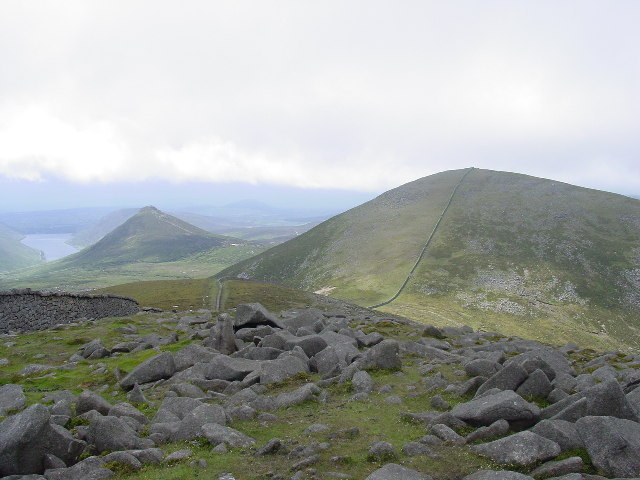
- Slieve Meelbeg from Slieve Meelmore

Highest point
- Elevation: 702 m (2,303 ft)
- Prominence: 182 m (597 ft)
- Listing: Marilyn
- Coordinates: 54°11′02″N 6°00′30″W

Geography
- Location: County Down, Northern Ireland
- Parent range: Mourne Mountains
- OSI/OSNI grid: J3008027889

Slieve Meelbeg is a mountain in the Mourne Mountains in Northern Ireland. It is a popular hiking destination and is 5.5 mi (9 km) east of the village of Hilltown, County Down.
