= Mourne Mountains =

Mountain range in Northern Ireland

- Beanna Boirche
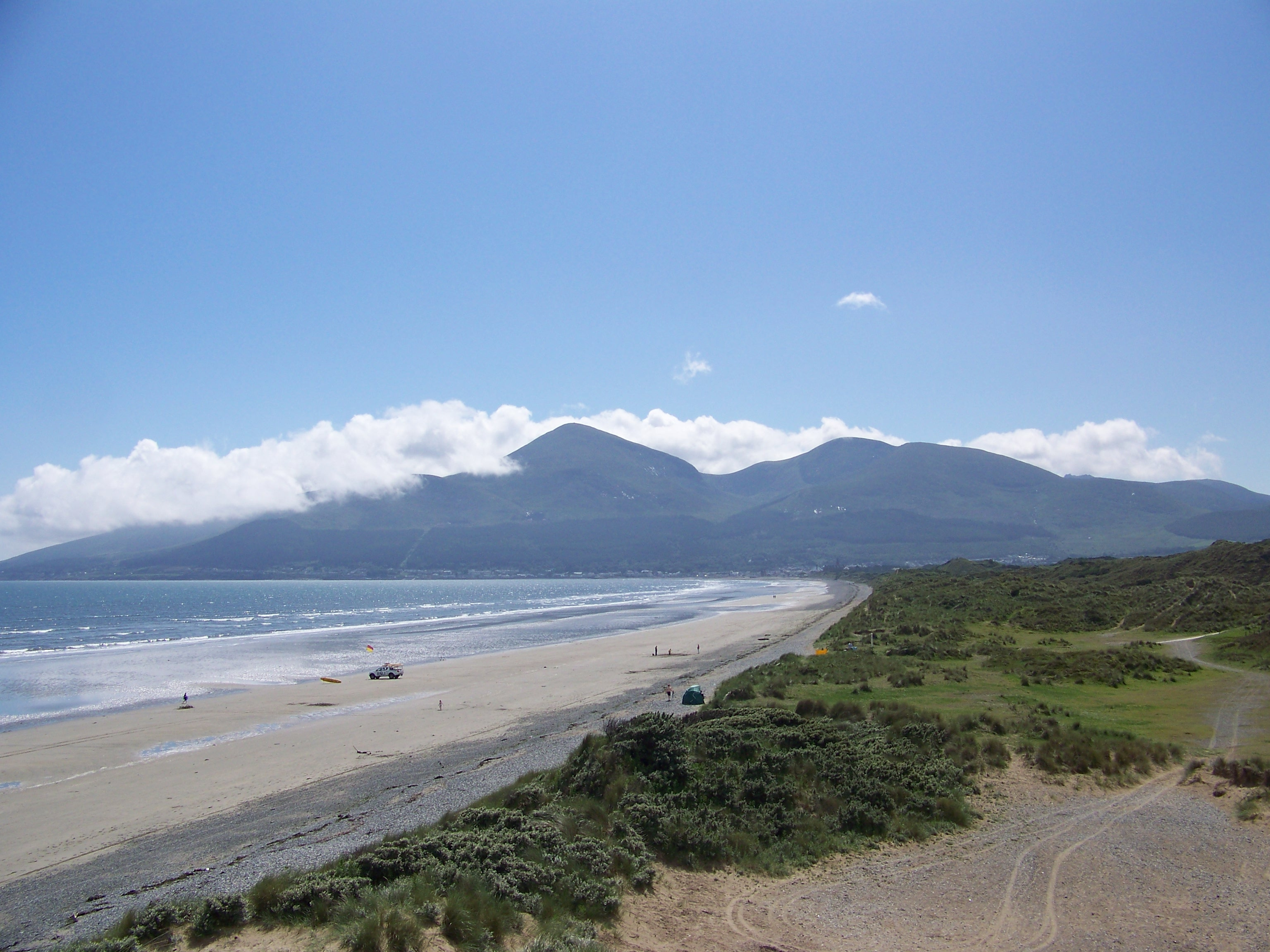
- View of the Mournes from Murlough Nature Reserve

Highest point
- Peak: Slieve Donard
- Elevation: 850 m (2,790 ft)

Geography
- Location within Northern Ireland Location within island of Ireland
- Sovereign state: United Kingdom
- Constituent country: Northern Ireland
- County: County Down
- Range coordinates: 54°9′N 6°3′W

Geology
- Rock type: Granite
- AONB map: Map of the AONB in Northern Ireland

The Mourne Mountains (/mɔːrn/ MORN; Irish: Beanna Boirche), also called the Mournes or the Mountains of Mourne, are a predominantly granite mountain range in County Down in the south-east of Northern Ireland. They include the highest mountain in all of Ulster, Slieve Donard at 850 m (2,790 ft). The Mournes are designated an Area of Outstanding Natural Beauty and it has been proposed to make the area Northern Ireland's first national park. The area is partly owned by the National Trust and sees over 50,000 visitors every year. The Mourne Wall crosses fifteen of the summits and was built to enclose the catchment basin of the Silent Valley and Ben Crom reservoirs. The wall, and the area inside it, are owned by Northern Ireland Water.

== Name ==
The name 'Mourne' is derived from the name of a Gaelic clan or sept called the Múghdhorna. The older name of this mountainous territory was Bairrche, which is likely a collective noun derived from the Irish barr, meaning 'top, peak'. This survives in the Irish name for the mountains, Na Beanna Boirche, literally "the peaks of the peak district". It was historically anglicized as 'Bennyborfy'. The name Bairche or Boirche was also personified as the mythical shepherd of the mountains.

Many of the mountains have names beginning "Slieve", from the Irish sliabh, meaning "mountain". While all Irish dialects and many Hiberno-English speakers pronounce this word with an sh sound, this is commonly dropped in English as spoken in the region and rarely reflected in anglicised spellings.

== Mountains ==
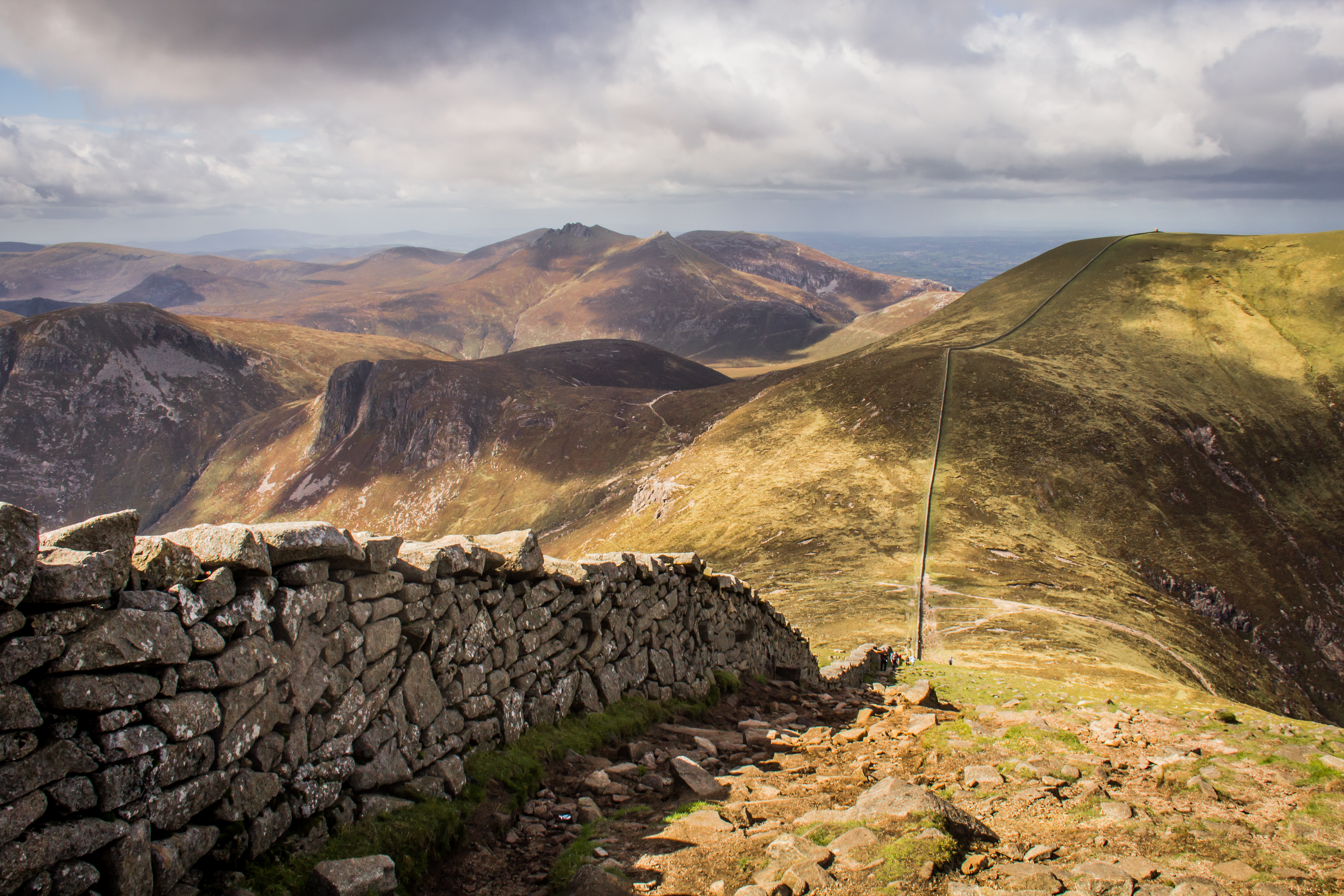
The Mourne Wall on Slieve Donard, looking west

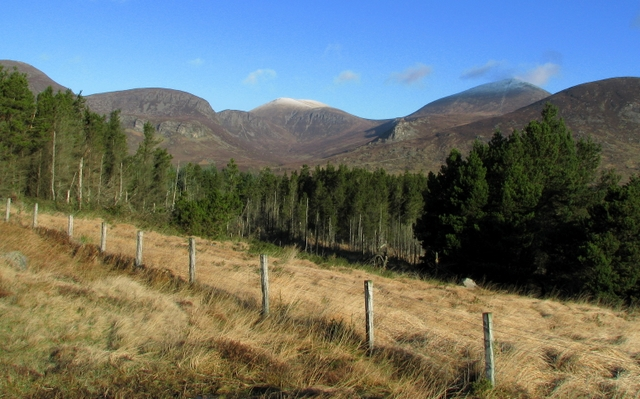
The eastern Mournes seen from Annalong Wood

On clear days, the Mourne Mountains can be seen from the Isle of Man and Dublin.

Highest summits (MountainViews Online Database (Note: MountainViews was created in 2002 by Simon Stewart as a non–profit online database for climbers in Ireland to document and catalogue their Irish climbs. Its main data feed is taken from the Ordnance Survey Ireland ("OSI"). However, it also integrates other established Irish mountain databases such as the Paul Tempan Loganim Irish Placenames Database. Collins Press published its Online Datase in 2013 in the book: A Guide to Ireland's Mountain Summits: The Vandeleur-Lynams & the Arderins. MountainViews is also partnered with the important Database of British and Irish Hills ("DoBIH"), which is the main live database for the categorisation of mountains and hills in the British Isles.))
Rank	Name	Irish name	Elevation (Note: 'Elevation' is the vertical height of the summit above average sea level.)	Prominence (Note: 'Topographic prominence' is the height of the summit above the lowest point on the terrain surrounding it.)
1	Slieve Donard; Highest in Ulster	Sliabh Dónairt ("Domhanghart's mountain")	850 m (2,790 ft)	822 m (2,697 ft)
2	Slieve Commedagh	Sliabh Coimhéideach ("guarding/watching mountain")	767 m (2,516 ft)	180 m (590 ft)
3	Slieve Binnian	Sliabh Binneáin ("mountain of the little peaks")	746 m (2,448 ft)	282 m (925 ft)
4	Slieve Bearnagh	Sliabh Bearnach ("gapped mountain")	739 m (2,425 ft)	304 m (997 ft)
5	Slieve Lamagan	Sliabh Lámhagáin ("crawling/creeping mountain")	704 m (2,310 ft)	197 m (646 ft)
6	Slieve Meelbeg	Sliabh Míol Beag ("small mountain of the beasts")	702 m (2,303 ft)	193 m (633 ft)
7	Slieve Meelmore	Sliabh Míol Mór ("great mountain of the beasts")	680 m (2,230 ft)	109 m (358 ft)
8	Slieve Bearnagh North Tor	—	680 m (2,230 ft)	10 m (33 ft)
9	Slieve Binnian North Top	—	678 m (2,224 ft)	53 m (174 ft)
10	Slieve Muck	Sliabh Muc ("pig mountain")	670 m (2,200 ft)	155 m (509 ft)
11	Chimney Rock Mtn/Slieve Neir	Sliabh an Aoire ("shepherd mountain")	656 m (2,152 ft)	131 m (430 ft)
12	Cove Mountain	—	655 m (2,149 ft)	100 m (330 ft)
13	Slieve Corragh	Sliabh Corrach ("rugged/pointed mountain")	640 m (2,100 ft)	15 m (49 ft)
14	Eagle Mountain	Sliabh an Iolair ("eagle mountain")	638 m (2,093 ft)	263 m (863 ft)
15	Shanlieve	Seanshliabh ("old mountain")	626 m (2,054 ft)	31 m (102 ft)
16	Slieve Loughshannagh	Sliabh Loch Seannach ("fox lake mountain")	617 m (2,024 ft)	104 m (341 ft)
17	Slieve Beg	Sliabh Beag ("little mountain")	596 m (1,955 ft)	41 m (135 ft)
18	Doan	Dún Maol Chobha ("Maol Cobha's fort")	593 m (1,946 ft)	119 m (390 ft)
19	Slievenaglogh (Northern)	Sliabh na gCloch ("mountain of the stones")	586 m (1,923 ft)	41 m (135 ft)
20	Carn Mountain	Sliabh an Chairn ("mountain of the cairn")	585 m (1,919 ft)	50 m (160 ft)
21	Finlieve	Finnshliabh ("white mountain")	579 m (1,900 ft)	20 m (66 ft)
22	Slievemoughanmore	—	560 m (1,840 ft)	154 m (505 ft)
23	Crossone (lesser summit of Slieve Donard)	Cros Eoghain ("Owen's cross")	540 m (1,770 ft)	12 m (39 ft)
24	Pigeon Rock Mtn/Drumlee	Droim Lao ("ridge of the calf")	534 m (1,752 ft)	139 m (456 ft)
25	Ott Mountain	Ucht ("mountain-breast")	527 m (1,729 ft)	32 m (105 ft)
26	Ben Crom	Binn Chrom ("stooped/curved peak/cliff")	526 m (1,726 ft)	81 m (266 ft)
27	Rocky Mountain (Eastern)	Sliabh na gCloch ("mountain of the stones")	524 m (1,719 ft)	60 m (200 ft)
28	Spences Mountain (lesser summit of Slieve Neir)	—	515 m (1,690 ft)	Unknown
29	Cock Mountain/Slievahilly	Sliabh an Choiligh ("cock mountain")	504 m (1,654 ft)	130 m (430 ft)
30	Butter Mountain	Sliabh an Ime ("butter mountain")	500 m (1,600 ft)	95 m (312 ft)

Lesser summits and hills
Rank	Name	Irish name	Translation	Height
31	Slievemartin	Sliabh Mártain	Martin's mountain	485 m (1,591 ft)
32	Spaltha	Unknown	Unknown	479 m (1,572 ft)
33	Thomas Mountain	Unknown	Unknown	475 m (1,558 ft)
34	Tievedockaragh	Taobh Docrach	difficult hillside	473 m (1,552 ft)
35	Spelga	Speilgeach	place of pointed rocks	472 m (1,549 ft)
36	Slievemeen	Sliabh Mín	smooth mountain	471 m (1,545 ft)
37	Pierces Castle	Unknown	Unknown	465 m (1,526 ft)
38	Crenville	Unknown	Unknown	460 m (1,510 ft)
39	Millstone Mountain	Unknown	Unknown	459 m (1,506 ft)
40	Wee Binnian	Broinn Bhinneáin	breast of (Slieve) Binnian	459 m (1,506 ft)
41	Slievenagarragh	Unknown	Unknown	450 m (1,480 ft)
42	Slievenamaddy	Sliabh na Madaidh	dog mountain	450 m (1,480 ft)
43	Altaggart Mountain	Alt an tSagairt	Hill of the Priest	445 m (1,460 ft)
44	Slievenaglogh (Southern)	Sliabh na gCloch	mountain of the stones	445 m (1,460 ft)
45	Slievenamiskan	Sliabh Meascáin	butter lump mountain	444 m (1,457 ft)
46	Slievenabrock	Sliabh na mBroc	badger mountain	438 m (1,437 ft)
47	Hares Gap	Unknown	Unknown	435 m (1,427 ft)
48	Hares Castle	Unknown	Unknown	430 m (1,410 ft)
49	Wee Slievemoughan	Unknown	Unknown	428 m (1,404 ft)
50	Slievedermot	Sliabh Diarmuid	Dermot's mountain	425 m (1,394 ft)
51	Slievemeel	Sliabh Maol	bald mountain	420 m (1,380 ft)
52	Leganabruchan	Unknown	Unknown	410 m (1,350 ft)
53	Craigdoo	Creag Dubh	black rock	408 m (1,339 ft)
54	Rocky Mountain (Western)	Unknown	Unknown	405 m (1,329 ft)
55	Slieve Ban	Sliabh Bán	white mountain	395 m (1,296 ft)
56	Windy Gap	Unknown	Unknown	395 m (1,296 ft)
57	Lukes Mountain	Unknown	Unknown	391 m (1,283 ft)
58	Slievebane	Unknown	Unknown	390 m (1,280 ft)
59	Tornamrock	Torr na mBroc	Torr of the Badgers	390 m (1,280 ft)
60	Slievenamuck	Sliabh na Muc	Mountain of the Pigs	390 m (1,280 ft)
61	Gruggandoo	Grugán Dubh	Black Ridge	380 m (1,250 ft)
62	Black Stairs	Unknown	Unknown	370 m (1,210 ft)
63	Deers Meadow	Unknown	Unknown	370 m (1,210 ft)
64	Carnadranna	Unknown	Unknown	365 m (1,198 ft)
65	Slieve Roe	Sliabh Ruadh	red mountain	364 m (1,194 ft)
66	Slieve Roosley	Unknown	Unknown	362 m (1,188 ft)
67	Hen Mountain/Slievenakirk	Sliabh na Circe	hen mountain	360 m (1,180 ft)
68	Trainors Rocks	Unknown	Unknown	360 m (1,180 ft)
69	Lugagour	Unknown	Unknown	360 m (1,180 ft)
70	Leckan More	Leacán Mór	Big slab	355 m (1,165 ft)
71	Percy Bysshe	Unknown	Unknown	355 m (1,165 ft)
72	Crannoge	Unknown	Unknown	350 m (1,150 ft)
73	The Fallow	Unknown	Unknown	350 m (1,150 ft)
74	Crotlieve	Crotshliabh	hump-mountain	347 m (1,138 ft)
75	Knockshee	Cnoc Sidhe	fairy hill	346 m (1,135 ft)
76	Long Seefin	Suidhe Finn	Finn's seat	345 m (1,132 ft)
77	Glen Fofanny	Unknown	Unknown	340 m (1,120 ft)
78	Slievenagore	Unknown	Unknown	335 m (1,099 ft)
79	Moolieve	Unknown	Unknown	332 m (1,089 ft)
80	Mullagharve	Mullach Garbh	Rough Hilltop	330 m (1,080 ft)
81	Slievenaman	Sliabh na mBan	Mountain of the Women	323 m (1,060 ft)
82	Ardglash	Unknown	Unknown	320 m (1,050 ft)
83	Wee Roosley	Unknown	Unknown	320 m (1,050 ft)
84	Slievemageogh	Unknown	Unknown	316 m (1,037 ft)
85	Slievemiskan	Sliabh Meascáin	Lump Mountain	310 m (1,020 ft)
86	Carmeen	Unknown	Unknown	310 m (1,020 ft)
87	Grugganskeagh	Grugán Sceiche	Bramble Ridge	310 m (1,020 ft)
88	Knockchree	Unknown	Unknown	305 m (1,001 ft)

== Other features ==
The below sub-headings detail other features and visitor attractions found in the Mourne Mountains.

=== The Mourne Wall ===
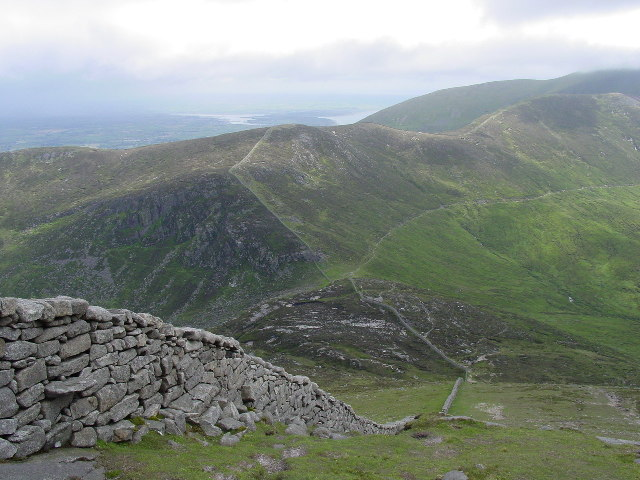
Mourne Wall on Slieve Bearnagh

The Mourne Wall is a dry stone wall measuring 31.4 km (19.5 miles) in length that crosses fifteen summits and was constructed to define and protect the 36 km^{2} (8,900-acre) catchment area purchased by Belfast Water Commissioners in the late 19th century. This followed a number of Acts of Parliament allowing the sale, and the establishment of a water supply from the Mournes to the growing industrial city of Belfast. Construction of the Mourne Wall was started in 1904 and was completed in 1922.

The Mourne Wall has been a listed building since 1996, and 600 repairs were completed in 2018 by Geda Construction.

=== Forests ===
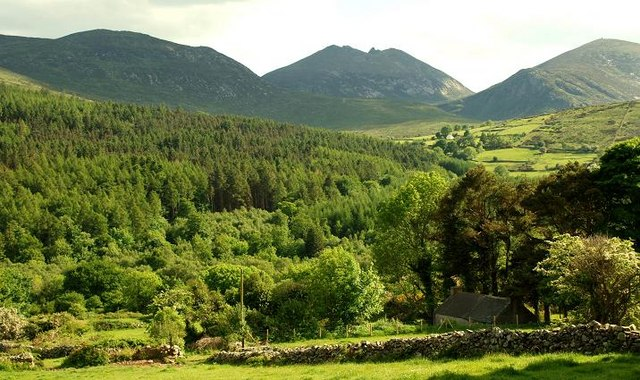
Tollymore forest and the Mournes

Tollymore Forest Park is at Bryansford, near the town of Newcastle in the Mourne and Slieve Croob Area of Outstanding Natural Beauty. It covers an area of 630 hectares (1,600 acres) at the foot of the Mourne Mountains and has views of the surrounding mountains and the sea at nearby Newcastle. The Shimna River flows through the park where it is crossed by 16 bridges, the earliest dating to 1726. The river is a spawning ground for salmon and trout and is an Area of Special Scientific Interest for its geology, flora and fauna. The forest has four walking trails signposted by different coloured arrows, the longest being the 8-mile (13 km) "long haul trail". The Forest Park has been managed by the Forest Service since they purchased it from the Roden Estate in 1941.

Donard Forest is near Newcastle, County Down. It borders Donard Park at the foot of the Mourne Mountains. The Glen River flows through the forest, crossed by three stone bridges.

Rostrevor Forest is near the village of Rostrevor, County Down, between the Mourne Mountains and Carlingford Lough, in the Mourne Area of Outstanding Natural Beauty. The first trees, primarily sitka spruce, douglas fir and pine, were planted in 1931.

=== Reservoirs ===
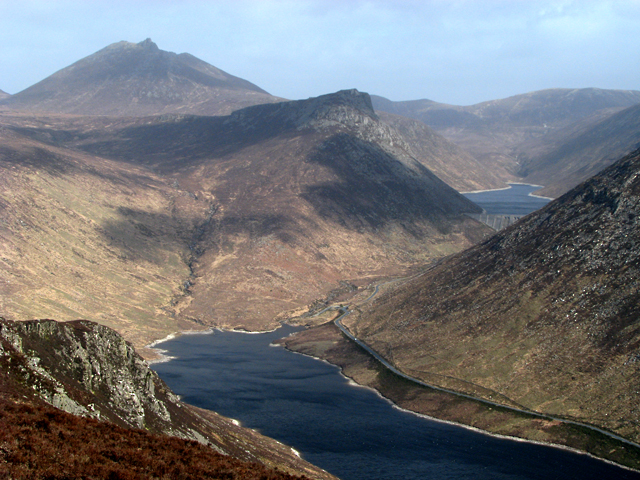
Silent Valley and Ben Crom reservoirs seen from the south

All water reservoirs are owned and maintained by Northern Ireland Water (NIW).

Silent Valley Reservoir is a reservoir in the Mourne Mountains near Kilkeel, County Down. It supplies most of the water for County Down, surrounding counties and most of Belfast via the Aquarius pipeline. The reservoir was built between 1923 and 1933 by a workforce of over one thousand men, nine of whom died during construction. The catchment area is 9,000-acres (3,600 ha / 36 km^{2}).

Ben Crom Reservoir is upstream of Silent Valley in the Kilkeel River valley, and supplies the same areas. It was constructed between 1953 and 1957.

Spelga Reservoir is in the townland of Spelga (Irish: Speilgeach), close to Hilltown, in the North West of the Mourne Mountains. It was formed by construction of Spelga Dam and sits at over 1,200 ft (370 m) above sea level. The dam was constructed between 1953 and 1957, and has a volume of 2,700,000 cubic metres and a catchment area of 1,340-acres (542 ha / 5.423 km^{2}).

Fofanny Dam Reservoir is approximately 2 km north-east of Spelga Dam and is much smaller.

== Flora and fauna ==
Aside from grasses, the most common plants found in the Mournes are heathers and gorse. Of the former, three species are found: cross-leaved heath, bell heather, and common heather. Of the latter, two species are found: common gorse and western gorse. Other plants which grow in the area are: common cottongrass, roseroot, harebell, marsh St John's-wort, wild thyme, wood sorrel and heath spotted orchid.

Sheep graze high into the mountains, and the range is also home to birds, including the raven, peregrine falcon, wren, buzzard, meadow pipit, grey wagtail, stonechat and snipe. The golden eagle, a former inhabitant, has not been seen in the Mournes since 1836.

== Recreation ==
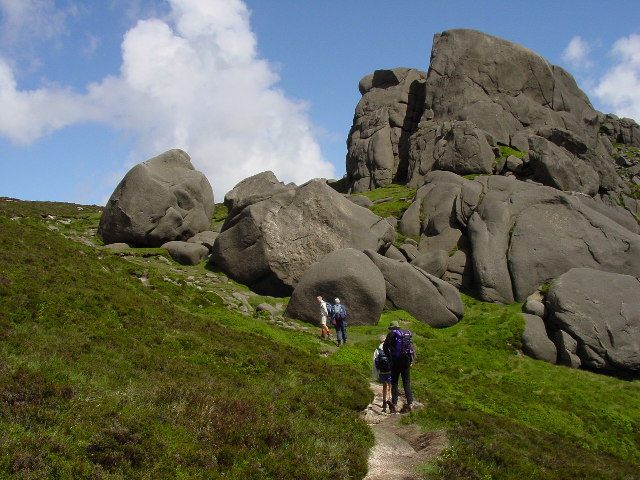
Tors on Slieve Binnian

"Discover Northern Ireland", a website operated by Tourism NI, promotes the Mourne Mountains as a popular destination for hiking and taking in views of the surrounding landscape, including local forests and the coastline. The Mournes offer a range of activities for visitors, including hiking, forest and beach walks, cycling and rock climbing, with nearly three-quarters of visitors choosing the Mournes as a place to go walking and hiking.

The Mournes are a popular destination for Duke of Edinburgh's Award expeditions. However, there are also a number of walking challenges which take place in the Mournes. The Mourne Wall challenge, which is also referred to as the 7-peak challenge because it takes into account 7 of the 10 highest Mourne mountains, is advertised by WalkNI. The Mourne six peak challenge is advertised by DiscoverNI and takes hikers up Slieve Donard, Commedagh, Bearnagh, Slieve Binnian, Slieve Meelmore and Slieve Meelbeg across three days of hiking.

Information and statistics on tourism to the Mournes were gathered by TourismNI in 2014. In a survey of leisure visitors, 79% were found to come from Northern Ireland, 15% from elsewhere in the British Isles or Republic of Ireland, and 5–6% were international visitors. Two-thirds of all visitors made a single-day trip rather staying overnight, and party sizes averaged between 3 and 4 people.

There are many granite cliffs, in the form of outcrops and tors, scattered throughout the range, making the Mournes one of Northern Ireland's major rock-climbing areas since the first recorded ascents in the 1930s. The rockforms are generally quite rounded, thus often requiring cams for protection, but with good friction. The 1998 guidebook lists 26 separate crags, with a total of about 900 routes of all grades.

== Conservation ==
Following a fundraising drive in 1993, the National Trust purchased nearly 5.3 km^{2} (1,300 acres) of land in the Mournes, which included a part of Slieve Donard (at 850 m (2,790 ft)) and nearby Slieve Commedagh (at 767 m (2,516 ft)), the second-highest mountain in the area.

It has been proposed that the Mourne Mountains be made Northern Ireland's first national park. The plan has been subject to controversy because of the area's status as private property, with over 1,000 farmers based in the proposed park, and also because of fears over the impact on local communities, bureaucracy and house prices.

== Gorse burning ==
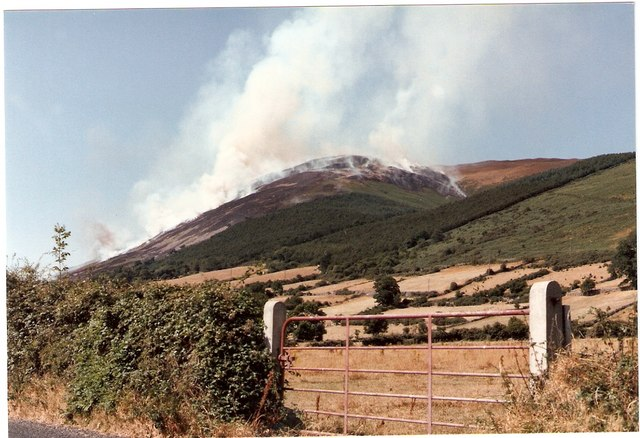
A gorse fire in the Mournes, 1983

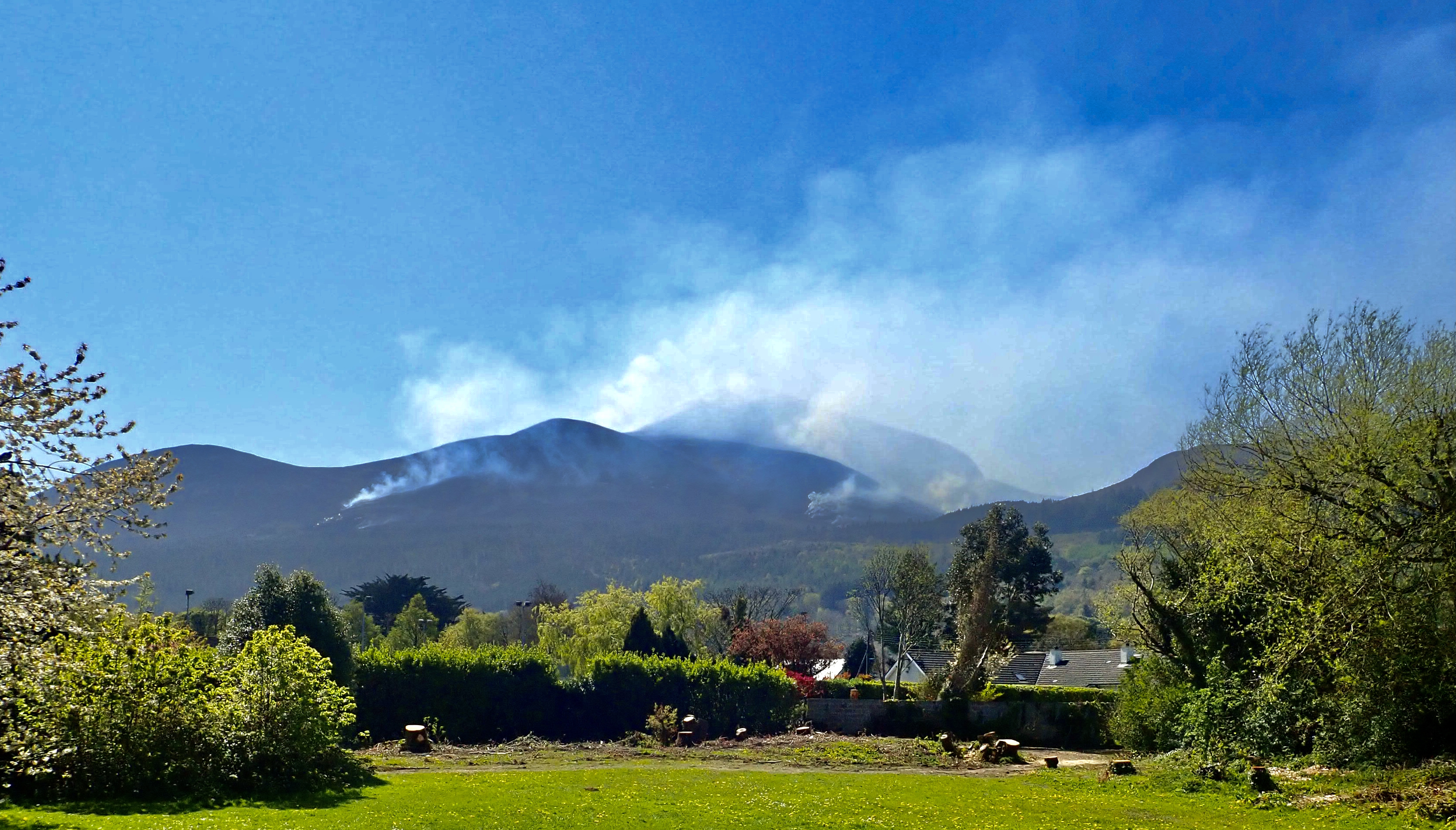
Gorse fires in the Mournes, 2021

There is a tradition in the Mournes of controlled burning of gorse to clear land for sheep to graze. However, many fires are unmanaged and some become out-of-control wildfires. In the 1950s, Emyr Estyn Evans had written that some shepherds in the Mournes tended to burn gorse and heather recklessly. He said that such over-burning "results in widespread destruction" and, along with other mismanagement, had "greatly impoverished the mountain environment". The over-clearing of gorse, heather and trees also heightens the risk of landslides.

In the 21st century there have been hundreds of heather and gorse wildfires in the Mournes each year, the vast majority started deliberately, with "farmers and vandals" often blamed. It is claimed many of the wildfires are caused by sheep farmers and landowners carrying out unapproved burning to clear gorse/heather, to encourage grass growth, and to maximize the subsidy payments they receive for the amount of grazing-land they have. Some are also caused by careless visitors. Under the law, farmers must follow rules when burning gorse and heather: the burning may only be carried out from 1 September until 14 April; they must notify the fire service and have permission to do so; it must be carried out under supervision; and it must be properly controlled with fire breaks.

Most of the fires take place during April and May each year. In April 2021, more than a hundred firefighters tackled a major gorse wildfire in the eastern Mournes, which blazed for three days and caused widespread devastation. These yearly fires destroy habitats, which take decades to recover. They also threaten wildlife and public health, and put excessive pressure on emergency services.

Historically, gorse had many uses in the rural economy and hill farmers often cleared gorse by hand.

== Wind farm proposal ==
In 2015, German-owned company ABO Wind applied to build a wind farm at Gruggandoo in the western Mourne Mountains. Its first two applications were turned down, and its revised application is to build eight turbines standing 142 metres (466 ft) high, along with a network of access tracks, substations and a control building. The turbines would be among the tallest structures in Ireland. The company claims they could power 37% of homes in the district. There is opposition, as the wind farm would be in an Area of Outstanding Natural Beauty and would impact wildlife and habitats. Local protest group, Mourne AONB Against Windfarms, warn it would open the door for further wind farms to be built in the Mournes and other protected areas. Planning officers for Newry, Mourne and Down District Council deem the wind farm "unacceptable" and recommended the council reject it. In 2020, councillors instead voted to ask for a public inquiry.

== Popular culture ==
In the medieval Irish poem Buile Shuibhne, the titular Suibhne spends some time in the mountains to escape society during his madness caused Saint Rónán's curse. This poem was translated in 1983 by Seamus Heaney.

The mountains are immortalised in a song written by Percy French in 1896, "The Mountains of Mourne". The song has been recorded by many artists, including Don McLean, and was quoted in Irish group Thin Lizzy's 1979 song "Roisin Dubh (Black Rose): A Rock Legend".

"The Mountains of Mourne" are also mentioned in John Lennon's song "The Luck of the Irish" on the album Some Time in New York City.

The scenery of the Mourne Mountains have also provided the backdrop for a number of productions, most famously HBO's Game of Thrones.

Many local painters have depicted the mountains, including the same Percy French, who immortalized them in song.

The Mourne Mountains also influenced C. S. Lewis to create the mythical world featured in his The Chronicles of Narnia series.

== Helicopter crash ==
On 23 October 2010 an AgustaWestland AW109 (tail number: N2NR) was operating a VFR flight from Enniskillen Airport to Caernarfon Airport, Wales. While en route the helicopter crashed into the western side of Shanlieve, killing all three passengers and crew on board. The cause of the accident was determined to be pilot error in heavy fog.

== See also ==
- List of mountains in Ireland
- List of tourist attractions in Ireland
