= Northern Ireland Water =

State company operating water services

- Type: Public utility
- Industry: Water industry
- Founded: 1 April 2007
- Headquarters: Westland House, 40 Old Westland Road, Belfast
- Key people: Sara Venning (Chief Executive)
- Website: niwater.com

Northern Ireland Water Limited is the main water company in Northern Ireland.

Formerly an executive agency within the Northern Ireland Executive, it became a government-owned company on 1 April 2007. The company now sits as an Agency within the Department of Infrastructure (DfI). The company provides 575 million litres of clean water a day for almost 1.8 million people as well as treating 340 million litres of wastewater every day, and has approximately 1,300 staff. It is responsible for 27,000 km of watermains and 16,000 km of sewerage mains, as well as 23 water treatment works and 1,030 wastewater treatment works. It cost around £460m each year to deliver water services across Northern Ireland.

== History ==
Prior to 1973, water and sewerage services in Northern Ireland outside Belfast were the responsibility of local councils. Within Belfast, the Belfast City and District Water Commissioners were responsible. In 1974, responsibility for providing these services was transferred to the Department of the Environment (DoE) by the Water and Sewerage Services (Northern Ireland) Order 1973 (SI 1973/70). Within the department, a new Water Executive was responsible for the management and administration of water and sewerage services.

Whilst water and sewer companies were privatised in England and Wales in 1989, these services remained public in Northern Ireland.

In 1996, the Water Executive became an executive agency and was rebranded as the Northern Ireland Water Service and, in 1999, responsibility for water was transferred back to the Department of the Environment by the Water (Northern Ireland) Order 1999 (SI 1999/662).

For decades there has been an erroneous belief that domestic water and sewer services in Northern Ireland have been provided without charges to customers. Prior to 1974, domestic users were charged for water usage based on a percentile of the domestic rates. Subsequent to this, the costs for water usage were assimilated into the domestic rate payable by households. Since that time only non-residential customers received water bills and had water meters. However, in December 2002 it was announced that Northern Ireland's water and sewerage services would become self-financing. This was followed by two years of extensive consultations on water reforms, with the aim of introducing meters for new houses as well as water and sewer charges for all domestic customers. The announcement of the establishment of a state-owned company was made by Minister of State John Spellar in August 2004. The water charges plan was included in the Water and Sewerage Services (Northern Ireland) Order 2006 (SI 2006/3336), introduced by Peter Hain, the then Secretary of State for Northern Ireland. In parallel, Northern Ireland Water Limited was created in April 2007. An anti-water charges campaign in 2007 resulted in the plans for water charges to be abandoned. Later, all major parties in Northern Ireland claimed to have had a leading role in the anti-water charges movement.

In 2007, a system of economic regulation had been set up similar to the existing system in England and Wales, where Ofwat regulates the water sector. The Northern Ireland Authority for Utility Regulation was appointed to carry out this role. Performance benchmarking by the regulator showed that there was a "performance gap" with England and Wales concerning drinking water quality, wastewater quality, leakage, customer service and efficiency. This gap has now been more than halved. April 2017 marked the company's first 10 years, in 2016/17 the company reported record levels of wastewater compliance, with water quality compliance remaining at near record levels.

== Structure ==
NI Water is a government-owned company (GoCo) – which is a statutory trading body owned by central government but operating under company legislation. This means that the company's corporate governance structure and compliance is with the Companies Act 2006 and the principles of good corporate governance as set out in the UK Corporate Governance Code, where appropriate.

== Major reservoirs and treatment works ==
- Silent Valley Reservoir
- Lough Neagh
- Ben Crom Reservoir
- Spelga Dam and Reservoir
- Dunore Point
- Drumaroad Water Treatment Works, built as part of the Aquarius Mourne Water Project

== See also ==
- List of Northern Ireland ministers, government departments and executive agencies
