= Pete McGrath =

Irish Gaelic footballer and manager (born 1953)

Peter McGrath
Personal information
- Born: County Down, Northern Ireland
- Occupation: Teacher

Sport
- Sport: Gaelic football
Club management
- Years: Club
- Rostrevor
| | 1 Player | 0 | 0 |
Inter-county management
- Years: Team
- 1989-2002 2014-2017: Down; Fermanagh
Inter-county titles as manager
| County | League | Province | All-Ireland |
| Down | 3 | 6 | 6 |

Peter McGrath (born 6 June 1953), from Rostrevor, County Down, is an Irish former Gaelic footballer and current manager. He managed the Down senior football team to the All-Ireland titles in 1991 and 1994.

== Professional career ==
McGrath was employed for almost thirty years as a physical education teacher at St Colman's College, Newry. He retired from this position in 2006.

== Playing career ==
McGrath played at all grades for Rostrevor GAC, including togging out for the first team aged only 15, and represented St Colman's at all levels of schools' competition; he also played for Down Minors. McGrath captained the first Queen's University team to win the All-Ireland Freshers title by defeating UCD 2-16 to 0-6 in Dundalk in March 1973.

== Management career ==
In 1987 McGrath was in charge of the Down team that won the All-Ireland Minor Football Championship. He managed the Down senior team between 1989 and 2002 and was at the helm when Down won the Ulster and All Ireland Senior Championships in 1991 and 1994. He managed the Ireland team in the International Rules Series in 2004 and 2005.

McGrath managed the Down U-21 team to the All Ireland final in 2009, before stepping down in October 2009.

McGrath has had spells in club management with Cooley Kickhams, An Riocht and Bryansford. He also coached the Gaelic football teams at St Colman's College, guiding them to five Hogan Cup wins between 1975 and 1998.

In October 2010, he returned to county management after being named as the Down minor manager on a three-year term, his second time in charge of the team.

He was twice manager of the Fermanagh Senior Football team and took the team to the All-Ireland quarter-final in 2015 after having gained promotion to Division Two of the National Football League for 2016.

He managed the Louth senior football team in 2018 but resigned after ten months into a two-year term following a shock Championship defeat to Leitrim.

He managed his native club St Bronaghʼs GAA in Rostrevor, for three years having taken over for the 2019 season, the club's centenary year. He remains in charge of the club's minor team.

McGrath was appointed manager of Antrim GAA club Aghagallon in March 2023.

== Honours ==
Player

- 1 Down Senior Football Championship 1976
- 1 All-Ireland Higher Education Freshers Title (QUB, 1972–73)

Manager

Ireland

- 1 Compromise Rules Series 2004

Ulster

- 1 Interprovincial 2016

Down

- 4 Dr McKenna Cup 1989, 1992, 1996, 1998
- 2 All-Ireland Senior Football Championship 1991, 1994
- 2 Ulster Senior Football Championship 1991, 1994
- 2 Ulster Under-21 Football Championship 2008, 2009
- 1 All-Ireland Minor Football Championship 1987
- 2 Ulster Minor Football Championship 1986 1987
- 1 National Football League Division 3 1997

Club

- 1 Down Senior League Football Division 1 2007
- 1 Louth League Division 1 2004
- 1 Down Under-21 Football Championship 2012
- 1 Ulster U21 Championship 2013 (with Bryansford)

School

- 4 Hogan Cup 1986, 1988, 1993, 1998 (with Ray Morgan)
- 6 McCrory Cup 1978, 1979, 1981,1988 1993 1998 (with Ray Morgan)

Sporting positions
| Preceded by Jackie McManus | Down Senior Football manager 1989-2002 | Succeeded by Paddy O'Rourke |
