= Brónach =

6th century Irish saint

Saint Brónach
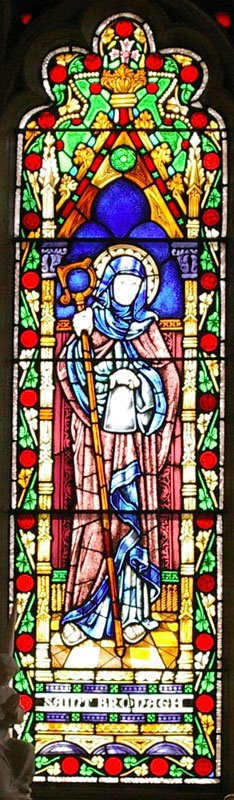
- Major shrine: Kilbroney (Irish: Cell Brónche)
- Feast: 2 April

Saint Brónach (sometimes anglicised to Bronagh) was a 6th-century holy woman from Ireland, the reputed founder and patron saint of Cell Brónche ("church of Brónach"), now Kilbroney, in County Down, Northern Ireland.

== Life ==
A disciple of Saint Patrick, Brónach built a refuge for sailors who were shipwrecked in Carlingford Lough. The ringing of Bronach’s bell warned of a rising storm on the dangerous waters of the Lough. About 150 years ago a storm brought down a large old oak tree in the Kilbroney churchyard, and in its branches was found a 10th-century bell. The bell is now in the local church in Rostrevor.

Lying in Glenn Sechis, a mountain valley in County Down (near Rostrevor), Cell Brónche lay at some distance from the major political centres of the region. It may have been a nunnery in origin, but later came to serve as a pastoral church run by nuns as well as one or several priests. It was chosen as the parish church of Glenn Sechis. A high cross which survives among the ruins of Cell Brónche attests to the importance of her church. It is made of Mourne granite and stands over the traditional site of her grave in the old cemetery. It is part of the "Saint Patrick’s Trail". The building suffered damage during the 1641 Rebellion, as well as in Cromwellian times.

According to the genealogies of the saints, Brónach is the mother of Saint Mo Chóe of Nendrum and herself a daughter of Míliucc maccu Buain. In the Irish martyrologies (O'Clery, Martyrology of Tallaght, note added to Félire Óengusso), her feast day is 2 April.

== Legacy ==
There is a stained glass window depicting Bronach in All Saints Church, Ballymena.

Several places in Rostrevor are named in tribute to Brónach, referencing either Bronagh or Kilbroney. These include the local GAA club St Bronaghʼs GAA, Kilbroney Park, Kilbroney Integrated Primary School, St. Bronagh’s Primary School, and Kilbroney Road.
