= Rostrevor Forest =

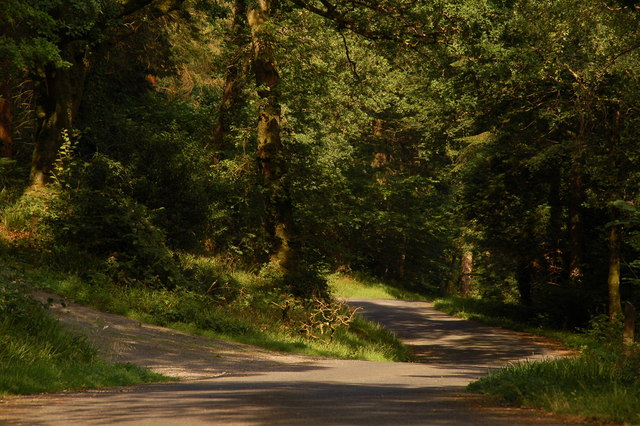

- Location within Northern Ireland
- Interactive map of Rostrevor Forest

Geography
- Location: Down, Northern Ireland, United Kingdom
- Coordinates: 54°05′42″N 6°11′17″W
- Area: 1,700 hectares (4,200 acres)

Administration
- Established: 1931
- Authority: Forest Service Northern Ireland

Ecology
- Forest cover: 1,000 hectares (2,500 acres) (Approx. 59%)
- Dominant tree species: sitka spruce, douglas fir and pine

Rostrevor Forest is located near the village of Rostrevor, County Down, Northern Ireland. It lies between the Mourne Mountains and Carlingford Lough, in the Mourne Area of Outstanding Natural Beauty. The first trees, primarily sitka spruce, douglas fir and pine, were planted in 1931. The Forest Service carries out felling in the forest and replants trees with wildlife conservation in mind. Animal species found in the forest include red and grey squirrels, foxes, badgers, jays and sparrow hawks.

== Features ==
A 40-tonne granite boulder, known as the Cloughmore Stone or The Big Stone, is located on the top of a 1,000-foot (300 m) hill within the forest. It was deposited there approximately 10,000 years ago when the glacial ice sheet receded. The local legend states that the stone was thrown across Carlingford Lough from the top of the Cooley Mountains, by the giant Fionn mac Cumhaill.

Rostrevor Oakwood is a 40-acre (16 ha) area of 250-year-old oak trees within the forest. They are the remains of the oak woods that were present on the lower Mourne mountains until it was mostly felled for use in boat building in the 18th and 19th centuries. The area is protected as a Special Area of Conservation. A clearing on the southern edge of the oakwood is known as Fiddler's Green and was at one time a gathering point in the village and would have featured various forms of entertainment. Every July since 1986, the village has hosted a traditional music festival named the Fiddler’s Green Festival.

One of the trees in the oakwood, was omitted from an environmental survey for nearby construction work and threatened with damage. The oak subsequently became known as the Invisible Tree and was voted Northern Ireland's Tree of the Year for 2019.

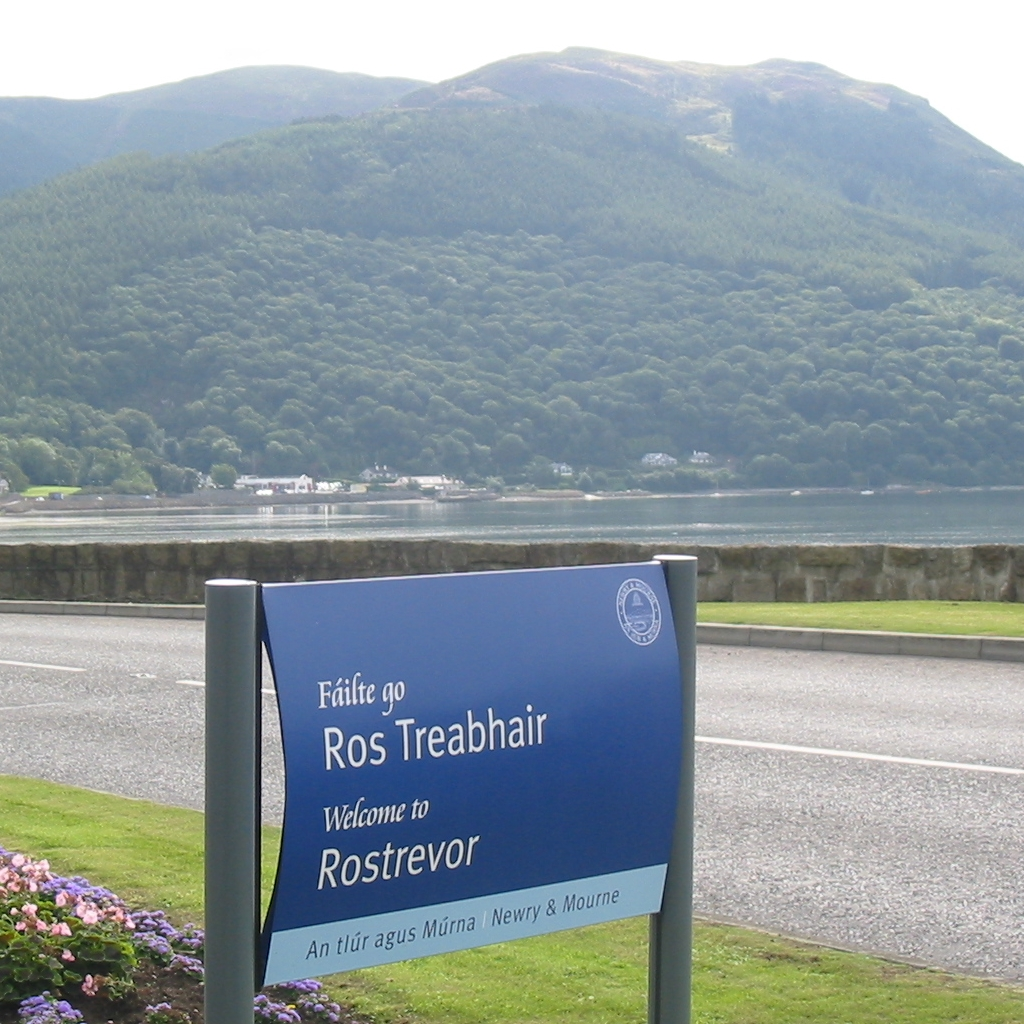
Rostrevor Forest from the west end of Rostrevor

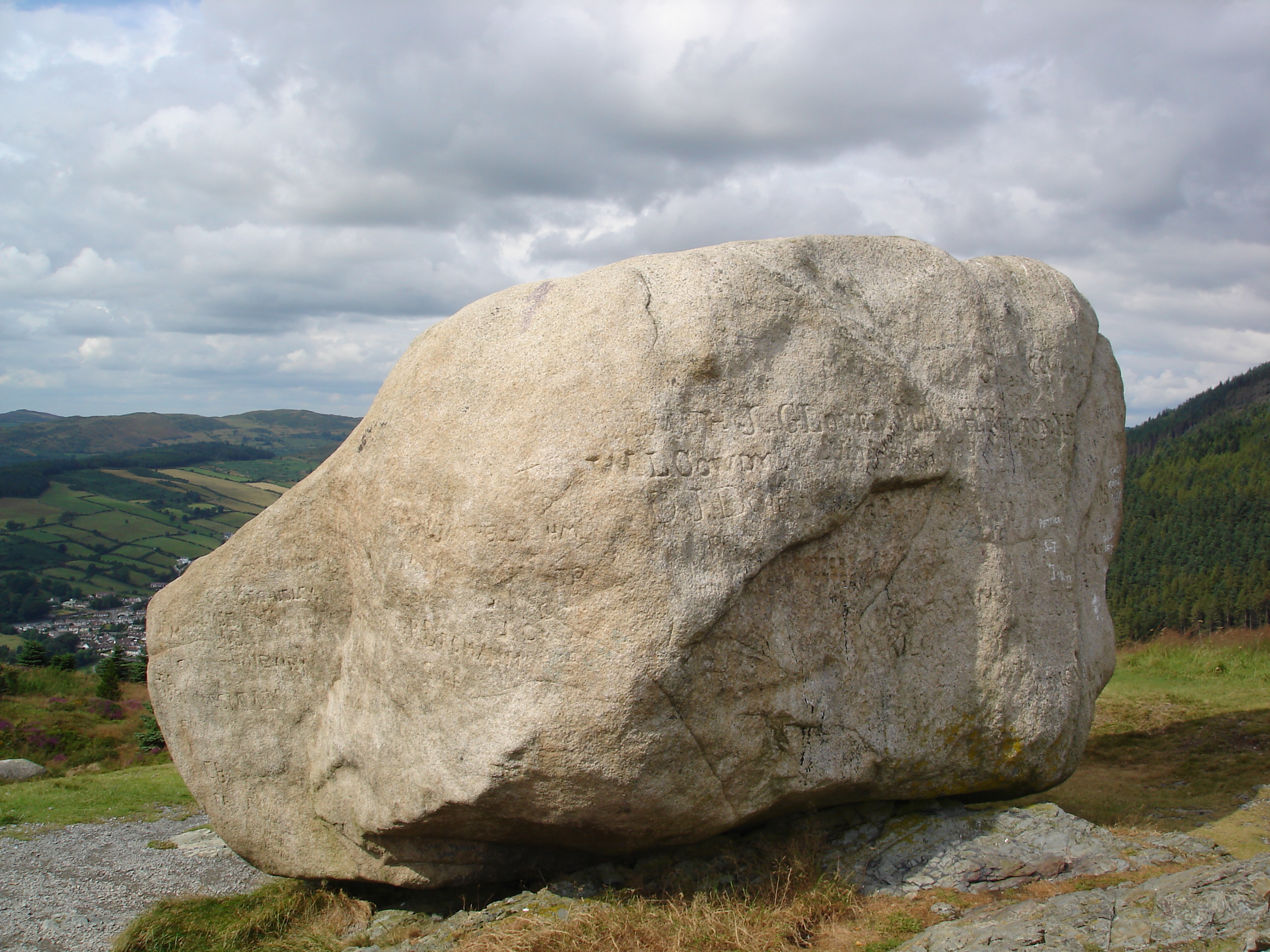
Cloughmore Stone
