= St Bronaghʼs GAA =

Irish sports club

St Bronagh's GAA
- Cumann Naomh Brónach
- Founded: 1919
- County: Down
- Nickname: The Reds
- Colours: Red and Black
- Grounds: Pettit Park, Rostrevor
- Coordinates: 54°06′21.8″N 6°12′11.1″W

Playing kits
Standard colours

Senior Club Championships
	All Ireland	Ulster champions	Down champions
Football:	-	-	2

St Bronagh's GAA (Irish: Cumann Naomh Brónach) is a Gaelic Athletic Association club based in Rostrevor, County Down, Northern Ireland. The club is sometimes referred to as Rostrevor GAA. The club serves as the local hub for Gaelic games in the area, offering participation opportunities for both men and women across all age groups—from under-6s to senior levels—as well as involvement in cultural activities such as Scór.

== History ==
St Bronagh's GAA was founded in 1919. The club is named after Saint Brónach, a 6th-century Irish saint revered as the founder and patron of the church at Kilbroney near Rostrevor. The club's senior men's side won the Down Senior Football Championship in 1976 and 1998, and has been a runner-up several times, most recently in 2002.

The club’s senior ladies team first found success in 2007 intermediate championship, earning the clubs first senior women’s cup. Since then the ladies team were runner-ups in the intermediate championship in 2017 and 2018 losing out to Saval and Kilcoo respectively, until they tasted success in 2019 where they defeated Burren (1:10 - 1:08). They then again won the intermediate championship in 2023 defeating St John’s Drumnaquoile, and were narrowly beaten by Glenavy GAC (Antrim) at the first round of Ulster, Cristin Brown receiving an Irish News Ulster All Star nomination for the season. Most recently in 2025 the ladies team reached the senior championship semi-final, marking a first in the clubs history.

At the underage level, the club has achieved considerable success, winning the Down Minor Boys' Football Championship in 2003, 2004, 2005, 2007, and 2013. Seven players from the club represented the county on the All-Ireland winning Down Minors Boys team of 2005. The underage ladies have also achieved notable success, the minor ladies winning the Down Minor B Football Championship in 2019 defeating Bryansford, while most recently in 2025 they were narrowly beaten beaten by Bryansford in the Down Minor D Football Championship Final.

A number of the club's Senior Ladies panel have been involved with the Down county Ladies' football team. When Down won the All-Ireland Intermediate Ladies' Football Championship title in 2014, the panel included club players Katie Farrell, Clara Mulvenna and Emma McPolin. In 2021, the Down team won an Ulster Intermediate Final, with club players Clara Mulvenna, Annamarie Magee, Cristin Brown and Niamh Scullion on the panel, and then again in 2024 with members Clara Mulvenna, Niamh Scullion and Niamh Rice on the panel.

== Grounds and facilities ==
Home games and training sessions are held at Pettit Park in Rostrevor. The club also operates a social club and hosts activities, including cultural events and gala functions.

== Community and cultural activities ==
Activities extend beyond sport—these include participation in Scór, health and wellbeing initiatives, youth programmes, and hosting local events. The social club serves as one of the music venues for the Fiddler's Green International Festival.

== Honours ==
- Down Senior Men’s Football Championship: 2

1976, 1998

- Down Intermediate Football Championship: 2

2017, 2026

- Down Senior Men’s Football Division One: 1

2005

- Down Senior Men’s Football Division Two: 4

1967, 1996, 2012, 2026

- Down Senior Ladies Intermediate Championship: 3

2007, 2019, 2023

- Ulster Minor Football Championship: 1

2004

- Down Minor Football Championship: 7

1992, 2003, 2004, 2005, 2007, 2013, 2015

- Ulster Scór Sinsear Champions: 1

Ballad Group 1978

- Ulster Scór na nÓg Champions: 2

Novelty Act 2004, 2012

- Down Scór Sinsear Champions: 21

Ballad Group (10) - 1971, 1977, 1978, 1979, 1980, 1981, 1983, 2010, 2012, 2013
Novelty Act (3) - 2005, 2011, 2019
Set Dancing (3) - 1977, 1978, 1979
Recitation (2) - 2024 (Michael McNally), 2025 (Kieran McNally)
Solo Singing (2) - 2009 (James Brennan), 2013 (Anne-Marie Mulholland)
Ceili Dancing (1) - 1977

- Down Scór na nÓg Champions: 21

Novelty Act (16) - 1989, 1990, 1995, 2000, 2001, 2002, 2003 2004, 2005, 2007, 2008, 2010, 2012, 2013, 2014, 2016
Ballad Group (2) - 1978, 1999
Recitation (2) - 2010 (Michael McNally), 2014 (Michael McNally)
Solo Singing (1) - 2009 (Anne-Marie Mulholland)

== Notable people ==
- Pete McGrath, who managed the club during its centenary in 2019 and previously guided Down to All-Ireland victories in 1991 and 1994.
- Craig Lynch - the former Louth goalkeeper joined Rostrevor in 2025.
