= Haulbowline Lighthouse =

Lighthouse in County Down, Northern Ireland

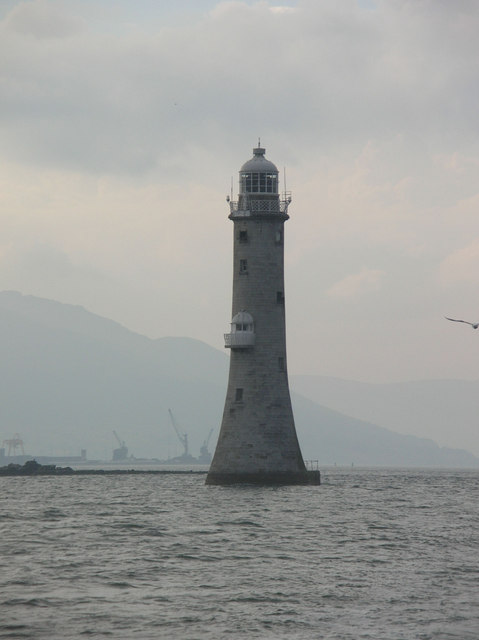
- Haulbowline in 2006
- Location: Carlingford Lough; County Down; Northern Ireland
- Coordinates: 54.019948°N 6.078938°W

Tower
- Constructed: 1824
- Construction: stone
- Automated: 1965
- Height: 34 metres (112 ft)
- Shape: tapered tower
- Markings: unpainted tower, white lantern
- Operator: Commissioners of Irish Lights
- Heritage: Grade B+ listed building

Light
- Focal height: 32 metres (105 ft)
- Lens: PRB22
- Range: 10 nautical miles (19 km; 12 mi)
- Characteristic: Fl (3) W 10s.
- Northern Ireland no.: CIL-1020

Listed Building – Grade B+
- Designated: 27 September 2002
- Reference no.: HB16/04/009

The Haulbowline Lighthouse is an active 19th century lighthouse. Described as an "elegant, tapering stone tower" it is located at the entrance to Carlingford Lough, near Cranfield Point in County Down, the southernmost point of Northern Ireland. The lighthouse was built on the eastern part of the Haulbowline rocks, one of a number of navigation hazards at the seaward end of Carlingford Lough, which include a notable rocky shoal or bar across the mouth of the lough. The multi-purpose light was designed to help mark the rocks and, when first built, the depth of water over the bar, as well as acting as a landfall light for ships entering from the Irish Sea. Associated with the lighthouse are the leading lights at Green Island and Vidal Bank which mark the safe channel along Carlingford Lough, with Haulbowline displaying a reserve light in case of problems with these leading lights.

== History ==
Completed in 1824, the lighthouse was designed by George Halpin following complaints made to the Ballast Board, the predecessor organisation of the Commissioners of Irish Lights that the existing shore-based Cranfield Point Lighthouse was inadequate in marking both the channel and the treacherous rocks at the lough entrance, many of which were only revealed at low tide. The poorly positioned light at Cranfield Point, had also been built too close to the eroding coastline, and in 1860 it finally succumbed to the sea, and collapsed onto the beach. The keeper's cottages which survived, were subsequently used by the staff and families of Haulbowline until 1922, when new houses were constructed nearby in Greencastle.

Construction of the 34-metre-high (112 ft) stone tower has been described as "a remarkable achievement at the time", given the location "on a semi-submerged rock with fast currents running around it". Originally white in colour, the paint was removed in 1946 to reveal the stone beneath. The principal light is displayed 32m above sea level as a constant white light. A secondary light was also displayed on a balcony facing the sea, known as a half-tide light, this was lit when the state of the tide was such that there would be enough depth for ships to pass into the lough, and until 1922 a black ball was also raised on a mast above the tower during daylight hours, to indicate the same tidal conditions.

The main light characteristic changed in 1899, from a fixed light to that showing a pattern of three flashes of white light in 30 seconds, this changed in 1922 to the one that is still used today of three flashes over a period of ten seconds.

The lighthouse is maintained by the Commissioners of Irish Lights, and is registered under the international Admiralty number A5928 and has the NGA identifier of 114-6704.

== Green Island and Vidal Bank leading lights ==
Marking the narrow channel within Carlingford Lough near Haulbowline are the leading lights of Green Island and Vidal Bank. The lighthouse keepers at Haulbowline historically also maintained these lights.

== See also ==
- Haulbowline, an island in Cork Harbour
- List of lighthouses in Ireland
