= Craig Lynch =

Craig Lynch may refer to:

- Craig Lynch (Gaelic footballer)
- Craig Lynch (English footballer), (born 1992)
