= Kilbroney Park =

Public park in Northern Ireland

- Páirc Chill Bhrónai
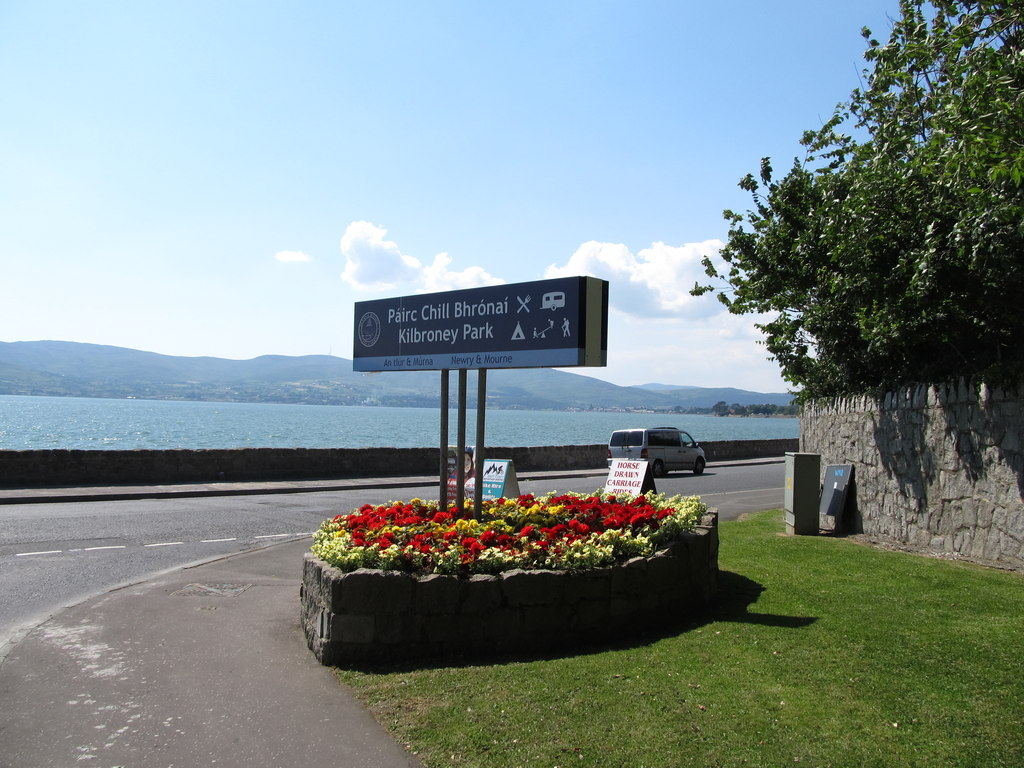
- Park entrance

- Location within County Down
- Type: Public park
- Location: Near Rostrevor, County Down, Northern Ireland
- Coordinates: 54°05′50″N 6°11′26″W
- Created: 1977
- Operator: Newry, Mourne and Down District Council
- Status: Open year round from 9 am

Kilbroney Park (Irish: Páirc Chill Bhrónai) is a park near Rostrevor in Northern Ireland. Formerly a country estate, it was visited by William Makepeace Thackeray, Charles Dickens and Seamus Heaney and may have been the inspiration for Narnia in the writings of C. S. Lewis. It came into the ownership of the Lyon family, and the future Queen Elizabeth II and Princess Margaret holidayed there as children. The park has been run by Newry, Mourne and Down District Council since 1977 and features a children's play area, tennis courts and a cafe. It has a large collection of rare and historic trees, including "Old Homer", a holm oak that was voted Northern Ireland's Tree of the Year in 2016. A glacial erratic in the park is connected with the legend of the giant Finn Mac Cool.

== History ==
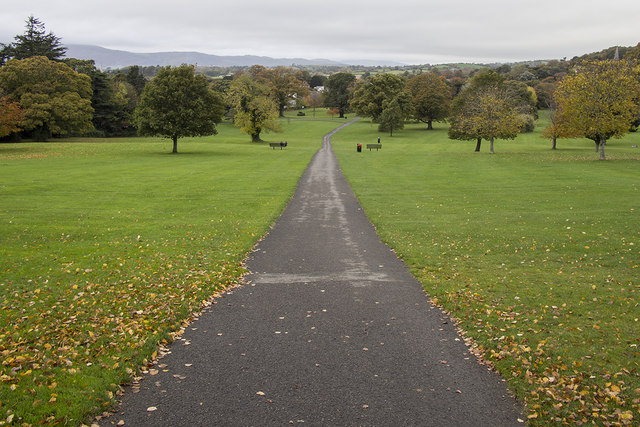
Park drive

The park was originally known as The Meadow and formed part of the large Ross Family estate in Rostrevor from the early 1700s – their house, known as The Lodge was built in 1716. One of the more famous members of that family was General Robert Ross, who served in the British Army during the Napoleonic Wars and was responsible for the burning of the White House in the War of 1812. The Ross family were responsible for planting many of the non-native trees that are still found in the area including redwood, Monterey pine, holm oak, ash, sycamore and cherry. The park was purchased by Colonel Roxburgh in 1850; William Makepeace Thackeray is thought to have visited at around this time and drawn inspiration from the landscape. Thackeray remarked that had the estate been located in England it would be widely regarded as "a world's wonder".

Roxburgh sold the estate to the Hon Albert Stratford Canning, second son of 1st Baron Garvagh, in 1863, and he added a zoo, aviary and arboretum. Canning was friends with the writer Charles Dickens, who was a frequent guest at the estate. After Canning's 1916 death the estate passed to his cousin Major Lyon, who rented it out. It passed to Lyon's daughter Marianne who was a second cousin of Elizabeth Angela Marguerite Bowes-Lyon, who became Queen of the United Kingdom in 1936. The future Queen Elizabeth II and her sister Princess Margaret holidayed on the estate in 1937. The queen is said to have remembered it well when asked about it decades later. During the Second World War the estate served as a camp for German prisoners of war. Kilbroney was later visited by the writer C. S. Lewis and may have helped provide the inspiration for the land of Narnia and subsequently by poet Seamus Heaney. The Lyon family sold Kilbroney to the local council in 1977. They demolished the lodge in 1980 but a plan to develop part of the estate for housing was abandoned after local people threatened to handcuff themselves to the park gates in protest. It is currently in the ownership of Newry, Mourne and Down District Council, is open as a public park and designated as an open space amenity.

== Description ==
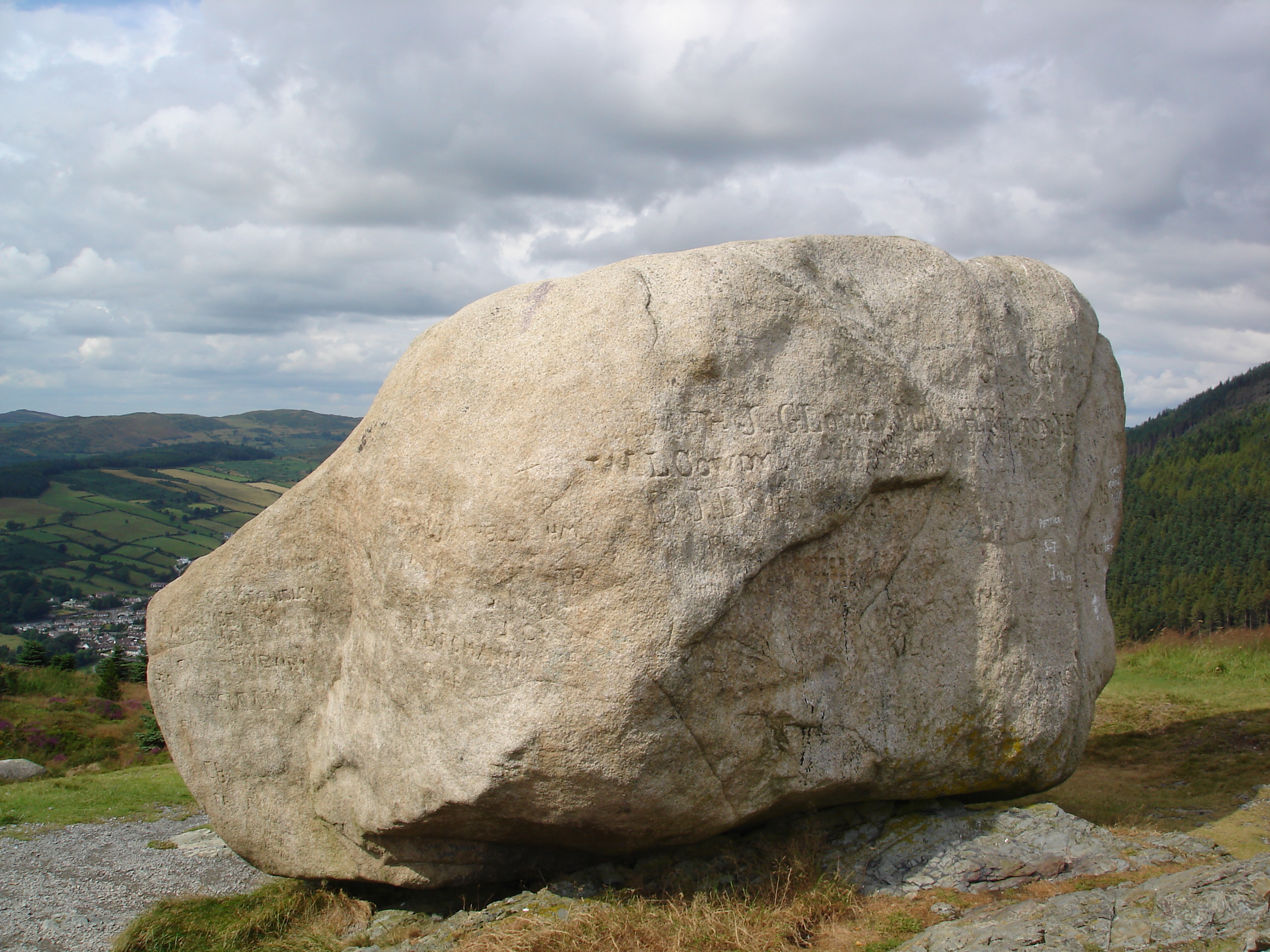
Cloughmore Stone

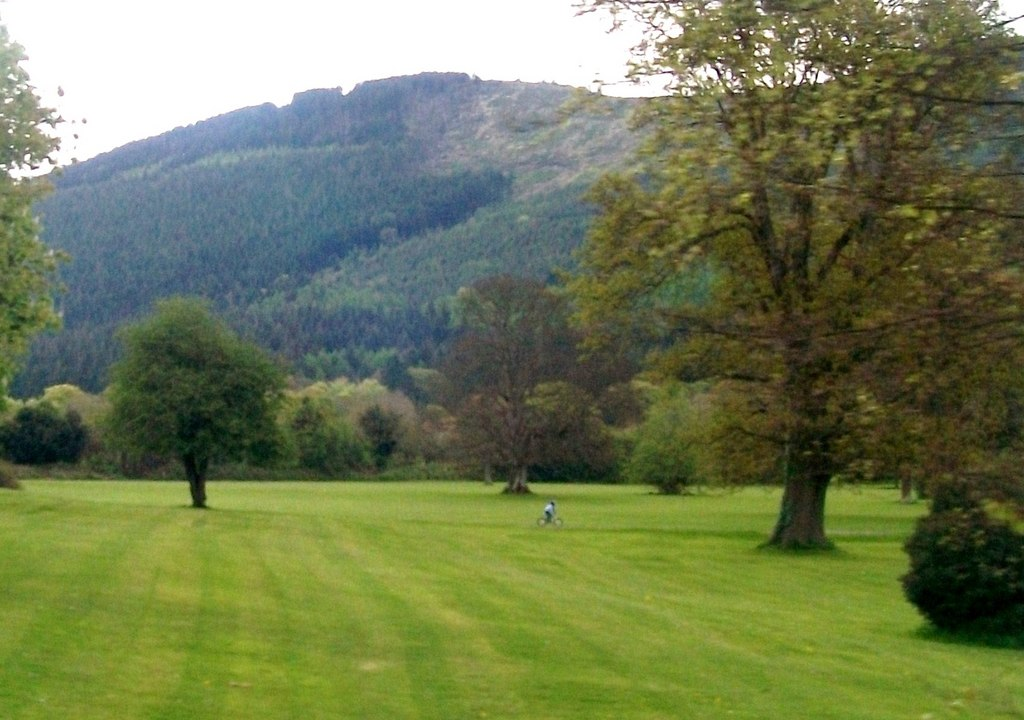
Landscape

Kilbroney Park is located off the A2 Shore Road, with a pedestrian entrance accessible by footpath from Rostrevor. The park features a two-mile forest drive leading to the car park and expansive views across the nearby Carlingford Lough and the Mourne Area of Outstanding Natural Beauty. The park has a children's play area, tennis courts, cafe and a tourist information point and is open from 9 am. There are two caravan parks on site, a mountain bike trail and a Narnia-themed walking trail. Located 1,000 feet (300 m) above Rostrevor is the Cloughmore Stone, a 30-tonne glacial erratic left behind after the ice age. Local folklore holds that the stone was thrown there by the Irish giant Finn Mac Cool during a fight with a Scottish giant. The Scottish giant is said to have created Lough Neagh by scooping a clod of earth from the ground. Having missed Mac Cool this clod landed in the Irish Sea where it became the Isle of Man.

Kilbroney Park is set within the wider Rostrevor Oak Forest – a 16.63 hectare ancient woodland, national nature reserve and special area of conservation – and as well as oak, ash, hazel, sycamore, douglas fir, ferns, wild garlic, primroses and bluebells, contains rarer plants and trees. These include wood avens, the hard shield fern, giant fir, eight monkey puzzle trees, twelve redwoods (planted by Canning between 1880 and 1890), toothwort, bird's nest orchids and wood fescue. Notable individual trees include a 500-year-old sessile oak, a 200-year-old Monterey pine and a 200-year-old Turkey oak, which is said to be the most photographed tree in the park.

== Old Homer ==
A 200-year-old Quercus ilex (holm oak) tree known as "Old Homer" is located near to the park's pedestrian entrance at Fairy Glen. Famous for growing at a 45-degree angle from the ground, which makes it easy for children to climb, it is said to have been well loved by generations of local people. The evergreen tree is almost 12 feet (3.7 m) in girth and has distinctive "snakeskin" bark; one of its boughs was recently propped to prevent collapse. The tree has links to folk music – it is the site of performances during the park's "Fiddler's Green", and the ashes of Scottish folk singer Danny Kyle were scattered beneath the tree.

Old Homer was entered into the Northern Irish Tree of the Year competition in 2016; it secured more than half of the votes cast and won the competition. The £1,000 winner's grant was used to fund plaques for historic trees in the park, produce a book about the trees and to purchase 400 saplings, which were planted across the park by schoolchildren. As a result of the win it was entered into the European Tree of the Year for 2017. It garnered 7,101 vote and placed sixth out of 16 trees.

== See also ==
- List of tourist attractions in Ireland
