= Cranfield Point =

Headland in County Down, Northern Ireland

Coordinates: 54.0166°N 6.06°W

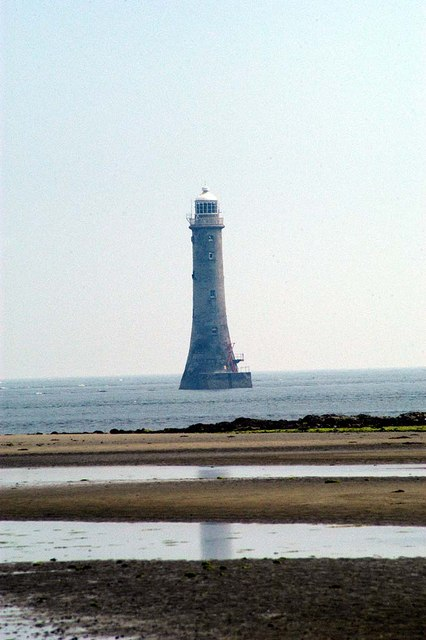
Haulbowline Lighthouse, Cranfield Point

Cranfield Point (Irish: Pointe Chreamhchoille) is the southernmost point of Northern Ireland. It is located at the mouth of Carlingford Lough in the townland of Cranfield, County Down.

It was once the site of the Cranfield Point lighthouse, marking the entrance to the lough. Its poor position led to the construction of the Haulbowline Lighthouse situated in the middle of the entrance to Carlingford Lough. Cranfield Point Lighthouse subsequently fell victim to coastal erosion and collapsed into the sea during the 1860s. The lighthouse keeper's cottage remained and was later converted into a private residence that can still be seen as of 2007, identified by its characteristic tall black chimneys.
