= Cloughmore =

Granite boulder in Northern Ireland

Coordinates: 54.098°N 6.192°W

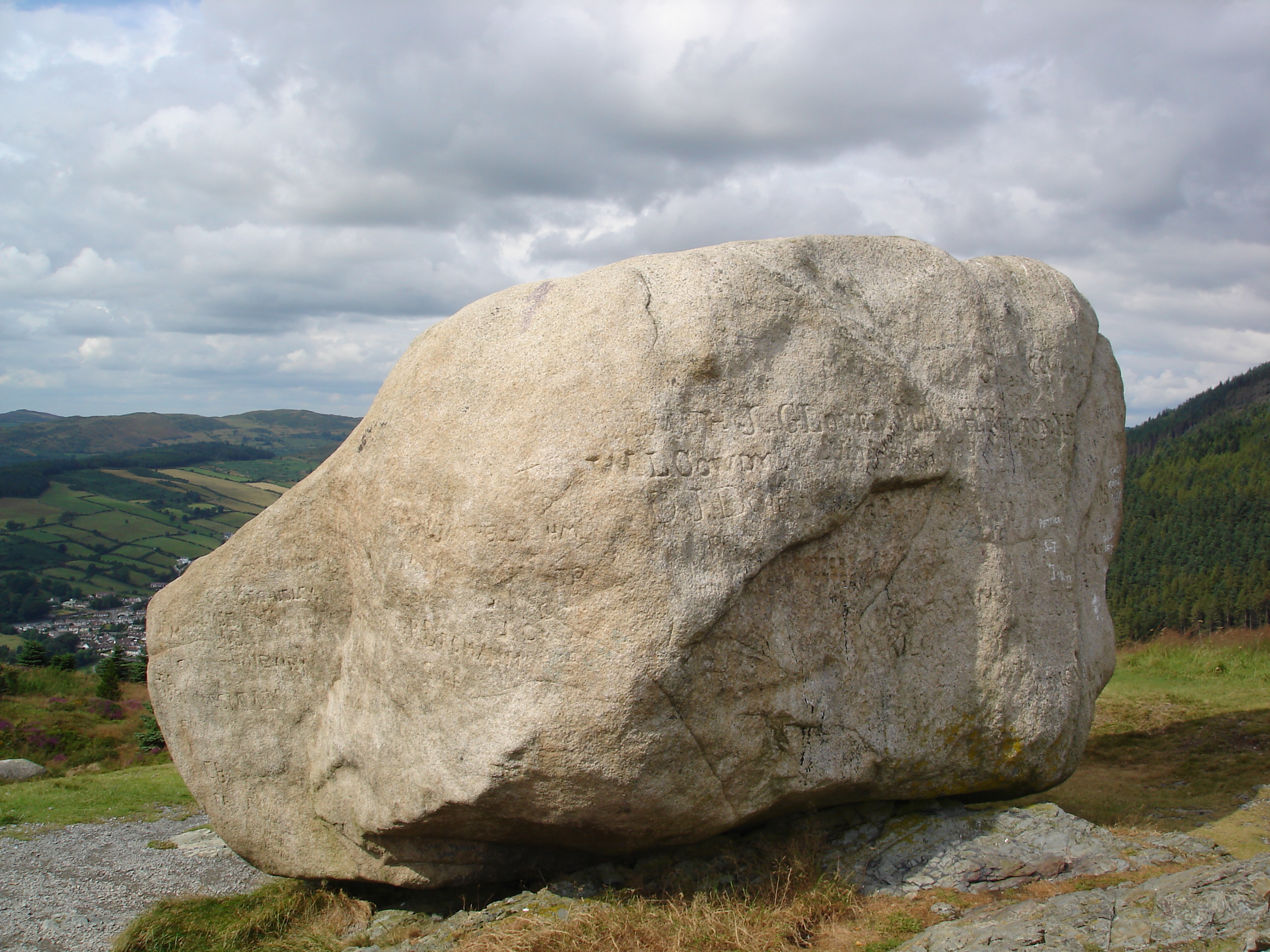
Cloughmore Stone

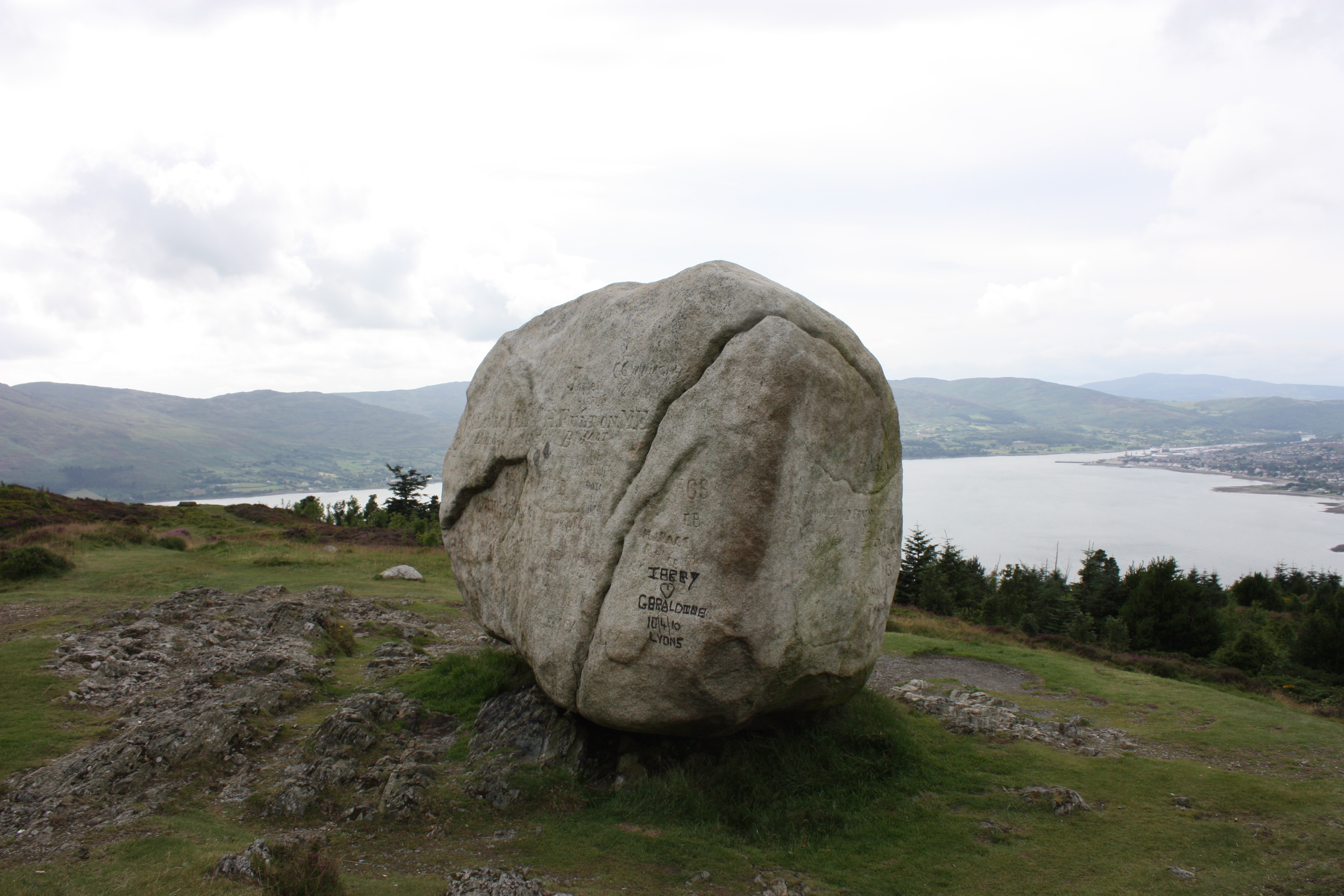
The view towards Carlingford Lough

Cloughmore or Cloghmore (from Irish An Chloch Mhór 'the big stone'), known locally as "The Big Stone", is a huge granite boulder perched on a mountainside almost 1,000 feet (300 m) above the village of Rostrevor, County Down, Northern Ireland. It sits on the slopes of Slieve Martin in Kilbroney Park, overlooking Rostrevor Forest, Carlingford Lough and the Cooley Peninsula. It is popular destination for visitors, and is part of a National Nature Reserve and Area of Special Scientific Interest.

The granite boulder, which has a calculated mass of 50 tonnes, is a glacial erratic, thought to have been transported from Scotland (from an island in Strathclyde bay) and deposited about 10,000 years ago by retreating ice during the last Ice Age. It sits on a relatively flat area of Silurian metasedimentary rock.

Local legend has it that the stone was thrown from the Cooley Mountains, on the other side of Carlingford Lough, by Fionn mac Cumhaill.

== See also ==
- List of individual rocks
