= Craig Lynch (Gaelic footballer) =

Louth Gaelic footballer

Sport
- Sport: Gaelic football
- Position: Goalkeeper
Clubs
Years	Club	Apps (scores)
	Naomh Máirtín; Rostrevor	2025–
Inter-county
- Years: County
- Louth

Craig Lynch is an Irish Gaelic footballer who has played as a goalkeeper for Naomh Máirtín and the Louth county team.

Lynch first played for the Louth senior team in the 2015 season and won four National League titles. He retired from inter-county football at the beginning of the 2022 season when Mickey Harte managed. However, he returned from retirement in the 2024 season when Ger Brennan managed. Brennan had sussed Lynch out for insights before taking over as manager.

He joined Rostrevor in 2025.
