= 2022 Louth county football team season =

Louth county football team
2022 season
- Manager: Mickey Harte
- NFL D3: Winner (promoted)
- All-Ireland SFC: Round 1 qualifier
- Leinster SFC: Quarter-finalist
- O'Byrne Cup: Group stage

The following is a summary of Louth county football team's 2022 season.

== Competitions ==
=== O'Byrne Cup ===
Games took place 8–15 January 2022. Louth were placed in Group A.

==== Table ====
Pos	Team	Pld	W	D	L	PF	PA	PD	Pts	Qualification
1	Dublin	3	3	0	0	74	39	+35	6	Advance to final
2	Offaly	3	2	0	1	51	54	−3	4	
3	Longford	3	1	0	2	53	52	+1	2	
4	Louth	3	0	0	3	40	73	−33	0	

Updated to match(es) played on 15 January 2022. Source: Leinster GAA

=== National Football League Division 3 ===
Louth were promoted to Division 2. Louth also won the Division 3 title for the first time since 2011.

==== Table ====
Pos	Team	Pld	W	D	L	PF	PA	PD	Pts	Qualification
1	Louth	7	5	1	1	90	83	+7	11	Advance to NFL Division 3 Final and promotion to 2023 NFL Division 2
2	Limerick	7	5	0	2	91	83	+8	10	Advance to NFL Division 3 Final and promotion to 2023 NFL Division 2
3	Westmeath	7	4	1	2	89	78	+11	9	
4	Antrim	7	3	1	3	88	71	+17	7	
5	Fermanagh	7	2	2	3	91	91	0	6	
6	Longford	7	2	1	4	81	102	−21	5	
7	Laois	7	2	1	4	92	88	+4	5	Relegation to 2023 NFL Division 4
8	Wicklow	7	1	1	5	77	103	−26	3	Relegation to 2023 NFL Division 4

Updated to match(es) played on 27 March 2022. Source: GAA.ie
Rules for classification: Tiebreakers — Longford finished ahead of Laois due to their head-to-head record.

==== Fixtures ====
30 January 2022 Round 1	Louth	1-10 (13) – (18) 3-09	Laois	Ardee
14:00 GMT (UTC+0)				Venue: Páirc Mhuire
		Report		Referee: Seán Laverty (Antrim)

6 February 2022 Round 2	Longford	0-09 (9) – (9) 1-06	Louth	Longford
14:00 GMT (UTC+0)				Venue: Pearse Park
		Report		Referee: N McKenna (Monaghan)

20 February 2022 Round 3	Limerick	1-12 (15) – (17) 1-14	Louth	Limerick
14:30 GMT (UTC+0)				Venue: UL North Campus
		Report		Referee: D Murnane (Cork)

27 February 2022 Round 4	Louth	1-15 (18) – (16) 1-13	Westmeath	Ardee
14:00 GMT (UTC+0)				Venue: Páirc Mhuire
		Report		Referee: Conor Dourneen (Cavan)

13 March 2022 Round 5	Fermanagh	0-14 (14) – (18) 2-12	Louth	Enniskillen
15:30 GMT (UTC+0)				Venue: Brewster Park
		Report		Referee: Martin McNally (Monaghan)

20 March 2022 Round 6	Louth	1-12 (15) – (11) 1-08	Antrim	Ardee
14:00 GMT (UTC+0)				Venue: Páirc Mhuire
		Report

27 March 2022 Round 7	Wicklow	1-13 (16) – 2-17 (23)	Louth	Aughrim
14:00 GMT (UTC+0)				Venue: Aughrim County Ground

2 April 2022
15:30
Final

Louth	1-14–0-12	Limerick
Mulroy (0-6, 3f, 2'45), Byrne (0-4), L. Jackson (1-0), Clutterbuck (0-1), Durnin (0-1), Nally (0-1), Sharkey (0-1)	Report	J. Ryan (0-3, 1f), H. Bourke (0-2), Enright (0-2), Nash (0-2), R. Bourke (0-2f), M. Donovan (0-1)

Croke Park, Dublin
Referee: B. Griffin (Kerry)

GK	1	James Califf (Dreadnots)
RCB	2	Dan Corcoran (Geraldines)
FB	3	Bevan Duffy (St Fechin's)
LCB	4	Donal McKenny (St Mary's)
RHB	5	Leonard Grey (St Patrick's)
CHB	6	Niall Sharkey (Glyde Rangers)
LHB	7	Conall McKeever (Clan Na Gael)
MF	8	Tommy Durnin (Inniskeen Grattans, Monaghan)
MF	9	John Clutterbuck (Naomh Máirtin)
RHF	10	Liam Jackson (St Mary's)
CHF	11	Sam Mulroy (Naomh Máirtin) (c)
LHF	12	Craig Lennon (St Mochta's)
RCF	13	Ciarán Byrne (St Mochta's)
FF	14	Ciarán Downey (Newtown Blues)
LCF	15	Dáire Nally (Newtown Blues)
Substitutes:
	16	Tom Jackson (St Mary's) for Lennon
	17	Eóghan Callaghan (Naomh Máirtin) for Grey
	18	Conor Grimes (Glen Emmets) for Nally
	19	Conor Early (Oliver Plunketts) for Clutterbuck

GK	1	Donal O'Sullivan
RCB	2	Seán O'Dea
FB	3	Brian Fanning
LCB	4	Michael Donovan
RHB	5	Cian Sheehan
CHB	6	Iain Corbett
LHB	7	Paul Maher
MF	8	Darragh Treacy
MF	9	Cian Sheehan
RHF	10	Adrian Enright
CHF	11	Killian Ryan
LHF	12	James Naughton
RCF	13	Peter Nash
FF	14	Josh Ryan
LCF	15	Hugh Bourke
Substitutes:
	16	Robert Childs for Fahy
	17	Robbie Bourke for Nash
	18	Pádraig De Brún for Killian Ryan
	19	Jim Liston for Josh Ryan
	20	Tony McCarthy for Treacy

=== Leinster Senior Football Championship ===
==== Bracket ====
Preliminary round 24 April
Louth	5-10
Carlow	0-10
Wexford	1-15
Offaly	1-12
Wicklow	5-15
Laois	4-12

Quarter-finals; 30 April / 1 May
Louth	0-12
Kildare	2-22
Westmeath	3-13
Longford	0-14
Wexford	0-04
Dublin	1-24
Meath	4-13
Wicklow	1-12

Semi-finals; 15 May
Kildare	1-21
Westmeath	2-15
Dublin	1-27
Meath	1-14

Final; 29 May
Kildare	1-15
Dublin	5-17

==== Fixtures ====
24 April 2022; Preliminary round	Louth	5-10 - 0-10	Carlow	Pairc Tailteann, Navan; Attendance: 3,000; Referee: Niall Cullen (Fermanagh); Man of the Match: Sam Mulroy (Naomh Máirtín)
24 April 2022; Preliminary round	Sam Mulroy 2-5 (1-0 pen, 0-3f, 1 '45), Tommy Durnin and Conor Grimes 1-1 each, Ciarán Byrne 1-0, Ciarán Downey 0-2, Conor Earley 0-1	Report	Darragh Foley 0-3 (0-2f), Ross Dunphy 0-2, Josh Moore, Jamie Clarke (0-1f), Conor Crowley, Colm Hulton, Niall Hickey 0-1 each	Pairc Tailteann, Navan; Attendance: 3,000; Referee: Niall Cullen (Fermanagh); Man of the Match: Sam Mulroy (Naomh Máirtín)

1 May 2022; Quarter-final	Kildare	2-22 - 0-12	Louth	O'Connor Park, Tullamore; Attendance: 5,308; Referee: David Gough (Meath); Man of the Match: Ben McCormack (Sarsfields)
1 May 2022; Quarter-final	Darragh Kirwan 1-3 (0-1f), Jimmy Hyland 0-5 (0-1f), Ben McCormack 0-4, Kevin Feely 1-0 pen, Paul Cribbin and Daniel Flynn (0-1m) 0-3 each, Paddy Woodgate 0-2 (0-1f), Alex Beirne and Brian McLoughlin 0-1 each	Report	Sam Mulroy 0-5 (0-1m, 0-1f), Conor Grimes 0-3 (0-2f), Tommy Durnin, Conor Early, Ciarán Byrne, Jack Murphy 0-1 each	O'Connor Park, Tullamore; Attendance: 5,308; Referee: David Gough (Meath); Man of the Match: Ben McCormack (Sarsfields)

=== All-Ireland Senior Football Championship ===
Louth entered Round 1 of the All-Ireland SFC qualifiers.

==== Fixtures ====
4 June 2022 Round 1	Cork	2–12 – 2–08	Louth	Páirc Uí Chaoimh, Cork
	S Sherlock (0–8, 0–6 frees); B Hurley (1–4, 0–1 mark); C O’Callaghan (1–0).	Report	L Jackson (1–1); S Mulroy (0–4, 0–4 frees); C Grimes (1–0); D Corcoran, C Downey, T Jackson (0–1 each).	Referee: Fergal Kelly (Longford)

== Notable events ==
Niall Sharkey was Senior Footballer of the Year.
