= Exploris =

Exploris Aquarium and Seal Sanctuary
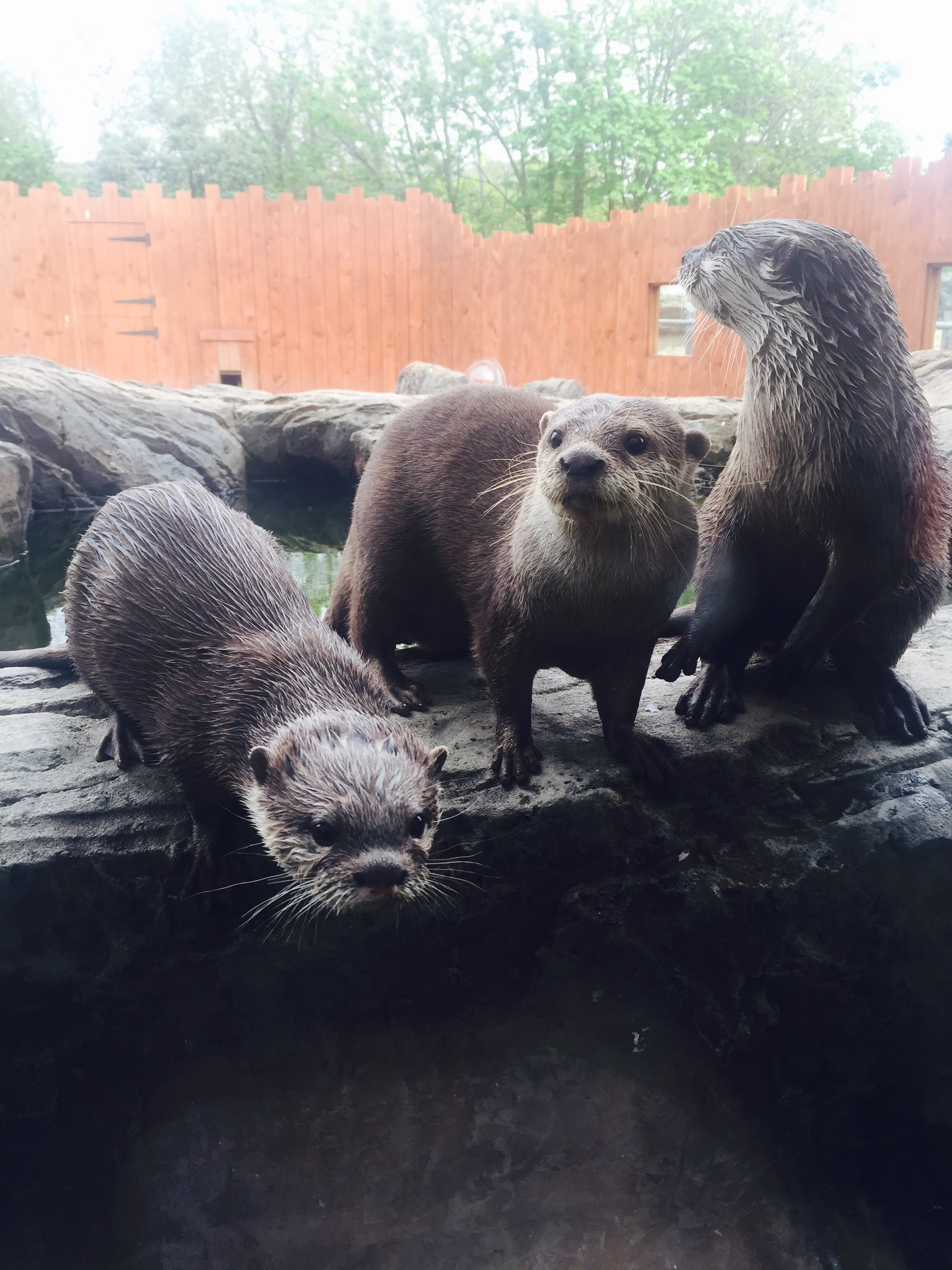
- Interactive map of Exploris Aquarium and Seal Sanctuary
- 54.382°N 5.549°W
- Date opened: 1987, re-opened 2016
- Location: Portaferry, Ards and North Down, Northern Ireland
- Volume of largest tank: 250,000
- Annual visitors: 100,000+
- Major exhibits: Ocean tank, Seal Sanctuary, Otter Habitat & Reptiles of the Rainforest
- Public transit: Ulsterbus
- Website: www.explorisni.com

Exploris is a public aquarium situated in Portaferry, Northern Ireland. The facility is the only public aquarium in Northern Ireland and it is located on the shores of the Marine Nature reserve of Strangford Lough, which is an important winter migration destination for many wading and sea birds. The lough is home to almost 75% of the marine species found in Northern Ireland, including common seals, basking sharks and brent geese. Three quarters of the world population of pale bellied brent geese spend winter in the lough area. Exploris illustrates and exhibits the large variety of animals that live in Strangford Lough.

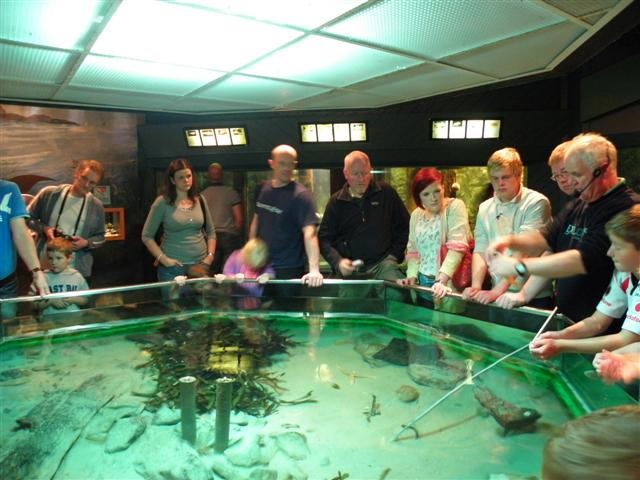
Interior view

Exploris was closed in late 2014 for refurbishment. It reopened in August 2016 following an investment of close to £1.5m in refurbishment works by the operators, Crumlin Road Gaol Ltd., but also with the help of the Department of the Environment.

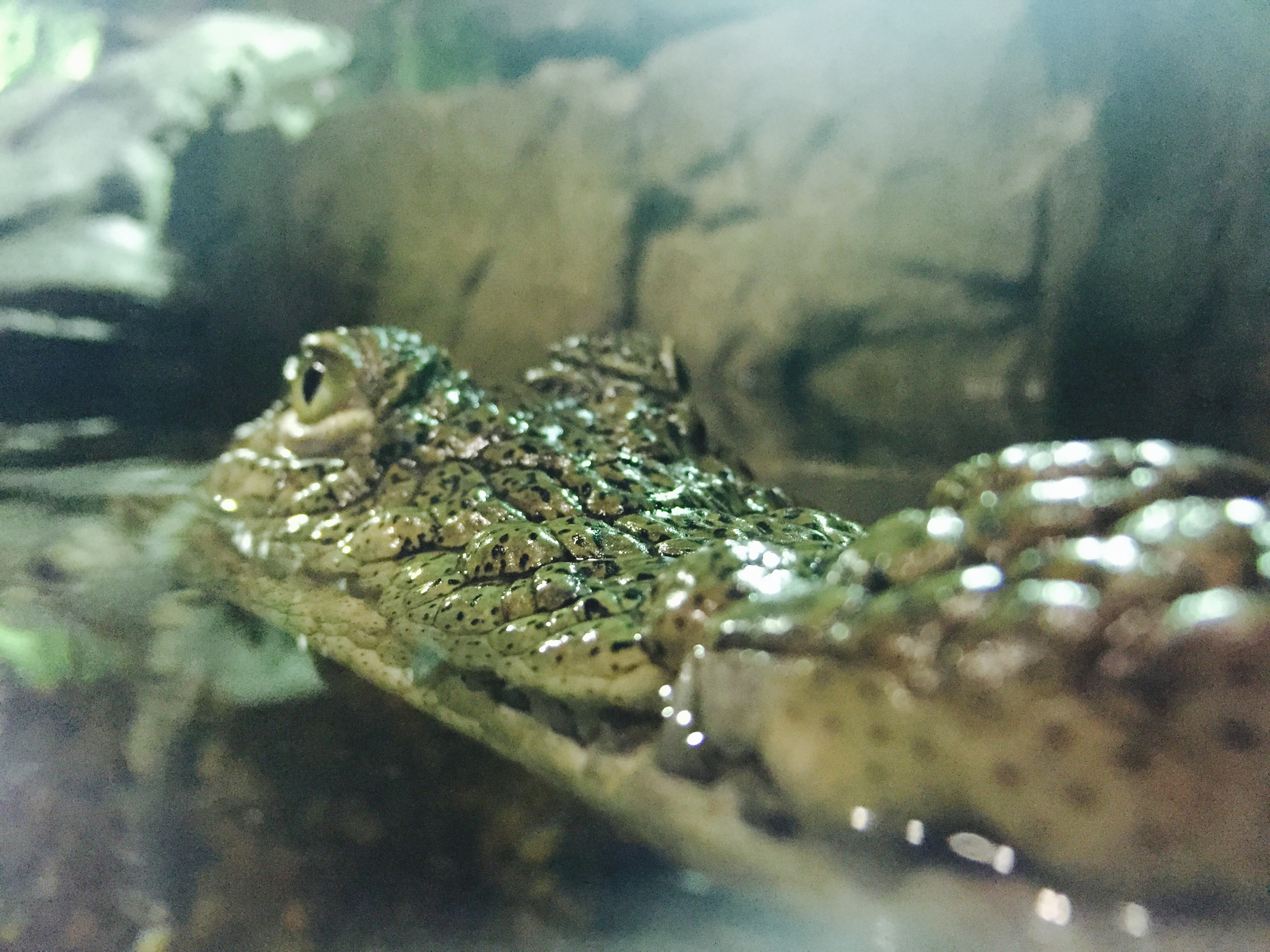
Nile crocodile
