= Rostrevor =

Village in County Down, Northern Ireland

Coordinates: 54.101°N 6.201°W

Rostrevor: Irish: Ros Treabhair
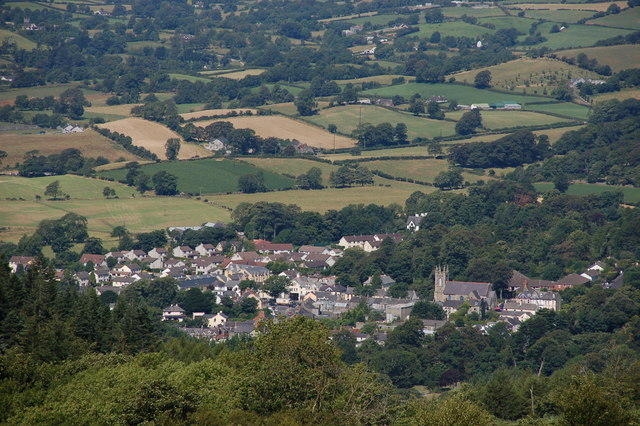
- Rostrevor seen from Kilbroney Forest

- Location within County Down
- Population: 2,800 (2011 census)
- District: Newry, Mourne and Down
- County: County Down
- Country: Northern Ireland
- Sovereign state: United Kingdom
- Post town: NEWRY
- Postcode district: BT34
- Dialling code: 028
- UK Parliament: South Down
- NI Assembly: South Down

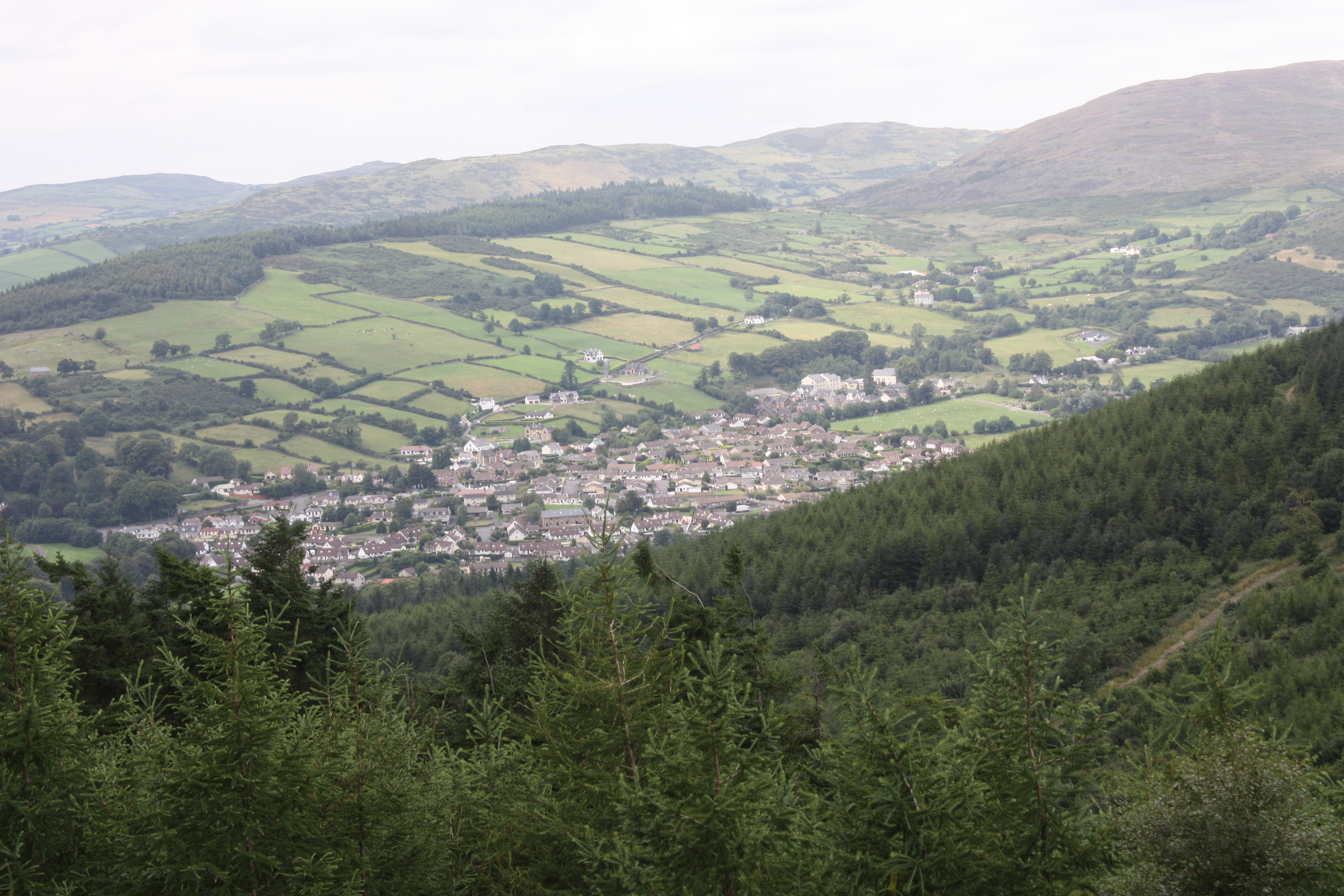
Rostrevor seen from Rostrevor Forest in 2010 (Carlingford Lough is to the left of the picture)

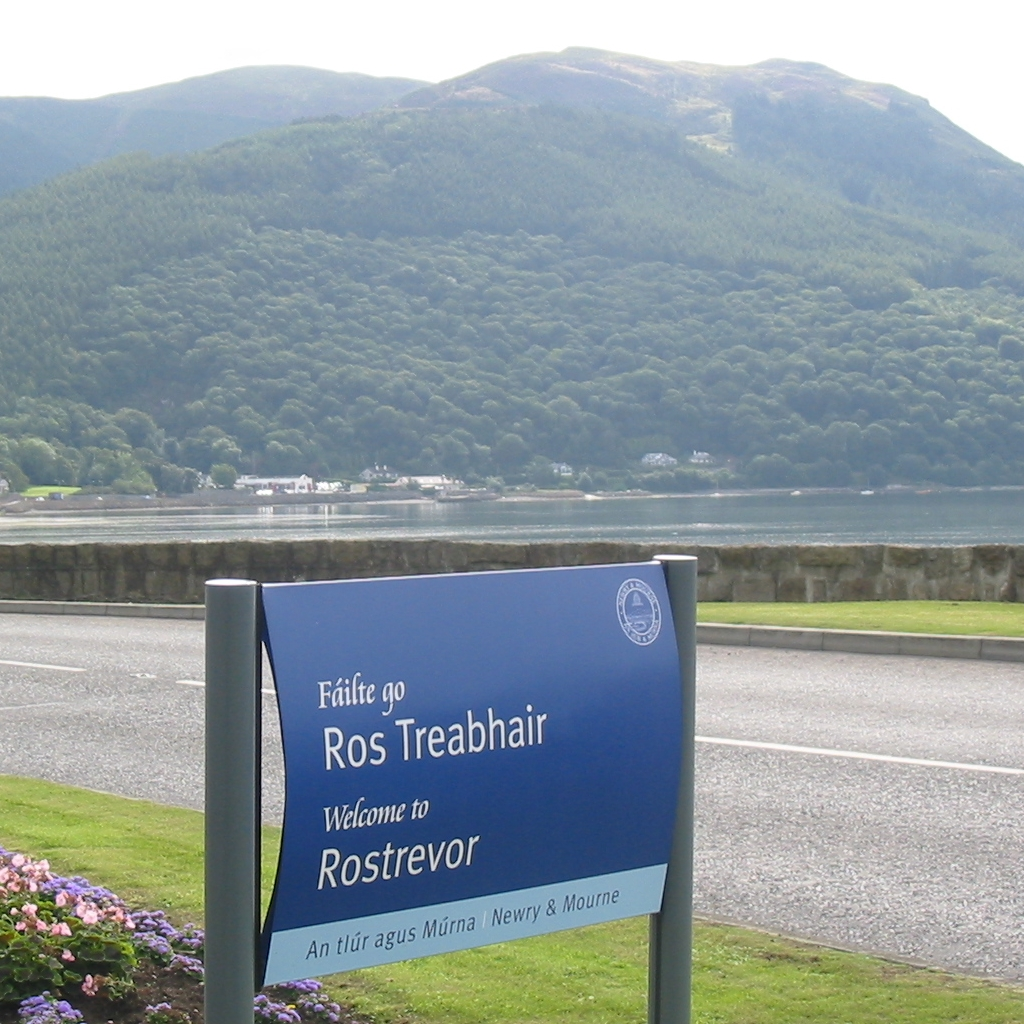
Rostrevor welcome sign in Irish and English, with Slieve Martin in the background

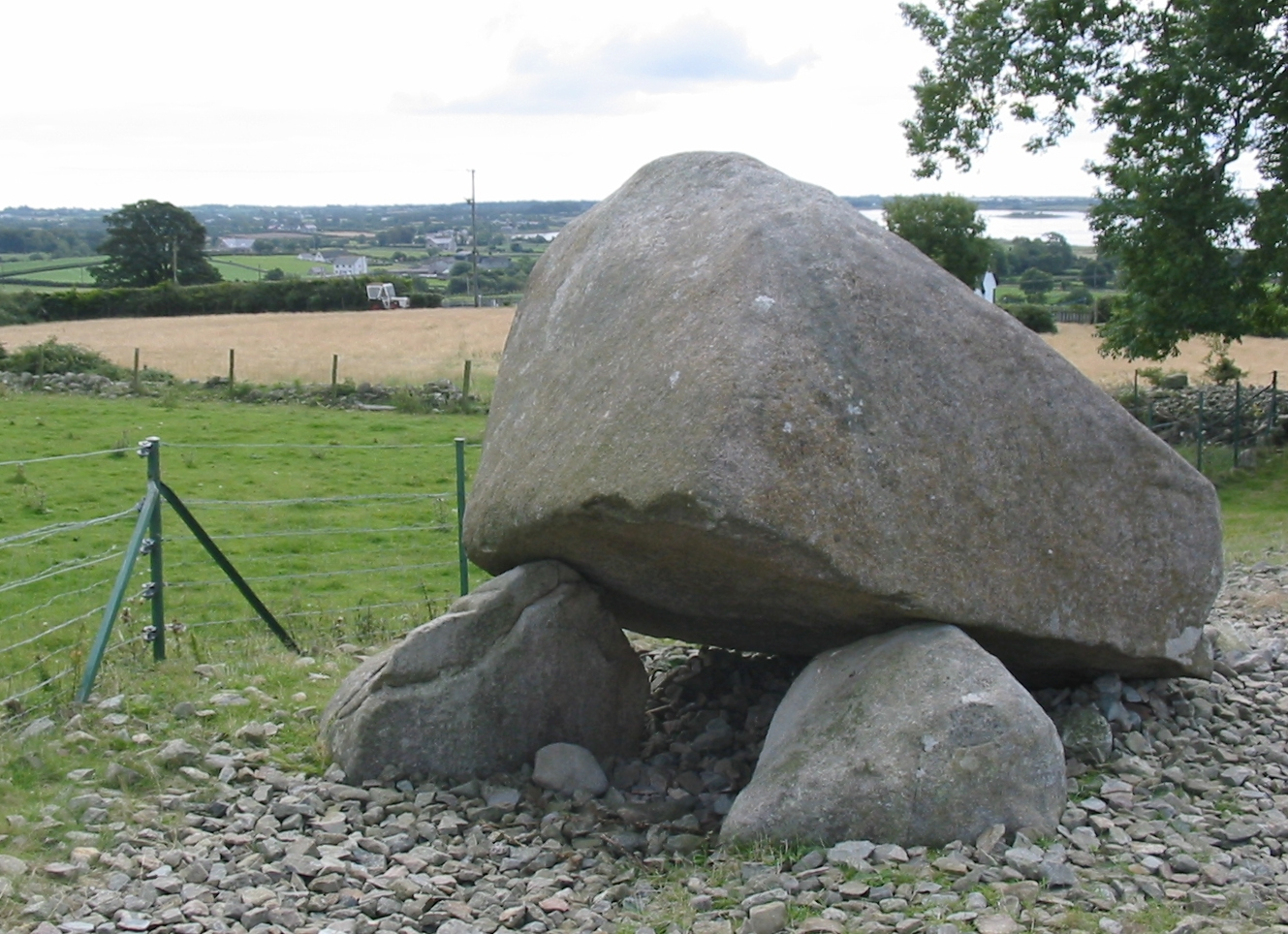
Kilfeaghan dolmen

Rostrevor (Irish: Ros Treabhair) is a village and townland in County Down, Northern Ireland. It lies at the foot of Slieve Martin on the coast of Carlingford Lough, near Warrenpoint. The Kilbroney River flows through the village and Rostrevor Forest is nearby. 7.5 miles (12 km) south-east of Newry, the village is within the Newry, Mourne and Down local government district.

Rostrevor had a population of 2,800 in the 2011 census.

== Name ==
The first part of the name "Rostrevor" comes from the Irish word ros, meaning a wood or wooded headland. The second part of the name comes from Sir Edward Trevor from Denbighshire in Wales, who settled in the area in the early 17th century and was succeeded by his son Marcus Trevor, who later became Viscount Dungannon. Walter Harris, writing in 1744, mistakenly believed that the first part of the name came from Sir Edward Trevor's wife Rose, a daughter of Henry Ussher, Archbishop of Armagh. His etymology was later repeated by some other writers. Before Sir Edward Trevor's renaming of the area it was known as Caisleán Ruaidhrí (English: Rory's castle), anglicised "Castle Rory" or "Castle Roe", after one of the Magennis lords of Iveagh.

Today the spelling 'Rostrevor' is used for the village, while the spelling 'Rosstrevor' is used for the townland.

== Places of interest ==
The village lies adjacent to Kilbroney Park. Within the park, Cloughmore is a 50-ton granite boulder perched on the slopes of Slieve Martin, 1,000 ft above the village of Rostrevor, and known locally as 'the big stone'. It was deposited there by retreating glaciers during the Last Glacial Maximum. Local folklore states that the stone was thrown by the Irish mythological giant Finn McCool from the Cooley Mountains, on the other side of Carlingford Lough, to settle a fight with a local frost-giant named Ruiscairre, burying him underneath the boulder.

The old church, supposedly built on an original site established by St Brónach, stands in the graveyard on the Kilbroney road. It became a listed building in 1983. Within the graveyard is a large, weathered cross that is patterned on its west face and has been dated to the 9th century.

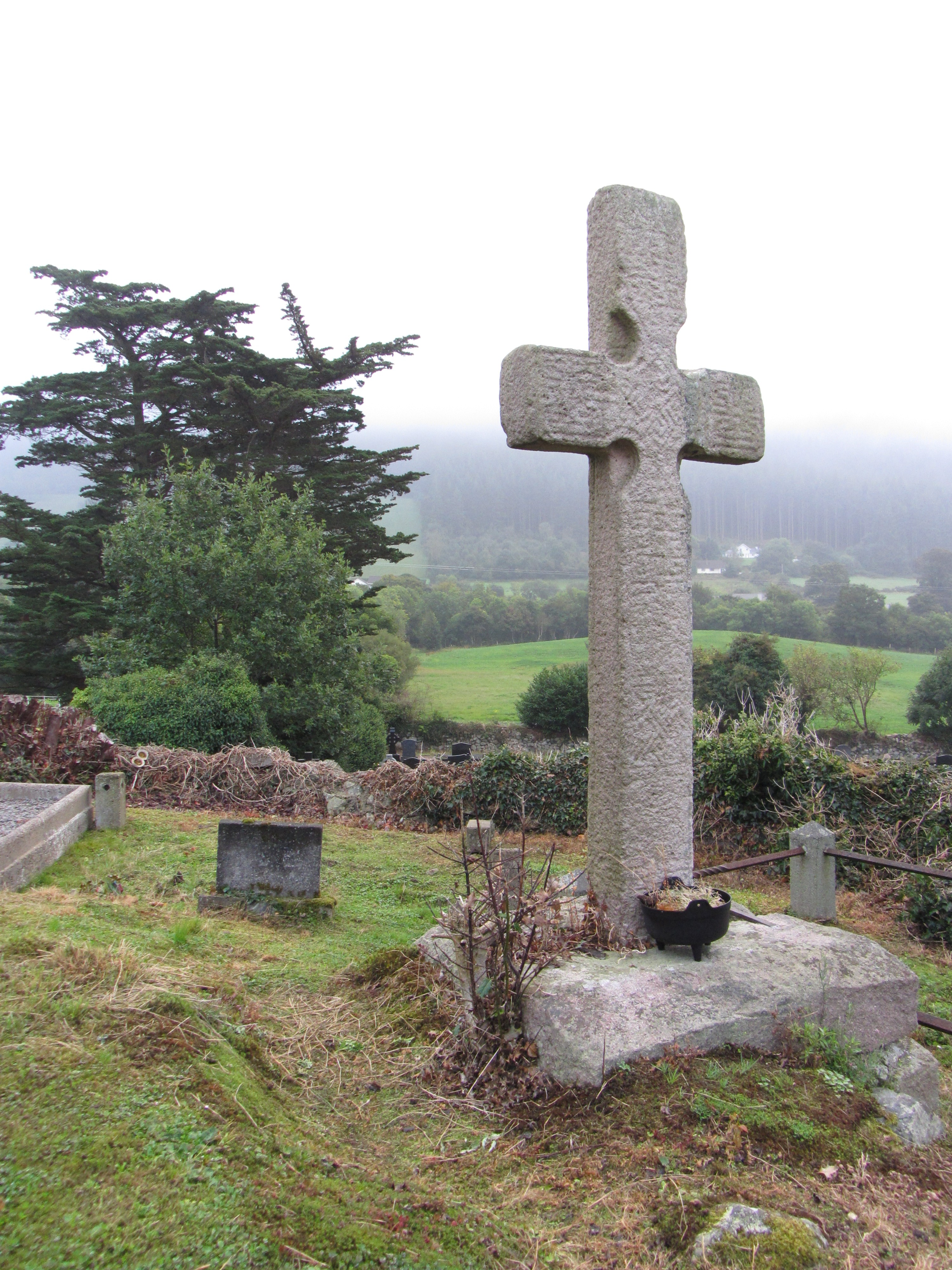
9th-century cross in Kilbroney cemetery, Rostrevor

In the village's Catholic church is the bell of Brónach, dating from around 900 A.D. Local folklore relays stories of how the bell, previously hidden, scared locals as they walked past St Bronach's church on stormy nights. It was said that the ringing of the bell warned of rough water on the lough. In 1885, the bell was found in the fork of an old oak tree, where it had been hidden many years before, possibly at the time of the Reformation.

The village has two rivers, the Ghan and the Kilbroney River. The stretch of the Kilbroney River that runs through the village and along the edge of Kilbroney Park is known locally as the Fairy Glen.

== Culture ==
Since 1987, Rostrevor has hosted the Fiddler's Green International Festival, an annual multi-day event celebrating folk music and the arts. The festival features up to 200 events, including concerts, workshops, dances, art exhibitions, and nature walks. Activities take place at various venues throughout the village, such as local schools and churches, the social club of St Bronaghʼs GAA, YWAM An Cuan, a temporary open-air stage in the village centre, and a meadow in Kilbroney Park known locally as Fiddler's Green.

== Education ==
Schools in the area include Kilbroney Integrated Primary School, Killowen Primary School, St. Bronagh's Primary School and YWAM (Youth With a Mission) An Cuan.

== Transportation ==
Rostrevor was previously served by a tram station opened by Warrenpoint and Rostrevor Tramway, a horse-drawn tram service to Warrenpoint. It operated from 1877 until February 1915.

Rostrevor is connected to the wider Northern Ireland public transportation system by Ulsterbus route 39, with service to Newry buscentre, Warrenpoint, and Kilkeel. The shore road in Rostrevor forms part of the Mourne Coastal route, a designated scenic drive that stretches along the coastline from Newry to Belfast.

== Sport ==
The local Gaelic Athletic Association (GAA) club is St Bronaghʼs GAA. The local association football club is Rossowen F.C.

The Fairy Glen stretch of the Kilbroney River is listed by the Loughs Agency as a location for angling. The river supports populations of brown trout and sea trout, with the angling season running from 1 March to 31 October.

Rostrevor Forest is a popular destination for mountain biking, centred on the Rostrevor Mountain Bike Trails within Kilbroney Forest, which comprise approximately 16.4 miles of red (intermediate) trails, 10.4 miles of black (difficult) trails, and 1.9 miles of orange (extreme) trails. The trails are supported by an uplift service operated by Bike Mourne, which transports riders from the Kilbroney Park car park to higher sections of the trail network.

Rostrevor hosts the Top of the Mourne Triathlon, an annual Olympic-distance Triathlon organized by Newry Triathlon Club and administered by Triathlon Ireland. The race consists of a sea swim in Carlingford Lough, a bicycle leg that stretches into the Mourne Mountains, and a run leg centered around Kilbroney Park. The 2025 iteration of the race served as the Triathlon Ireland standard distance national championship.

== Demography ==
On the day of the 2011 census, 27 March 2011, the usually resident population of Rostrevor Settlement was 2,800, accounting for 0.15% of the NI total. Of these:

- 21.14% were under 16 years old and 14.57% were aged 65 and above;
- 48.68% of the population were male and 51.32% were female; and
- 88.96% were from a Catholic community background and 7.75% were from a 'Protestant and Other Christian (including Christian related)' community background.

== People ==
Robert Ross Monument, Rostrevor

- Major General Robert Ross-of-Bladensburg, a British commander during the War of 1812, was born in Rostrevor. Ross's Monument stands above the Warrenpoint Road on the edge of the village. It is a tall granite obelisk erected to his memory in 1826. The Ross family lived at Kilbroney Park.
- Ben Dunne, founder of the chain store Dunnes Stores, was born in the area.
- Sir Francis Stronge lived in Kilbroney House.
- Mary McAleese, former President of Ireland, lived with her family in Rostrevor village before she was elected to office in 1997.
- Tommy Sands, Irish folk singer, lives with his family in Rostrevor.
- Dana, singer and former Eurovision winner, was also resident in Rostrevor for a time.
- T. K. Whitaker, economist and a pivotal figure in the development of the Republic of Ireland, was born in Rostrevor to a father from County Westmeath and a mother from County Clare. The family later moved to Drogheda.
- Catherine McGrath, country singer, is from the village.
- Cathal McCabe, poet, who grew up in nearby Warrenpoint, has lived in and near Rostrevor since 2004.
- Laurence McGivern, Irish Paralympic swimmer and World Bronze Medalist (Canada 2013) was also born in Rostrevor.

== See also ==
- List of villages in Northern Ireland
- List of towns in Northern Ireland
- Rostrevor College, a large school in Adelaide, Australia, named after 'Rostrevor House', the main historic mansion residence constructed on the site in 1878 which itself was named after Rostrevor, Northern Ireland.
