= Carlingford Lough =

Glacial fjord or sea inlet in Ireland

- Loch Cairlinn (Irish); Carlinford Loch (Ulster Scots)
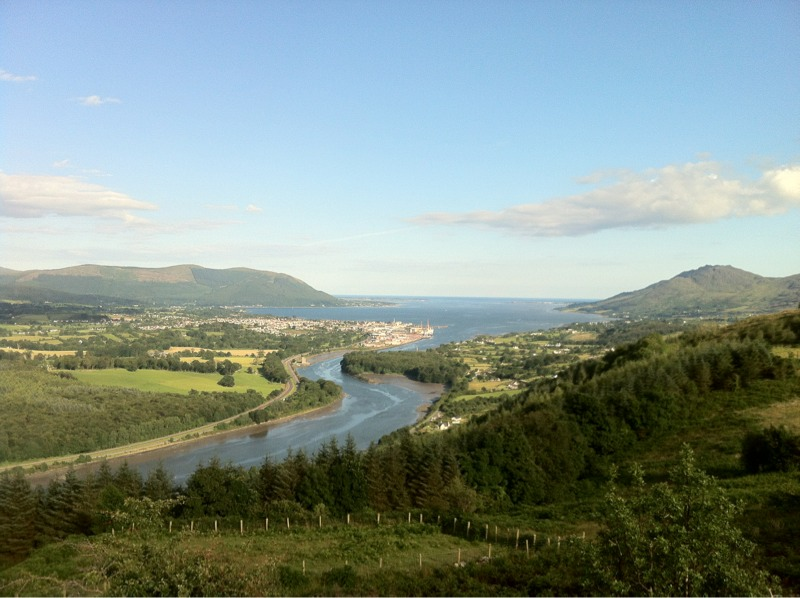
- Looking east, with Warrenpoint at centre

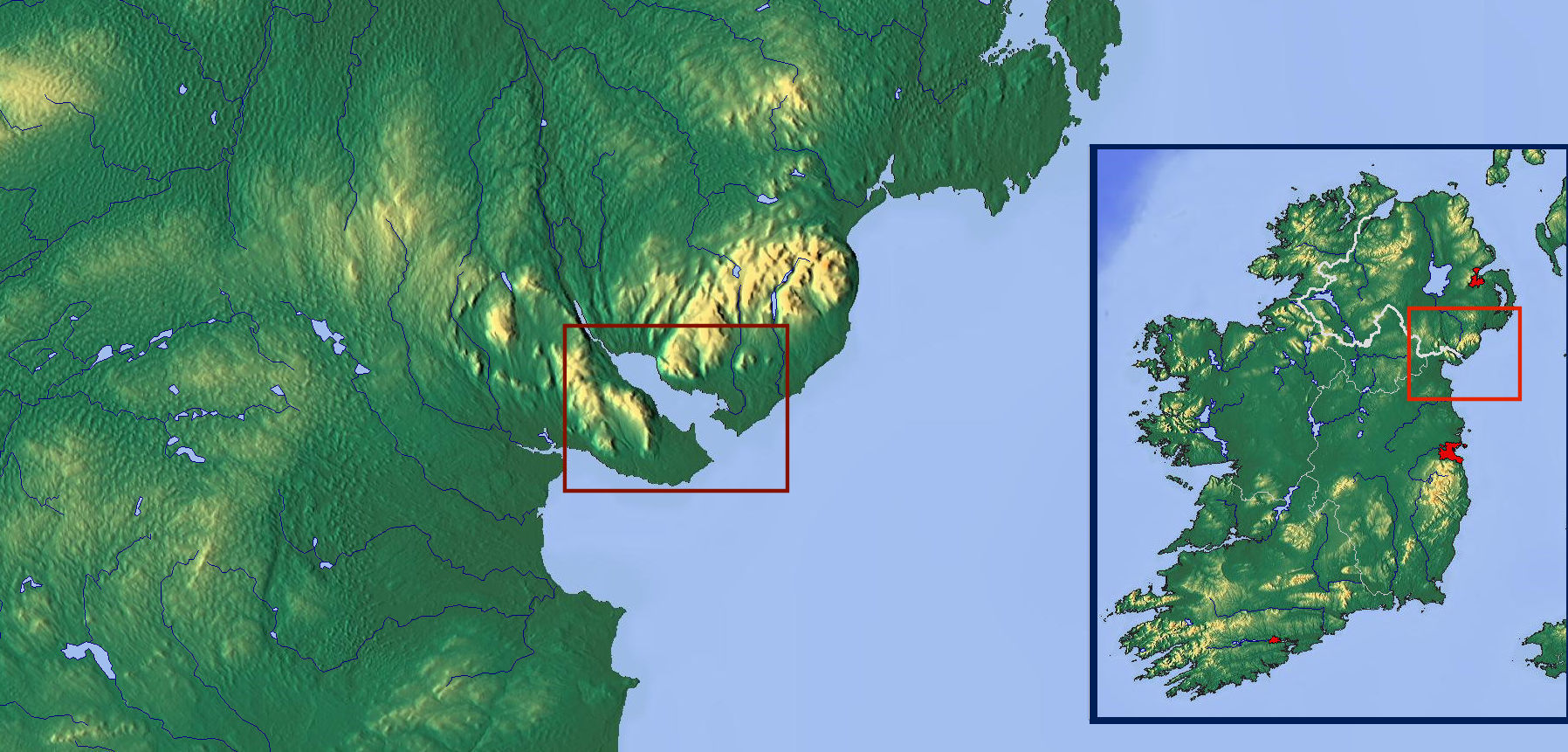

- Location within island of Ireland
- Location: Republic of Ireland – United Kingdom border
- Coordinates: 54.0733°N 6.1994°W
- River sources: Newry River
- Ocean/sea sources: Irish Sea
- Basin countries: Northern Ireland, Republic of Ireland
- Salinity: 31.31–33.99 psu
- Settlements: Carlingford, Greencastle, Greenore, Killowen, Newry, Omeath, Rostrevor, Warrenpoint

Ramsar Wetland
- Designated: 9 March 1998
- Reference no.: 936

Carlingford Lough (Irish: Loch Cairlinn, Ulster Scots: Carlinford Loch) is a glacial fjord or sea inlet in northeastern Ireland, forming part of the border between Northern Ireland to the north and the Republic of Ireland to the south. On its northern shore is County Down, the Mourne Mountains, and the town of Warrenpoint; on its southern shore is County Louth, the Cooley Mountains and the village of Carlingford. The Newry River flows into the loch from the northwest.

== Name ==
The English name Carlingford and the Irish name Loch Cairlinn come from the Old Norse Kerlingfjǫrðr, meaning "narrow sea-inlet of the hag" or old woman. This may have referred to the three mountain tops, locally called The Three Nuns, frequently used as pilot points on entering the lough. Its earlier Irish name was Snámh Aighneach, meaning "swift sea-channel". It could also mean "swift swimming-place", referring to a crossing point which could be swum by horses, probably Narrow Water.

An older English name was Nury (Newry) Bay.

== Geography ==
The Newry River and the Newry Canal link the lough to the nearby city of Newry (the canal continues on towards the River Bann and Lough Neagh; the river, under the name River Clanrye, loops around County Down). The only other glacial fjords in Ireland are Lough Swilly and Killary Harbour.

On the northern coast, in County Down, are the coastal towns of Warrenpoint and Rostrevor, backed by the Mourne Mountains. On the southern coast are Omeath, Carlingford and Greenore backed by the Cooley Mountains, all on the Cooley Peninsula in County Louth.

== Tourism ==
The area has been a tourist destination since Victorian times when the railway between Dublin and Belfast was opened. Situated approximately halfway between the two cities, the access to the area combined with its scenery and sheltered location are still factors in its popularity today.

== Flora and fauna ==
The northern shores have extensive mudflats and salt marshes which provide winter feeding areas for the pale-bellied brent goose (Branta bernicla hrota). At the mouth of the lough are several small rock and shingle islands which are breeding areas for terns that feed in its shallow waters.

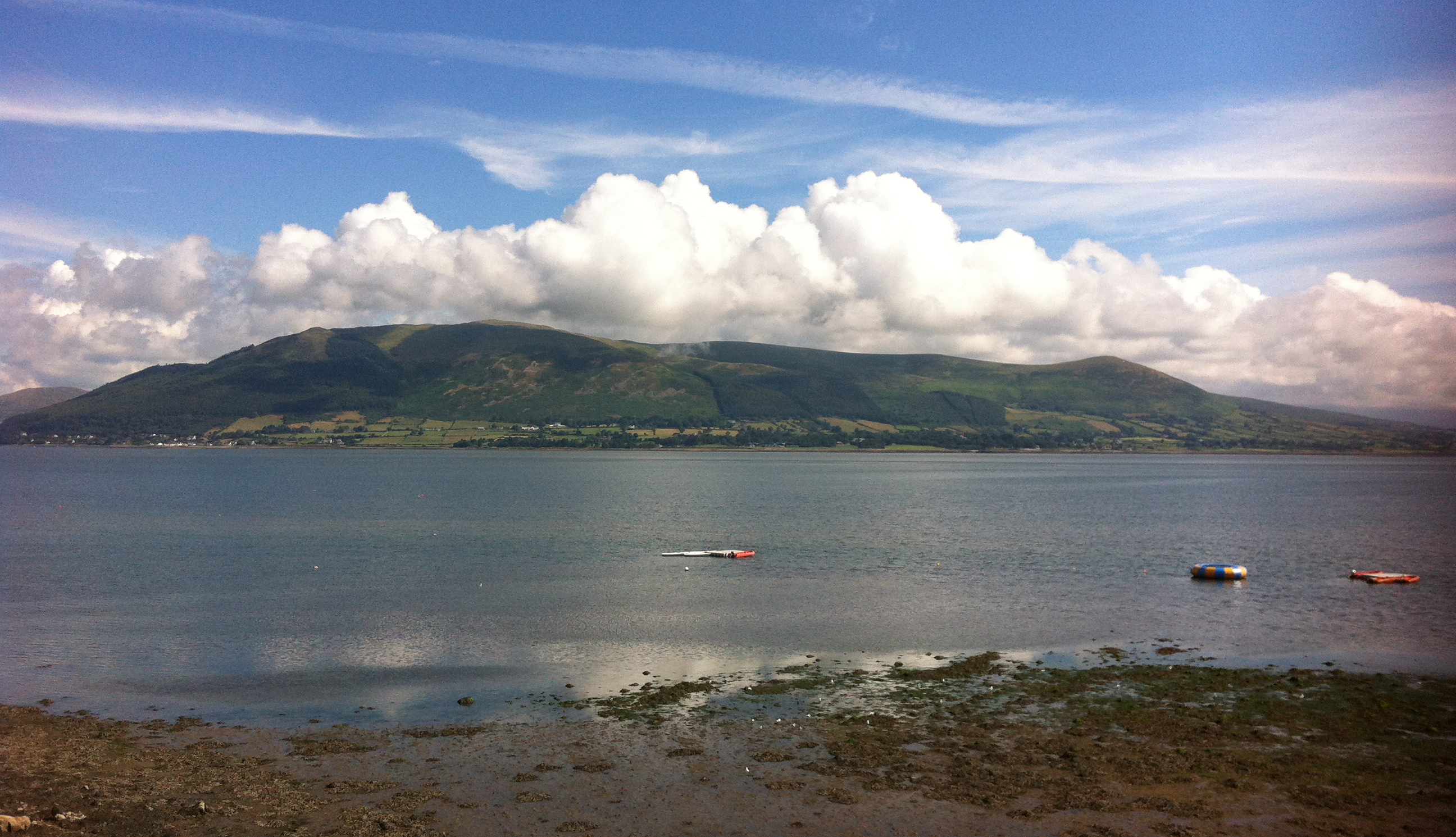
Carlingford Lough looking towards the Mournes

== Protected areas ==
The lough is designated as an Important Bird Area.

The Carlingford Lough Ramsar site (wetlands of international importance designated under the Ramsar Convention), is 830.51 hectares in area, at latitude 54 03 00 N and longitude 06 07 00 W. It was designated a Ramsar site on 9 March 1998. It is a cross-border site, with the northern shore lying within Northern Ireland (including the lough's more extensive mudflats and a salt marsh), and the southern shore lying in the Republic of Ireland (where the Carlingford Lough Special Protection Area falls within the scope of the National Parks and Wildlife Service).

== Transport ==
=== Ferry ===
The Greencastle-Greenore ferry crossing opened in 2017 and has operated in the summer months. It is used by locals and tourists. Services were suspended for the 2026 season.

=== Railway ===
Newry is the nearest station located on the Dublin-Belfast railway line with trains running on the Enterprise between Belfast Grand Central, Portadown and Dublin Connolly, whilst other trains may call at additional stations en route to Bangor.

Until its closure in the early 1950s, the southern side of the lough was served by the Dundalk, Newry and Greenore (DNG) railway line. Sections of this line now form part of the Carlingford Lough greenway.

=== Navigation ===
The lough is navigable, and its seaward entrance is marked by the Haulbowline Lighthouse, which was built in 1824.

There is a deep water cargo port at Greenore, and a smaller fishing harbour at Carlingford. A commercial marina lies north of Carlingford town, close to the start of the greenway.

== See also ==
- List of loughs in Ireland
