= County Down =

County in Northern Ireland

County Down Contae an Dúin (Irish) Coontie Doon/Countie Doun (Ulster-Scots)
- County
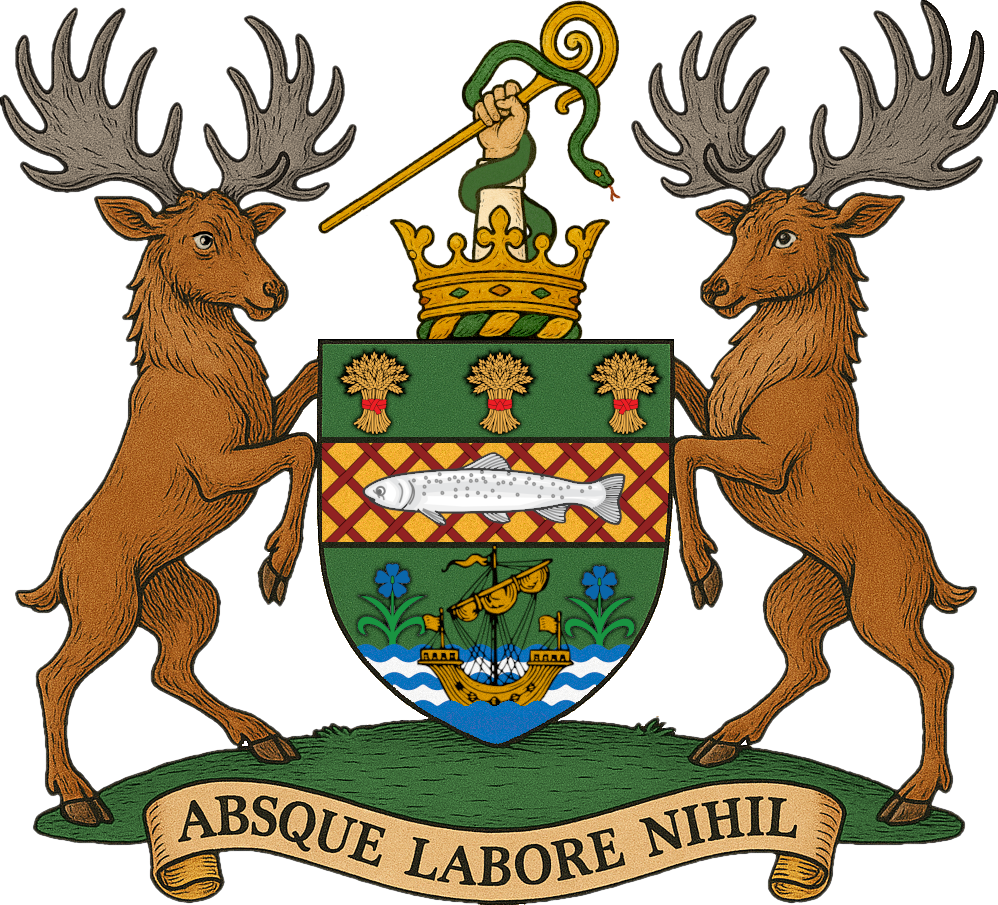
- Coat of arms
- Nickname: Mourne Country
- Motto: Absque Labore Nihil (Latin) "Nothing Without Labour"
- Country: United Kingdom
- Constituent Country: Northern Ireland
- Province: Ulster
- Established: Early 16th century
- County town: Downpatrick

Area
  - Total: 961 sq mi (2,489 km^{2})
- Highest elevation (Slieve Donard): 2,790 ft (850 m)

Population (2021)
  - Total: 553,261
  - Rank: 4th
- Time zone: UTC±0 (GMT)
  - Summer (DST): UTC+1 (BST)
- Postcode area: BT
- Contae an Dúin is the Irish name, Countie Doun and Coontie Doon are Ulster Scots spellings.

County Down (Irish: Contae an Dúin) is one of the six counties of Northern Ireland, one of the nine counties of Ulster and one of the traditional thirty-two counties of Ireland. It covers an area of 961 mi^{2} (2,490 km^{2}) and has a population of 552,261. It borders County Antrim to the north, the Irish Sea to the east, County Armagh to the west, and County Louth across Carlingford Lough to the southwest.

In the east of the county is Strangford Lough and the Ards Peninsula. The largest settlement is Bangor, a city on the northeast coast. Three other large towns and cities are on its border: Newry lies on the western border with County Armagh; Lisburn and Belfast lie on the northern border with County Antrim. Down contains the southernmost point of Northern Ireland (Cranfield Point) and the easternmost point of Ireland (Burr Point).

It was one of two counties of Northern Ireland to have a Protestant majority in the 2001 census. The other Protestant-majority County was County Antrim to the north. In the 2021 Census, it was the only county with a Protestant background majority, as Antrim has a Protestant background plurality. In the 2021 census, Ards and North Down had the highest number of "No Religion" responses (30.6%) for Northern Ireland.

In March 2018, The Sunday Times published its list of Best Places to Live in Britain, including five in Northern Ireland. The list included three in County Down: Holywood, Newcastle, and Strangford.

The county has two cities: Newry and Bangor. Bangor is the more recent, gaining city status in December 2022.

== Toponymy ==
County Down takes its name from dún, the Irish word for dun or fort, which is a common root in Gaelic place names, such as Dundee, Dunfermline and Dumbarton in Scotland and Donegal and Dundalk in the Republic of Ireland. The fort in question was in the historic town of Downpatrick, originally known as Dún Lethglaise ("fort of the green side" or "fort of the two broken fetters"). Another word for the county is "Downshire".

== History ==
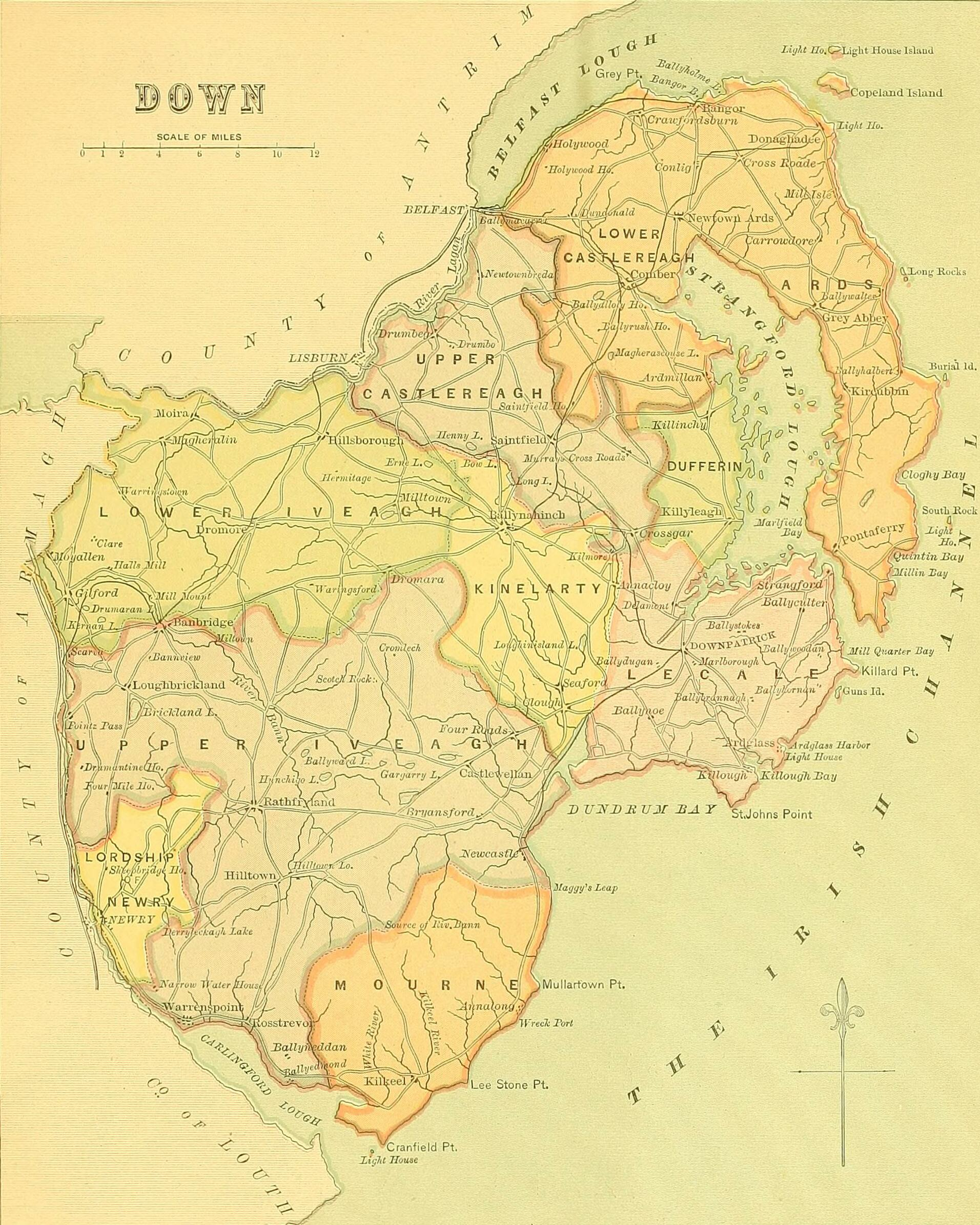
An 1885 map, with the county divided into baronies

In the 2nd century the region was home to the Voluntii tribe, according to Ptolemy. From the 400s–1177 County Down formed a central part of the kingdom of Ulaid. Ulaid was a frequent target of Viking raids in the eighth and ninth centuries. Fierce local resistance prevented the Norse from setting up permanent settlements in the region. In 1001, a fleet led by Sigtrygg Silkbeard raided much of the region in retribution for the Ulaiden's refusal to offer him sanctuary from Brian Boru the previous year.

The region was invaded by the Normans in 1177. From the 1180s–1600s the region saw waves of English and Scottish immigration. In 1569, the Irish Parliament passed "An Act for turning of Countries that be not yet Shire Grounds into Shire Grounds". In 1570, a commission was issued in pursuance of that statute "to survey and make enquiry in the countries and territories ... that are not shire ground, or are doubtful to what shire they belong; to limit and nominate them a shire or county; to divide them into countries, baronies or hundreds, or to join them to any existing shire or barony" "for the countries or territories of Arde, (Note: Ards (territory)) as well this side Blackstafe (Note: Blackstaff River) as the other side, Copelande islands, (Note: Copeland Islands) the Dufferin, (Note: Dufferin (barony)) Clandeboy, (Note: Clandeboye) Kilultoghe, the Glynes (Note: Glens of Antrim) with the Raughlines, (Note: Rathlin Island) Momerie and Carie, (Note: Cary (barony)) the Rowte M'William (McQuillan) (Note: Route, County Antrim) and all lands between lough Coine (Note: Strangford Lough) and lough Eaghe, (Note: Lough Neagh) and the water of Strangforde and the Banne. (Note: River Bann) To certify their proceedings before the 1st August."

The county was privately planted during the Plantation period (16th–17th centuries). During the Williamite War in Ireland (1689–1691) the county was a centre of Protestant rebellion against the rule of the Catholic James II. After forming a scratch force the Protestants were defeated by the Irish Army at the Break of Dromore and forced to retreat, leading to the whole of Down falling under Jacobite control. Later the same year Marshal Schomberg's large Williamite expedition arrived in Belfast Lough and captured Bangor. After laying siege to Carrickfergus, Schomberg marched south to Dundalk Camp, clearing County Down and much of the rest of East Ulster of Jacobite troops.

== Geography ==
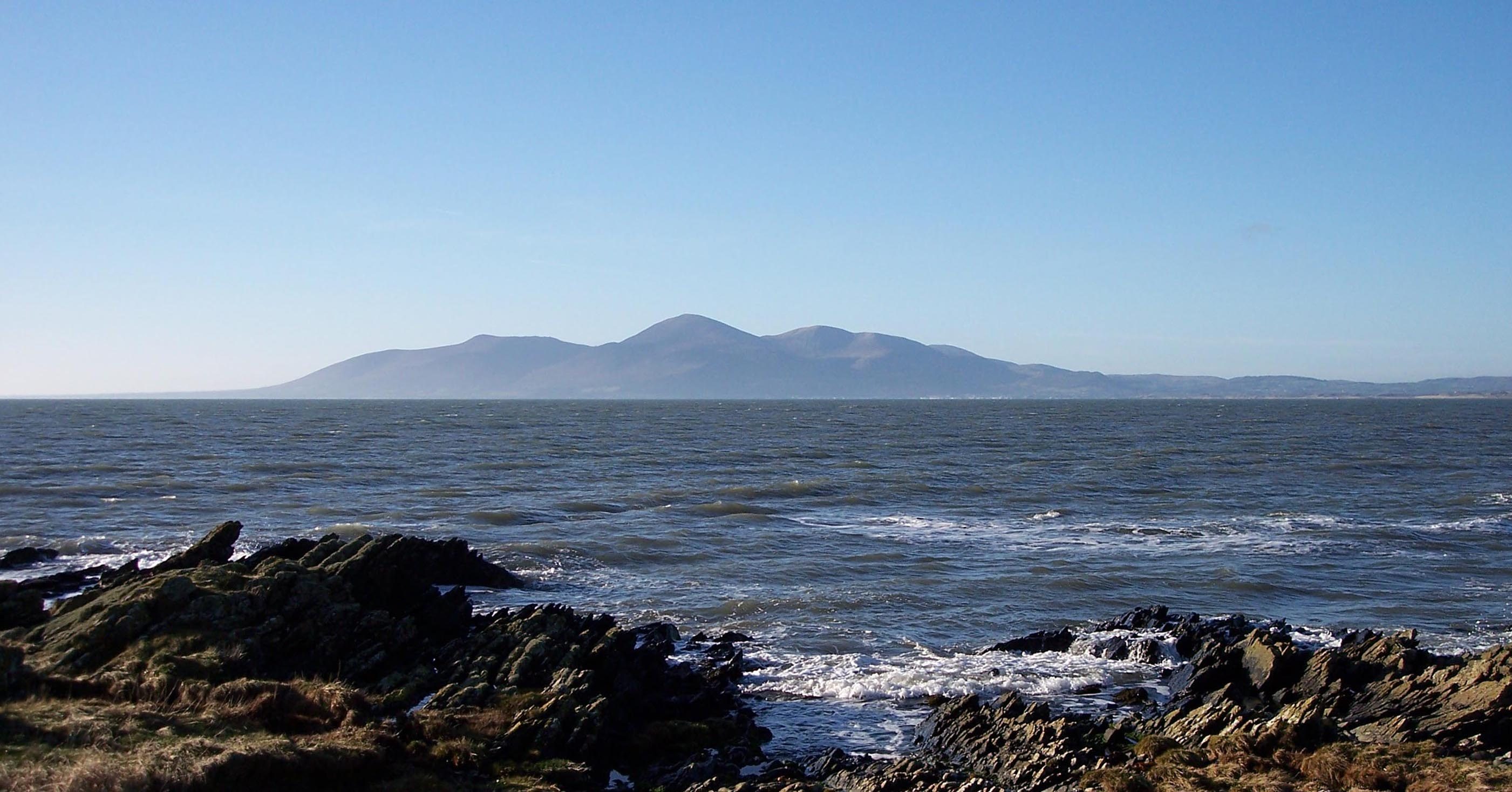
The Mourne Mountains

Down contains two significant peninsulas: Ards Peninsula and Lecale peninsula.

The county has a coastline along Belfast Lough to the north and Carlingford Lough to the south (both of which have access to the sea). Strangford Lough lies between the Ards Peninsula and the mainland. Down also contains part of the shore of Lough Neagh. Smaller loughs include Lough Island Reavy and Castlewellan Lake near Castlewellan, Clea Lough near Killyleagh, Lough Money and Loughinisland near Downpatrick and, within the Mourne Mountains, Silent Valley Reservoir, Ben Crom Reservoir, Spelga Dam and Lough Shannagh.

The River Lagan forms most of the border with County Antrim. The River Bann also flows through the southwestern areas of the county. Other rivers include the Clanrye and Quoile.

There are several islands off the Down coast: Mew Island, Light House Island and the Copeland Islands, all of which lie to the north of the Ards Peninsula. Gunn Island lies off the Lecale coast. There are at least seventy islands, several inhabited, and many islets – or pladdies – in Strangford Lough. Folk tradition says there are 365 islands in Strangford Lough, one for every day of the year.

County Down is where, in the words of the song by Percy French, "The mountains of Mourne sweep down to the sea", and the area around the granite Mourne Mountains continues to be known for its scenery. Slieve Donard, at 849 m (2,785 ft), is the highest peak in the Mournes, in Northern Ireland and in the province of Ulster. Another important peak is Slieve Croob, at 534 m (1,752 ft), the source of the River Lagan.

=== Places of interest ===
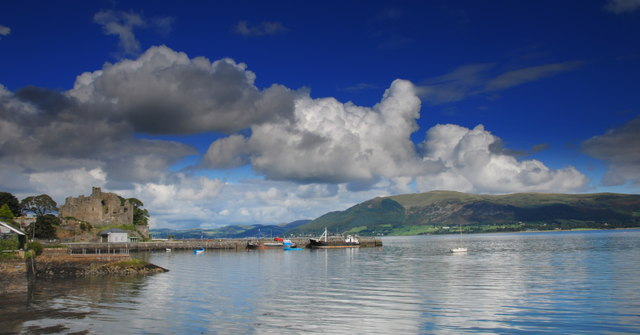
King John's Castle on Carlingford Lough.

- Saint Patrick is reputed to be buried at Down Cathedral in Downpatrick, reputedly alongside St. Brigid and St. Columcille.
- Saul, County Down (from the Irish: Sabhall meaning "Barn") – where Saint Patrick said his first eucharist in Ireland
- The city of Newry in the south of the county contains St Patrick's (Church of Ireland, 1578), overlooking the city centre from Church street, on the east side of the city, which is considered to be Ireland's first ever Protestant church. The Newry Canal is also the first summit-level canal ever to be built in the British Isles.
- Castlewellan Forest Park.
- Cloughmore (The Big Stone), a 30-ton Granite boulder lies on the Slieve Martin Mountain Ridge approximately 1000 ft. above Rostrevor village in Kilbroney Park.
- Royal County Down Golf Club is located in Newcastle, Newry, Mourne and Down. Golf Digest ranked it Number 1 on its 2024 World's 100 Greatest Courses list.
- Ballynoe stone circle is an ancient site dating back approximately 5,000 years to the late Neolithic and Early Bronze Age.
- Down is also home to Exploris, the Northern Ireland Aquarium, located in Portaferry, on the shores of Strangford Lough, on the Ards Peninsula.
- The Old Inn in Crawfordsburn is one of Ireland's oldest hostelries, with records dating back to 1614. It is predated however by Donaghadee's Grace Neill's which was opened in 1611. The Old inn claims that people who have stayed there include Jonathan Swift, Dick Turpin, Peter the Great, Lord Tennyson, Charles Dickens, Anthony Trollope, former US president George H. W. Bush, and C. S. Lewis, who honeymooned there.
- Tollymore Forest Park between Castlewellan and Newcastle.
- Scrabo Tower, in Newtownards, was built as a memorial to Charles Stewart, 3rd Marquess of Londonderry.
- An area of County Down is known as the Brontë Homeland (situated between Rathfriland and Banbridge, where Patrick Brontë had his church.) Patrick Brontë (originally Brunty), father of Anne, Charlotte, Emily and Branwell, was born in this region.

=== Subdivisions ===
Baronies

- Ards Lower (from the Irish: Aird)
- Ards Upper
- Castlereagh Lower
- Castlereagh Upper
- Dufferin (from the Irish: Duifrian)
- Iveagh Lower, Lower Half (from the Irish: Uíbh Eachach)
- Iveagh Lower, Upper Half
- Iveagh Upper, Lower Half
- Iveagh Upper, Upper Half
- Kinelarty (from the Irish: Cineál Fhártaigh)
- Lecale Lower (from the Irish: Leath Cathail)
- Lecale Upper
- Lordship of Newry
- Mourne (from the Irish: Múrna)

Parishes

Townlands

=== Settlements ===
Historical population
Year	Pop.	±%
1653	13,207	—
1659	15,183	+15.0%
1821	325,410	+2043.3%
1831	352,012	+8.2%
1841	361,446	+2.7%
1851	320,817	−11.2%
1861	299,302	−6.7%
1871	277,294	−7.4%
1881	248,190	−10.5%
1891	224,008	−9.7%
1901	205,889	−8.1%
1911	204,303	−0.8%
1926	209,228	+2.4%
1937	210,687	+0.7%
1951	241,181	+14.5%
1961	266,939	+10.7%
1966	286,631	+7.4%
1971	311,876	+8.8%
1981	417,978	+34.0%
1991	454,411	+8.7%
2001	489,004	+7.6%
2011	531,665	+8.7%
2021	553,261	+4.1%

==== Cities ====
(population of 75,000 or more at 2001 Census)

- Bangor
- Belfast – the eastern suburbs of the city lie partly in County Down but mainly in County Antrim
- Lisburn – the eastern suburbs of the city lie partly in County Down but mainly in County Antrim
- Newry – in counties Armagh and Down, divided by the Clanrye River

==== Large towns ====
(population of 18,000 or more and under 75,000 at 2001 Census)

- Dundonald
- Newtownards

==== Medium towns ====
(Population of 10,000 or more and under 18,000 at 2001 Census)

- Banbridge
- Downpatrick
- Holywood
- Carryduff

==== Small towns ====
(Population of 4,500 or more and under 10,000 at 2001 Census)

- Ballynahinch
- Comber
- Donaghadee
- Dromore
- Kilkeel
- Moira
- Newcastle
- Warrenpoint

==== Intermediate settlements ====
(Population of 2,250 or more and under 4,500 at 2001 Census)

- Ballygowan
- Castlewellan
- Groomsport
- Hillsborough
- Killyleagh
- Millisle
- Rathfriland
- Portaferry
- Portavogie
- Rostrevor
- Saintfield
- Waringstown

==== Villages ====
(Population of 1,000 or more and under 2,250 at 2001 Census)

- Annahilt
- Annalong
- Ardglass
- Ballyhalbert
- Ballywalter
- Crossgar
- Donaghcloney
- Drumaness
- Drumbeg
- Dundrum
- Gilford
- Greyabbey
- Helen's Bay
- Hilltown
- Kircubbin
- Magheralin
- Moneyreagh

==== Small villages or hamlets ====
(Population of less than 1,000 at 2001 Census)

- Atticall
- Annsborough
- Ballela
- Ballyhornan
- Ballykinler
- Ballynoe
- Bryansford
- Burren
- Cabra
- Carrowdore
- Clough
- Cloghy
- Crawfordsburn
- Dromara
- Gilnahirk
- Kilcoo
- Killinchy
- Killough
- Lawrencetown
- Leitrim
- Listooder
- Loughbrickland
- Loughinisland
- Mayobridge
- Saul
- Scarva
- Seaforde
- Sheeptown
- Strangford

== Demography ==
Religious Background in Down, 2021
Religion	Per cent
Protestant and Other Christian	53.5%
Catholic	32.3%
None	12.7%
Other faiths	1.5%

In the 2021 census, County Down had a population of 552,261, making it the second most populous county in Northern Ireland.

=== Community background and religion ===
Religion or religion brought up, 2021 Census.
Religion or religion brought up in	Number	%
Protestant and Other Christian	296,228	53.54%
Catholic	178,523	32.27%
None (no religion)	70,046	12.66%
Other religion	8,464	1.53%
Total	553,261	100.00%

=== National identity ===
National identity, 2021 Census.
National identity	Number	%
British only	208,523	37.69%
Irish only	102,174	18.47%
Northern Irish only	120,003	21.69%
British and Northern Irish only	58,256	10.53%
Irish and Northern Irish only	9,820	1.78%
British, Irish and Northern Irish only	12,605	2.28%
British and Irish only	4,421	0.80%
Other identity	37,459	6.77%
Total	553,261	100.00%
All Irish identities	131,143	23.70%
All British identities	290,524	52.51%
All Northern Irish identities	204,276	36.92%

=== Irish language and Ulster Scots ===
In the 2021 UK census in County Down:

- 8.04% claimed to have some knowledge of the Irish language. 2.35% claimed to be able to speak, read, write and understand spoken Irish. 1.15% claimed to use Irish daily. 0.13% claimed that Irish is their main language.
- 9.85% claimed to have some knowledge of Ulster Scots. 1.01% claimed to be able to speak, read, write and understand spoken Ulster Scots. 1.34% claimed to use Ulster Scots daily.

== Administration ==
The county was administered by Down County Council from 1899 until the abolition of county councils in Northern Ireland in 1973. County Down is now served by the following local government districts:

- Ards and North Down
- Newry, Mourne and Down (also serves part of County Armagh)
- Lisburn and Castlereagh (also serves part of County Antrim)
- Belfast (also serves part of County Antrim)
- Armagh City, Banbridge and Craigavon (also serves parts of County Armagh and County Antrim)

== Transportation ==
=== Railways ===
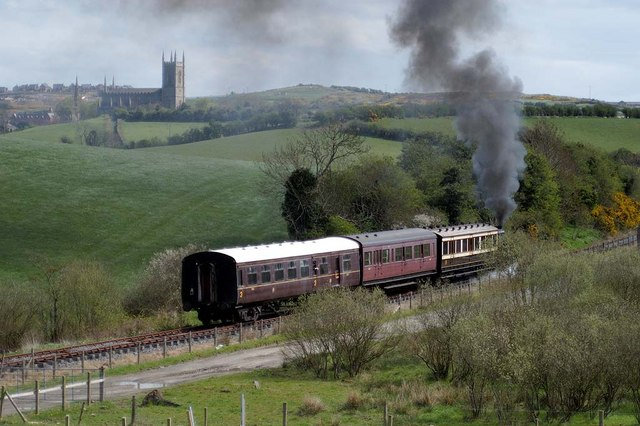
A steam train on the Downpatrick and County Down Railway travelling through the Ulster drumlin belt near Downpatrick.

Former railways within the county include the Great Northern Railway of Ireland and Belfast and County Down Railway, both of which were formed in the 19th century and were closed or amalgamated in the 1950s. The Downpatrick and County Down Railway operates a short section of the former Belfast and County Down line as a heritage railway between Downpatrick and Inch Abbey. The disused railway station at Ballynoe was part of the Belfast and County Down Railway, which connected Downpatrick to Ardglass in Northern Ireland.

Northern Ireland Railways operates the area's modern rail network.

== Sport ==
=== Association football ===
In association football, the NIFL Premiership, which operates as the top division, has three teams in the county: Newry City F.C., Ards F.C. and Warrenpoint Town F.C., with Banbridge Town F.C., Bangor F.C. and Lisburn Distillery F.C. competing in the NIFL Championship, which operates as levels two and three.

=== Gaelic games ===
The Down County Board administers Gaelic games in the county. Down is the most successful team north of the border in terms of All-Ireland Senior Football Championships won with five (1960, 1961, 1968, 1991 and 1994) in total. In terms of Ulster, they share that accolade with Cavan who also have 5 titles. They currently have four minor All-Ireland titles, twelve Ulster titles and one under 21 all Ireland title (1979). The Ards peninsula is a hurling stronghold.

=== Golf ===
County Down is also home to the No. 1 ranked golf course, Royal County Down Golf Club, in Ireland and Great Britain, according to Today's Golfer.

Former No.1 golfer in the world, Rory McIlroy, originates from Holywood, which is situated in the north of the county.

=== Horse racing ===
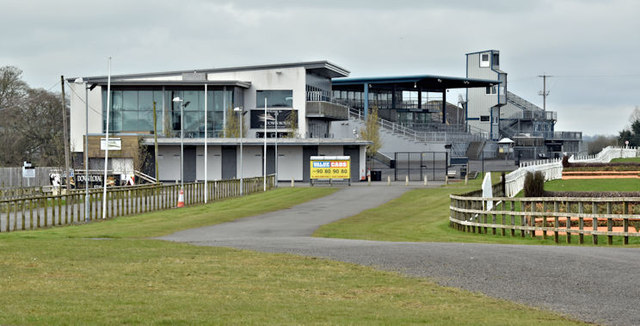
Down Royal Racecourse grandstand

The only two horse racing venues in Northern Ireland are located in County Down, Downpatrick Racecourse and Down Royal Racecourse in Lisburn. The Ulster Derby at Down Royal is Northern Ireland's most valuable flat race. Overall, the most valuable race at Down Royal is the Grade 1 BetVictor Champion Chase.

The first meeting at Downpatrick took place in 1685, in which King James II of England issued letters patent to establish The Royal Corporation of Horse Breeders in the County of Down. The feature race at Downpatrick is the Ulster Grand National, which attracts large crowds. It is the opener for the annual series of grand nationals in the British Isles.

=== Lawn bowls ===
Lawn bowls is historically a popular sport in County Down. Bowling clubs, overseen by the Northern Ireland Bowling Association include Dundonald, Newcastle, Comber, Saintfield, Knock, Dunbarton and Holywood Bowling Club.

== Parades ==
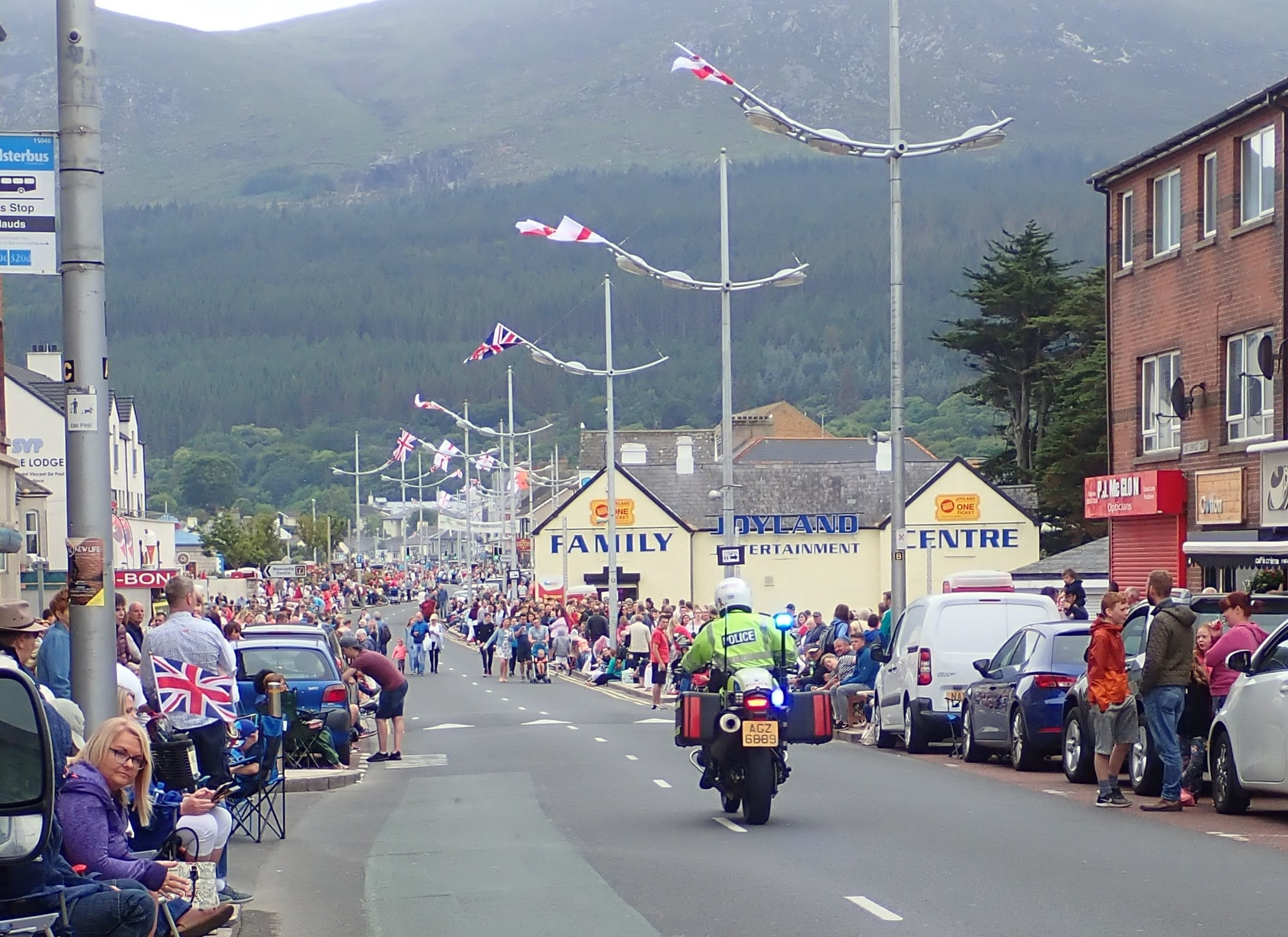
Twelfth of July parade in Newcastle, County Down

=== Orange Order ===
The County Down Grand Orange Lodge is a county Orange Lodge within the Orange Institution, which oversees all districts within the county.

There are five main Twelfth of July demonstrations hosted across the county. A town or village is chosen to host the parade by its regional district.

=== Royal Black Institution ===
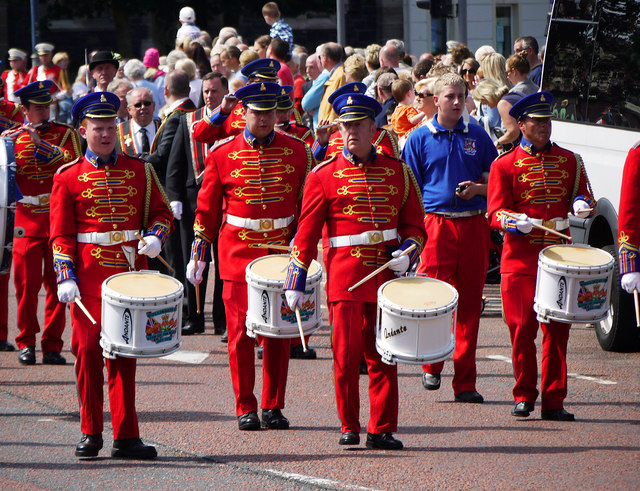
Royal Black Institution parade, Bangor, County Down

The following the Twelfth, the County Down village Scarva hosts the "Sham Fight" pageant and parade, which is organised by the Royal Black Institution. It draws tens of thousands of spectators and featuring over 70 marching bands accompanying thousands of members of the institution. A reenactment of the 1690 Battle of the Boyne takes place, where actors representing King William III and King James II engage in a duel.

The other location for the 13 July Royal Black Institution parade is Bangor, which is also a large parade. In 2026, 105 preceptories and 95 bands were in the parade.

=== Apprentice Boys of Derry ===
The County Down Amalgamated Committee oversees the Apprentice Boys of Derry lodges within the county. County Down is in rotation to host the Apprentice Boys Easter Monday Parade.

== In popular culture ==
"Star of the County Down" is a popular Irish ballad.

The Loyalist song "Build my Gallows" mentions the county. The conflict known as Battle of Dolly's Brae occurred in 1849 when Irish Catholic counter-protesters led to an outbreak of violence in the area during a Twelfth of July Orange walk.

The county is named in the lyrics of the song "Around the World", from the film Around the World in 80 Days, which was an American top ten hit for Bing Crosby and UK top ten hit for Ronnie Hilton, both in 1957, although it was Mantovani's instrumental version which was actually used in the film. Rihanna's video "We Found Love" was filmed there in 2011, causing complaints when the singer removed her clothes to reveal a bikini.

The singer Van Morrison has made reference to the County Down in the lyrics to several songs including "Northern Muse (Solid Ground)", "Mystic of the East" and the nostalgic "Coney Island", which names several places and landmarks in the county. Van Morrison also covered "Star of the County Down" with The Chieftains as a part of their collaboration album Irish Heartbeat.

C. S. Lewis, author of The Chronicles of Narnia, was inspired by the Mourne Mountains. There is a Narnia trail in Kilbroney Park, in Rostrevor.

Sam Hanna Bell based his novel of Ulster rural life, December Bride (1951) in the Ards peninsula. A film version of the novel, also called December Bride, was produced in 1990 and released in November 1991.

Several areas of County Down served as filming locations for the HBO series Game of Thrones including Castle Ward (Winterfell), Inch Abby (Riverlands), and Tollymore Forest Park.

The Academy Award-winning short film The Shore (2011) was filmed in and around Killough bay by director/writer Terry George and his daughter Oorlagh. The film starred Ciaran Hynds, Kerry Condon and Connleth Hill.

== Notable people ==
- Ash, rock band, from Downpatrick
- Paddy Ashdown, former Liberal Democrats (UK) leader, brought up near Comber
- Joseph Barcroft, scientist, Newry
- George Best, Northern Ireland footballer
- George Cassidy, jazz musician and music teacher
- Colin Blakely, actor, Bangor
- Patrick Brontë, father of the authors Charlotte, Emily, and Anne Brontë, Rathfriland
- James Dawson Burn, author and activist
- Thomas Campbell, co-founder of the Christian religious movement that led to a Protestant church in the United States, the Christian Church (Disciples of Christ)
- Comgall, saint and founder of the great monastery at Bangor
- Stephen Craigan, Motherwell and Northern Ireland defender, from Newtownards
- Jamie Dornan, actor in 50 Shades of Grey is from Holywood
- Garth Ennis, comic books author of Preacher and The Boys, brought up in Holywood
- Harry Ferguson, inventor of modern tractor, Dromore
- Brian Faulkner, Baron Faulkner of Downpatrick, last Prime Minister of Northern Ireland, Helen's Bay
- Patricia Ford, first female MP from Northern Ireland, Donaghadee
- Charlie Gallogly, Irish professional footballer for Huddersfield Town, Watford and Bournemouth.
- Keith Gillespie, former Manchester United & Newcastle professional footballer grew up in Bangor
- Craig Gilroy, Ulster Rugby winger, raised in Bangor
- Betsy Gray, heroine of the 1798 rebellion, Gransha, Bangor
- Bear Grylls, Chief Scout and TV personality, was raised in Donaghadee
- Frederick Hamilton-Temple-Blackwood, 1st Marquess of Dufferin and Ava, Governor-General of Canada, Viceroy of India, Clandeboye Estate
- Henry Harrison, Parnellite Member of Parliament, Holywood
- Sarah Cecilia Harrison, artist and first woman councillor to serve on Dublin Corporation, Holywood
- David Healy, Northern Ireland record goalscorer from Killyleagh
- Eddie Irvine, racing driver, Newtownards
- E. Neville Isdell, former chair and CEO of The Coca-Cola Company, Downpatrick
- Pat Jennings, former NI goalkeeper, is from Newry
- Patrick Kielty, comedian and television presenter, Dundrum
- Christine Lampard née Bleakley, TV Presenter was born in Newry and lived in Newtownards
- Gary Lightbody, lead singer of Snow Patrol, Bangor
- Kathleen Isabella Mackie (1899– 1996) painter and glider pilot
- Elizabeth McLaughlin, sculptor
- Josh Magennis, Professional footballer currently for Bolton Wanderers F.C. from Bangor
- James Martin, inventor of the ejector seat, from Crossgar
- Robert Blair Mayne, lieutenant colonel and commanding officer of the 1st SAS Regiment, Newtownards
- Aodh Mac Cathmhaoil, Roman Catholic Archbishop of Armagh and Primate of all Ireland, Saul, County Down
- Rhys McClenaghan – International gymnast from Newtownards
- Edward McGarry, Wisconsin politician
- Rory McIlroy, major champion golfer, from Holywood
- Deirdre McKay, composer
- F. E. McWilliam, sculptor, Banbridge
- Colin Middleton, Irish artist and surrealist, lived in Bangor
- John Mitchel, Irish nationalist, Young Ireland movement, Newry
- Colin Murray, sports TV Presenter, is from Dundonald
- Richard Murray, Provost of Trinity College Dublin 1795–1799, born in County Down
- Kristian Nairn, portrayed Hodor in Game of Thrones is from Lisburn
- Lembit Öpik, former Liberal Democrat MP and Shadow Welsh and Shadow Northern Ireland Secretary, Bangor
- Paul Rankin, TV chef, grew up in Ballywalter, Ards Peninsula
- Francis Rawdon-Hastings, 1st Marquess of Hastings, Governor-General of India, 1813–1823, Moira
- Margaret Ritchie, Baroness Ritchie of Downpatrick, former leader of Social Democratic and Labour Party and MP, Downpatrick
- Charles Russell, Baron Russell of Killowen, first Roman Catholic Lord Chief Justice of England and Wales, Newry
- Zoe Salmon, TV presenter and Miss UK contestant is from Bangor
- Neil Shawcross, artist, lives in Hillsborough
- Hans Sloane, founder of the British Museum, Killyleagh
- Robert Stewart, Viscount Castlereagh, British Foreign Secretary and diplomat at Congress of Vienna, brought up in family seat Mount Stewart
- David Trimble, former First Minister of Northern Ireland, former Ulster Unionist Party leader, Bangor
- Foy Vance, singer-songwriter, Bangor
- Charles Vane-Tempest-Stewart, 7th Marquess of Londonderry, Secretary of State for Air, Leader of the House of Lords, Mount Stewart
- Martin Waddell, author of children's books, lives in Newcastle, County Down
- Paddy Wallace, rugby union footballer for Ulster and Ireland, Dundonald
- Daniel Wiffen, swimmer, Olympic Gold Medalist for Ireland, Magheralin
- Thomas L. Young, U.S. politician, 33rd Governor of the State of Ohio, Killyleagh

== See also ==
- Abbeys and priories in Northern Ireland (County Down)
- List of archaeological sites in County Down
- List of places in County Down
- Lord Lieutenant of Down
- High Sheriff of Down
