= 101.1 FM =

FM radio frequency

The following radio stations broadcast on FM frequency 101.1 MHz:

== Argentina ==
- LRM944 in Esperanza, Santa Fe (it has assigned 101.3 MHz.)
- LRS774 in San Genaro, Santa Fe
- Calchaquí in Tafí del Valle, Tucumán
- del Sur in San Juan
- Oxigeno in Suardi, Santa Fe
- Planet Music in Mar del Plata, Buenos Aires
- Trentina in San Salvador de Jujuy, Jujuy
- Winner in Rosario, Santa Fe

== Australia ==
- 4QAA in Mackay, Queensland
- 3TTT in Melbourne, Victoria
- Triple J in Armidale, New South Wales
- Triple J in Wagga Wagga, New South Wales
- Triple J in Roxby Downs, South Australia
- Triple J in Mildura, Victoria
- Simple Of Dan¡ in Mildura, Victoria

== Belize ==
- KREM FM at Caye Caulker; Camalote Village; Dangriga, Stann Creek District

== Canada (Channel 266) ==
- CBCT-FM-1 in St. Edward, Prince Edward Island
- CBF-FM-10 in Sherbrooke, Quebec
- CBGA-FM-7 in Ste-Anne-des-Monts, Quebec
- CBMN-FM in Malartic, Quebec
- CBQV-FM in Sandy Lake, Ontario
- CBUK-FM in Kitimat, British Columbia
- CFAI-FM in Edmundston, New Brunswick
- CFIF-FM in Iroquois Falls, Ontario
- CFLZ-FM in Fort Erie, Ontario
- CFMI-FM in New Westminster, British Columbia
- CFPE-FM in Banff, Alberta
- CFTI-FM in Big Cove, New Brunswick
- CHFA-10-FM in Edmonton, Alberta
- CHFG-FM in Chisasibi, Quebec
- CHLI-FM in Rossland, British Columbia
- CHOX-FM-2 in Ste-Perpetue, Quebec
- CIFF-FM in Flin Flon, Manitoba
- CIQB-FM in Barrie, Ontario
- CICW-FM in Centre Wellington, Ontario
- CIXF-FM in Brooks, Alberta
- CJFY-FM-1 in Miramichi City, New Brunswick
- CJRI-FM-1 in Woodstock, New Brunswick
- CKBY-FM in Smiths Falls, Ontario
- CKBZ-FM-2 in Chase, British Columbia
- CKEY-FM in Fort Erie, Ontario
- CKMQ-FM in Merritt, British Columbia
- CKSJ-FM in St. John's, Newfoundland and Labrador
- CKXA-FM in Brandon, Manitoba
- VF2051 in Tumbler Ridge, British Columbia
- VF2151 in McBride, British Columbia
- VF2212 in Carrot River, Saskatchewan
- VF2327 in Bralorne, British Columbia
- VF2376 in La Ronge, Saskatchewan
- VF2584 in Rock Creek, British Columbia
- VF8023 in Aylesford, Nova Scotia
- VOAR-6-FM in Botwood, Newfoundland and Labrador

== Cayman Islands ==
- ZFKI-FM at Grand Cayman

== China ==
- CNR Music Radio in Nanning
- Maoming General Radio in Maoming

== Federated States of Micronesia ==
- BBC World Service at Pohnpei

== Israel ==
- Radio Eilat in Eilat

== Malaysia ==
- Kool 101 in Seremban, Negeri Sembilan (coming soon)
- Minnal FM in Johor Bahru, Johor and Singapore
- MY in Kuantan, Pahang
- Radio Klasik in Kota Bharu, Kelantan

== Mexico ==
- XHAT-FM in Ensenada, Baja California
- XHCSAJ-FM in Mazatlán, Sinaloa
- XHDN-FM in Gómez Palacio, Durango
- XHERW-FM in León, Guanajuato
- XHJHS-FM in Querétaro, Querétaro
- XHMA-FM in Zapopan, Jalisco
- XHMPO-FM in Ocampo, Coahuila
- XHPER-FM in Perote, Veracruz
- XHSJO-FM in Santiago Juxtlahuaca, Oaxaca
- XHSPRT-FM in Tapachula, Chiapas
- XHUANT-FM in Tepic, Nayarit
- XHVSS-FM in Hermosillo, Sonora
- XHWGR-FM in Monclova, Coahuila

== Philippines ==
- DWYS in Pasay
- Radyo Siram in Legazpi City
- DYIO in Cebu City
- DXRR-FM in Davao City (now Anchor Radio)
- DXTY in Zamboanga City

== United Kingdom ==
- Heart Scotland in Edinburgh and Rosneath
- Q Radio Newry and Mourne in Kilkeel and Newcastle, County Down
- Unity 101 in Southampton

== United States (Channel 266) ==
- KAKQ in Fairbanks, Alaska
- KBER in Ogden, Utah
- KBHP in Bemidji, Minnesota
- KBON in Mamou, Louisiana
- KBTP in Mertzon, Texas
- KCFX in Harrisonville, Missouri
- KCLP in Luverne, Minnesota
- KDBN in Parachute, Colorado
- KDDX in Spearfish, South Dakota
- KDSR in Williston, North Dakota
- KDXE in Cammack Village, Arkansas
- KEOJ in Caney, Kansas
- KEYF in Cheney, Washington
- KFHW-LP in Billings, Montana
- KFNF in Oberlin, Kansas
- KFUG-LP in Crescent City, California
- KFUR-LP in Saint George, Utah
- KHYL in Auburn, California
- KJBS-LP in Mena, Arkansas
- KJMS in Olive Branch, Mississippi
- KLAB in Siloam Springs, Arkansas
- KLIR in Columbus, Nebraska
- KLMD in Talent, Oregon
- KLOL in Houston, Texas
- KMGP-LP in Magnuson Park, Washington
- KNUT in Garapan-Saipan, Northern Mariana Islands
- KNVO-FM in Port Isabel, Texas
- KOHF-LP in Florence Community, Arizona
- KOHO in Leavenworth, Washington
- KONE (FM) in Lubbock, Texas
- KONO in Helotes, Texas
- KORL in Waianae, Hawaii
- KOSI in Denver, Colorado
- KPIN in Pinedale, Wyoming
- KPKK in Amargosa Valley, Nevada
- KPLD in Kanab, Utah
- KQDJ in Valley City, North Dakota
- KRIV-FM in Winona, Minnesota
- KRMD in Oil City, Louisiana
- KROW in Cody, Wyoming
- KRRK in Lake Havasu City, Arizona
- KRTH in Los Angeles, California
- KSFR in White Rock, New Mexico
- KTJN-LP in Gold Beach, Oregon
- KUHH-LP in Hilo, Hawaii
- KVIB-LP in San Diego, California
- KVLC in Hatch, New Mexico
- KVNM-LP in Veguita, New Mexico
- KVOK-FM in Kodiak, Alaska
- KVRO in Stillwater, Oklahoma
- KVXL-LP in Las Vegas, Nevada
- KWCA (FM) in Weaverville, California
- KWOX in Woodward, Oklahoma
- KWYD in Parma, Idaho
- KWYE in Fresno, California
- KXIA in Marshalltown, Iowa
- KXL-FM in Portland, Oregon
- KZCE in Cordes Lake, Arizona
- KZMT in Helena, Montana
- WAFT in Valdosta, Georgia
- WAVV in Naples Park, Florida
- WBEB in Philadelphia, Pennsylvania
- WBRU-LP in Providence, Rhode Island
- WBUG in Newport Village, New York
- WCBS in New York, New York
- WCID in Enfield, New York
- WDCK in Bloomfield, Indiana
- WDKK-LP in Hollywood, Florida
- WDVS-LP in Miami, Florida
- WDZP-LP in West Palm Beach, Florida
- WFGE in State College, Pennsylvania
- WFOO-LP in Providence, Rhode Island
- WGIR in Manchester, New Hampshire
- WHOT in Youngstown, Ohio
- WZPN in Glasford, Illinois
- WHSM-FM in Hayward, Wisconsin
- WHYA in Mashpee, Massachusetts
- WIAM-LP in Knoxville, Tennessee
- WICO-FM in Snow Hill, Maryland
- WIOE-FM in South Whitley, Indiana
- WIXX in Green Bay, Wisconsin
- WIZF in Erlanger, Kentucky
- WJFS-LP in Gatlinburg, Tennessee
- WJQY-LP in Wilson, North Carolina
- WJRR in Cocoa Beach, Florida
- WKQX in Chicago, Illinois
- WLIN-FM in Durant, Mississippi
- WLJA in Ellijay, Georgia
- WLVH in Hardeeville, South Carolina
- WNOE in New Orleans, Louisiana
- WOSA in Grove City, Ohio
- WPJM-LP in Palatka, Florida
- WPPG in Repton, Alabama
- WQON in Roscommon, Michigan
- WQZL in Belhaven, North Carolina
- WRIF in Detroit, Michigan
- WRIO in Ponce, Puerto Rico
- WRIZ-LP in Boca Raton, Florida
- WROQ in Anderson, South Carolina
- WRR (FM) in Dallas, Texas
- WSGS in Hazard, Kentucky
- WTEC-LP in Sarasota, Florida
- WTGA in Thomaston, Georgia
- WTTP-LP in Lima, Ohio
- WTUX in Machias, Maine
- WUBT in Russellville, Kentucky
- WUPY in Ontonagon, Michigan
- WVMG-LP in Chattanooga, Tennessee
- WVRE in Dickeyville, Wisconsin
- WVVX-LP in Providence, Rhode Island
- WVWP-LP in Wayne, West Virginia
- WWDC (FM) in Washington, District of Columbia
- WWOV-LP in Martins Ferry, Ohio
- WWPN (FM) in Westernport, Maryland
- WWUU in Washington, Mississippi
- WXEZ-LP in Hillsville, Virginia
- WXOS in East St. Louis, Illinois
- WXRM-LP in Cape May Court House, New Jersey
- WXJC-FM in Cullman, Alabama
- WYMY in Burlington, North Carolina
- WYOO in Springfield, Florida
- WZTZ in Elba, Alabama
