= Kilkeel (civil parish) =

Parish in County Down, Northern Ireland

Kilkeel is a civil parish in County Down, Northern Ireland. It is situated in the historic barony of Mourne.

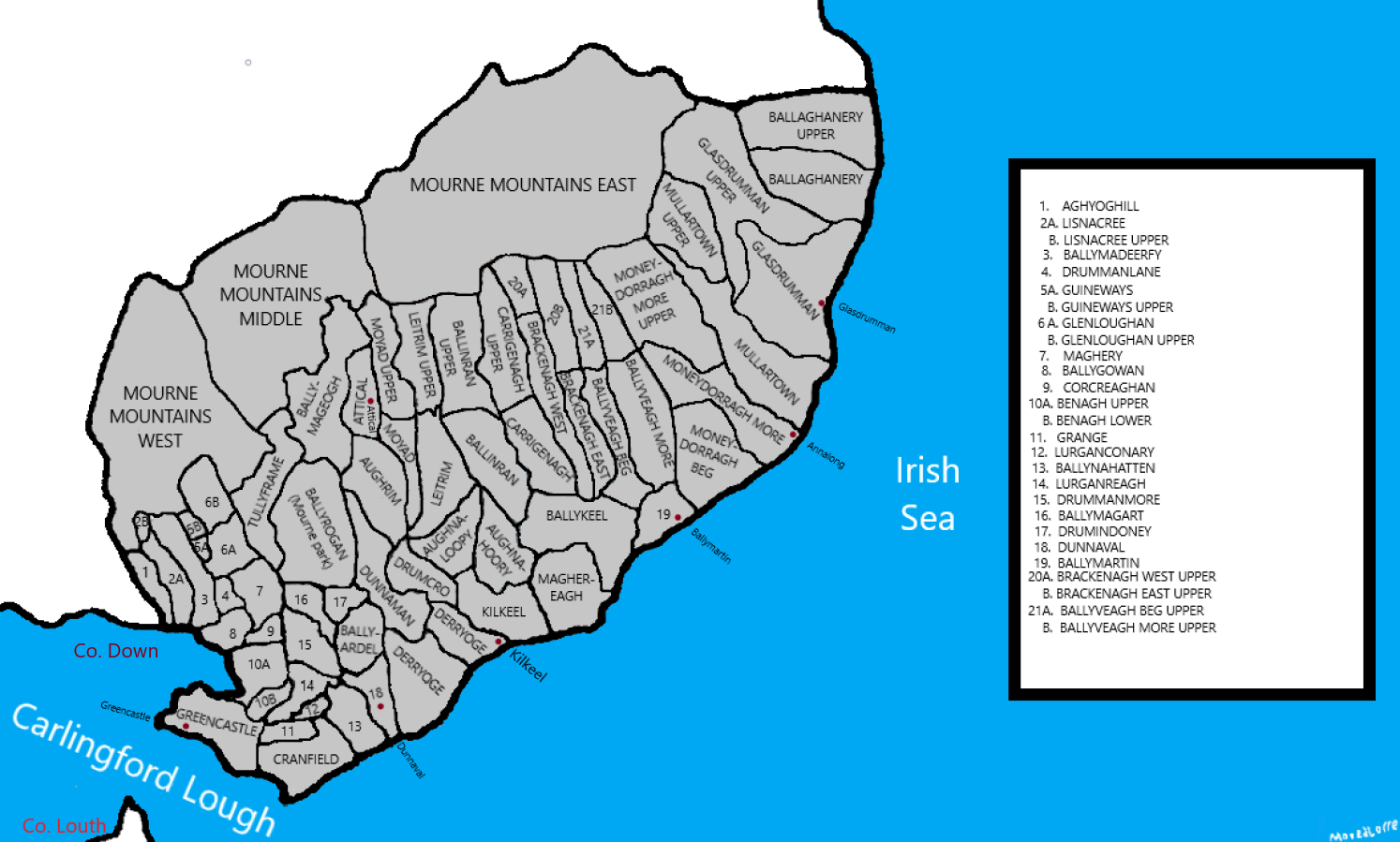
A map of Kilkeel civil parish.

== Settlements ==
The civil parish contains the following settlements:

- Annalong
- Atticall
- Dunnaval
- Kilkeel

== Townlands ==
Kilkeel civil parish contains the following townlands:

- Aghyoghill
- Attical
- Aughnahoory
- Aughnaloopy
- Aughrim
- Ballaghanery
- Ballaghanery Upper
- Ballinran
- Ballinran Upper
- Ballyardel
- Ballygowan
- Ballykeel
- Ballymadeerfy
- Ballymagart
- Ballymageogh
- Ballymartin
- Ballynahatten
- Ballyrogan (also known as Mourne Park)
- Ballyveagh Beg
- Ballyveagh Beg Upper
- Ballyveagh More
- Ballyveagh More Upper
- Benagh Lower
- Benagh Upper
- Brackenagh East
- Brackenagh East Upper
- Brackenagh West
- Brackenagh West Upper
- Carrigenagh
- Carrigenagh Upper
- Corcreaghan
- Cranfield
- Derryoge
- Drumcro
- Drumindoney
- Drummanlane
- Drummanmore
- Dunnaman
- Dunnaval
- Glasdrumman
- Glasdrumman Upper
- Glenloughan
- Glenloughan Upper
- Grange
- Greencastle
- Guineways
- Guineways Upper
- Kilkeel
- Leitrim
- Leitrim Upper
- Lisnacree
- Lisnagree Upper
- Lurganconary
- Lurganreagh
- Magheramurphy
- Maghereagh
- Maghery
- Moneydorragh Beg
- Moneydorragh More
- Moneydorragh More Upper
- Mourne Mountains East
- Mourne Mountains Middle
- Mourne Mountains West
- Mourne Park (also known as Ballyrogan)
- Moyad
- Moyad Upper
- Mullartown
- Mullartown Upper
- Tullyframe

== See also ==
- List of civil parishes of County Down
