= Moneydorragh More =

- Townland
- Area: 2.1 sq mi (5.4 km^{2})
- County: Down
- Country: Northern Ireland
- Sovereign state: United Kingdom

Moneydorragh More is a townland of 1344 acres in County Down, Northern Ireland. It is situated in the civil parish of Kilkeel, in the historic barony of Mourne. The majority of Annalong is within Moneydorragh More and it ranks as the 31st largest townland in County Down.

Moneydorragh More is bordered by Mullartown to the east, Ballyveagh More and Moneydorragh More Upper to the west, and to the south is Moneydorragh Beg.

== Longstone conflict ==
In the 1950s, the Longstone area of Moneydorragh More experienced tensions similar to the Drumcree conflict. In June 1952, Orangemen from Annalong held one of their annual parades, part of which would pass through the predominantly nationalist Longstone area. To prevent unrest, the Minister of Home Affairs, Brian Maginess banned the march. However, protests from Orangemen and Unionists led the Government to reverse its decision, allowing another Orange parade to proceed on 3 July 1952. Local nationalists blocked the route, and the RUC, lacking sufficient personnel, was unable to clear the way for the parade.

Subsequent parades were banned in the following years, but in 1955, an exception was made when the Mourne Twelfth was scheduled to be held in Annalong. That year, 15,000 Orangemen, led by local Unionist MP Brian Faulkner, marched twice along the contested route, protected by 300 RUC officers, many equipped with riot gear.

Tensions escalated on Easter Monday, 3 May 1956, when the local Ballyvea Flute Band received permission to parade from Ballyvea Orange Hall to Annalong, with the route passing through the Longstone area. Local nationalists blocked the road by using farm machinery to collapse boulder walls and hurled projectiles at the marchers. Despite the violence, the RUC managed to secure passage for the parade. In Easter 1958, another Orange parade passed through the area under the protection of 300 RUC officers.

== See also ==
- List of townlands of County Down
