= WTGA =

WTGA may refer to:

- WTGA (AM), a defunct radio station (1590 AM) formerly licensed to serve Thomaston, Georgia, United States
- WTGA-FM, a radio station (101.1 FM) licensed to serve Thomaston, Georgia
