= KSBP =

KSBP may refer to:

- KSBP-LP, a defunct low-power radio station in Parachute, Colorado, US
- San Luis Obispo County Regional Airport, California, US, ICAO code KBSP
