= WIAM =

WIAM may refer to:

- WIAM (AM), a radio station (900 AM) licensed to Williamston, North Carolina, United States
- WIAM-LP, a low-power radio station (101.1 FM) licensed to Knoxville, Tennessee, United States
