= Aghyoghill =

Townland in Northern Ireland

Coordinates: 54°4′15″N 6°6′27″W

Aghyoghill: Irish: Achadh Eochaille
- Location within County Down
- County: County Down
- Country: Northern Ireland
- Sovereign state: United Kingdom
- Postcode district: BT
- Dialling code: 028

Aghyoghill (from Irish Achadh Eochaille 'field of the yew-wood') is a rural townland in County Down, Northern Ireland. It has an area of 191.7 acres (0.78 km^{2}). It is situated in the civil parish of Kilkeel and the historic barony of Mourne, located 4 miles west of Kilkeel. It lies within the Newry, Mourne and Down District Council.

== See also ==
- List of townlands in County Down
