= Dunnaval =

Village in County Down, Northern Ireland

Coordinates: 54°02′46″N 6°02′02″W

Dunnaval: Irish: Dún Abhaill / Abhla ‘fort of the apple tree’
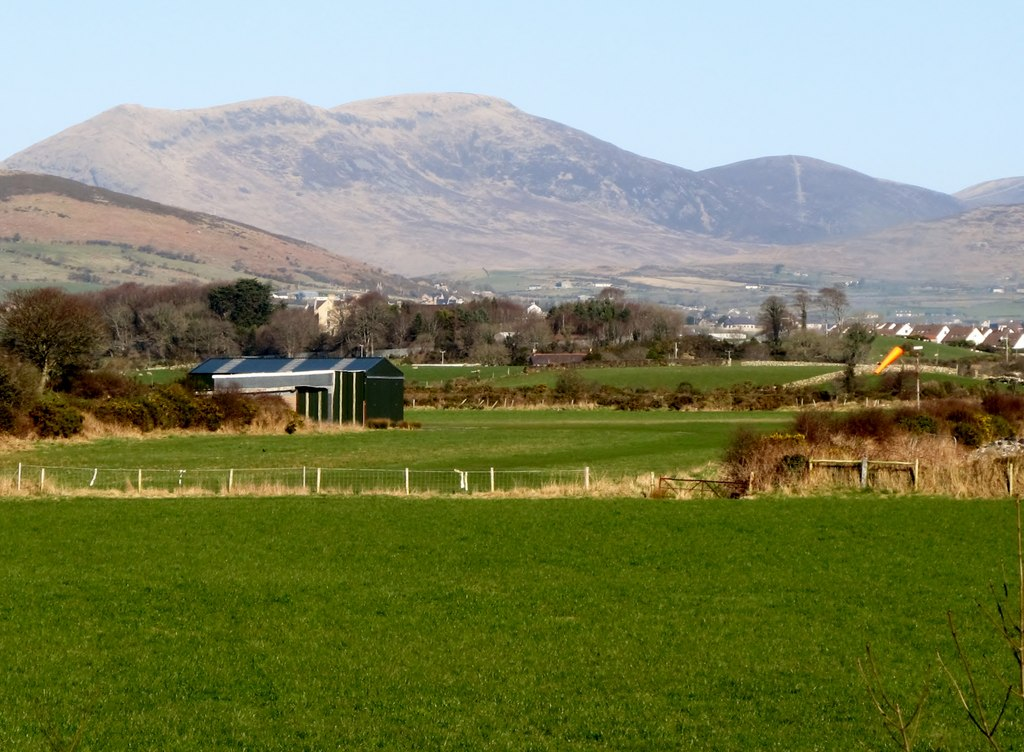
- Countryside at Dunnaval

- Location within County Down
- Population: 211 (2021 census)
- Irish grid reference: G289124
- District: Newry, Mourne and Down
- County: County Down
- Country: Northern Ireland
- Sovereign state: United Kingdom
- Post town: KILKEEL
- Postcode district: BT34
- Dialling code: 028
- UK Parliament: South Down
- NI Assembly: South Down

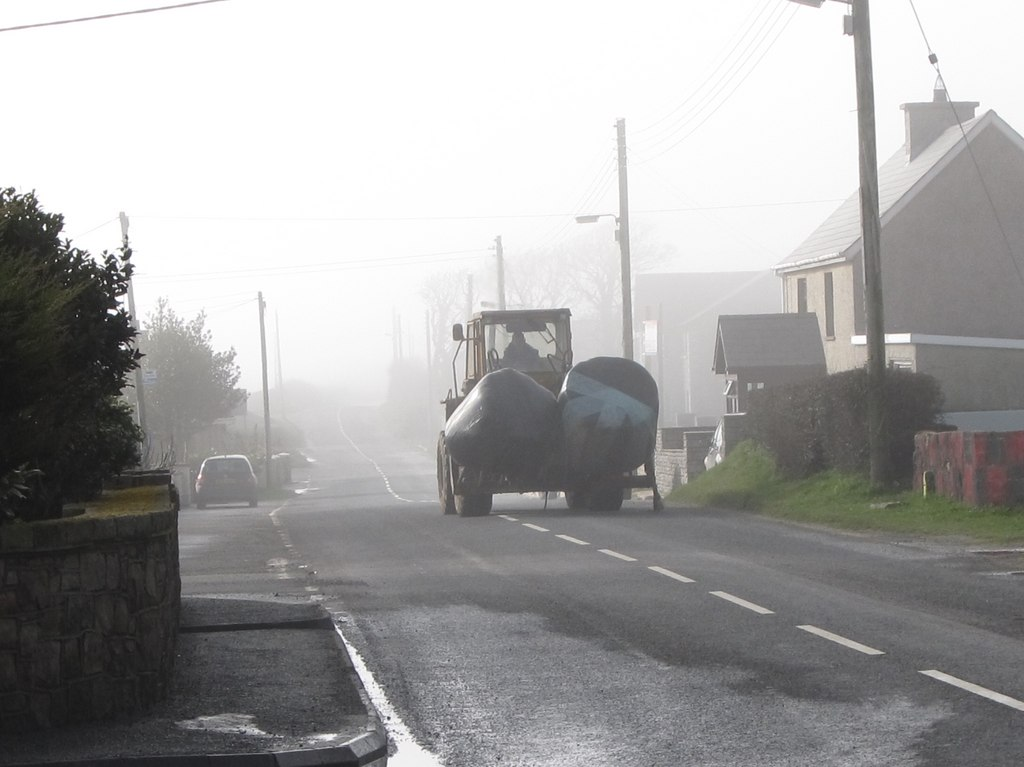
Greencastle Road, Dunnaval

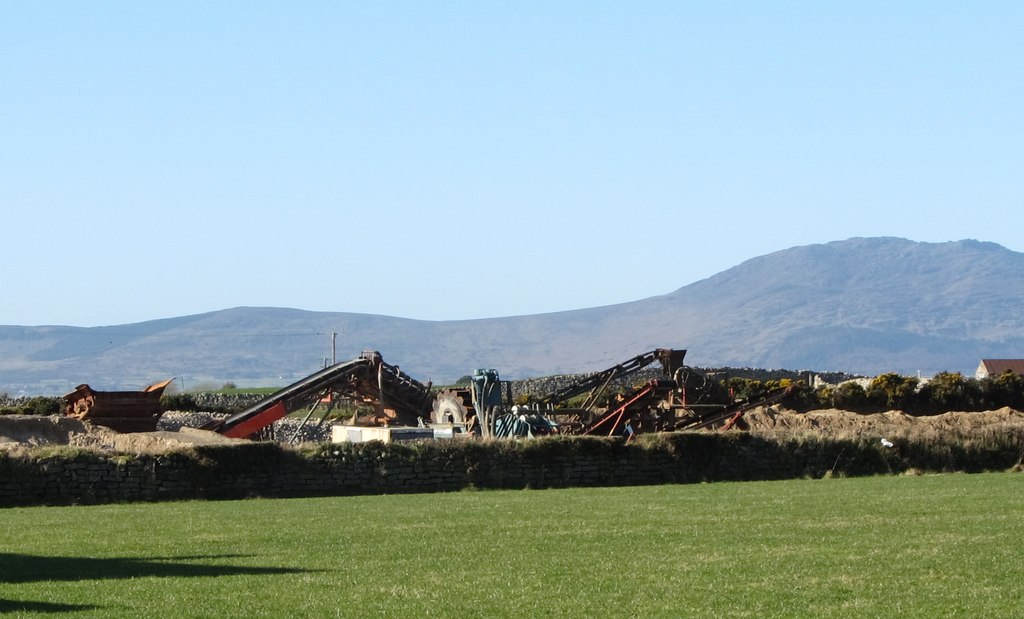
Sand quarry at Dunnaval

Dunnaval (from Irish Dún Abhaill, meaning 'stronghold of the apple-tree') is a small village and townland (of 273 acres) near Kilkeel in County Down, Northern Ireland. It is situated in the civil parish of Kilkeel and the historic barony of Mourne. In the 2001 Census it had a population of 147 people. It lies within the Newry and Mourne District Council area.

The pronunciation of the place name is important for understanding its origin. Locally, the stress is usually placed on the second syllable, which helps rule out some interpretations. For example, the suggestion that the name comes from Dún na bhFál ("fort of the enclosures") is unlikely, as this would require stress on the third syllable. Based on local pronunciation and historical spellings, the name is more likely derived from dún (meaning "fort") and abhall (meaning "apple tree"). It was known as Dunavill in the rent roll of 1688.

Townlands that border Dunnaval include:

- Ballyardel to the north
- Ballynahatten to the west
- Derryoge to the east
- Drummanmore to the west

== Archeology ==
The Dunnaval earthen fort is an ancient fortification constructed atop a prominent esker (a long, winding ridge formed by glacial activity). The fort has been carved directly into the top of this esker, occupying a commanding position midway between Greencastle and Kilkeel. From this vantage point, it offers strategic views over the surrounding landscape. The earthworks of the fort are significantly older than the nearby Greencastle Castle, which lies approximately 2.8 miles to the northeast and dates to the medieval period. In contrast, the fort's origins likely trace back to the Iron Age, making it a time-worn relic of early settlement and defence in the region.

== See also ==
- List of towns and villages in Northern Ireland
- List of townlands in County Down
- NI Neighbourhood Information System
