= XHOZ-FM =

XHOZ-FM may refer to:

- XHOZ-FM (Querétaro), Imagen 94.7 FM
- XHOZ-FM (Veracruz), Amor 91.7 FM
