= WFGH =

Radio station in Fort Gay, West Virginia

- Fort Gay, West Virginia; United States
- Broadcast area: Wayne County, West Virginia; Lawrence County, Kentucky
- Frequency: 90.7 MHz
- Branding: WFGH 90.7

Programming
- Format: Variety
- Affiliations: Fox News Radio; Westwood One

Ownership
- Owner: Superstation Network by Friends of WFGH Inc
- Sister stations: WVWP-LP

History
- First air date: 1973
- Call sign meaning: W Fort Gay High School

Technical information
- Licensing authority: FCC
- Facility ID: 71166
- Class: B1
- ERP: 7,800 Watts
- HAAT: 62 Meters
- Transmitter coordinates: 38°7′58.0″N 82°35′37.0″W

Links
- Public license information: Public file; LMS
- Webcast: WFGH Webstream
- Website: WFGH Online

WFGH is a Variety formatted broadcast radio station licensed to Fort Gay, West Virginia, serving Wayne County in West Virginia and Lawrence County in Kentucky. WFGH is owned and operated by Wayne County Board of Education under General Manager Fred Damron at Wayne High School. It was started by Hazel Damron in 1979 and has served Wayne County since.

The station went off the air due to budget cuts on July 1, 2017, but was immediately revived on July 3, 2017 by the community group Friends of WFGH.
