= Múrna =

Múrna may refer to the following:

- Mourne (barony), a former barony in County Down, Northern Ireland, known as Múrna in Irish
- The Múrna, spelt in Old Irish as Mughdorna, a people that gave their name to Mourne; see Mourne (barony)#The Múrna
- Muirne, the mother of Fionn mac Cumhail in the Fenian Cycle of Irish mythology
