= SS Connemara =

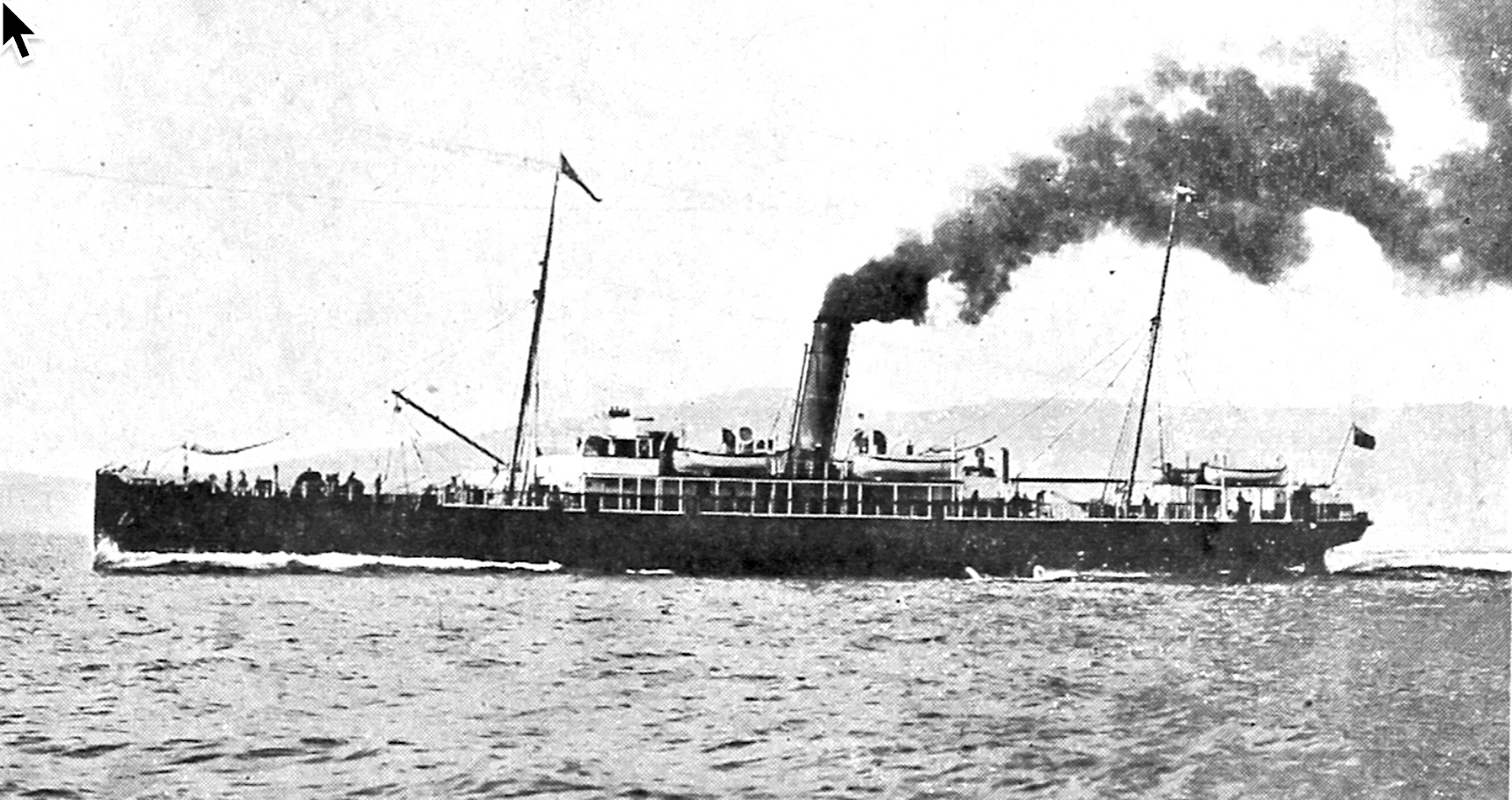

History
- Name: Connemara
- Namesake: Connemara
- Owner: London and North Western Railway
- Operator: London and North Western Railway
- Port of registry: UK
- Route: 1895–1902: Drogheda – Liverpool
- Builder: William Denny and Brothers, Dumbarton
- Yard number: 558
- Launched: 7 November 1896
- Fate: Sunk in collision 3 November 1916

General characteristics
- Tonnage: 1,106 GRT
- Length: 272.5 ft (83.1 m)
- Beam: 35.1 ft (10.7 m)
- Draught: 14.2 ft (4.3 m)

SS Connemara was a twin screw steamer, 272 feet (83 m) long, 35 ft (11 m) broad and 14 ft (4.3 m) deep with a gross register tonnage of 1,106. She sank on the night of 3 November 1916 at the entrance to Carlingford Lough, County Louth, Ireland after being hit amidships by the collier Retriever. 97 people died that night with only one survivor – a fireman on Retriever. The captain of Connemara was Captain G. H. Doeg. The captain of Retriever was Patrick O'Neill. Both men were experienced seamen and the incident was attributed to the atrocious weather conditions on the night.

== Sinking ==
=== Vessels involved ===
==== SS Connemara ====
- Ship type: Twin screw steamer
- Captain: GH Doeg
- Tonnage: 1106 gross register tons
- Built by: Denny Brothers of Dunbarton in 1897
- Owners: London and North-Western Railway Company
- Length: 272 ft (83 m)
- Beam: 35 ft (11 m)
- Draught: 14 ft (4.3 m)
- Crew: 30 (all from Holyhead in Wales)
- Cargo: 51 passengers (and livestock)

==== Retriever ====
- Ship type: Steel screw, three mast steamer
- Captain: Patrick O'Neill from Kilkeel
- Second Mate: Joseph O'Neill (Captain's son)
- Tonnage: 483 gross register tons
- Built by: Ailsa Shipbuilding Company in 1899
- Owners: Clanrye Shipping Company
- Length: 168 ft (51 m)
- Beam: 25 ft (7.6 m)
- Draught: 10 ft (3.0 m)
- Crew: 9 (all from Newry except the sole survivor James Boyle who was from Summerhill in Warrenpoint)
- Cargo: Coal

=== Previous accidents ===
Both Connemara and Retriever had been in separate collisions with other ships before the fatal incident:

- Connemara sank the Liverpool vessel Marquis of Bute on 20 March 1910.
- Similarly Retriever sank the Spanish ship Lista at Garston dock, Liverpool, on 31 August 1912.

=== Incident of 3 November 1916 ===
The incident occurred on 3 November 1916. The sea conditions at the time were "mountainous seas & dark conditions". There were gale-force winds from southwest against a strong ebb tide of approximately 8 knots (15 km/h; 9.2 mph). Retriever had departed Garston, Merseyside at 4 a.m. on Friday, and was headed to Newry. Connemara had departed Greenore (her berth) at 8 p.m., and was headed to Holyhead.

The outbound Connemara met the inbound Retriever approximately one-half mile (0.80 km) beyond the Carlingford bar. The bar in Carlingford is marked by Haulbowline lighthouse. Beyond the bar is the "cut" or channel, which in Carlingford's case is very narrow, being only about 300 yards (270 m) wide. This lack of space allows for very little manoeuvrability for passing vessels. Both vessels were showing dimmed lights, for fear of U-boats. Their masters were on their respective bridges, and there was no evidence to indicate they were not alert.

The watch at the Haulbowline lighthouse, seeing the ships too close for comfort, fired off rockets in warning. However, the atrocious conditions had caused Retriever's cargo to list. She was fighting both wind, tide and cargo inertia. She hit the Connemara on the port side, penetrating her hull to the funnel. Immediately Master O' Neill reversed engines and Retriever swung wide. Connemara however, was terribly ripped below the waterline on the port side, from bow to amidships. She sank within minutes, her boilers exploding on contact with the cold water. Retriever, with her bow stove in, took about 20 minutes to sink about 200 yards (180 m) from Connemara. Her boilers also exploded on contact with the water.

=== Aftermath ===
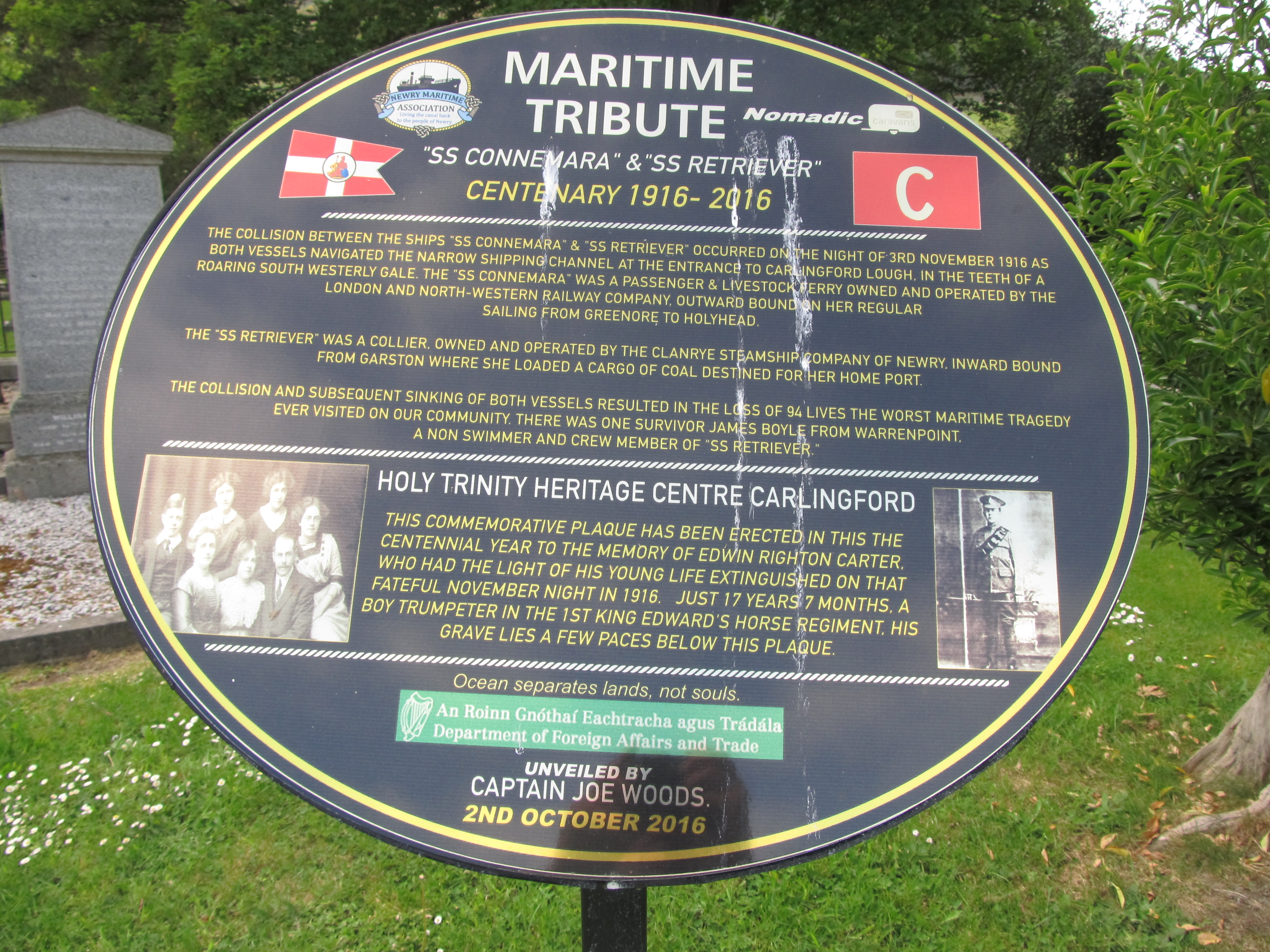
Memorial plaque in Carlingford, County Louth

There were 97 fatalities from the incident, with just one survivor. The nearby shorelines were "littered with corpses, dead animals and flotsam and jetsam". 58 bodies were found the next morning, with other bodies washing up over the following weeks from Cranfield to Kilkeel. Many of the corpses were badly mutilated and burned (due to the boilers exploding). The unidentified bodies were buried in a mass grave in Kilkeel.

An inquest was held on 6 November in Kilkeel. The coroner and members of the jury journeyed to the scene of the tragedy to view the wreckage and the bodies that had been collected. The sole survivor of the incident, James Boyle, a fireman aboard Retriever, gave his evidence breaking down several times. The verdict of the inquest was death by drowning caused by the collision of the ships.
