= Tullaghmurray Lass =

Coordinates: 54.060°N 5.993°W

The Tullaghmurray Lass was a prawn fishing boat based in Kilkeel, County Down, Northern Ireland.

On 14 February 2002 the Tullaghmurray Lass left Kilkeel Harbour to fish for prawns. When the boat failed to return when expected a huge search mission was organised involving local fishing boats, the RNLI, HM Coastguard, the Royal Navy and the Irish Navy. (including two helicopters, a Hawker-Siddeley Nimrod and the minesweeper HMS Bridport)

The extensive search continued for two months, the issue being raised in the Northern Ireland Assembly. Eventually the main body of the wreckage and the bodies of the three crew were recovered. The three victims were from the same family. Michael Greene (53), his son (33) and grandson (8), both of whom were also called Michael, died in the accident. Initial reports suggested that the sinking was caused by a collision with a larger vessel. However the official inquest found that a gas explosion on the boat causing huge damage caused it to sink. In the same year another Kilkeel boat was lost in Carlingford Lough, causing one death. The accidents raised safety fears on the Kilkeel fleet. In 2006 the death of two further fishermen aboard the Greenhill from nearby port Ardglass raised further concerns.
