= XHPER-FM =

Radio station in Perote, Veracruz

- Perote, Veracruz; Mexico
- Frequency: 101.1 MHz
- RDS: XHPER-FM
- Branding: La Inolvidable 101.1 FM

Programming
- Format: Romantic

Ownership
- Owner: Avanradio; (RRADIOTL, A.C.)
- Operator: Quatro Media Telecomunicaciones
- Sister stations: XHOZ-FM, XHGR-FM, XHDQ-FM,

History
- First air date: 2018
- Call sign meaning: PERote

Technical information
- Licensing authority: CRT
- Class: A
- ERP: 1,500 watts
- HAAT: -161.9 m
- Transmitter coordinates: 19°33′49.7″N 97°14′35.33″W

Links
- Webcast: Listen live
- Website: lainolvidabledeperote.com

XHPER-FM is a noncommercial radio station on 101.1 FM in Perote, Veracruz, Mexico. It is owned by Avanradio and operated by Quatro Media Telecomunicaciones and known as La Inolvidable 101.1 FM.

== History ==
XHPER received its concessions on February 29, 2016, and came to air in 2018.
