= XHDQ-FM =

Radio station in San Andrés Tuxtla, Veracruz

- San Andrés Tuxtla, Veracruz; Mexico
- Frequency: 103.9 MHz
- Branding: La Ke Buena

Programming
- Format: Regional Mexican
- Affiliations: Radiópolis

Ownership
- Owner: Quatro Media Telecomunicaciones; (Radiodifusion de San Andrés, S.A. de C.V.)
- Sister stations: XHOZ-FM, XHGR-FM, XHPER-FM,

History
- First air date: July 22, 1961 (concession)
- Former call signs: XEDQ-AM
- Former frequencies: 1360 kHz, 830 kHz

Technical information
- Licensing authority: CRT
- Class: B1
- ERP: 15 kW
- HAAT: 22.489 m
- Transmitter coordinates: 18°26′40″N 95°12′21″W

Links
- Webcast: Listen live

XHDQ-FM is a radio station on 103.9 FM in San Andrés Tuxtla, Veracruz, Mexico. It is owned by Quatro Media Telecomunicaciones and carries the La Ke Buena Regional Mexican format from Radiópolis.

The station began as an AM station in 1961, Francisco Ibarra López acquired in 1963 and Grupo ACIR was born in 1965; it was the company's first station and its smallest-market property. It migrated to FM in 2010. ACIR ceased operating XHDQ-FM on June 29, 2022, as part of a retreat from three stations in southern Veracruz. The station was then sold to Quatro Media, a Xalapa-based station group owned by Carlos Ferráez, and returned to the air.

== History ==
XEDQ-AM received its concession on July 22, 1961. It broadcast on 1400 kHz and was owned by Radio Ondas de los Tuxtlas, S.A. Two years later, on June 8, 1963, XEDQ was bought by Francisco Ibarra López, who in 1965 formed Grupo ACIR. By 1969, XEDQ had moved from 1400 to 1360; it would move to 830 sometime in the 1990s.

In 2010, XEDQ received authorization to move to FM.

In 2018, the station began using the Amor brand; it had already been using the format but branded as Radio Alegría with a retro logo calling to mind the ACIR logos of the 1980s, a nod to XEDQ's history as ACIR's first radio station.

Effective June 29, 2022, Grupo ACIR opted to shut down XHDQ-FM. The day before, XHOM-FM and XHNE-FM, the ACIR cluster in Coatzacoalcos, closed. The closure of the cluster caused the loss of 17 jobs.

On October 15 of the same year, a group led by Carlos Ferráez acquired XHDQ to be relaunched under the La Ke Buena grupera brand. The concession transfer finally completed by IFT in 2023.
