= XHUANT-FM =

Radio station in Tepic, Nayarit

- Tepic, Nayarit; Mexico
- Broadcast area: Tepic
- Frequency: 101.1 FM
- Branding: Radio UAN

Programming
- Format: Mexican college

Ownership
- Owner: Universidad Autónoma de Nayarit

History
- First air date: May 10, 2006
- Call sign meaning: Universidad Autónoma de Nayarit Tepic

Technical information
- Licensing authority: CRT
- Class: A
- ERP: 3 kW
- HAAT: 60 m (200 ft)
- Transmitter coordinates: 21°30′59″N 104°53′39″W

Links
- Website: www.radio.uan.mx

XHUANT-FM is a Mexican college radio station owned by the Universidad Autónoma de Nayarit in Tepic.

== History ==
XHUANT received its permit on May 10, 2006 and signed on that day.

Previous logo
