= XHGR-FM =

Radio station in Xalapa, Veracruz

- Xalapa, Veracruz; Mexico
- Frequency: 104.1 FM
- Branding: Los 40

Programming
- Format: English and spanish Top 40
- Affiliations: Radiópolis

Ownership
- Owner: Quatro Media Telecomunicaciones; (GR Radio, S.A. de C.V.)
- Sister stations: XHOZ-FM, XHPER-FM, XHDQ-FM

History
- First air date: December 21, 1957 (concession)
- Former call signs: XEGR-AM
- Former frequencies: 1160 kHz

Technical information
- Licensing authority: CRT
- Class: B1
- ERP: 25 kW
- HAAT: 137.20 m
- Transmitter coordinates: 19°32′21″N 96°54′20″W

Links
- Webcast: Listen live
- Website: los40xalapa.com

XHGR-FM is a radio station on 104.1 FM in Xalapa, Veracruz. It is owned by Quatro Media Telecomunicaciones and carries the Los 40 english and spanish top 40 format from Radiópolis.

== History ==
XEGR-AM 1160 received its concession on December 21, 1957. It was based in Coatepec and broadcast with 1,000 watts as a daytimer. By the late 1960s, XEGR had moved to 1040; power was raised to 2,500 watts (with 1,000 watts night) in the 1990s.

XEGR was authorized to move to FM in November 2010. On April 1, 2019, it changed from "OK! FM" to Los 40.

Avanradio sold the station to Quatro Media Telecomunicaciones in late October 2022.
