= XHOZ-FM (Veracruz) =

Radio station in Xalapa, Veracruz, Mexico

- Xalapa, Veracruz; Mexico
- Frequency: 91.7 MHz
- Branding: Amor

Programming
- Format: Romantic

Ownership
- Owner: Quatro Media Telecomunicaciones; (OZ Radio, S.A. de C.V.)
- Sister stations: XHGR-FM, XHPER-FM, XHDQ-FM

History
- First air date: October 7, 1993 (concession)
- Former call signs: XEOZ-AM
- Former frequencies: 960 kHz

Technical information
- Licensing authority: CRT
- Class: B1
- ERP: 10,000 watts
- HAAT: 142.40 m

Links
- Webcast: Listen live
- Website: amor917xalapa.com

XHOZ-FM is a radio station in Xalapa, Veracruz, Mexico. Broadcasting on 91.7 FM, XHOZ is owned by Quatro Media Telecomunicaciones and carries a romantic format known as Amor 91.7.

== History ==
The concession for XEOZ-AM 960 was awarded to Luis Ignacio Santibañez Patiño on January 16, 1946, with the current concessionaire being created in 1983. In 1994, the station gained its FM counterpart and adopted the ACIR Satélite contemporary hit music format. The station then transitioned to the Amor romantic music format in the early 2000s.

On October 27, 2022, the station's air staff announced their departure. Carlos Ferráez then took over operations on November 1, initially retaining the Amor name and branding used by ACIR. The change followed the sale or shutdown of five other ACIR stations across Veracruz during 2022, the concession transfer was approved by the IFT on May 24, 2023.

On September 21, 2023, OZ Radio, S.A. de C.V., surrendered the station's authority to operate on AM, becoming an FM-only station.
