= WTGA (AM) =

Thomaston, Georgia; United States
- Frequency: 1590 kHz

Programming
- Format: Defunct (formerly Soft Adult Contemporary)
- Affiliations: AP Radio, Jones Radio Network

Ownership
- Owner: Radio Georgia, Inc.

History
- Last air date: September 28, 2015

Technical information
- Facility ID: 54589
- Class: D
- Power: 500 watts day 25 watts night
- Transmitter coordinates: 32°53′45.00″N 84°18′10.00″W

WTGA (1590 AM) was a radio station broadcasting a Soft Adult Contemporary format. Licensed to Thomaston, Georgia, United States, the station was owned by Radio Georgia, Inc. and featured programming from AP Radio and Jones Radio Network.

The license for WTGA was deleted by the Federal Communications Commission on September 28, 2015.
