= CFTI-FM =

First Nations radio station in Elsipogtog First Nation, Canada

Coordinates: 46°35′09″N 64°59′38″W

- Elsipogtog First Nation, New Brunswick; Canada
- Frequency: 101.1 MHz FM

Programming
- Format: Community Radio, Mi'kmaq

Ownership
- Owner: Native Broadcasting Ltd.

CFTI-FM is a half Mi'kmaq, half English radio station licensed to Elsipogtog First Nation, New Brunswick, and can be heard at 101.1 MHz/FM. The station is owned by Native Broadcasting Ltd.

== History ==
On November 28, 1994, Melvin Augustine (on behalf of a not-for-profit organization) received approval by the Canadian Radio-television and Telecommunications Commission (CRTC) to operate a new native-language radio station at Big Cove, New Brunswick on the frequency of 101.5 MHz. On February 25, 1998, the station received approval to change CFTI-FM's frequency from 101.5 MHz to 101.1 MHz and to increase the effective radiated power from 3 watts to 50 watts.

On August 29, 2008, the CRTC approved Melvin Augustine's application for a one-year license renewal from September 1, 2008 to August 31, 2009. There are no known license renewals since 2009 and is uncertain of when the station may have left the air.

== Notes ==
The call letters "CFTI" was a former callsign that was used at a radio station in Timmins, Ontario from 1976 to 1992 and is known today as CJQQ-FM. CFTI-FM/CJQQ-FM Timmins has no relation to the current CFTI-FM in Big Cove.
