= WXEZ-LP =

- Hillsville, Virginia; United States
- Broadcast area: Hillsville, Virginia
- Frequency: 101.1 MHz

Programming
- Format: Adult contemporary

Ownership
- Owner: Community Broadcasting of Hillsville

History
- First air date: 2002
- Former call signs: WWZE-LP (2002–2009)

Technical information
- Licensing authority: FCC
- Facility ID: 127052
- Class: L1
- ERP: 52 watts
- HAAT: 42 Meters
- Transmitter coordinates: 36°44′29.0″N 80°43′26.0″W

Links
- Public license information: LMS

WXEZ-LP is an adult contemporary-formatted broadcast radio station licensed to Hillsville, Virginia. WXEZ-LP's signal, due to its low power, only reaches about 2 miles outside the Hillsville city limits, although it does cover the entire town of Hillsville.

WXEZ-LP is owned and operated by Community Broadcasting of Hillsville.
