= WJFS-LP =

- Gatlinburg, Tennessee; United States
- Broadcast area: Gatlinburg, Tennessee; Pigeon Forge, Tennessee
- Frequency: 101.1 MHz
- Branding: 101.1 The Way

Programming
- Format: Christian radio

Ownership
- Owner: Gatlinburg Church of Christ

History
- First air date: April 2015

Technical information
- Licensing authority: FCC
- Facility ID: 195104
- ERP: 100 watts
- HAAT: 29.06 m (95.3 ft)
- Transmitter coordinates: 35°44′43″N 83°28′7″W

Links
- Public license information: LMS
- Website: Gatlinburg Church of Christ Website

WJFS-LP is a low-powered radio station broadcasting at 101.1 megahertz on the FM dial. It is a radio service of the Gatlinburg Church of Christ, providing gospel music and audio broadcasts of all worship services.

== History ==
The station held its inaugural broadcast from the Gatlinburg Church of Christ in April 2015. The following year, the church and station were both destroyed in the November 2016 Great Smoky Mountains wildfires. The station returned to air in April 2017.
