= KFUG-LP =

- Crescent City, California; United States
- Frequency: 101.1 MHz

Programming
- Languages: English; Spanish
- Format: Community radio

Ownership
- Owner: KFUG Community Radio Inc.

History
- First air date: September 21, 2015
- Former call signs: KFDG-LP (2015)

Technical information
- Licensing authority: FCC
- Facility ID: 196881
- Class: L1
- ERP: 100 watts
- HAAT: -19.7 meters (-64.632 feet)
- Transmitter coordinates: 41°45′9.42″N 124°11′52.24″W

Links
- Public license information: LMS
- Webcast: Listen live
- Website: kfugradio.org

KFUG-LP is a low-power community radio station broadcasting from Crescent City, California.

== History ==
KFUG-LP began broadcasting as KFDG-LP on September 21, 2015, switching to its current call sign a little over a month later on October 22, 2015.

In 2017, KFUG-LP was granted a Federal Communications Commission construction permit to move to a new transmitter site, but without any change in the station's effective radiated power.
