= Annalong =

Village in County Down, Northern Ireland

Coordinates: 54.108°N 5.901°W

Annalong: Irish: Áth na Long
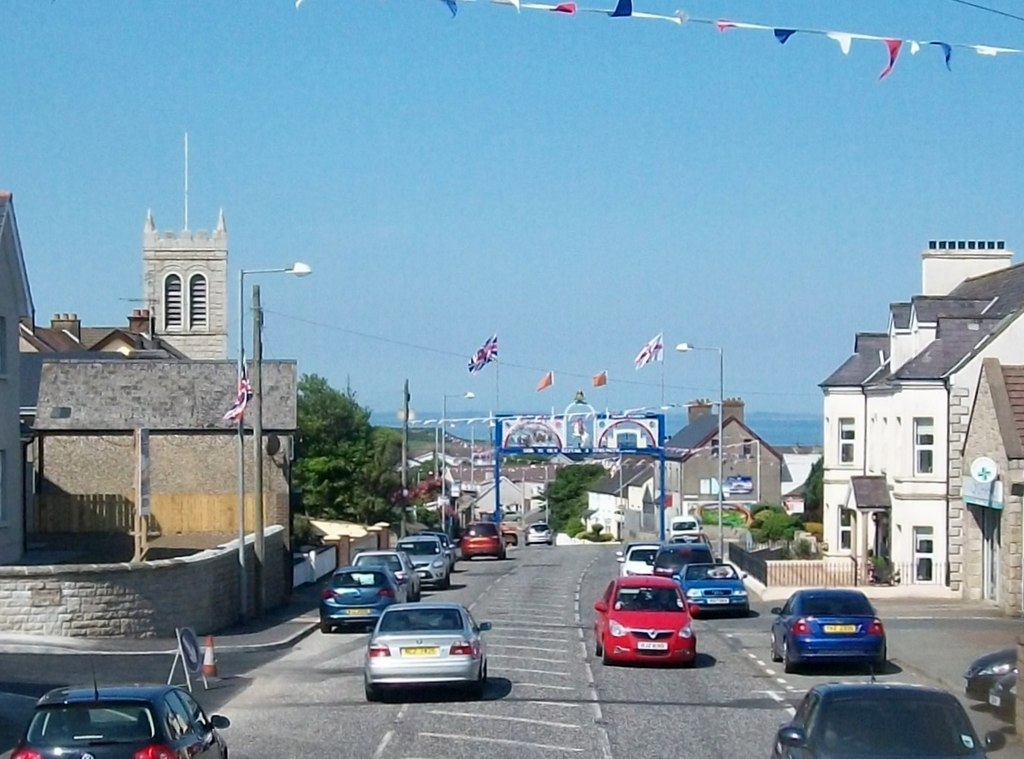
- Annalong, 1st July 2014

- Location within County Down
- Population: 2,037 (2021 census)
- District: Newry and Mourne
- County: County Down
- Country: Northern Ireland
- Sovereign state: United Kingdom
- Post town: NEWRY
- Postcode district: BT34
- Dialling code: 028
- Police: Northern Ireland
- Fire: Northern Ireland
- Ambulance: Northern Ireland
- UK Parliament: South Down
- NI Assembly: South Down

Annalong (from Irish Áth na Long, meaning 'ford of the ships') is a seaside village in County Down, Northern Ireland. It is at the foot of the Mourne Mountains, 8 miles (13 km) south of Newcastle. Annalong is in the civil parish of Kilkeel, the barony of Mourne, and the Newry and Mourne District Council area. It had a population of 2,037 at the 2021 census. The village formerly exported dressed granite and is now a fishing and holiday resort.

== History ==
In the census report of 1659, Annalong is referred to as a 'quarter' - a sub-division of a townland - in this case Moneydarraghmore. Like practically every locality in Mourne, the name derives from the Irish Celtic (Gaelic) - Ath na Long. This means 'the ford of the ships' - a reference to some crossing on the river near where it enters the harbour. It likely relates to around a thousand years ago when the Viking longships found some shelter at the mouth of the river. There is no material evidence of the Vikings ever having settled here. However, there are some words in the local dialect which would appear to suggest Norse influence, such as; 'selk', the local name for the common seal; to 'set allow' is to set on fire; to 'hain' is to eke out; 'holm' refers to low-lying land close to the river.

On 13 January 1843, fishing boats from Newcastle and Annalong set out for the usual fishing stations but were caught in a gale. Fourteen boats were lost in the heavy seas, including a boat that had come to the rescue. Only two boats survived, the Victoria and the Brothers. In all, 76 men perished, 30 of them from Annalong.

It is estimated that around 250 men from Annalong served in the Great War (1914–1918). These men were all volunteers, as conscription was only applied to Great Britain, not Ireland.

== Places of interest ==
=== Annalong Cornmill ===
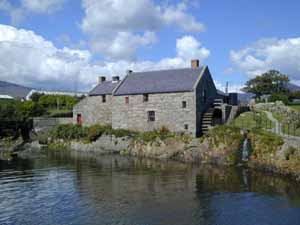
Annalong Cornmill

Annalong Cornmill was built in the 19th century and operated until the 1960s, and was one of the last working watermills in Northern Ireland. It contains a grain drying kiln and three pairs of millstones. It is powered by a 15 ft water wheel and a 1920s Marshall "hot-bulb" 20hp engine. Restoration began in 1983 after it was acquired by Newry and Mourne District Council, and it reopened in 1985.

=== Annalong Harbour ===
Annalong Harbour was enlarged in the 1880s to cope with the increased granite exports. A purpose-built standard gauge railway was built to transport almost all of the material for the construction of the reservoir.

=== Annalong Holiday Park ===
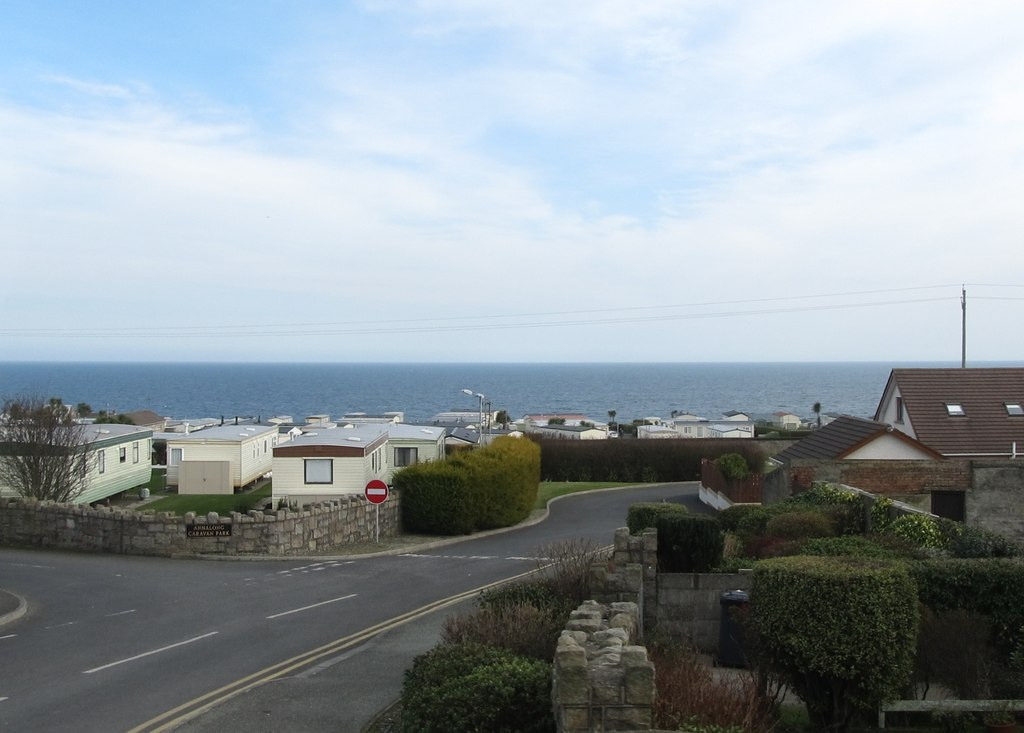
Annalong Holiday Park

Annalong Holiday Park is a caravan park owned by Chestnutt Holiday Parks located in the centre of the village. Moneydarragh Hub is a social centre offering classes, well-being and business collaboration.

=== Annalong Coastguard Station ===
Annalong Coastguard Station has a long history tied to maritime safety and smuggling prevention along the Mourne coast.

Before the establishment of a formal coastguard station in the early 1820s, the area served as a Preventative Water Guard station from 1809 and as a revenue establishment dating back to the 1790s. Prior to this, revenue operations had been based further inland in the townland of Ballyveagh, approximately 1.25 miles from the coast.

The relocation to the shoreline was prompted by a tragic incident in which a revenue officer was mistakenly shot and killed, the intended target having been a Coast Officer named Captain Alexander Chesney. This led to the establishment of a new site at a location known as Prospect, in the townland of Moneydarragh More, southwest of Annalong.

With the foundation of the Coastguard service in 1822, the Prospect site and its boat crew were officially transferred from the Water Guard. While a staff of 12 men was initially recommended, by 1834 the team had been reduced to a Chief Officer and seven men. Staffing rose again to ten by 1868. The Annalong Coastguard Station continued to operate from Prospect until its relocation to Newcastle in 1935.

A related and historically significant structure is the Annalong Coastguard Tower, also known as the Rocket House or the Rocket Tower. Constructed in the 1850s, it is a B1 grade listed building and a rare surviving example of a coastal rescue facility that retains much of its original vernacular character, including an intact interior. It is believed to be the only remaining rocket station in Northern Ireland.

The most distinctive feature is the two-storey square tower, which once served as a pigeon loft. The pigeons housed here were used as couriers for communication between Coastguard stations, a feature unique to the Annalong site. The adjoining garage housed a rocket launcher, which was used to fire ropes to vessels that had run aground - a common occurrence during the peak of smuggling activity in the 18th and 19th centuries.

Despite being derelict, the site is significant in the history of local navigation and the development of Annalong Harbour.

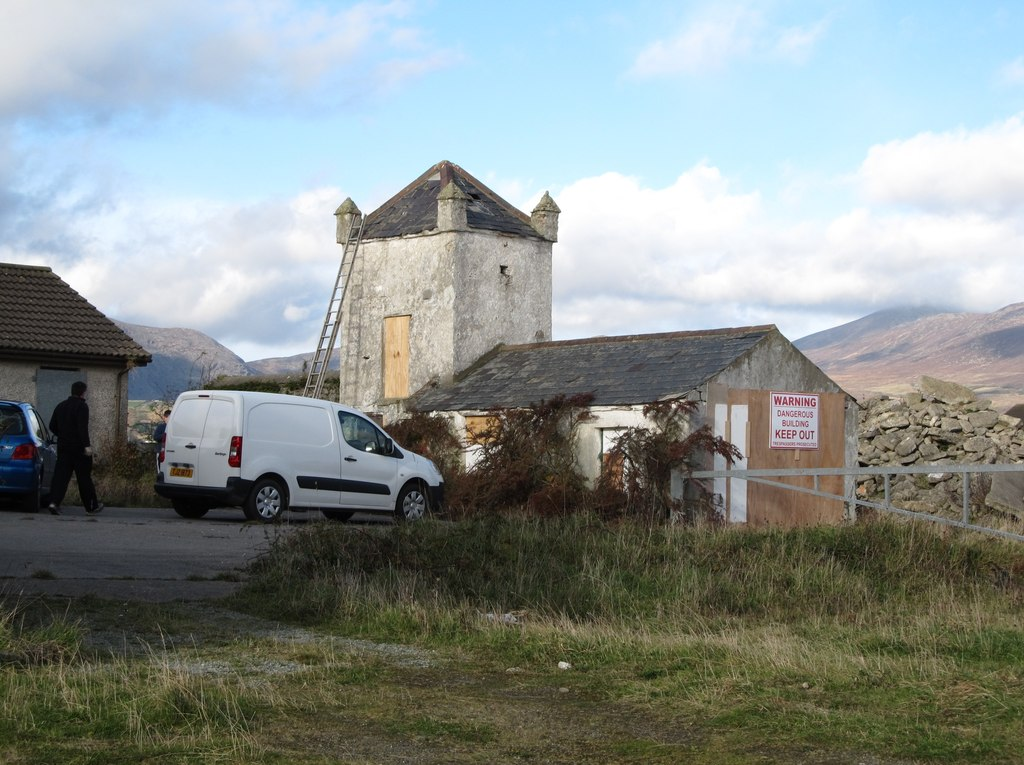
Annalong Coastguard Tower (2012)

In recent years, the building has deteriorated due to the loss of roof slates and exposure to the elements. Overgrown vegetation now encroaches on the external walls, and concerns have been raised about the condition of the roof structure.

=== Other places of interest ===
Annalong Mural Project is a mural painted by pupils from Annalong Primary School and St. Mary's Glasdrumman depicting the area of the Mournes on Main Street. It was created in a cross-community effort between the two schools.

== Music ==
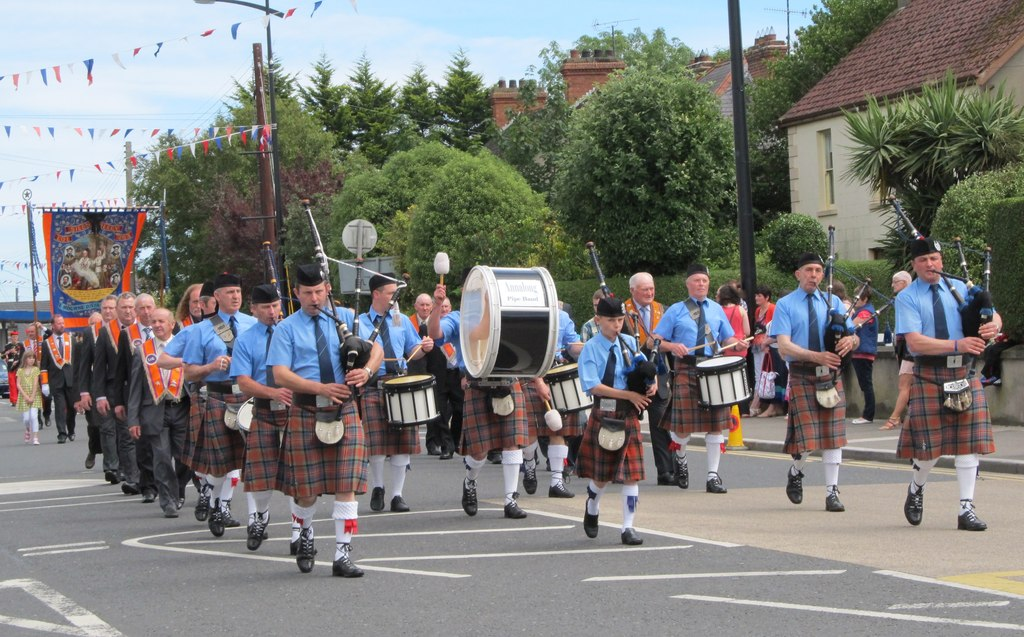
Annalong Pipe Band

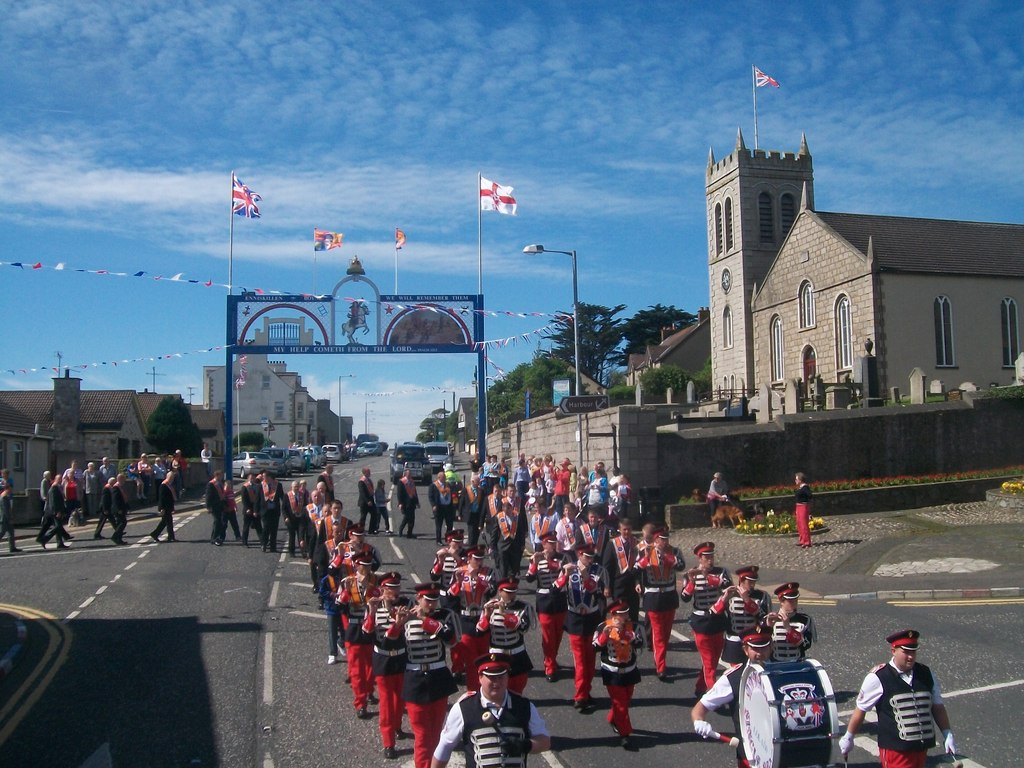
Annalong Single Star Flute Band

Annalong is home to multiple marching bands:

- Brunswick Accordion Band
- Annalong Pipe Band
- Annalong Single Star Flute Band

== Education ==
Annalong has one school in the village, Annalong Primary School, which also includes a nursery unit. It was built in 1958 and replaced church schools in the village. The Annalong Primary School Nursery Unit was opened in September 2000.

== Demography ==
=== 2011 census ===
On census day in 2011, 27 March 2011, there were 1,805 people living in Annalong. Of those:

- 20.8% were aged under 16 years and 15.8% were aged 5 and over;
- The average age was 38 years (Northern Ireland average 37.6);
- 50.1% of the population were male and 49.9% were female;
- 29.8% were from a Catholic background, and 64% were from a Protestant background;
- 5.2% of people aged 16–74 were unemployed;
- 21.4% of the population had no access to a car or van.

=== 2001 census ===
As of the 2001 census, Annalong was classified by the Northern Ireland Statistics and Research Agency (NISRA) as a village (i.e. it has a population between 1,000 and 2,250 people). On census day in 2001, 29 April 2001, there were 1,778 people living in Annalong. Of these:

- 23.8% were aged under 16 and 19.1% were aged 60 and over;
- the average age was 36.2 years (Northern Ireland average age 35.8 years);
- 50.1% of the population were male and 49.9% were female;
- 25.9% were from a Catholic background, and 71.8% were from a Protestant background;
- 3.1% of people aged 16–74 were unemployed.
- 7.5% of the local population had access to a car or van.

== Religion ==
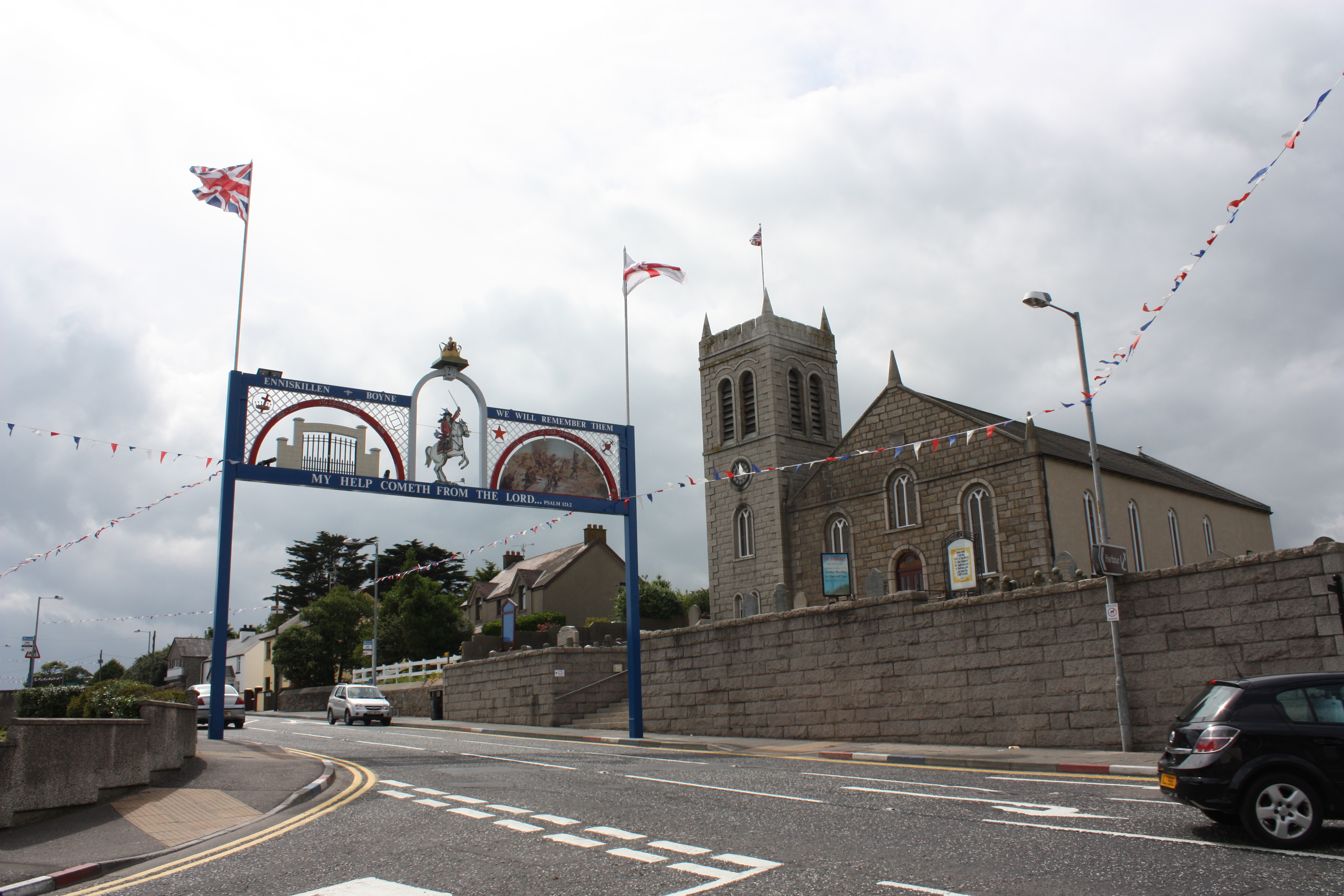
Annalong Presbyterian Church and Orange Arch, July 2010

In the 2011 census, 64% of residents declared that they were from a Protestant background, while 29.8% stated they were from a Catholic background. There are several churches in Annalong, including;

- Annalong Presbyterian Church
- Kilhorne Parish Church (part of the Diocese of Down and Dromore)
- Annalong Christian Fellowship
- Annalong Gospel Hall
- Annalong Free Presbyterian Church

== Sport ==
Annalong is represented by two football clubs. These were formerly based on Protestant and Catholic origin; however, both teams are now more religiously mixed due to decreasing religious tensions in Northern Ireland. Annalong Football Club has two junior football teams (65 registered senior players) who participate in the Mid Ulster Football League. There are training sessions two nights per week. The Mourne Rovers football team are also based in Annalong; many of their players also play for local Gaelic teams.

Annalong Canoe and Kayak Club (ACKC), trains Kilkeel Leisure Centre each Tuesday night. This club also has an annual camping trip to mainland Europe.

Annalong Outdoor Bowling Club is the village's bowling club.

== Notable people ==
- Francis Rawdon Chesney (1789–1872), Army general; Chesney was born in Annalong. At age 25, he was honoured for saving the lives of several local fishermen who were caught in a storm. He was a British soldier, an explorer in Asia, and was able to demonstrate that the Suez Canal was a feasible project, bringing about its eventual construction.
- Elizabeth Shane (1877–1951), a poet, lived her last years at Glassdrummond House near Annalong.

== See also ==
- List of villages in Northern Ireland
- List of towns in Northern Ireland
