= WWPN (FM) =

Coordinates: 39.3829°N 79.0784°W

- Westernport, Maryland; United States
- Broadcast area: Central Maryland; Potomac Highlands of West Virginia
- Frequency: 101.1 MHz
- Branding: Spirit 101

Programming
- Format: Contemporary Christian

Ownership
- Owner: Studio C LLC

History
- First air date: 1988
- Former call signs: WEFS (1988)

Technical information
- Licensing authority: FCC
- Facility ID: 19717
- Class: A
- ERP: 320 watts
- HAAT: 417 meters (1,368 ft)

Links
- Public license information: Public file; LMS
- Website: spirit101fm.com

WWPN (101.1 FM, "Spirit 101") is a Contemporary Christian formatted radio station licensed to Westernport, Maryland, serving Western Maryland and the Potomac Highlands of West Virginia. WWPN is owned by Studio C LLC.

== History ==
In November 2009, WWPN added a translator, W300BU, to the Keyser, West Virginia area.

== Translator ==
Call sign	Frequency	City of license	FID	ERP (W)	Class	FCC info
W300BU	107.9 FM	Keyser, West Virginia	147836	50	D	LMS
