= WTGA-FM =

- Thomaston, Georgia; United States
- Frequency: 101.1 MHz
- RDS: PI: 8770; PS: FUN101.1; RT: "Title" - Artist
- Branding: Fun 101.1 FM

Programming
- Format: Classic hits

Ownership
- Owner: Radio Georgia, Inc.

History
- First air date: November 15, 1982
- Former call signs: WTZQ (1982–1983)

Technical information
- Licensing authority: FCC
- Facility ID: 54590
- Class: A
- ERP: 1,250 watts
- HAAT: 218 meters
- Transmitter coordinates: 32°51′49.00″N 84°25′10.00″W

Links
- Public license information: Public file; LMS
- Webcast: Listen Live
- Website: fun101fm.com

WTGA-FM (101.1 FM) is a radio station broadcasting a classic hits format. Licensed to Thomaston, Georgia, United States. The station is currently owned by Radio Georgia, Inc.

== History ==
The station went on the air as WTZQ on 1982-08-09. on 1983-05-09, the station changed its call sign to the current WTGA .
