= KDBN =

- Parachute, Colorado; United States
- Frequency: 101.1 MHz
- Branding: KSUN Community Radio

Programming
- Format: Variety

Ownership
- Owner: KSUN Community Radio Corporation

History
- First air date: 2008
- Last air date: January 2026
- Former call signs: KENG (2008–2009)
- Call sign meaning: "Doing Business Naturally" (Note: Backronym; the call sign was transferred from KLIF-FM in Haltom City, Texas, which was formerly branded "The Bone".)

Technical information
- Licensing authority: FCC
- Facility ID: 162254
- Class: A
- ERP: 425 watts
- HAAT: −426 meters (−1,398 ft)
- Transmitter coordinates: 39°26′31″N 108°1′15″W

Links
- Public license information: Public file; LMS
- Webcast: Listen live
- Website: www.ksunradio.org

KDBN (101.1 FM, "KSUN") was a low-powered radio station licensed to serve the community of Parachute, Colorado. The station was owned by KSUN Community Radio Corporation. KSUN was a community radio station that broadcast programming selected from its members and community input. KSUN was volunteer run and listener supported.

KDBN was the successor to two earlier stations: KSBP-LP, a low-power FM station operated by KSUN Community Radio from 2002 to 2013, and KENG, a commercial rock station launched by Cumulus Media in 2008. KENG was renamed KDBN in 2009, swapped to Townsquare Media in 2012, and sold to KSUN Community Radio–replacing KSBP-LP–in 2013. KDBN closed down in 2026.

== History ==
The first station to use 101.1 FM in Parachute, Colorado, was KSBP-LP, a low-power FM station that KSUN Community Radio put on the air December 11, 2002. Its programming included community radio shows and Grand Valley High School football and basketball. KSBP-LP moved to 103.9 FM in 2007, in part to accommodate a new full-power facility, KENG, that was licensed in 2008 and put on the air by Cumulus Media. KENG's call sign was changed to KDBN on September 7, 2009; the call sign was moved from KLIF-FM in Haltom City, Texas.

Cumulus Media's Grand Junction cluster–which KDBN was grouped with–was swapped, along with its clusters in Augusta, Bangor, and Presque Isle, Maine; Binghamton, New York; Bismarck, North Dakota; Killeen–Temple and Odessa–Midland; New Bedford, Massachusetts; Sioux Falls, South Dakota; and Tuscaloosa, Alabama, to Townsquare Media in 2012 in exchange for Townsquare's stations in Bloomington and Peoria, Illinois, and $116 million. At the time of the swap, KDBN programmed a rock format as "Energy 101.1".

Within a year of the swap, Townsquare was on the verge of closing KDBN, leading KSUN Community Radio to offer to take over the facility. The $1,500 purchase required the divestment of the KSBP-LP license; that station went off the air on June 27, 2013, ahead of the July 1 transfer of the KDBN license. (Note: On February 1, 2016, KSUN Community Radio surrendered the KSBP-LP license to the Federal Communications Commission (FCC). The FCC cancelled the license and deleted KSBP-LP's call sign from its database on February 5.) After a silent period to solve regulatory and paperwork issues, KDBN went back on the air on July 29, delayed from a planned July 15 relaunch. The relaunched station initially retained KDBN's prior "Energy 101.1" branding and devoted much of its schedule to classic rock, but also carried over much of KSBP-LP's previous programming, including blocks devoted to classical music, religious programming, and public affairs. While it remained a non-profit listener-supported operation, KSUN Community Radio opted to retain KDBN's commercial license, allowing the station to sell advertising rather than the underwriting announcements heard on KSBP-LP.

The KDBN license was surrendered by KSUN Community Radio in January 2026.
