= WIAM-LP =

- Knoxville, Tennessee; United States
- Frequency: 101.1 MHz
- Branding: The Way

Programming
- Format: Religious

Ownership
- Owner: Calvary Chapel of Knoxville

Technical information
- Licensing authority: FCC
- Facility ID: 135475
- Class: L1
- ERP: 23 watts
- HAAT: 60.6 meters (199 ft)
- Transmitter coordinates: 36°0′24.00″N 83°54′21.00″W

Links
- Public license information: LMS
- Webcast: Listen live
- Website: https://thewaymedia.net/wiam-radio

WIAM-LP (101.1 FM, "The Way") is a radio station broadcasting a religious format. Licensed to serve Knoxville, Tennessee, United States, the station is owned by Calvary Chapel of Knoxville.
