= WVWP-LP =

- Wayne, West Virginia; United States
- Broadcast area: Metro Wayne
- Frequency: 101.1 MHz
- Branding: Super Station 101.1

Programming
- Format: Classic rock Blues
- Affiliations: Fox News Radio

Ownership
- Owner: Wayne High School

History
- First air date: July 13, 2015
- Call sign meaning: West Virginia, Wayne Pioneers

Technical information
- Licensing authority: FCC
- Facility ID: 194670
- Class: L1
- ERP: 3 watts
- HAAT: 174.5 meters (573 ft)
- Transmitter coordinates: 38°13′31.60″N 82°27′5.60″W

Links
- Public license information: LMS
- Webcast: Listen live
- Website: www.superstationwv.com

WVWP-LP is a Classic rock and Blues formatted broadcast radio station licensed to and serving Wayne, West Virginia. WVWP-LP is owned and operated by Wayne High School.
