= Greencastle, County Down =

Castle in County Down, Northern Ireland

Coordinates: 54.04053°N 6.1043°W

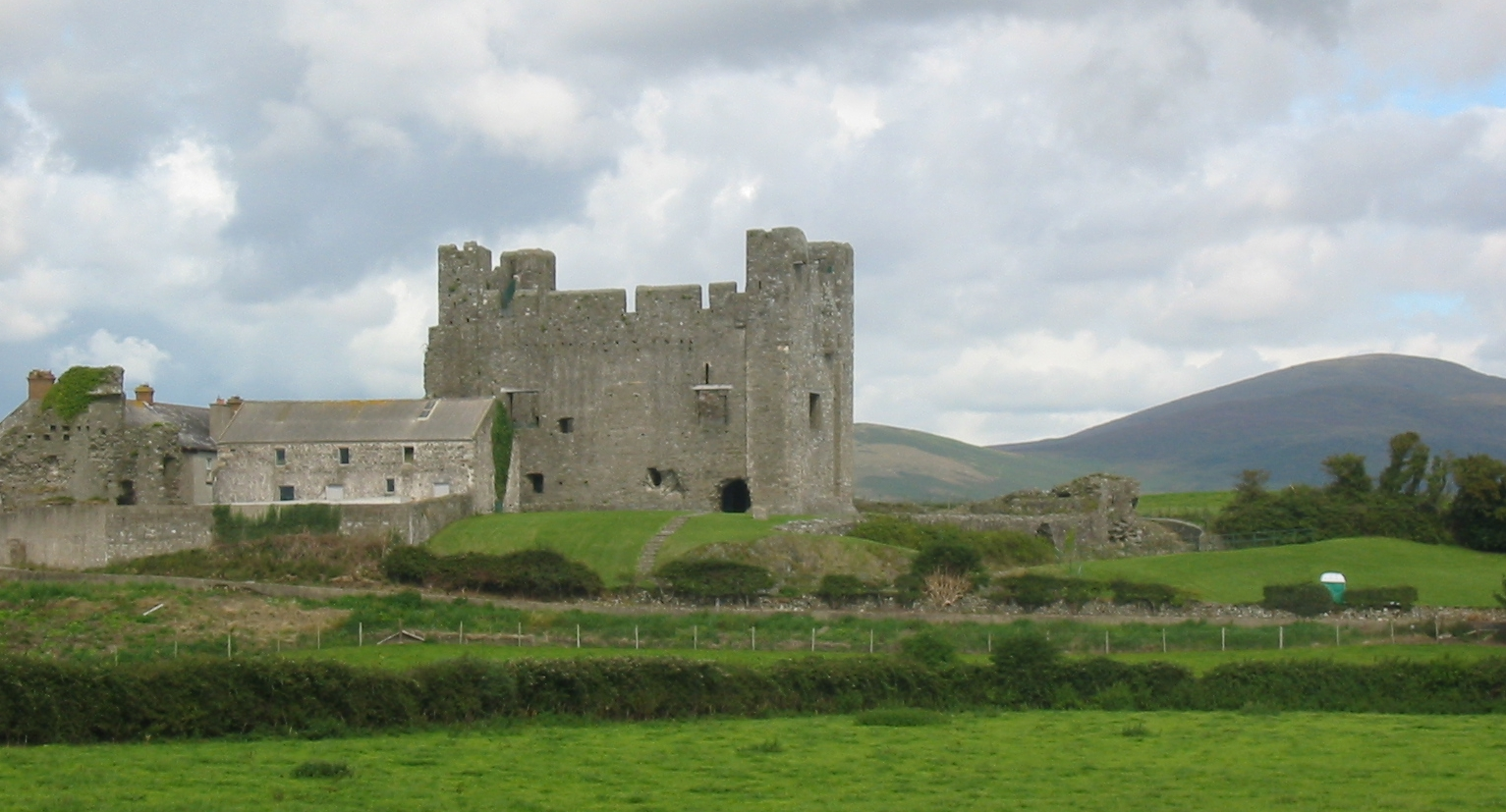
Greencastle

Greencastle is a castle in County Down, Northern Ireland. While it dates mainly from the 13th century, it had substantial 15th- and 16th-century alterations. It was originally surrounded by outer rectangular walls with four corner towers (ruins of some remain). It is likely to have been built by Hugh de Lacy, along with Carlingford Castle on the opposite side of Carlingford Lough, to guard the narrow entry channel to the Lough, and the ferry crossing between the two.

The motte from the earlier wooden motte-and-bailey castle (possibly built by John de Courcy) is still on the seaward side nearer the point. According to one legend John de Courcy was married at Greencastle, but this may have been at the original motte & bailey castle. According to the information boards at the site it was held for the English Crown by Richard de Burgh, Earl of Ulster, from 1264 to 1333. It was attacked and taken by Edward Bruce, the brother of Robert, in 1316. This was in spite of one of Richard de Burgh's daughters having married Robert the Bruce himself. It was attacked at least twice by the Irish in the later 14th century but still maintained as an English garrison in the 1590s. In the 16th century it was held by the Earl of Kildare and then Nicholas Bagenal of Newry. It fell into disuse after a bombardment by Cromwellian soldiers, to stop it being used by rebel forces.

The site is also surrounded in close proximity by other medieval sites/monuments: e.g., the motte fortification predating the stone castle (Northern Ireland Sites and Monuments Record No. DOW 057:001), late-Medieval stone church (DOW 057:002) and two burial pits (DOW 057:017) that were excavated in 2003; one contained a female aged 25–35 and the second a child (one presumes related) of less than four years old at death (1 and a half to 3 and a half years old). A calibrated date range of AD1270-1380 was indicated; likely contemporary with the construction of Greencastle in the mid-13th century.

The castle underwent archaeological excavations from 1966 - 1970 which also identified layers of occupation deposits that pre-dated the castle on the site.

The castle is a state-care historic monument in the townland of Greencastle, in the Newry and Mourne District Council area, at grid ref: J2473 1184.

== Links ==
- Greencastle, cloghmore.bravepages.com
- Greencastle, carlingfordandmourne.com
- https://discovernorthernireland.com/things-to-do/greencastle-royal-castle-p675311

== Images ==
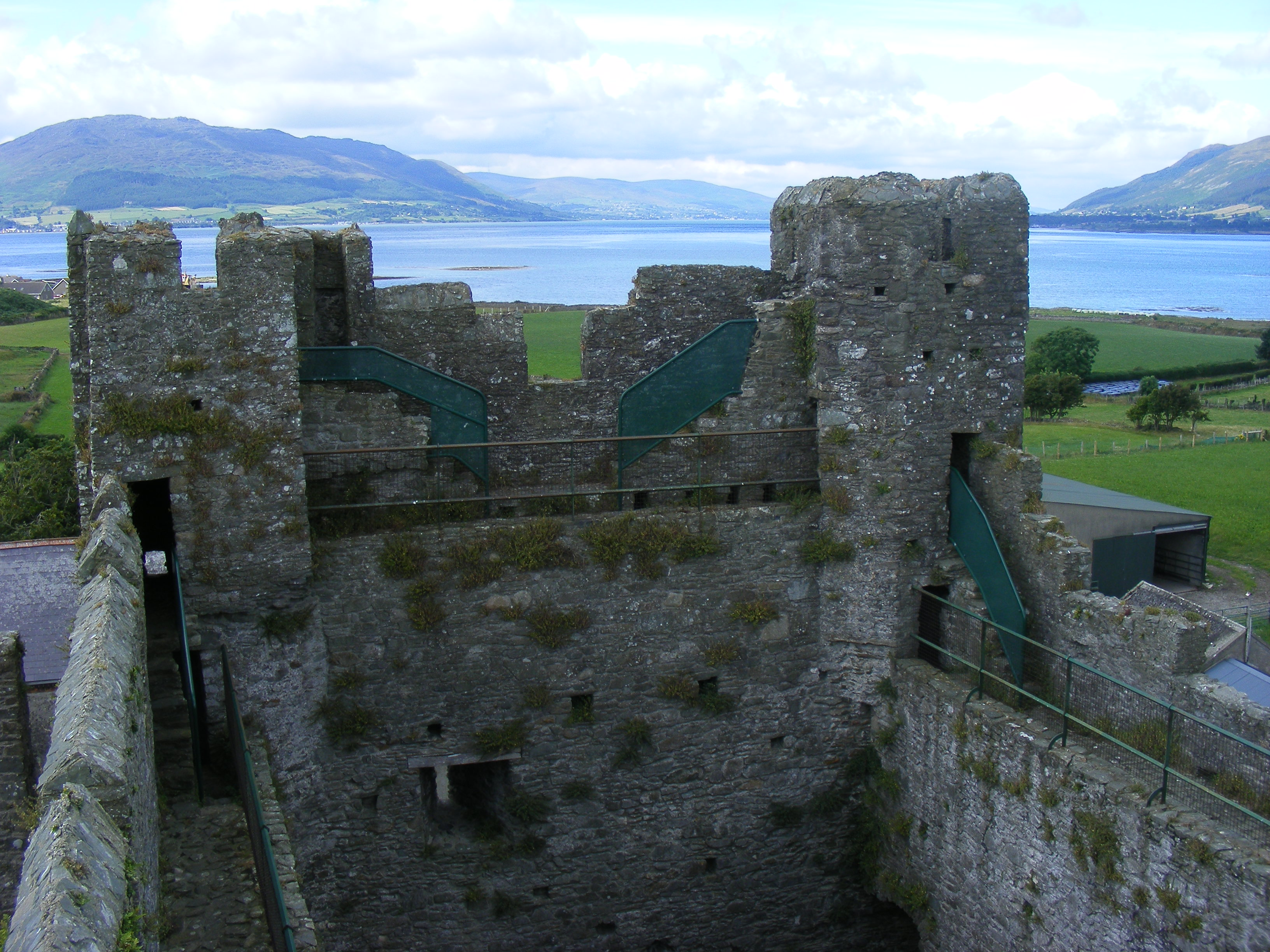
Looking North West over Carlingford Lough

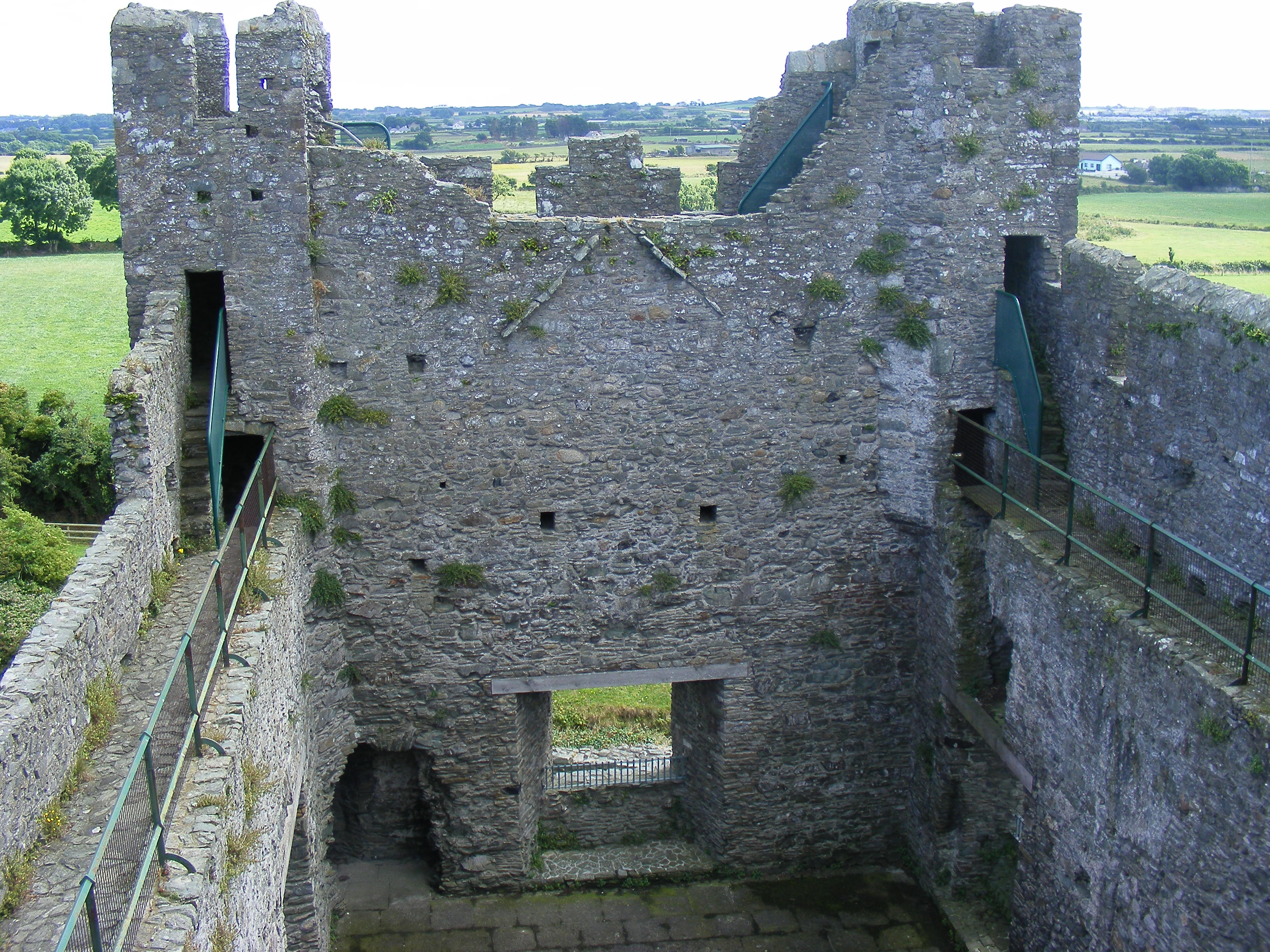
Looking South East

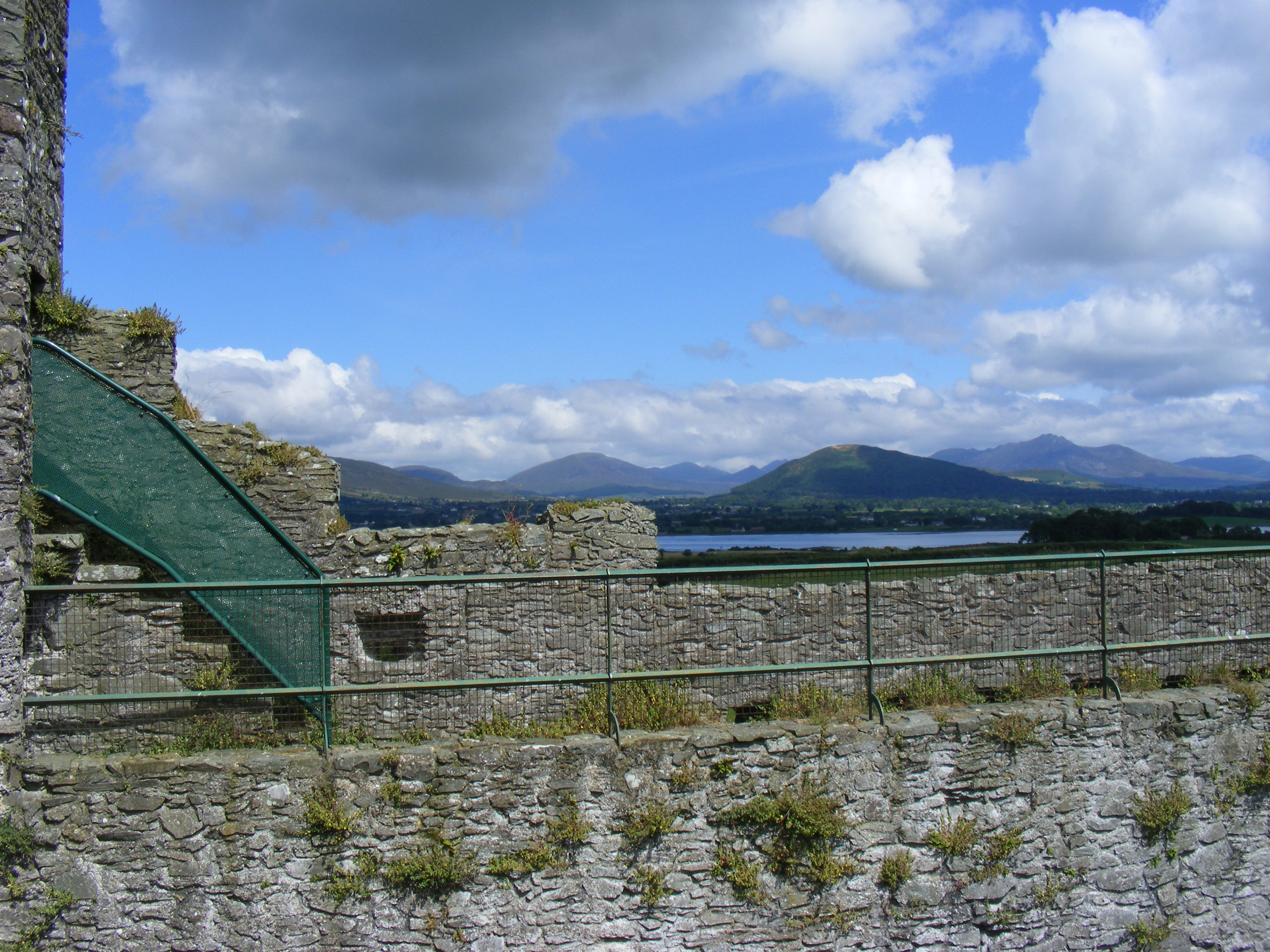
Looking North to the Mournes

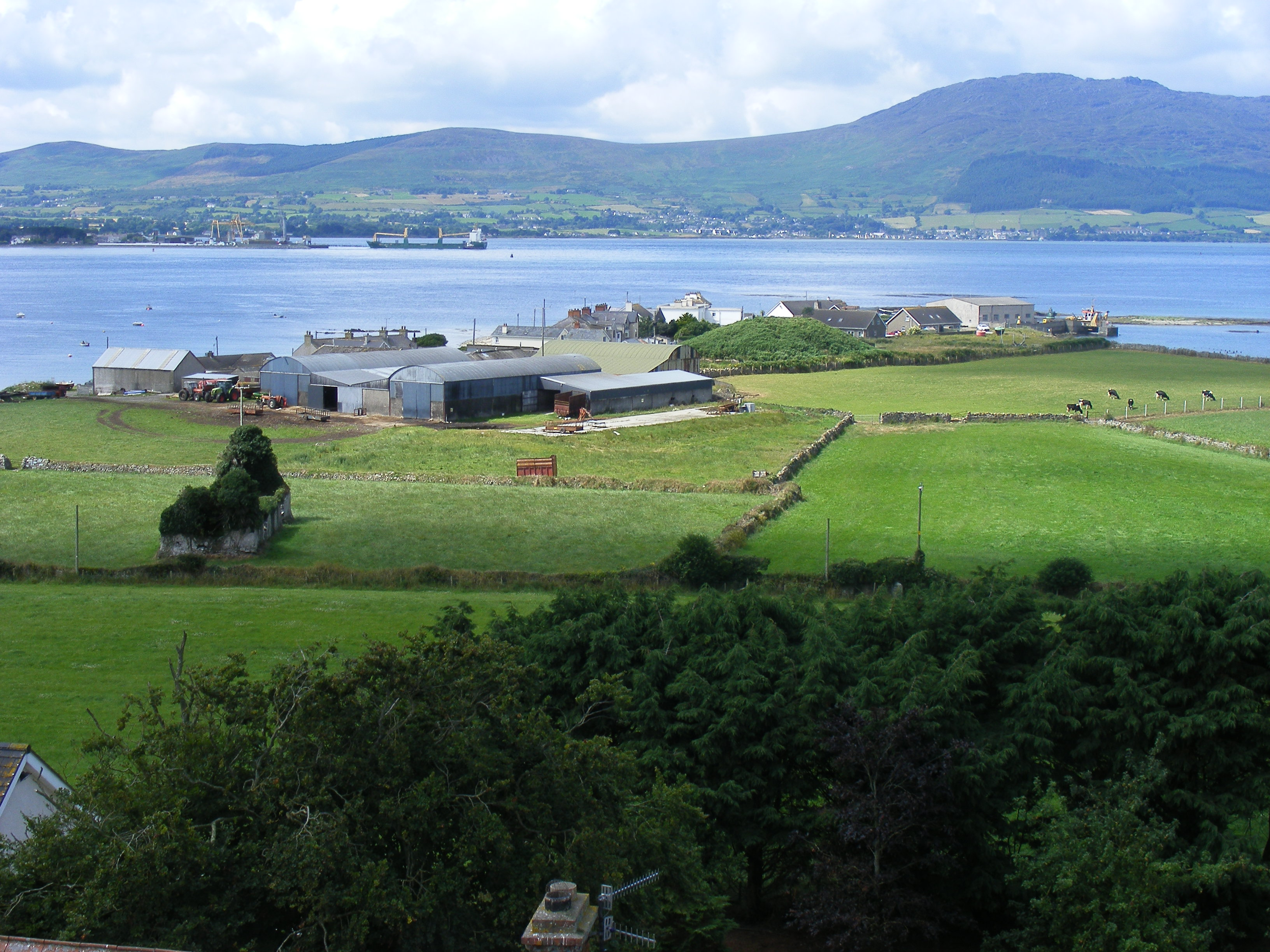
Looking West towards Greencastle Point
