= Mourne (barony) =

Coordinates: 54.10865°N 6.00211°W

Mourne Múrna(Irish)
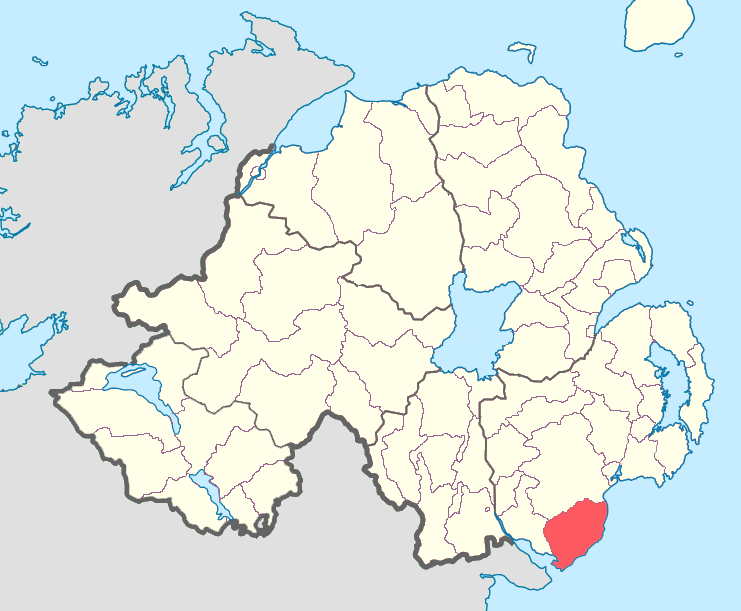
- Location of Mourne, County Down, Northern Ireland.
- Sovereign state: United Kingdom
- Country: Northern Ireland
- County: Down

Mourne (named after the Múrna) is a barony in County Down, Northern Ireland. It lies in the south-east of the county, with the Irish Sea to its east. It is bordered by two other baronies: Iveagh Upper, Lower Half and Iveagh Upper, Upper Half to the north and west. Called at one time Bairrche its present name of Mourne comes from the Múrna (Old Irish: Mughdorna), a people who hail from a territory of the same name in modern County Monaghan.

== Ancient history ==
=== The Mugdorna ===
According to local historian Peadar Livingstone, the Mugdorna are described as being a powerful people in the "archaic" period and may have been rulers of Ulster before the ascendancy of the Ulaid. He also suggests that some of their constituent tribes are either pre-Celtic or very early Celtic people.

Early genealogists would claim that they descend from Mughdhorn Dubh, a son of Colla Menn, however this has been rebuked as a politically-driven construct. Indeed, Mugdorna is listed as being one of the territories conquered from the Ulaid by the Three Collas with Colla Menn taking possession of Mughdorna. The O'Hanratties are stated as having anciently possessed this territory. Francis John Byrne points out that the name Mugdorna, 'the slave folk', denotes their low-caste non-Gael origins and that they are the one people of the Airgíalla for whom no specific ethnic background is supplied.

=== Bairrche ===
Bairrche is the ancient name of the Mourne territory and originally the Mourne Mountains had also been named Beanne-Boirche ("Boirche's peaks"). According to the Dinnsenchus they were named after a shepherd called Boirche who herded on the mountains the cattle of Ross, son of Imchadh, a king of Ulaid in the third century. The Dinnsenchus states that his favourite look-out point was the highest peak in the mountain range, hence why the mountains received the name. Alternatively they are named after Bécc Bairrche mac Blathmaic, a king of the Ulaid during the 7th and 8th centuries.

According to the Annals of Ulster around 1165 the Uí Echach asked Muircertach Ua Lochlainn, High-King of Ireland, that the kingship of Ulaid be given to Eochaidh Mac Duinn Sleibhe. In return they gave pledges for everyone in Ulaid to Ua Lochlainn as well as many of their treasures. Mac Duinnsleibhe also gave the territory of Bairrche to Ua Lochlainn, who then gave it to Donnchadh Ó Cearbhaill (English: O'Carroll) of Louth, lord of Airgíalla.

=== Migration of the Mugdorna to Bairrche ===
By the 11th and 12th centuries the Mugdorna had become subordinate to the Ui Chremthainn, ruled by the powerful Ó Cearbhaill (English: O'Carroll). The last king of Mugdorna, Maolruanaigh Ó Machainen (O'Machoiden), is recorded in the Annals of Ulster as being slain in 1110.

In the latter half of the 12th century, a group of the Mugdorna emigrated from Cremorne (from Irish: Crioch Mughdurna) to what is now south County Down where they settled in Bairrche to form a new kingdom. It is suggested that Donnchadh Ó Cearbhaill, being King of Airgialla which included the original territory of the Mugdorna, and having just received the territory of Bairrche may have transplanted them to the area to reinforce his control over it. They would rename Bairrche and its mountains after them, hence the present-day names of Mourne and the Mourne Mountains.

O'Dugan lists O'Machoiden as being rulers in the 12th century of Mourne in County Down.

=== Annals of Ulster ===
The Annals of Ulster state for Bairrche:

- 601.1 - An earthquake in Bairrche.
- 611.1 - The army of the Ulaid was struck by terrible thunder in Bairrche.
- 674.1 - The killing of Congal Cennfhatar son of Dúnchad, king of Ulaid. Béc of Bairrche killed him.
- 679.3 - The battle of Fínnechta against Béc of Bairrche.
- 707.6 - The pilgrim's staff assumed by Béc of Bairrche.
- 712.7 - The Ulaid were overthrown and Dubthach son of Béc of Bairrche fell therein.
- 714.7 - A battle between two sons of Béc of Bairrche and Bresal's son, king of Uí Echach, and the victors therein were Béc's sons.
- 718.2 - Béc of Bairrche dies.
- 730.6 - Oitechde son of Baithectde, Blamac's son, and Aengus son of Béc of Bairrche, rested.
- 753.13 - A whale was cast ashore in Bairrche in the time of Fiachna son of Aed Rón, king of Ulaid. It had three gold teeth in its head, each containing fifty ounces, and one of them was placed on the altar of Bennchor this year, that is, in AD 752.
- 1109.9 - A slaughter was inflicted on the Uí Méith, including their king, i.e. Goll Bairrche, and some of the men of Fernmag fell by the Uí Bresail and the Uí Echach.
- 1165.10 - ...and he [Eochaidh Mac Dúinn Sléibe] gave Bairrche to Ua Lochlainn [and] Ua Lochlainn gave it to Ua Cerbaill...

== Settlements ==
Below is a list of settlements in Mourne:

=== Towns ===
- Kilkeel
- Newcastle

=== Villages ===
- Annalong
- Atticall
- Dunnaval
- Ballymartin
- Dromara

== Civil parishes ==
Below is a list of civil parishes in Mourne:

- Kilkeel
