= Kilkeel =

Town in County Down, Northern Ireland

Coordinates: 54.059°N 5.992°W

Kilkeel: Irish: Cill Chaoil
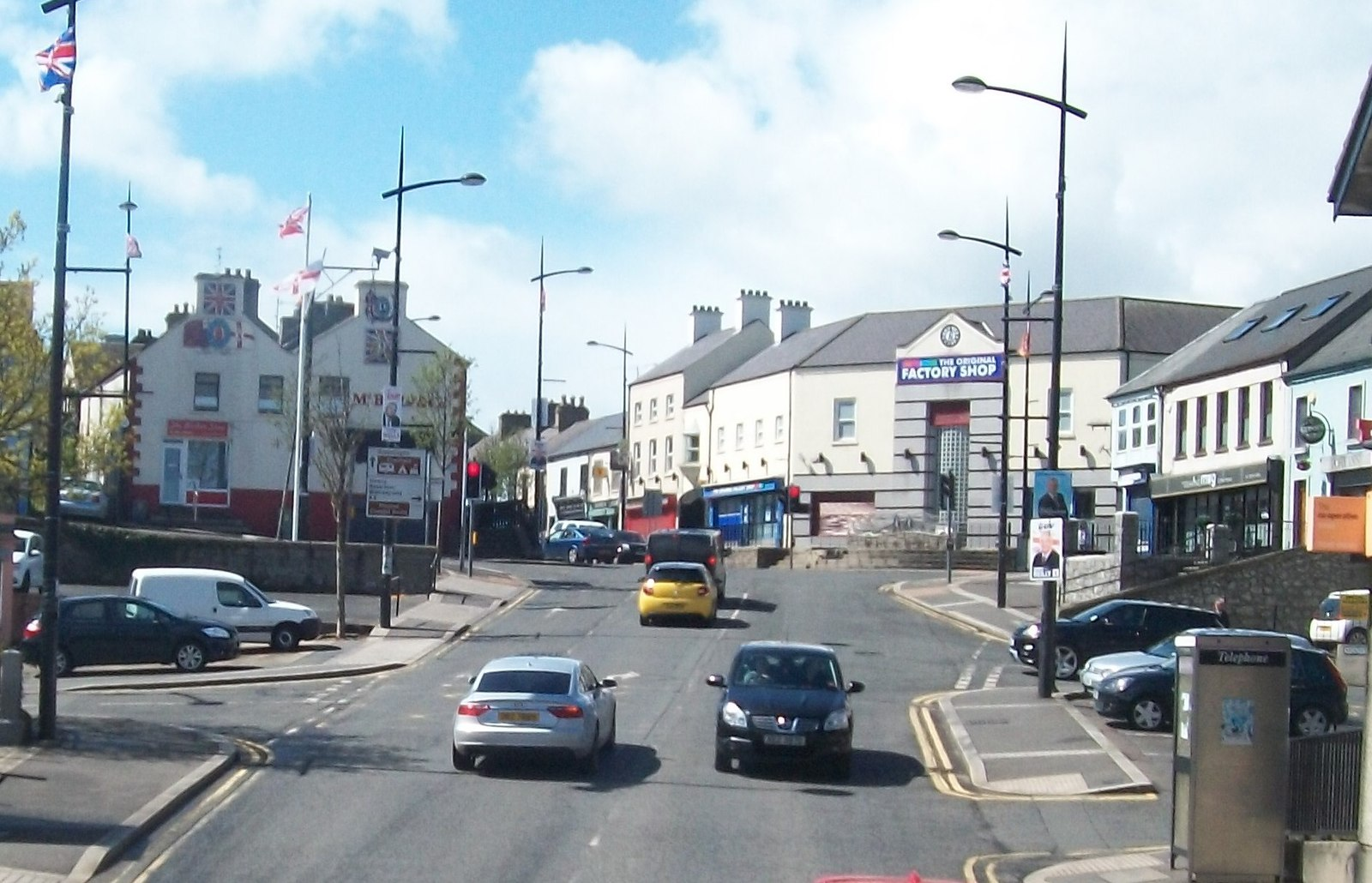
- The Square, Kilkeel

- Location within County Down
- Population: 6,633 (2021 census)
- District: Newry, Mourne and Down
- County: County Down
- Country: Northern Ireland
- Sovereign state: United Kingdom
- Post town: NEWRY
- Postcode district: BT34
- Dialling code: 028
- Police: Northern Ireland
- Fire: Northern Ireland
- Ambulance: Northern Ireland
- UK Parliament: South Down
- NI Assembly: South Down

Kilkeel (from Irish Cill Chaoil, meaning 'church of the narrow') is a small town and civil parish on the Irish Sea coast of County Down, Northern Ireland. It is the main fishing port on the Down coast, and its harbour is home to the largest fishing fleet in Northern Ireland. It had a population of 6,633 people at the 2021 census. The town contains the ruins of a 14th-century church and fort, winding streets and terraced shops. It lies just south of the Mourne Mountains, in the historic barony of Mourne, and is the southernmost town in Northern Ireland.

== Geography ==
Kilkeel town sits on a plain south of the Mourne Mountains, where the Kilkeel River flows south into the Irish Sea. It is in the barony of Mourne and the parish of Kilkeel. The town includes the townlands of:

- Aughnahoory (from Irish Áth na hÚraí 'ford on the river Uragh' – the old name of the Kilkeel River)
- Derryoge (from Doire Ríóg, 'Ríog's oak wood')
- Drumcro (from Druim Cró, 'ridge of the fold', or Druim Cruadh, 'hard ridge')
- Dunnaman
- Kilkeel (from Cill Chaoil, 'church of the narrow')
- Magheramurphy (from Machaire Mhurchaidh, 'Murphy's plain')
- Maghereagh (from Machaire Riabhach, 'grey or speckled plain')

Altogether there are 69 townlands in the civil parish and barony.

== History ==
The medieval Old Church of St Colman

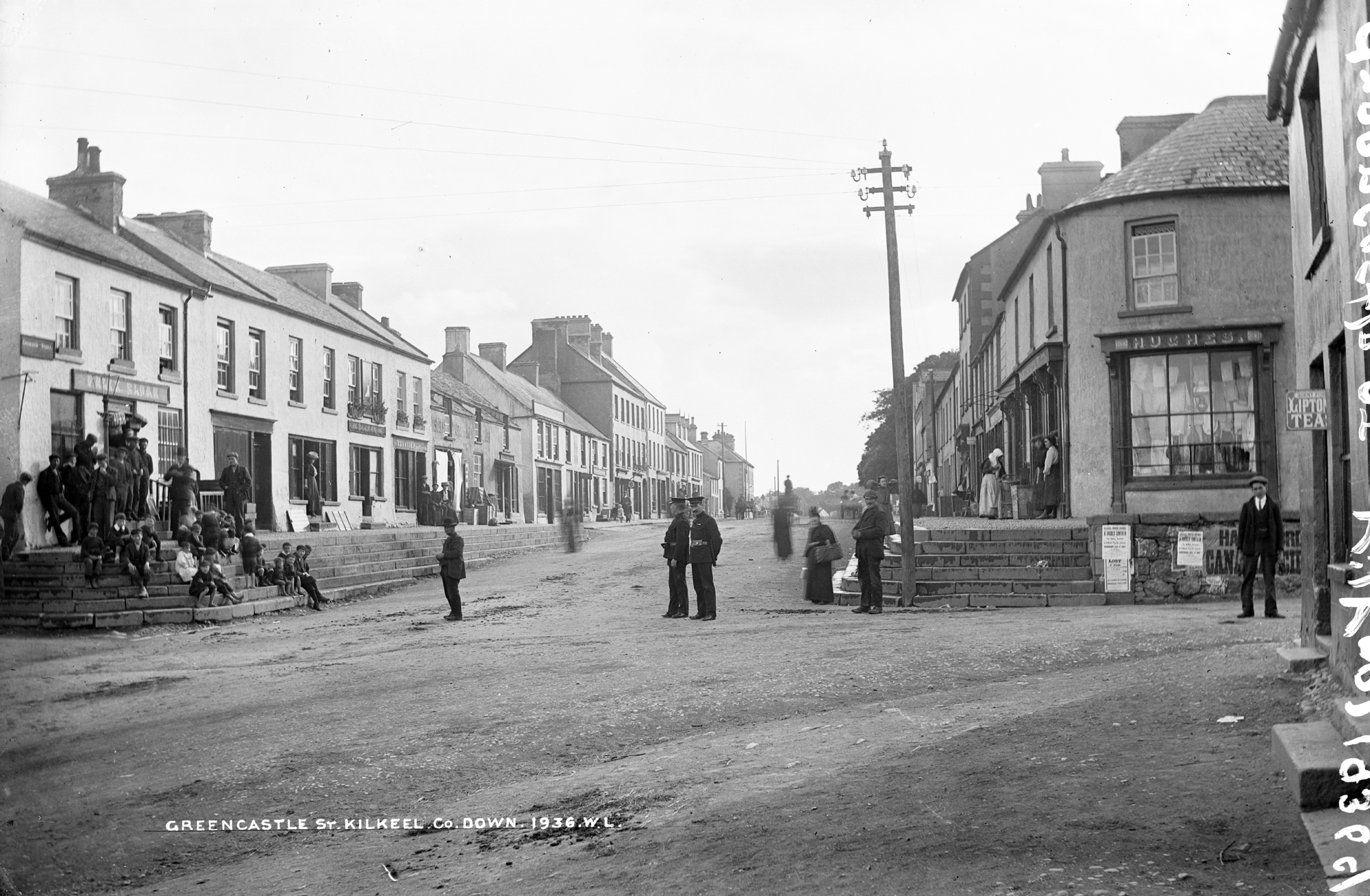
Kilkeel c.1907

Kilkeel takes its name from the old church overlooking the town, it being the anglicised version of the Irish Cill Chaoil meaning "church of the narrow". The name may refer to the church itself or perhaps the church's location on a narrow site between the Aughrim and Kilkeel rivers. The church was built in 1388 and dedicated to Saint Colman of Mourne. It was thought to be the principal church in a group which included Kilmegan and Kilcoo despite the fact that Kilkeel was very sparsely populated in the Middle Ages. There are references to Kilkeel as a Christian settlement as far back as the 11th century. The church was rebuilt in the 1600s, and was later used as a school in the 19th century, before being abandoned.

The cemetery attached to the church was used for burials until 1916. The last burials at the cemetery were victims of a collision between two steamers, the Retriever and the SS Connemara, in Carlingford Lough.

The town is split by the Aughrim river. The northern part falls into the Kilkeel townland, while the southern part falls into Magheramurphy.

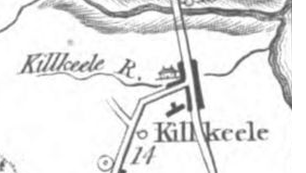
1777 map of Kilkeel

Kilkeel grew slowly from a small village to a town by the late 1700s. The earliest recorded dates are a kerbstone inscribed 1772, and a second story arch window in Newry St inscribed 1790, while the map alongside from 1777 shows that Kilkeel's current layout of 5 main streets was already established.

The population of Kilkeel peaked at about 15,000 at the time of the great famine, after which it fell to about 11,000, with about 1,000 people in Kilkeel town.

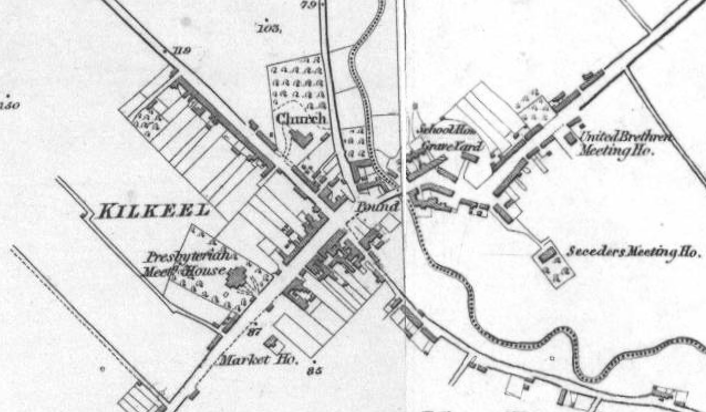
1834 map of Kilkeel

== Economy ==
Fishing is a major industry in Kilkeel, with Kilkeel Harbour the home port for the largest fishing fleet in Northern Ireland. There are fish-processing factories around the port, pleasure angling off the piers and lobster farming along the coastline.

As of the early 21st century, Collins Aerospace (previously known as BE Aerospace and Rockwell Collins) had become the largest employer in the area. As of 2014, its Kilkeel facility, which manufactures aircraft seats for a worldwide customer base, employed over 800 people.

== Music ==
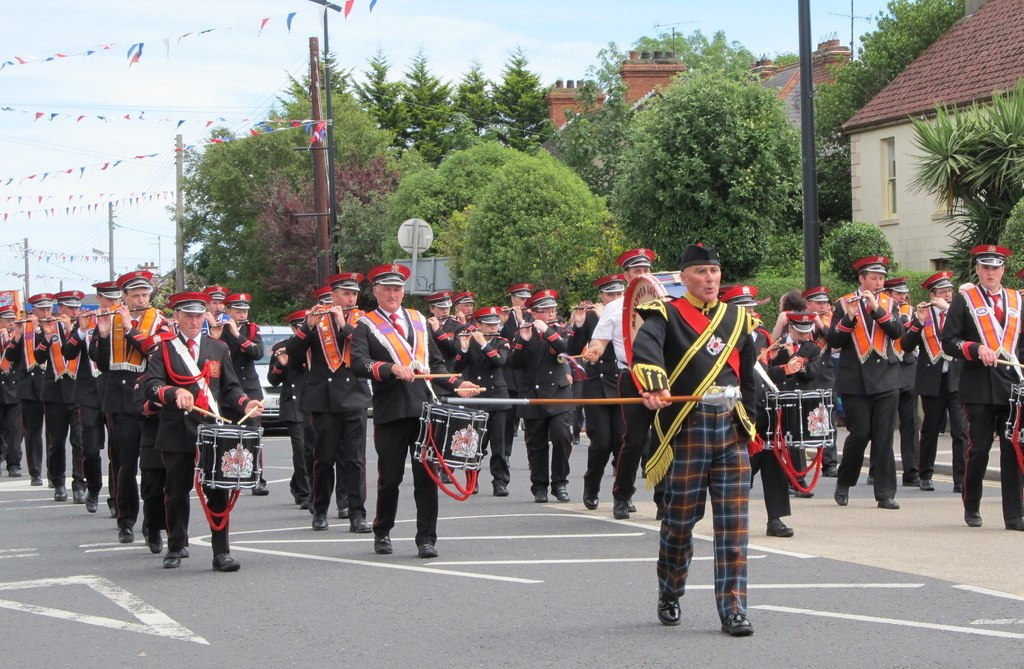
Ballyvea Flute Band

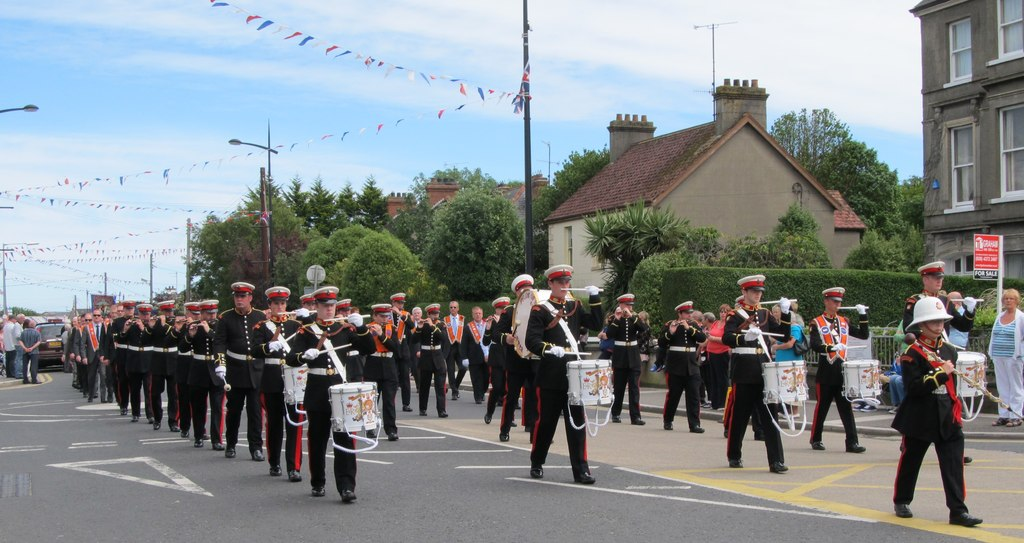
Pride of Ballinran Flute Band

The Kilkeel area is home to fourteen marching bands:

- Pride of Ballinran Flute Band
- Mourne Young Defenders Flute Band
- Rising Sons of the Valley Flute Band
- Ballyvea Flute Band
- Derryogue Flute Band
- Orangefield Flute Band
- Glenloughan Flute Band
- Kilkeel Silver Band
- Aughnahoory Pipe Band
- Ballymartin Pipe Band
- Cranfield Accordion Band
- Ballymageough Accordion Band
- Roden Accordion Band
- Mourne Memorial Flute Band
- Kilkeel Young Conquerers (Founded in 2025 by the young men in the junior orange lodge L.O.L. 1943)

== People ==
The town is also known as the location where the 19th-century serial killer William Hare died.

Prince Harry, Duke of Sussex, grandson of the late Queen Elizabeth II and son of King Charles III of the United Kingdom was granted the title Baron Kilkeel along with that of Duke of Sussex and Earl of Dumbarton.

== Demography ==
=== 2011 census ===
On census day 2011, 27 March 2011, there were 6,541 people living in Kilkeel (2,557 households), accounting for 0.36% of the Northern Ireland total. Of these:

- 21.27% were aged under 16 years and 15.15% were aged 65 and over;
- 51.49% of the usually resident population were female and 48.51% were male;
- 54.00% belong to or were brought up as Protestants and 40.99% belong to or were brought up as Catholics;
- 54.67% indicated that they had a British national identity, 27.60% had a Northern Irish national identity and 20.29% had an Irish national identity (respondents could indicate more than one national identity);
- 35 years was the average (median) age of the population;
- 8.93% had some knowledge of Ulster-Scots and 8.82% had some knowledge of Irish.

In 2011, 44.31% of persons in the administrative area indicated that they had an Irish national identity, 30.39% had a Northern Irish national identity and 28.53% had a British national identity.

=== 2021 census ===
On census day in 2021, 21 March 2021, there were 6,633 people living in Kilkeel. Of these:

- 50.82% belong to or were brought up as Protestants and 40.60% belong to or were brought up as Catholics.
- 49.28% indicated that they had a British national identity, 32.22% had a Northern Irish national identity and 23.55% had an Irish national identity (respondents could indicate more than one national identity).

=== Religion ===
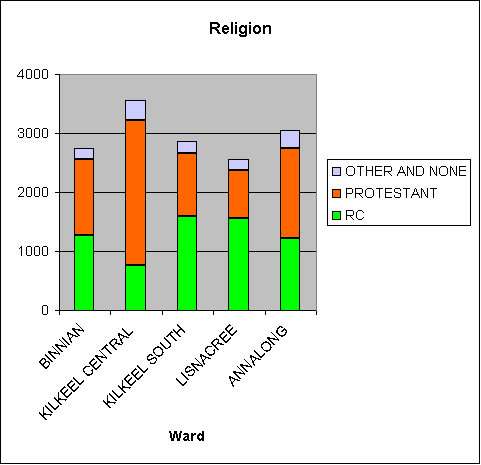
Religious breakdown of wards in and around Kilkeel -from 2001 census data

In 1659, 80% of inhabitants were Catholic, and by 1901, this had fallen to half. 60% of the remainder were Presbyterians and most of the rest were Church of Ireland.

== Education ==
- St Colman's Primary School
- Brackenagh West Primary School
- Grange Primary School
- Holy Cross Primary School
- Gaelscoil na mBeann is a bilingual primary school that uses the Irish language as its primary medium of instruction while English is introduced at Primary 3. The school teaches the Northern Ireland curriculum. It was established in 2010 by a group of local people and parents who wanted Gaelic-medium education for their children. The school gained recognition and funding from the Department of Education in 2012.
- Kilkeel High School
- Kilkeel Primary School
- St. Louis High School
- Mourne Grange Village School
- Mourne Independent Christian School
- St Colombans Primary School

== Sport ==
Sports played in the Kilkeel area include Gaelic football, football, hockey, fishing, golf, hurling, and swimming.

There are five Gaelic Athletic Association clubs in the area: An Ríocht, Longstone, Atticall, Ballymartin, and Glasdrumman, with associated bars, facilities and community activities. In 2023 the five clubs came together to form Clann Mhúrn (people of Mourne) Hurling club and rotate their training and playing around the five different facilities. The most senior association football team is Valley Rangers Football Club of the Mid-Ulster Football League. Other local teams include Ballyvea FC, Dunnaman FC and Mourne Rovers.

Kilkeel Elks Basketball Club was based at An Ríocht Hall, it is now defunct.

Kilkeel Hockey Club play at McAuley Park, and is the only hockey club in Mourne.

There is also a golf course at Kilkeel Golf Club and Cranfield formerly had a pitch and putt course. Fairways Golf, an indoor golf simulator, opened in 2023.

== Peerage title ==
Baron Kilkeel is a title in the peerage of the United Kingdom. It was created on 19 May 2018 by Queen Elizabeth II as a substantive title for her grandson Prince Harry on the occasion of his marriage to Meghan Markle. It is named after the town of Kilkeel. The full title and designation of the barony is "Baron Kilkeel, of Kilkeel in the County of Down".

== See also ==
- Kilkeel (civil parish)
- Tullaghmurray Lass
- List of towns and villages in Northern Ireland
- List of localities in Northern Ireland by population
- List of RNLI stations
