= Maghera (disambiguation) =

Maghera may refer to:

- Maghera, a town in County Londonderry, Northern Ireland
- Maghera, County Down, a civil parish in County Down, Northern Ireland
- Maghera (parish), a parish in County Londonderry, Northern Ireland
- Maghera transmission site a mountain and radio/television transmission site in County Clare, Ireland.
- Maghera village, Vârfu Câmpului Commune, Botoșani County, Romania
