= Glen River (County Down) =

River in Northern Ireland

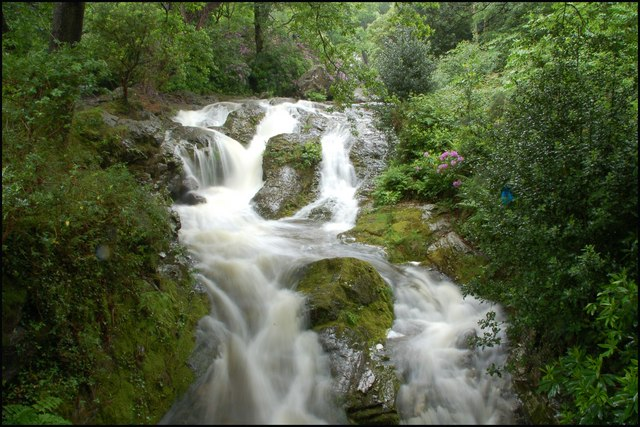
- The Glen River, Newcastle

Location
- Sovereign State: United Kingdom
- Constituent Country: Northern Ireland

Physical characteristics
- Source
  - location: The foot of Slieve Commedagh and Slieve Donard
  - coordinates: 54°06′00″N 6°16′00″W
- Mouth
  - location: Dundrum Bay at Newcastle
- Length: 3.2 km (2.0 mi)

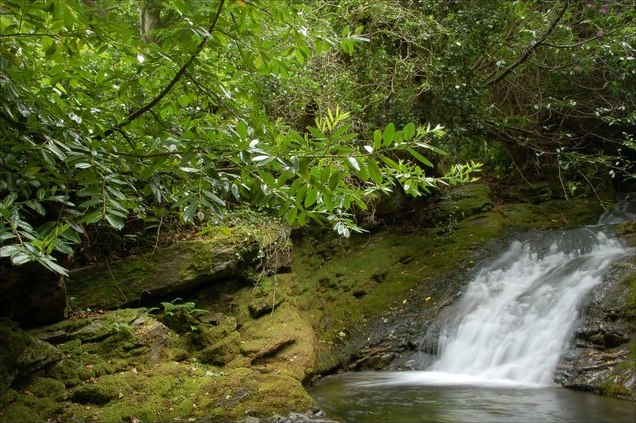
The Glen River, Newcastle

Glen River is a short river in County Down, Northern Ireland. The two-mile (3.2 km) course flows north-east from the foot of Slieve Commedagh and Slieve Donard in the Mourne Mountains into Dundrum Bay at Newcastle, descending 1,500 feet (460 m).

It is quite a fast-flowing river with many small waterfalls and deep pools. The bedrock is composed of granite in the upper parts, becoming dark shale lower down. It flows through Donard Forest and Donard Park and is crossed by five bridges. The path that runs alongside the river is commonly used by walkers climbing Slieve Donard.

== Geography and Geology ==
The upper section of the river flows over granite bedrock, while the lower section transitions to dark shale, typical of the Mourne region.

== Surroundings and Access ==
The Glen River passes through Donard Forest and Donard Park, areas frequently used by walkers and hikers, particularly those ascending Slieve Donard. A maintained walking path runs alongside the river, providing access to the forest and mountain trails.

== Historical Features ==
Near the entrance to Donard Forest, there is an ice house constructed in the 1830s by the third Earl of Annesley. The prominent ice house is beside the river, just before it enters the forest. It was built by the third earl of Annseley in the 1830s to serve his Donard lodge residence. It was associated with Donard Lodge, a nearby estate, and is considered a notable example of 19th-century estate infrastructure. During winter, large quantities of ice were collected from the Glen River and the nearby Black Stairs waterfall for use in the ice house at Donard Lodge. The ice was used to preserve fish and game. Historical accounts indicate that the workers responsible for filling the ice house were provided with bread, cheese, heated beer, brandy, and rum during the process.

== Flora and Fauna ==
The forest and riverbanks support a variety of native plant and animal species and is the habitat for the Holly blue butterfly. Scots and Corsican Pine trees were planted in the early 20th century, and the area is known for its woodland and mountain ecosystems, including bird species and other wildlife typical of the region.

== Donard Lodge ==
Donard Lodge was constructed around 1830 by William, 3rd Earl Annesley, at the base of Slieve Donard. The northern elevation of the building was located near the Glen River. This section of the estate included the stable-yard and associated outbuildings. The surrounding demesne included approximately eighty acres designated as pleasure grounds. These grounds featured paths, ornamental vegetation, water features such as waterfalls and cascades, and various structures including a hermitage, shell house, spa house, spa well, dining houses, and stone bridges. The Glen River was integrated into the landscape design and infrastructure of the estate.

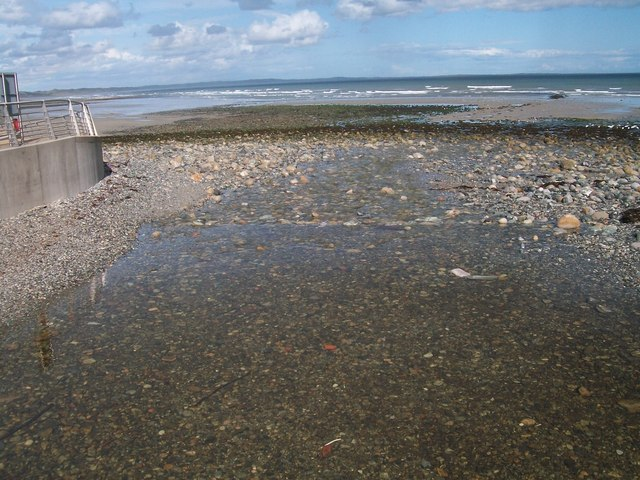
The mouth of the river

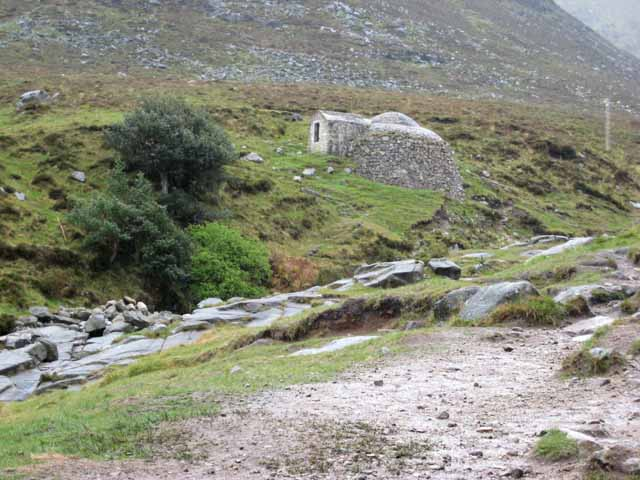
The Donard Icehouse
