= The New Castle, County Down =

Ruined castle in County Down, Northern Ireland

Coordinates: 54°12′35″N 5°53′24″W

The New Castle (Irish: An Caisleán Nua) is a ruined castle at the mouth of the Shimna River in Newcastle, County Down, Northern Ireland. The original castle is mentioned as early as 1433 and was built to guard a ford across the river. The castle was rebuilt in 1588 by Felix Magenis. It was demolished in 1830.
