= Mourne Observer =

Northern Irish newspaper

The Mourne Observer is a local newspaper in County Down, Northern Ireland. It currently has two editions, one for Down and one for South Down. Regular articles in the paper are 'Man About Town', where people write in to complain about things in the area and always has obituaries and features article written by local people. Its head office and printing works are on the Castlewellan Road in Newcastle, County Down.

It started publication in 1949.
