= Newcastle fishing disaster =

1843 maritime incident in Ireland

Coordinates: 54.197929°N 5.884612°W

The Newcastle fishing disaster occurred in Dundrum Bay, off the coast of Newcastle, County Down, on 13 January 1843. Fishing boats from Newcastle and Annalong were caught in gale force winds. Fourteen boats sank, killing 73 men.

== The storm ==
On the morning of Friday 13 January, 16 fishing boats from Newcastle and Annalong set out to herring fishing grounds. The conditions were unusually calm, as a result they travelled further from the shore than normal. At approximately midday, the wind suddenly changed from a southerly to north westerly direction, increasing in strength and bringing snowy squalls. A few boats attempted to return to shore but most were overcome immediately. The disaster was witnessed from shore and a number of people attempted a rescue, twelve of whom died. In total 73 people died and 14 boats sank, including one that had gone to the rescue. George Thompson from Glasdrumman, located between Newcastle and Annalong, saved eight people when he hauled their boat ashore. He was awarded an RNLI Silver Medal which is now located in the Down County Museum.

== Aftermath ==
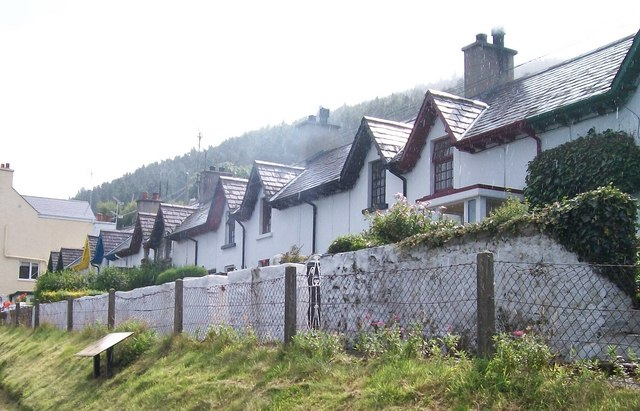
Widows' Row

A Public Subscription raised over £1000 for the 27 widows and 118 children left. A group of 12 cottages, known as widows' row, was built for the worst affected families. The cottages are located close to Newcastle Harbour.

In May 2013, 170 years after the disaster, a ceremony was held in remembrance at Newcastle Harbour. A commemorative plaque was unveiled and a wreath was laid in the water by members of the RNLI.

There are a number of local ballads written about the disaster, including The Newcastle Fishermen and The Glasdrumman Fishermen, both of which recount the disaster and the grief felt after.

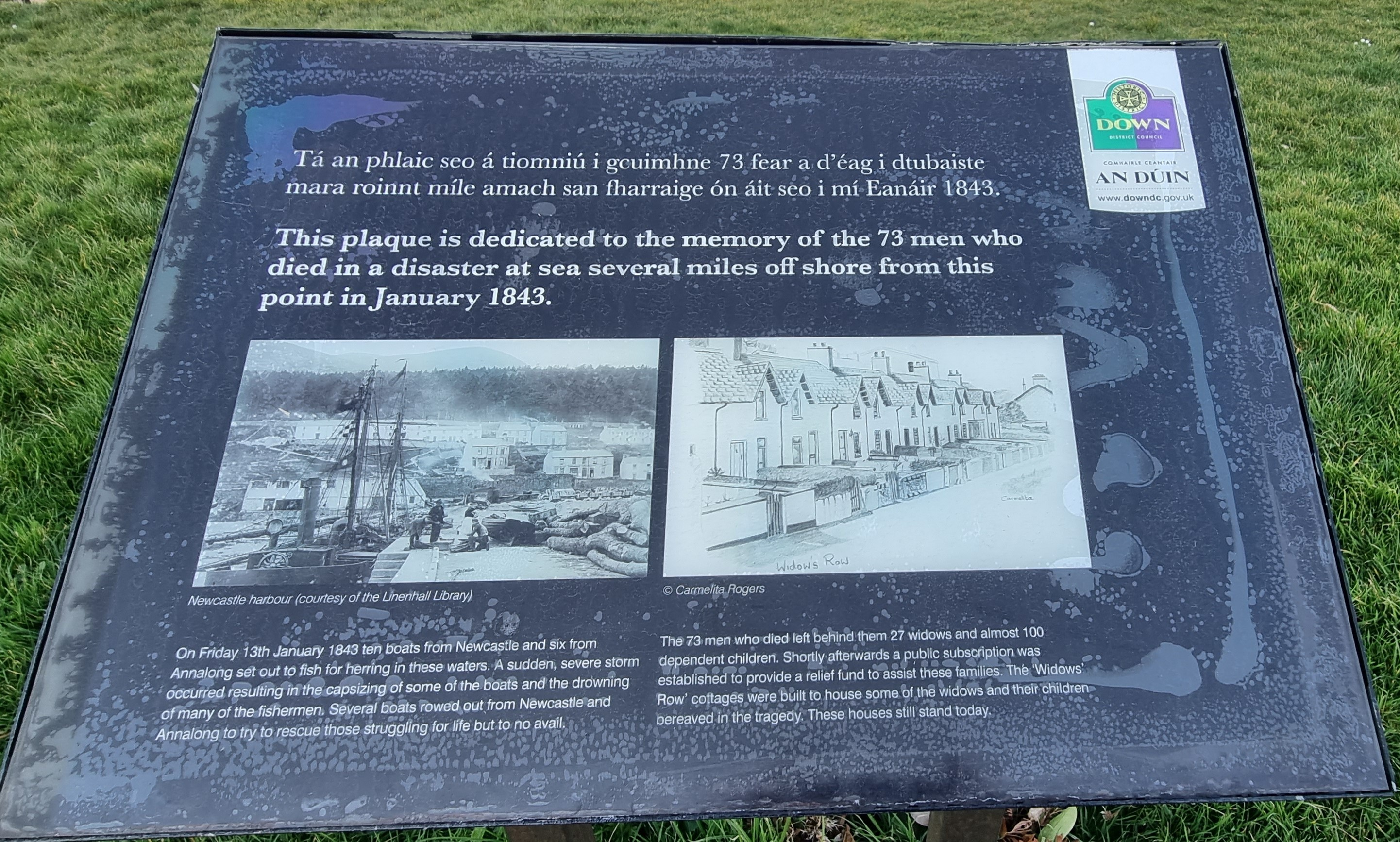
Information panel with details on the Newcastle fishing disaster
