= Donard Park =

Nature reserve in Northern Ireland

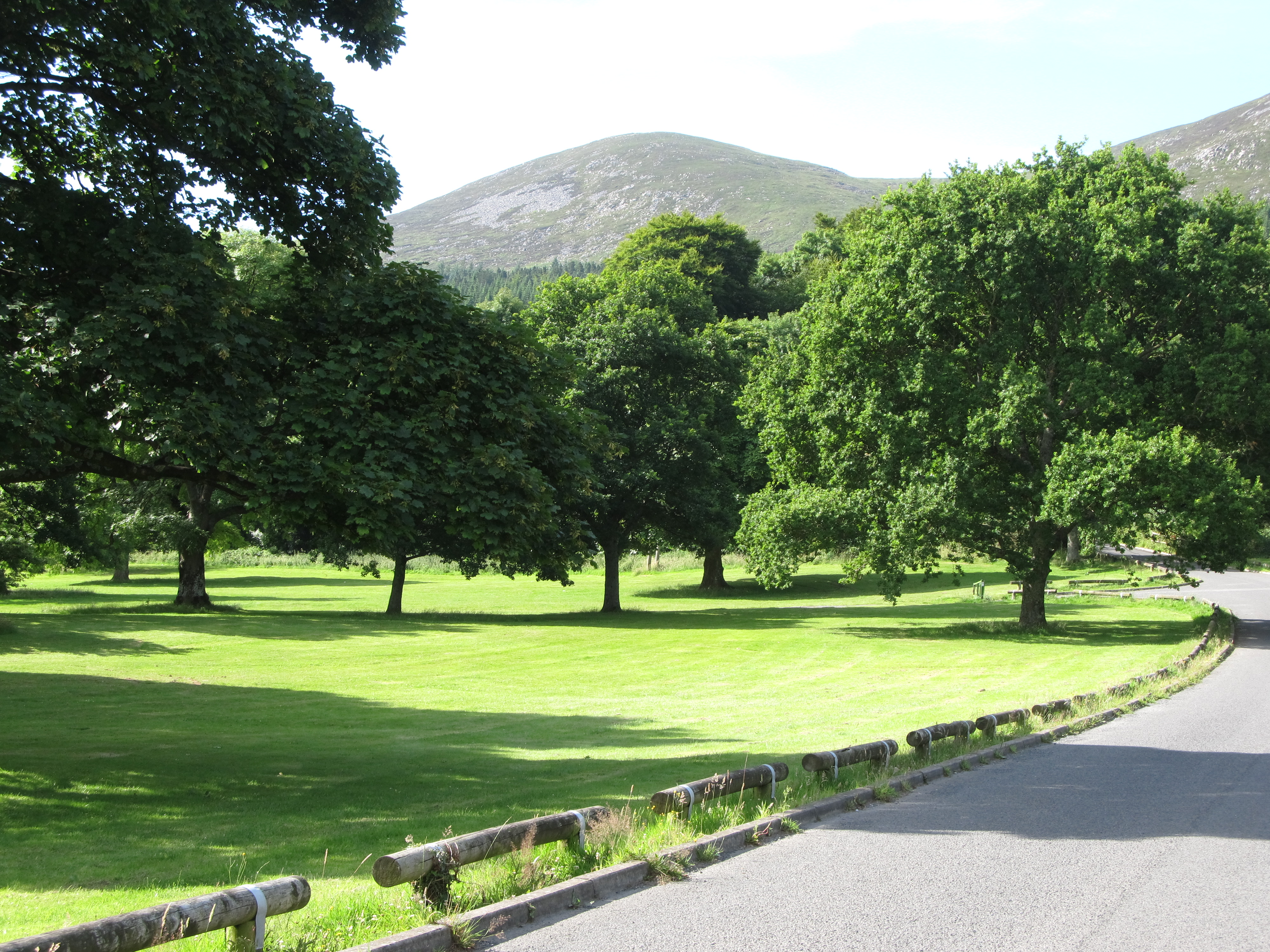
- Donard Park with Slieve Donard behind

- Location within Northern Ireland
- Type: Public park
- Location: Newcastle, County Down, Northern Ireland
- Nearest city: Belfast
- OS grid: J375305
- Coordinates: 54.2040°N 5.9030°W
- Elevation: Approx. 10 m
- Founder: Annesley family
- Owner: Down District Council
- Operator: Down District Council
- Open: All year
- Status: Open
- Camp sites: YMCA centre with camping
- Paths: Woodland and riverside paths
- Terrain: Forested foothills, riverside
- Water: Glen River
- Vegetation: Mixed woodland
- Species: Holly Blue Butterfly, local fauna
- Designation: Area of Outstanding Natural Beauty
- Parking: 333 regular spaces, 25 accessible, 2 EV bays
- Public transit: Coach parking available
- Facilities: Toilets, picnic areas, sports pitches
- Website: Visit Mourne Mountains – Donard Park

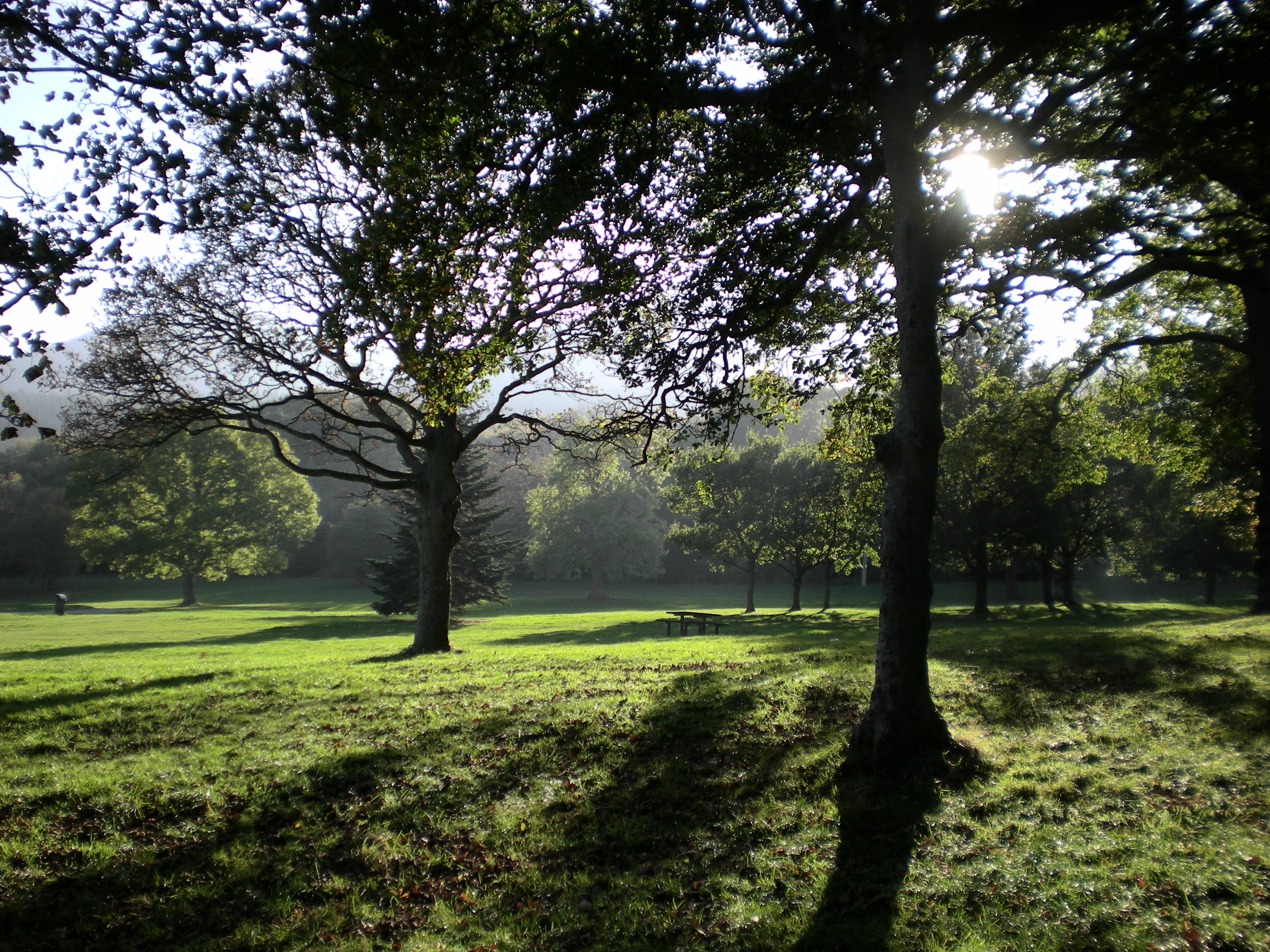
Donard Park, October 2007

Donard Park is a public park located in Newcastle, County Down, Northern Ireland. It is next to the Glen River, which forms the boundary along one side and is at the foot of Slieve Donard, the highest mountain in Northern Ireland, part of the Mourne Mountains. It is owned and run by Down District Council.

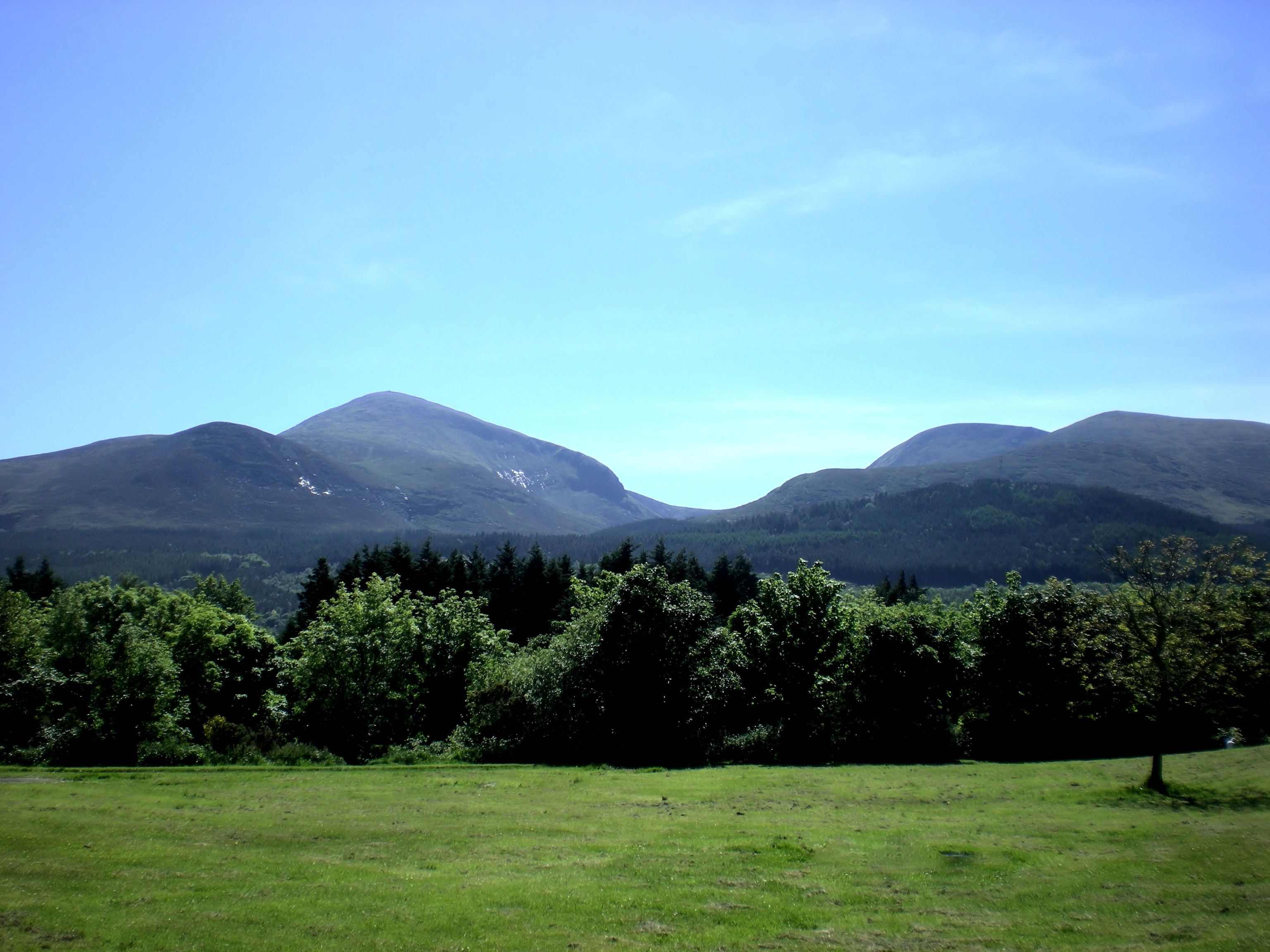
View of the Mourne Mountains as seen from the park

== Features ==
The park features football and hockey pitches and picnic facilities. It is also used as a starting point for ramblers to climb the Mourne Mountains and has a YMCA centre including camping facilities. In 2006 the main entrance and car park were redeveloped and facilities upgraded. There are future plans for retail space and rentable accommodation beside the park. The local council have been petitioned to build a swimming pool in the park and had put in a request for a Northern Ireland National Cycling Velodrome Centre to be built there for the 2012 London Olympics. In 2008 local planners indicated they would not back the construction of the scheme in an area of outstanding natural beauty at the foothills of the Mournes. The council is now seeking alternative sites.

== History ==
The park was previously owned by the Annesley family until given over to the people of Newcastle and the local council took responsibility for maintaining it. During World War I members of the 10th Battalion of Royal Irish Rifles were stationed at Donard lodge in the park for training, before being sent to the Somme in France.

During World War II members of the U.S. Army 5th infantry division were based in Donard Park in preparation for D-Day. They arrived in late October 1943.
