= Newcastle, County Down =

Seaside resort town in Northern Ireland

Coordinates: 54.215°N 5.890°W

Newcastle: Irish: An Caisleán Nua; Scots: Newkessel
- Town
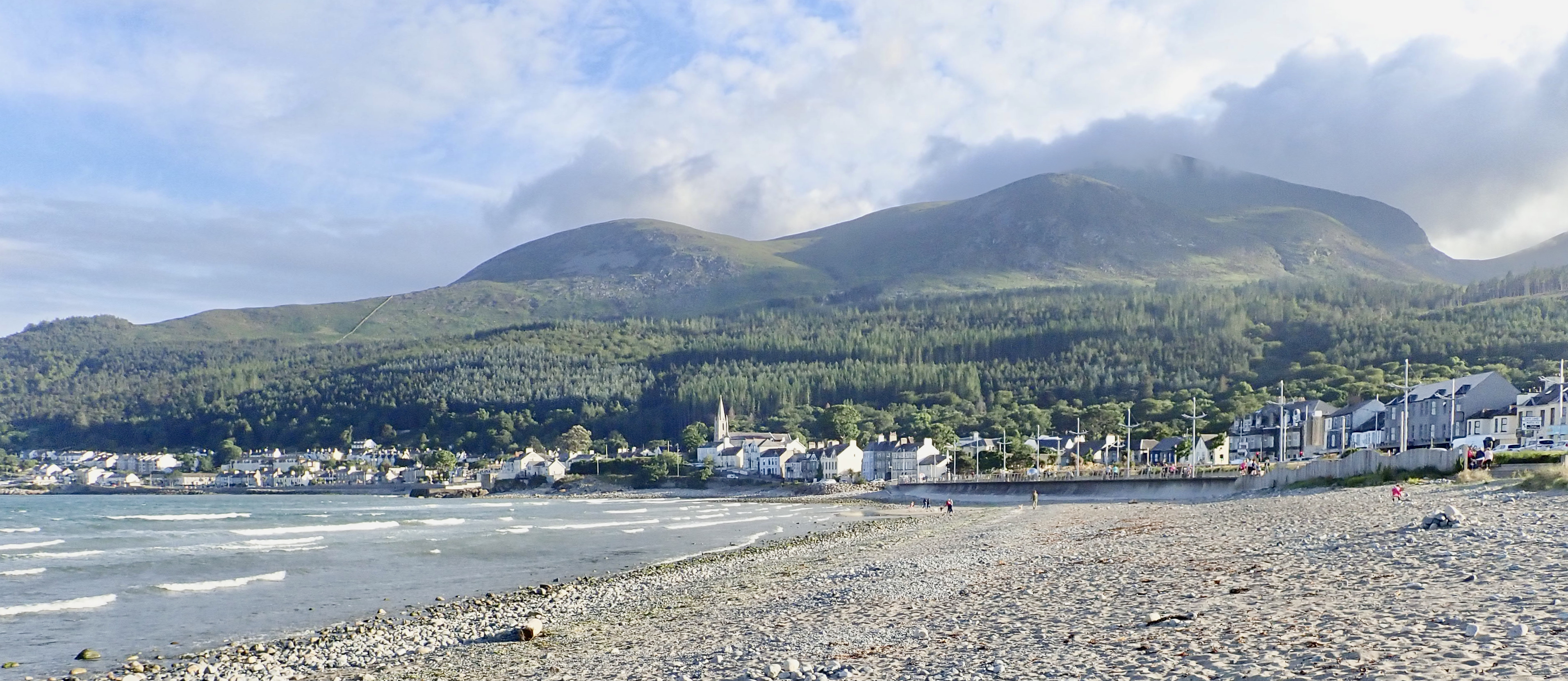
- Newcastle from the beach, with Slieve Donard in the background

- Location within County Down
- Population: 8,298 (2021 census)
  - Belfast: 32.5 miles (52.3 km)
- District: Newry, Mourne and Down
- County: County Down
- Country: Northern Ireland
- Sovereign state: United Kingdom
- Post town: NEWCASTLE
- Postcode district: BT33
- Dialling code: 028
- Police: Northern Ireland
- Fire: Northern Ireland
- Ambulance: Northern Ireland
- UK Parliament: South Down
- NI Assembly: South Down

Newcastle is a small seaside resort town in County Down, Northern Ireland, which had a population of 8,298 at the 2021 Census. It lies by the Irish Sea at the foot of Slieve Donard, the highest of the Mourne Mountains. Newcastle is known for its main street, sandy beach, forests (Donard Forest, and Tollymore Forest Park), and mountains. The town lies within the Newry, Mourne and Down District.

The town aims to promote itself as the "activity resort" for Northern Ireland. It has benefited from a multi-million pound upgrade to the promenade and main street. The town is twinned with New Ross, County Wexford, in the Republic of Ireland.

== History ==
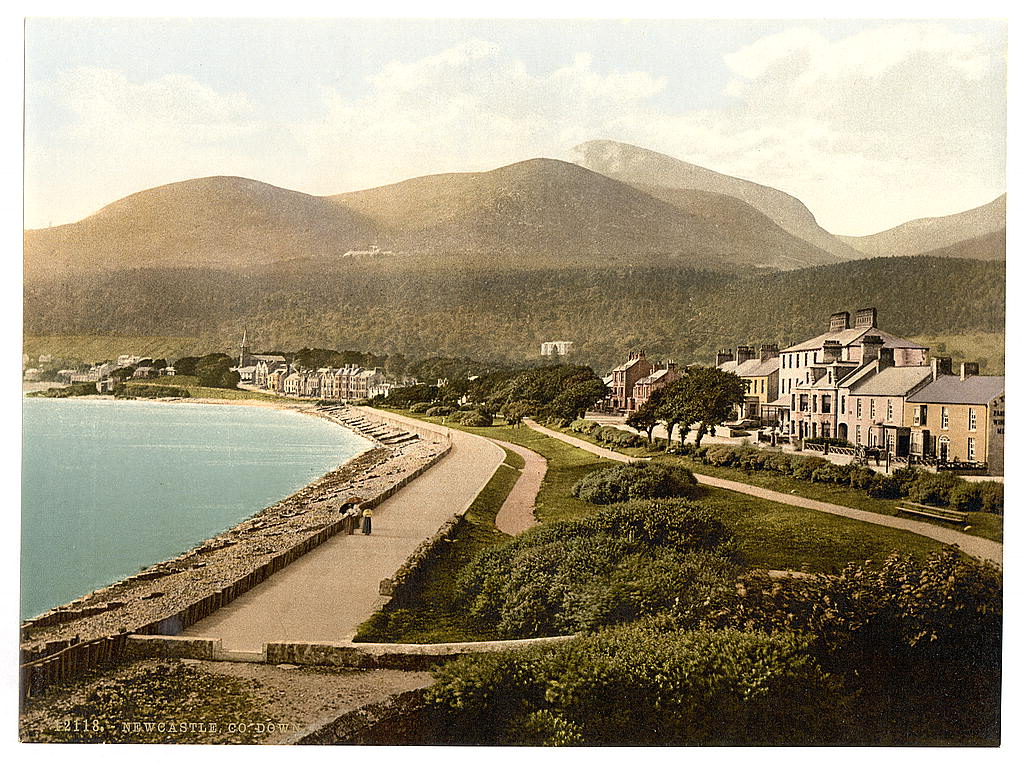
A photochrom print of Newcastle in the 1890s

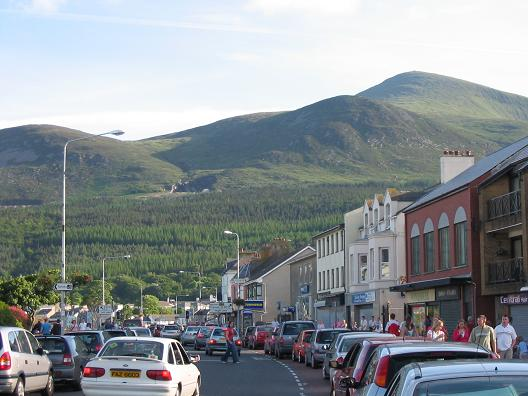
View from main street in Newcastle towards Slieve Donard, the highest peak of the Mourne Mountains.

The name of the town is thought to derive from the castle built by Felix Magennis of the Magennis clan in 1588, which stood at the mouth of the Shimna River. This castle was demolished in 1830. The town is referred to as New Castle in the Annals of the Four Masters in 1433, so it is likely that he built on the site of an existing structure.

The Montgomery Manuscripts record that Newcastle was besieged and later captured by Sir James Montgomery of the Ards in April 1642 in the aftermath of the 1641 Rebellion (pp.128–134). Prior to 1641 the Castle belonged to the Magennis', but after the rebellion the property was confiscated and granted to Robert Hawkins, great grandfather to Robert Hawkins who assumed the surname of Magill. The date 1588 was inscribed on a stone placed over the front entrance of the Castle, built by Felix Magenis. Newcastle passed from the Magills to the Mathews, and subsequently to the Annesleys. In the late 1700s the Castle was modernised by the Matthews and then the Annesleys, and rented by the Board of Customs for the accommodation of revenue officers. Around 1830 the castle was demolished and the 'Annesley Arms Hotel' was constructed within the original castle compound. The 3rd Earl Annesley built a new 'marine residence', called 'Donard Lodge' on the lower mountain slope above the town (it was demolished in 1966). St. John's Church was also opened on 'The Rock' in 1832 to accommodate the visitors and growing population in Earl Annesley's developing seaside resort.

The Newcastle fishing disaster occurred on 13 January 1843 when boats from Newcastle and Annalong set out for the usual fishing stations, and were caught in a gale. 14 boats were lost in the heavy seas including a boat which had gone to the rescue. Only two boats survived, the Victoria and the Brothers. 73 men perished, 46 of whom were from Newcastle. They left twenty-seven widows, one hundred and eighteen children, and twenty-one dependents. A public subscription was raised and the cottages, known as Widows Row, were built for the widows and dependents. A local song about the disaster says "Newcastle town is one long street entirely stripped of men"

In 1910 Harry Ferguson flew a small plane across Newcastle beach in one of the first engine powered flights by aircraft in Ireland. He completed the flight in an attempt to win a £100 prize offered by the town for the first powered flight along the strand. His first take off ended badly, but according to a modern newspaper report 'He flew a distance of almost three miles along the foreshore at a low altitude varying between fifty and five hundred feet'. This event is recorded by a plaque on the promenade.

Information on the town's history is available on signs throughout the forests and hills. The Mourne Mountains is the setting for many local myths and legends. There are stories of 'The Blue Lady', a woman abandoned by her husband whose ghost still haunts the mountains, and more recently the idea of a wild cat living in the Mournes. Many of the stories although have true origins are only folklore and give many of the town's attractions their names, such as Maggie's Leap being named after a local girl called Maggie, who leapt over the impressive chasm to her death while fleeing soldiers with a basket of eggs. Many other places in the Newcastle area get their names from other sources, 'The Brandy Pad', a path through the mountains, is named so because of the illegal brandy smuggling that took place through the area. Another example is Bogey Hill just above the harbour at the Southern end of the town, which is named after the carts that carried Mourne granite from the quarry on Thomas Mountain down to the harbour. In 1897, T.R.H. The Duke and Duchess of York (the future George V and Queen Mary), grandparents to Queen Elizabeth II, visited Newcastle to open the Slieve Donard Hotel. Afterwards they visited the 5th Earl Annesley at Castle Wellan (also known as Castlewellan Castle).

A process of preserving the local history has begun since 2014 via a community Facebook page 'History of Newcastle, Co. Down'. Photographs and information on the area's history are being collected via the page, and a history of the town will be published. Greater historical detail about the town will be added to this page as part of this research process. It is hoped that this collective history will enhance the experience of both locals and tourists by promoting an informed historical appreciation for the area.

Newcastle was fortunate enough to escape the worst of the Troubles and its residents both Catholic and Protestant lived in relative peace with each other though there has been considerable objection to loyalist band parades in the town.

In 2026 Newcastle Library was chosen by Poet Laureate Simon Armitage as one of the venues for his annual library tour which in that year visited libraries in places with initials N-P.

== Demography ==
=== 2021 Census ===
As of the 2021 census there were 8,298 people living in Newcastle. Of these:

- 69.1% belong to or were brought up in the Catholic faith and 21.7% belong to or were brought up in a 'Protestant and Other Christian (including Christian related)' faiths.
- 43.9% indicated that they had an Irish national identity, 37.4% had a Northern Irish national identity and an additional 25.7% had a British national identity (respondents could indicate more than one national identity).

=== 2011 Census ===
Newcastle is classified as a small town by the Northern Ireland Statistics and Research Agency (NISRA) (i.e. with population between 4,500 and 10,000 people). As of the 2011 census there were 7,672 people living in Newcastle. Of these:

- 98% were white
- 70.3% belong to or were brought up in the Catholic faith and 24.4% belong to or were brought up in a 'Protestant and Other Christian (including Christian related)' faiths.
- 36% indicated that they had an Irish national identity, 36% had a Northern Irish national identity and an additional 33% had a British national identity (respondents could indicate more than one national identity)

== Climate ==
Climate data for Murlough (12m elevation) 1991–2020
Month	Jan	Feb	Mar	Apr	May	Jun	Jul	Aug	Sep	Oct	Nov	Dec	Year
Mean daily maximum °C (°F)	8.3 (46.9)	8.9 (48.0)	10.5 (50.9)	12.4 (54.3)	15.3 (59.5)	17.6 (63.7)	19.1 (66.4)	19.1 (66.4)	17.3 (63.1)	14.1 (57.4)	10.9 (51.6)	8.7 (47.7)	13.5 (56.3)
Daily mean °C (°F)	5.6 (42.1)	5.8 (42.4)	7.0 (44.6)	8.6 (47.5)	11.1 (52.0)	13.6 (56.5)	15.3 (59.5)	15.2 (59.4)	13.6 (56.5)	10.8 (51.4)	7.8 (46.0)	6.0 (42.8)	10.1 (50.2)
Mean daily minimum °C (°F)	2.9 (37.2)	2.8 (37.0)	3.5 (38.3)	4.8 (40.6)	7.0 (44.6)	9.6 (49.3)	11.4 (52.5)	11.4 (52.5)	9.9 (49.8)	7.4 (45.3)	4.8 (40.6)	3.3 (37.9)	6.6 (43.9)
Average precipitation mm (inches)	108.9 (4.29)	78.4 (3.09)	75.9 (2.99)	64.0 (2.52)	65.4 (2.57)	68.6 (2.70)	69.0 (2.72)	83.1 (3.27)	72.3 (2.85)	99.8 (3.93)	112.3 (4.42)	103.5 (4.07)	1,001.3 (39.42)
Average precipitation days (≥ 1.0 mm)	13.9	11.4	11.8	10.7	11.0	10.7	11.0	12.3	10.1	12.3	14.3	13.4	143.0
Mean monthly sunshine hours	43.0	79.0	112.3	153.2	182.8	144.9	143.5	149.6	121.6	98.9	61.6	46.9	1,337.3
Source: Met Office

== Tourism ==
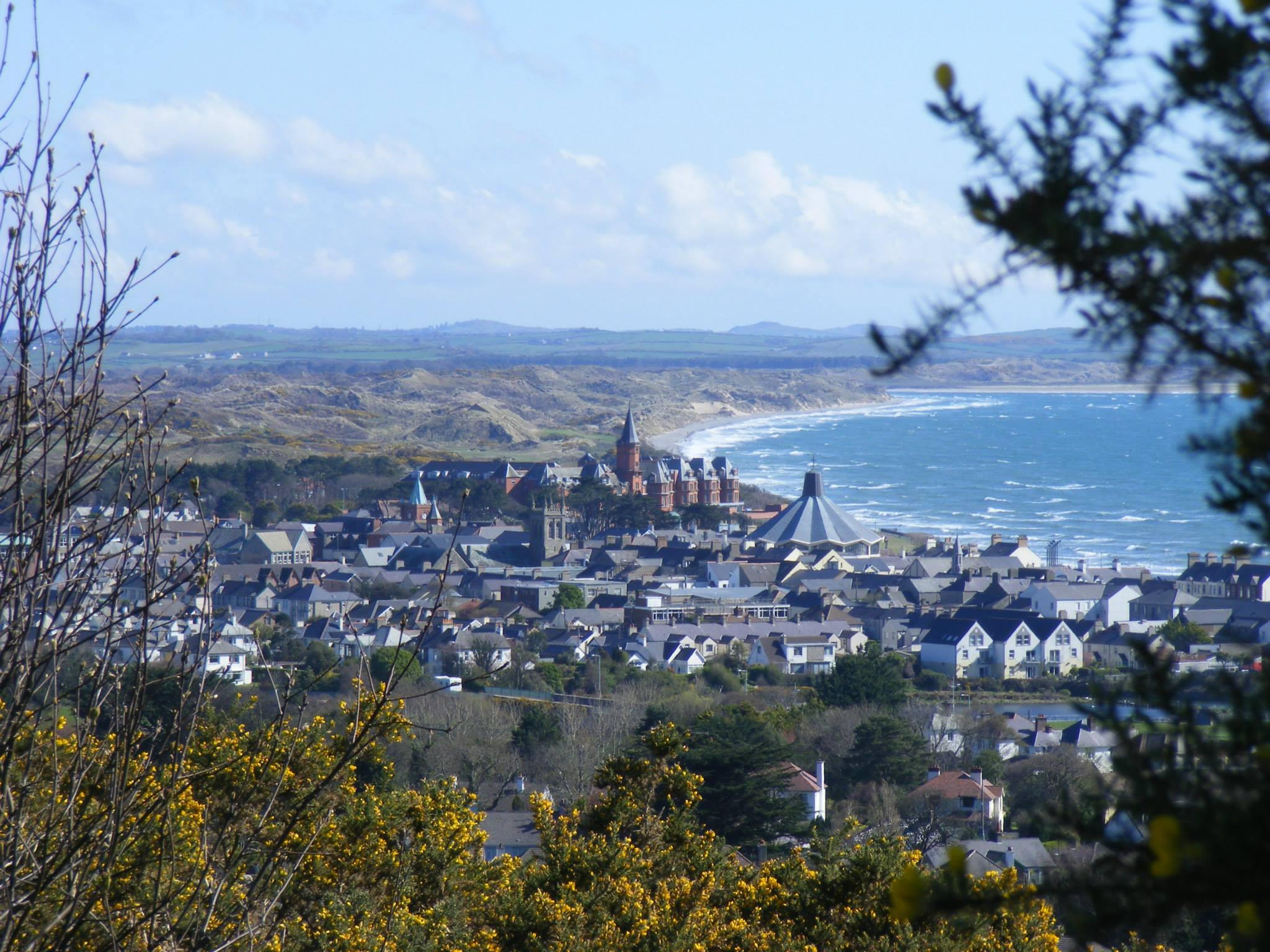
Newcastle from Donard Forest, with Murlough Nature Reserve beyond

In 2006, the Newcastle promenade won national awards including a Civic Trust Award for Excellence in the Public Realm. The town has hosted a large Halloween festival, a free event. While the crime rate in Newcastle has been relatively low, there is a stronger police presence during peak holiday periods due to the increase in petty crimes.

Newcastle is close to Northern Ireland's highest mountain, Slieve Donard, in the Mourne Mountains. Visitors hike the mountains, about which The Mountains of Mourne was written by Percy French. The local Royal County Down Golf Club was venue for the 2007 Walker Cup and 2015 Irish Open. The course was said to be one of Tiger Woods' favourites.

The town is also known for Mourne Granite, which was quarried here for many years and shipped all round the world. It was used to make paving stones in many cities including London and New York. Mourne granite was used to make the base of the 9/11 memorial in New York.

Since 2010, Newcastle has held an annual 'Festival of Flight' airshow which attracts upwards of 100,000 people to the event. The RAF Red Arrows are usually the star attraction of the show which is heavily supported by both the RAF and Irish Air Corps as well as the Irish Coast Guard. Many of the UK's top civilian air displays have also visited Newcastle on a regular basis.

=== Places of interest ===
Sandy beach and Dunes, 2 miles north from Newcastle.

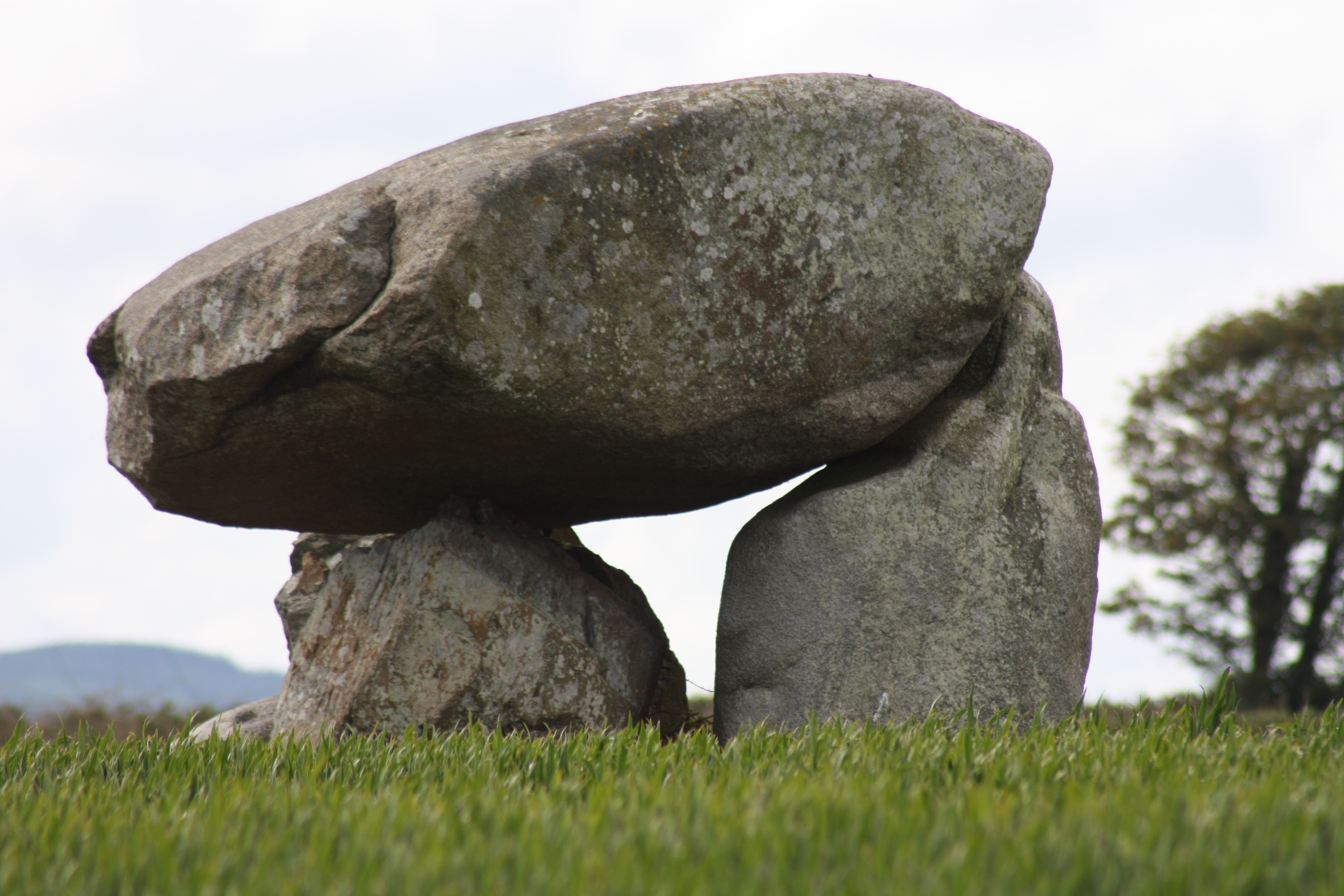
Slidderyford Dolmen

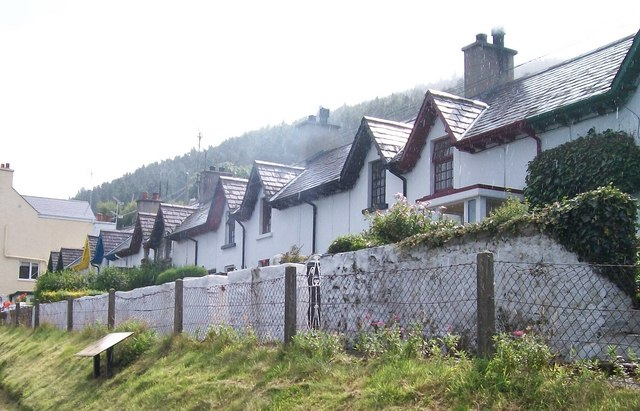
Widows' Row. This is a terrace of twelve small houses built by public subscription to house the widows and orphans of 46 fishermen lost in the storm of 1843.

- The Mourne Mountains lie south of the town and the local area includes the Tollymore Forest Park and Donard Park. The Shimna River flows through Tollymore Park and enters the sea at Newcastle.
- The Murlough Nature Reserve is situated between Dundrum and Newcastle. The rugged sand dunes and beach are National Trust property.
- Slidderyford Dolmen is a Neolithic portal tomb located near the entrance to Murlough Nature Reserve. It is composed of four stones, two granite and two slate.
- Saint Patrick's Stream – in popular mythology, the Mourne Mountains was the site where Saint Patrick banished the 'snakes' from Ireland, and that in his first landings to Ireland he visited the Mournes and even converted the local hill folk to Christianity. The small stream is said to mark the boundary of the Kingdom of Mourne and legend has it that there is a rock in the stream with his hand print in it where he knelt down to drink the water.
- Newcastle Harbour – In 1820, Lord Annesley created a pier as a loading point for the famous Mourne granite.
- The Bloody Bridge – The bridge and the Bloody Bridge River, were so named because of an incident during the 1641 Rebellion, during which a massacre of Protestants took place. The bridge is sometimes visited by tourists who go to see the 'Brandy Pad', called after the trade of illegal brandy which was smuggled down this route and from there onwards at the dead of night to Hilltown. The remains of an ancient church and the old bridge which once carried the coast road can still be seen.
- Widows Row. A set of listed cottages just south of the harbour, built by public subscription after the Newcastle Fishing disaster of 1843.
- The Bendy Tree on The Promanade was the winner of the 2026 Tree of the Year competition. It is a wych elm tree that grows almost horizontally, shaped by the seafront winds.

== Education ==
There is one post-primary school in Newcastle, Shimna Integrated College, founded in 1994 as an all-ability, non-selective, 11-18 school. There are four primary schools. St. Mary's Primary School was formerly St. Mary's Boys Primary School and St. Mary's Girls Primary School. The school became mixed in September 2001 but remained split over the two sites, younger children at one and older children at the other until recent years. A new building, large enough to support all the students has since been built. All Children's Integrated Primary School was founded in 1986 and was the first primary school outside Belfast that was fully religiously integrated. Given their close proximity to each other, when All Children’s Integrated Primary School was being renovated in the early 2000s, the school worked from the grounds of Shimna Integrated College. The temporary classrooms were portacabins. Eventually, the work finished in 2004 when the primary school could move back to their old site which is known by locals as ‘The Walled Garden’. The other two schools are Newcastle Primary School, founded in 1962, and St. Joseph's Primary School, founded in 1838. There is also a Technical College in the town.

== Sport ==
Newcastle F.C. plays in the Northern Amateur Football League.

Tollymore United F.C plays in the Mid Ulster Football League.

Newcastle Harbour is home to Newcastle Yacht Club who regularly sail and race in Dundrum Bay.

Bryansford GAC are the local GAA team.

Newcastle and District A.C. is the local athletics club

== Transport ==
Newcastle railway station began operating on 25 March 1869 and closed on 2 May 1955. The Belfast and County Down Railway Station and Clock Tower is a B1 listed, red brick building, built in 1905; The Great Northern Railway of Ireland Station Building is used by Ulsterbus, which runs buses to Belfast Grand Central station, as well as other towns in the area.

== Media ==
- The local newspaper is called The Mourne Observer.

== Location ==
Newcastle is located at the foot of the Mourne Mountains on the east coast of Northern Ireland, and at the confluence of three rivers, the Shimna, the Burren, and the Tullybranigan. In relation to other settlements, Newcastle is 19 kilometres from Downpatrick and 51 kilometres from Belfast.

== Notable people ==
- Florence Balcombe (1858-1937), wife of writer Bram Stoker
- Peter O'Sullevan (1918–2015), broadcaster and horse racing commentator, born Newcastle
- Eddie Polland (born 1947), professional golfer, winner of four European Tour events
- Sean Rafferty (born 1947), broadcaster, spent his childhood in Newcastle.
- Richard Rowley (1877–1947), Poet and writer, lived in Newcastle in later life. During World War II he founded, and ran from his Newcastle home, the short-lived Mourne Press, which failed in 1942. The poet's Newcastle home, Brook Cottage, has been demolished. In Newcastle his name is remembered through the Rowley Meadows housing development and the Rowley Path, which runs along the southern boundary of the Islands Park.
- Simon Thornton (born 1977), professional golfer
- Martin Waddell (born 1941), Award-winning children's author, although born in Belfast has lived most of life in the town.

== See also ==
- List of RNLI stations
- List of localities in Northern Ireland by population
