= Maghera Churches and Round Tower =

Maghera Old Church and Round Tower
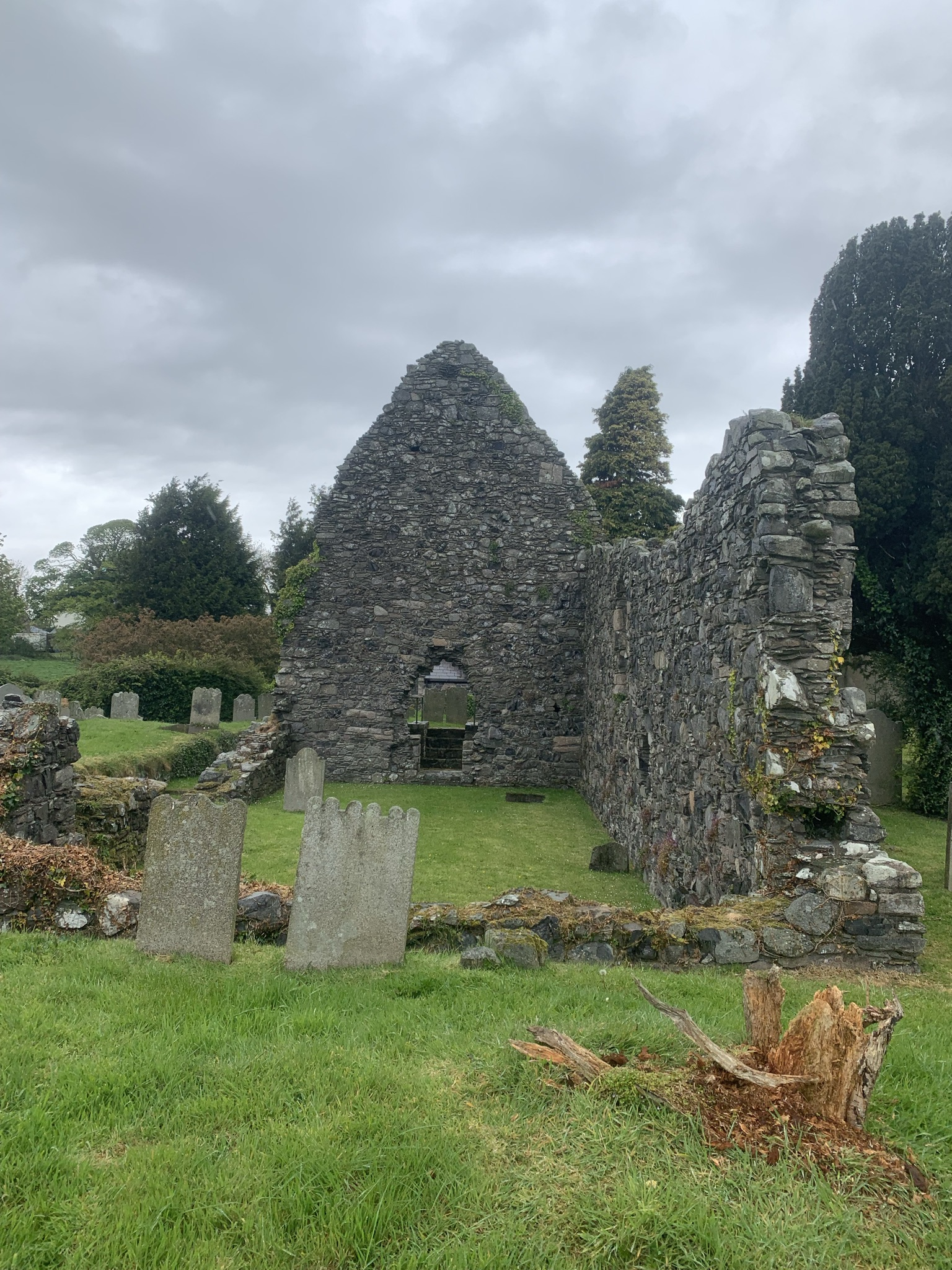
- Ruins of the old church

- Location within Northern Ireland
- 54.2375°N 5.8958°W
- Type: Ecclesiastical ruins
- Location: Maghera, County Down, Northern Ireland

History
- Founded: 6th Century
- Founder: St Donard
- Built: 10th Century (Round Tower); 13th Century (Church)

Site notes
- Governing body: Department for Communities

Scheduled monument
- Official name: Maghera Church and Round Tower
- Type: Monument in State Care
- Condition: Ruined
- Local Authority: Newry, Mourne and Down

Maghera Parish Church
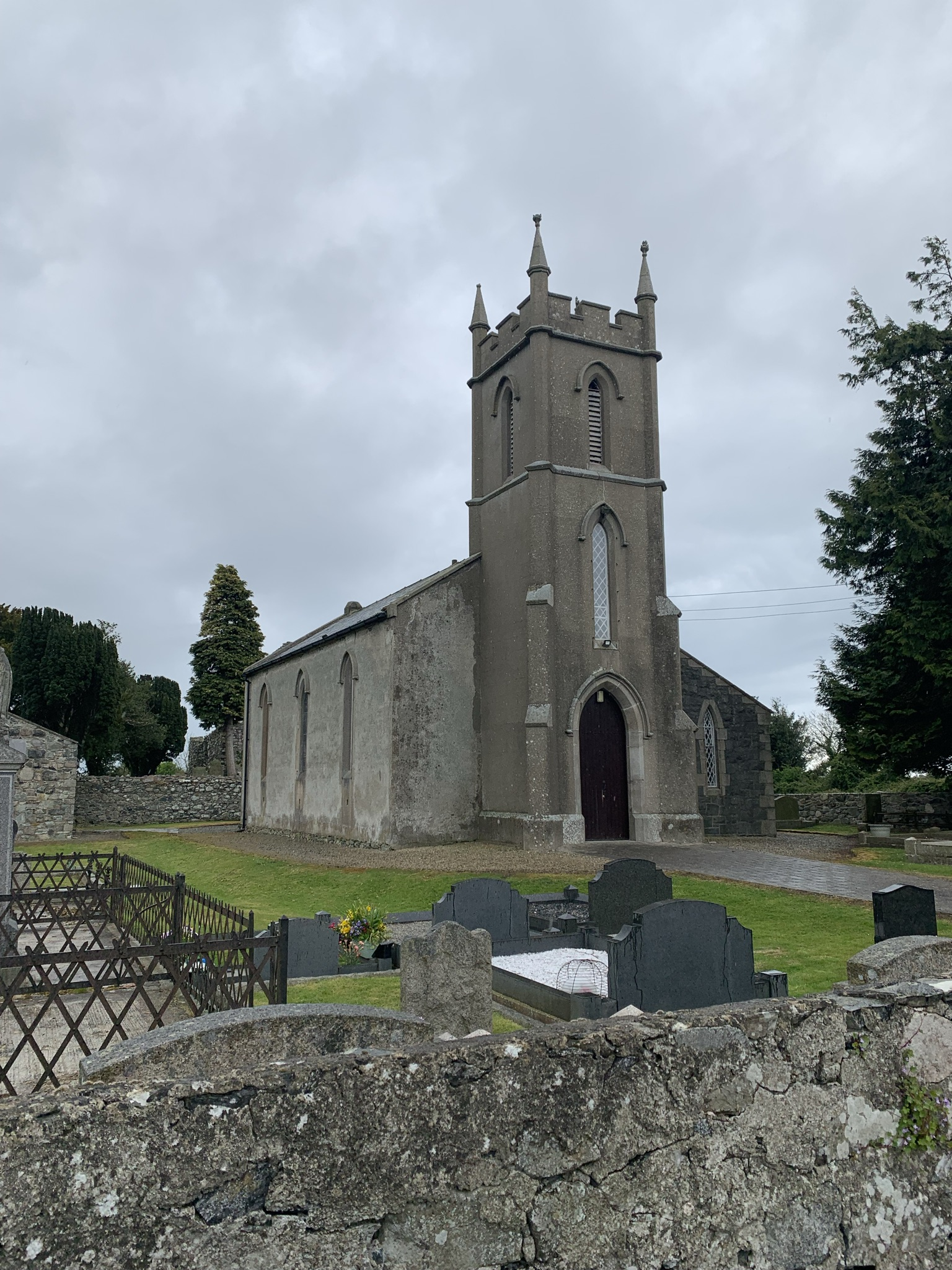
- Country: Northern Ireland
- Denomination: Church of Ireland

Architecture
- Functional status: Parish Church
- Heritage designation: Listed Building (B2)
- Designated: 1977
- Architect(s): John Bowden; Welland & Gillespie
- Completed: 1825

Administration
- Diocese: Down and Dromore
- Parish: Kilmegan (Dundrum) & Maghera

Maghera Churches and Round Tower is an ecclesiastical site in Maghera, County Down. It consists of the ruins of a 13th Century church (Maghera Old Church), Maghera Parish Church (built in 1825) and the stump of a 10th Century round tower. It is also the site of a monastery founded by St. Donard in the 6th century, and its graveyard confirms evidence that it was an early ecclesiastical site. Together the old church, round tower, and graveyard are a scheduled monument and monument in state care, referred to as "Maghera Church and Round Tower". The church built in 1825 is a functional Church of Ireland church and a listed building.

The site is built on a rath, which gave rise to Maghera's original name ‘Rathmurbhuilg’, which means ‘the rath at the sea wall’. Over the centuries the site was recorded variously as Portmurbhuilg, Rath, and Rathra, before settling on Maghera in the early 17th century.

== History ==
Two ecclesiastical sites were founded by Saint Donard (a fifth-century follower of Saint Patrick) at Slieve Donard (then called Sliabh Slanga); one at the base and one at the summit. Maghera Church is believed to be the site of the former. Gerald of Wales (c. 1146 – c. 1223) records that the presence of the ecclesiastical sites, and the strong association of the mountain with the saint, resulted in the mountain gaining its current name.

The church may have been an early church cathedral, with St. Donard as its first bishop. It was recorded that every church in Down and Connor with a round tower had a bishop. However, records of his successors do not exist. If it was its own see, it was likely incorporated into the Diocese of Down early on. At the end of the 12th century Maghera was included in a list of possessions of the see of Down, in a patent roll of the Tower of London.

There are further mentions of the church in 1306–7, when it was given a valuation of 20s, and in 1438 in a record about the collation of a rector of ‘St. Dongarde’s Parish Church’ (Dongarde being one of the numerous spellings for St. Donard).

The round tower likely dates from the 10th century, whilst the oldest part of the old church has been dated to the 13th century. It is likely there was an earlier ecclesiastical building closer to the round tower, but none of it remains.

In 1645 John Colgan claimed that the church held two relics of St. Donard; a bell called ‘The Glunan’ and a shoe enshrined in a covering of silver and gold. However, the relics have since disappeared, and may never have existed. In 1878 there appeared to be no other record of them, not even according to local tradition.

In 1710 the round tower was mostly destroyed by a storm, leaving a stump of around 5.5m.

The new church was built in 1825 to replace the medieval church, and is still in use as the Parish Church of Maghera.

There have been several excavations on the site over the years. The first recorded excavation took place in 1840 around the round tower. The only information from that excavation to survive is the discovery of burials in the vicinity of the round tower. More significant excavations occurred in 1965 and 1984 and helped to confirm the area as a site of Early Christianity, noting that the absence of English pottery around the round tower meant that the site pre-dated the arrival of the Anglo-Normans.

== Site monuments ==
Old Church: The old church was built as early as the 13th Century, and fairly typical of churches built in early Norman Ireland. It was plain with internal divisions between nave and chancel. It is of rubble construction, which incorporates numerous boulders. The west gable and north wall are still standing to their original height whilst the other two walls are nothing more than foundations. It is not recorded when the church became a ruin.

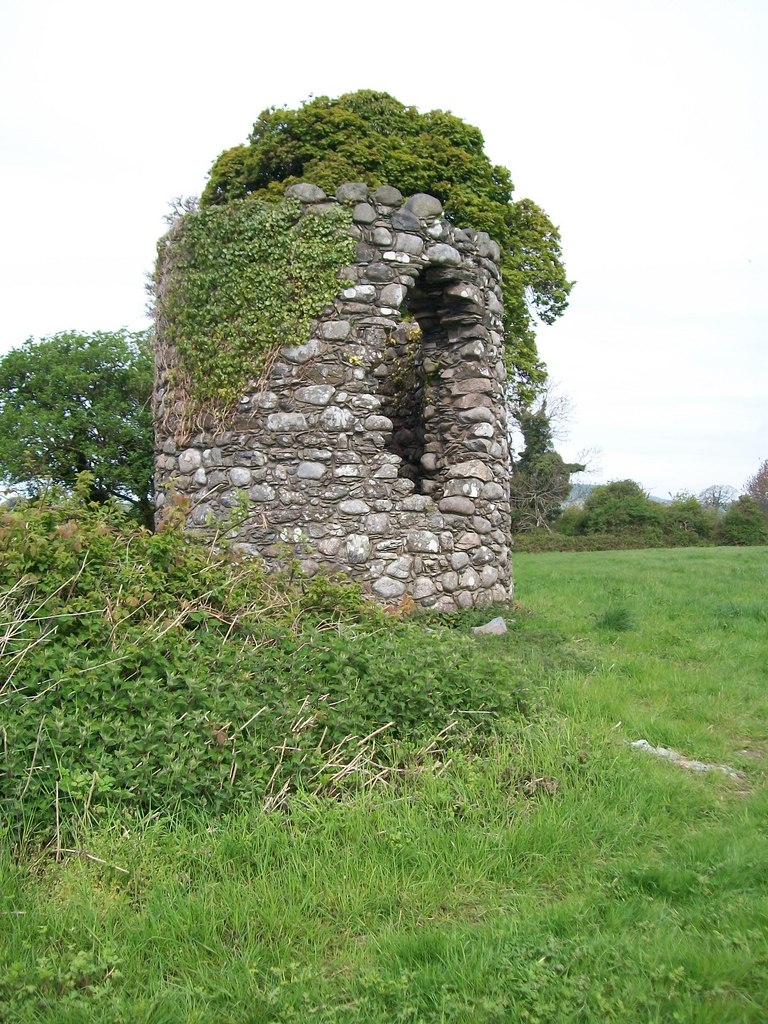
The Round Tower stump on the North-West of the site

New Church: The new church was built in 1825 and was partly founded by the Board of First Fruits. It was possibly designed by architect John Bowden, although he did not live to see it completed. It was modified in 1861 when the south aisle was built to designs by Welland and Gillespie. The building continues to be used by the Church of Ireland.

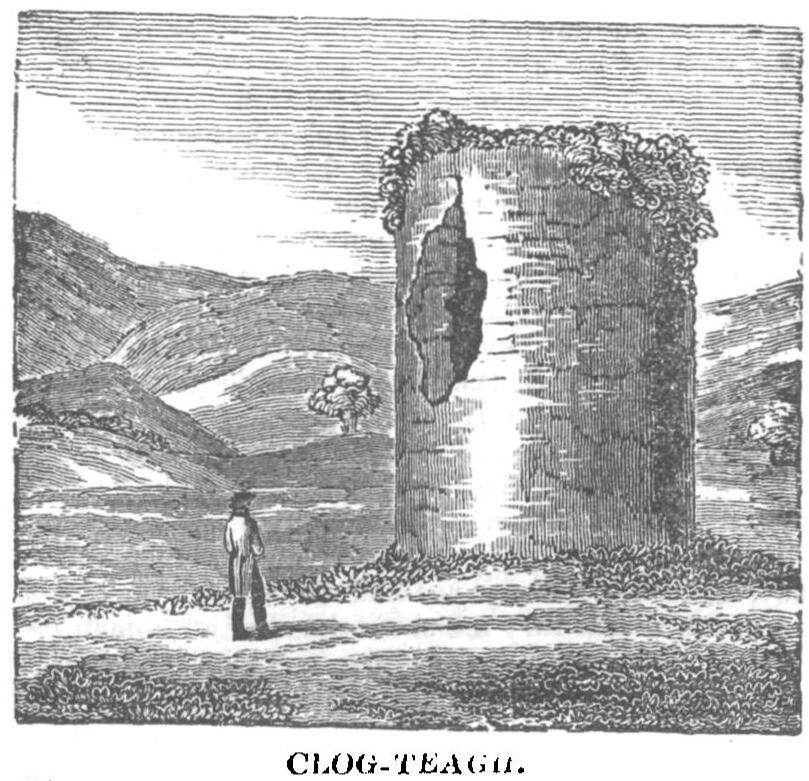
Clog-Teagh, Dublin Penny Journal 1836

Round Tower: The absence of any defining features makes the round tower quite hard to accurately date. The stones used in its construction suggest that it was built in the 10th century, although this isn't definitive proof. Around 1710 a great storm blew down the tower, leaving the roughly 5.5m stump still visible today.

Graveyard: The graveyard around the old church is roughly circular, and contains at least two slabs inscribed with Norman crosses. There is also a 13th-century coffin lid, which serves as a headstone in the south of the graveyard. At the boundary of the graveyard are the remains of a wall, which were previously believed to have been the walls of a cashel. However, it is more likely that these are simply the remains of a boundary wall.
