= Slieve Donard =

Highest mountain in Northern Ireland

- Sliabh Dónairt
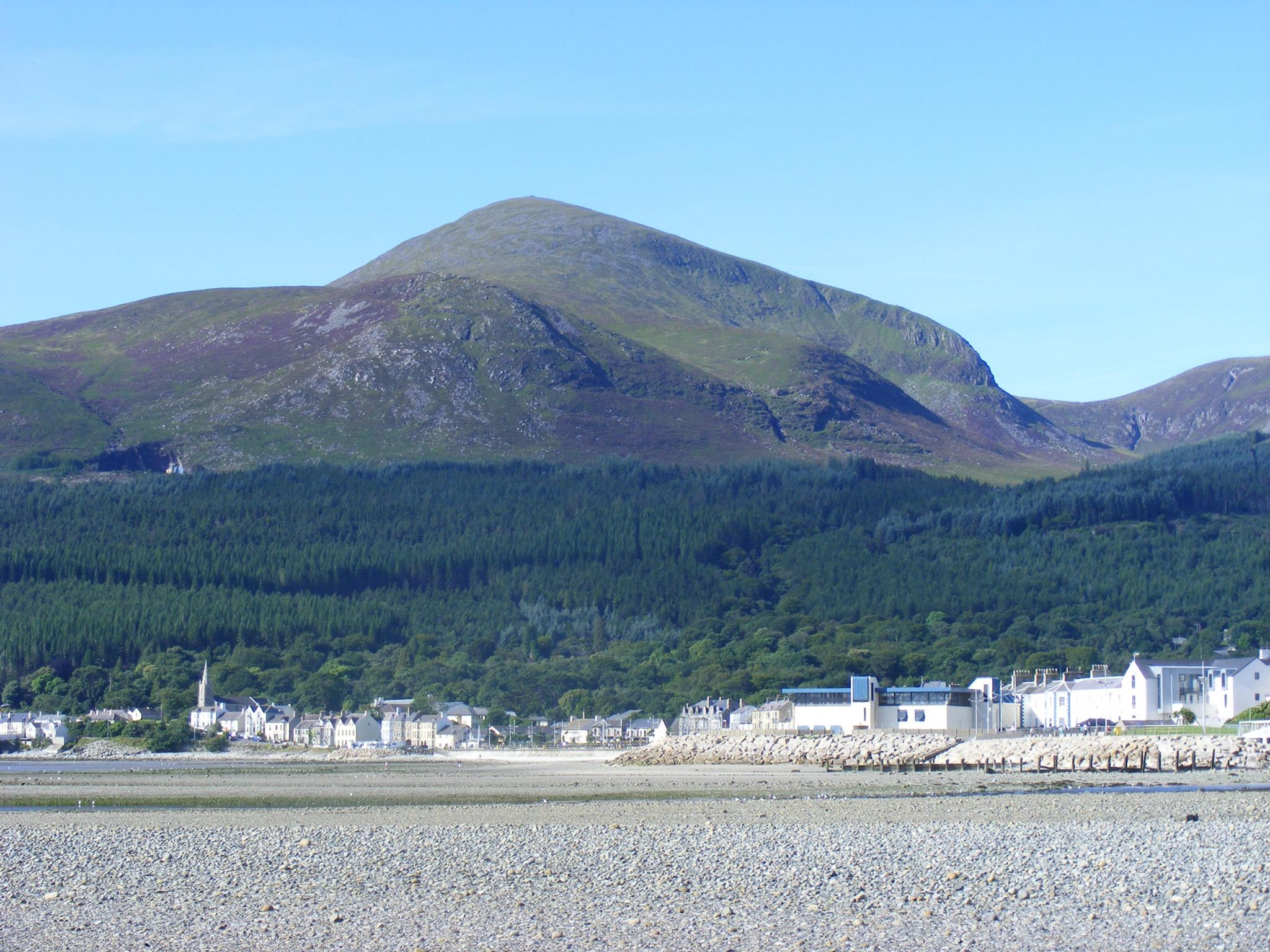
- Slieve Donard and Newcastle

Highest point
- Elevation: 850 m (2,790 ft)
- Prominence: 822 m (2,697 ft)
- Listing: County High Point (Down), P600, Marilyn, Hewitt, Arderin, Simm, Vandeleur-Lynam
- Coordinates: 54°10′49″N 5°55′15″W

Naming
- English translation: Dónairt's mountain
- Language of name: Irish

Geography
- Location within Northern Ireland Location within County Down Location within island of Ireland Location within the United Kingdom
- Location: County Down, Northern Ireland
- Parent range: Mournes
- OSI/OSNI grid: J357276
- Topo map: OSNI Discoverer 29

Geology
- Mountain type: Granite granophyre Bedrock

Slieve Donard (/ˌsliːv ˈdɒnərd/ SLEEV DON-ərd; from Irish Sliabh Dónairt, meaning 'Dónairt's mountain') is the highest mountain in Northern Ireland, the highest in Ulster, and the seventh-highest in Ireland, with a height of 850 metres (2,790 ft). The tallest of the Mourne Mountains, it is near the town of Newcastle on the eastern coast of County Down, overlooking the Irish Sea. It is also the tallest mountain in the northern half of Ireland.

The Mourne Wall – built in the early 20th century – runs up the western and southern slopes of the mountain, joining a small stone tower at the summit. Also on the summit are the remains of two ancient burial cairns, one of which is the remains of the highest known passage tomb in Ireland. In Irish mythology the mountain was associated with the mythical figures Boirche and Slángha. It was later associated with, and named after, Saint Donard, who was said to have made the summit his hermitage. Up until the 1830s, people would climb the mountain as part of a yearly pilgrimage, which may have originally been a Lughnasadh (harvest) ritual. Royal Engineers camped on the summit for four months in 1826 as part of the Ordnance Survey's Principal Triangulation.

== Geography ==
Slieve Donard sits at the northeastern edge of the Mournes, overlooking Newcastle and Dundrum Bay. It has two lesser summits on the seaward side – Millstone Mountain (460 m), and Crossone (540 m). Two glens separate Slieve Donard from the neighbouring mountains of Slieve Commedagh (to the northwest) and Chimney Rock Mountain or Slieve Neir (to the south). Slieve Commedagh, at 767 m (2,516 ft), is the second-highest of the Mourne Mountains.

The mountain is an easy climb although the path is very eroded at places. The most popular route begins at Donard Forest on the north side of the mountain and follows the Glen River and then the Mourne Wall to the summit. In recent years a stone path has been made on the steepest parts of the mountain. The summit has views of the coast, and as far afield as Belfast Lough, 30 miles (50 kilometres) north, Dublin Bay, 55 miles (90 kilometres) south, and the Isle of Man, to the east.

== Burial cairns ==
On the summit are the remains of two prehistoric burial cairns. The Great Cairn is at the highest point and measures about 1 m (3 ft 3 in) high, 36.5 m (119 ft 9 in) from north to south and 43 m (141 ft) from east to west. It appears to have been a Neolithic passage tomb, dating to 3300–3000 BC. It is the highest known passage tomb in Britain and Ireland. The Lesser Cairn lies 210 metres to the northeast, overlooking Newcastle. It measures about 4.5 m (14 ft 9 in) high, 18 m (59 ft) from north to south, and 16 m (52 ft) from east to west. It appears to have been an Early Bronze Age multiple-cist cairn, dating to 2300–1950 BC. In the past, the cairns had a much more well-defined shape and it is thought the Great Cairn had an east-facing entrance leading to an inner chamber. They appear to parallel the two cairns on Slieve Gullion, which can be seen from Slieve Donard.

Both cairns have been badly damaged and altered over time, and modern hillwalkers often add stones on top of them. Irish folklore holds that it is bad luck to damage or disrespect such tombs and that deliberately doing so could bring a curse.

== History and folklore ==
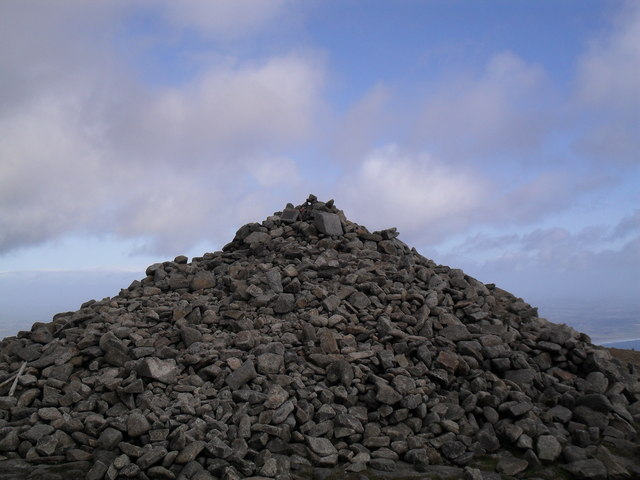
One of the summit cairns in 2009

It is likely that Slieve Donard was seen as a sacred mountain in the far past. Irish mythology identifies the Great Cairn as being the tomb or abode of mythical figures, and an entrance to the Otherworld. In Cath Maige Tuired ('The Battle of Moytura'), Slieve Donard is called one of the "twelve chief mountains" of Ireland, while in the Triads of Ireland it is called one of the "three great heights" of Ireland, along with Croagh Patrick and Great Sugar Loaf. The earliest sources give two names for the mountain: Benn mBoirchi (modern spelling: Beann Boirche) and Sliab Slánga (modern spelling: Sliabh Slángha). Beann Boirche means 'Boirche's Peak', referring to a mythical cowherd and king who had seemingly supernatural powers. The plural name Beanna Boirche ('Boirche's Peaks') was given to the Mourne Mountains. The name Sliabh Slángha means 'Slángha's Mountain'. This refers to the mythical Slángha, son of Partholón, who was said to be the first physician in Ireland. According to the Annals of the Four Masters, he died in Anno Mundi 2533 (2533 years after "the creation of the world") and was buried in the passage tomb.

Ireland was Christianized from the 5th to 8th centuries. A local Christian missionary, Saint Donard (known in Irish as Domhanghart), became associated with the mountain. According to tradition, he was a fifth-century follower of Saint Patrick and founded a monastery at Maghera, a few miles north of the mountain. Donard is said to have "appropriated the mountain and the monument for Christianity", allegedly by making the Great Cairn into a hermit's cell and using the Lesser Cairn as an oratory. According to the Life of Saint Patrick and the Tripartite Life of Saint Patrick, Patrick blessed Donard in the womb, declaring that Donard would not die but abide inside the mountain as a perpetual guardian. According to folklore, a cave runs from the seashore to the cairn on the summit, and it is here that Donard (or Boirche) lives. The writings of Gerald de Barri indicate that in the late 12th century the name Sliabh Slángha was going out of use and being replaced by Sliabh Domhanghairt. Sliabh Dónairt is the modernised spelling.

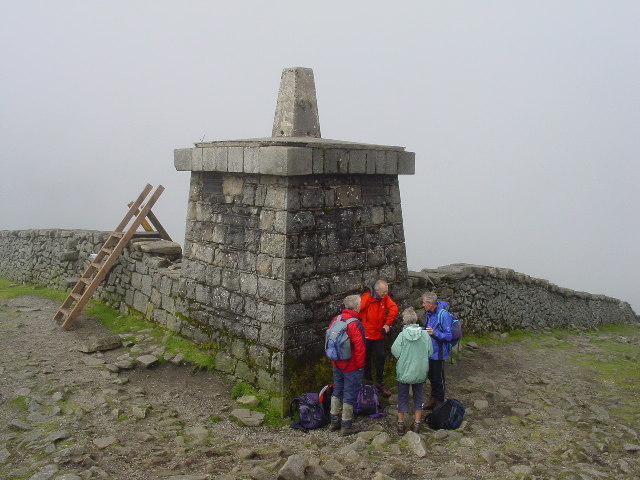
The Mourne Wall and the stone tower at the summit

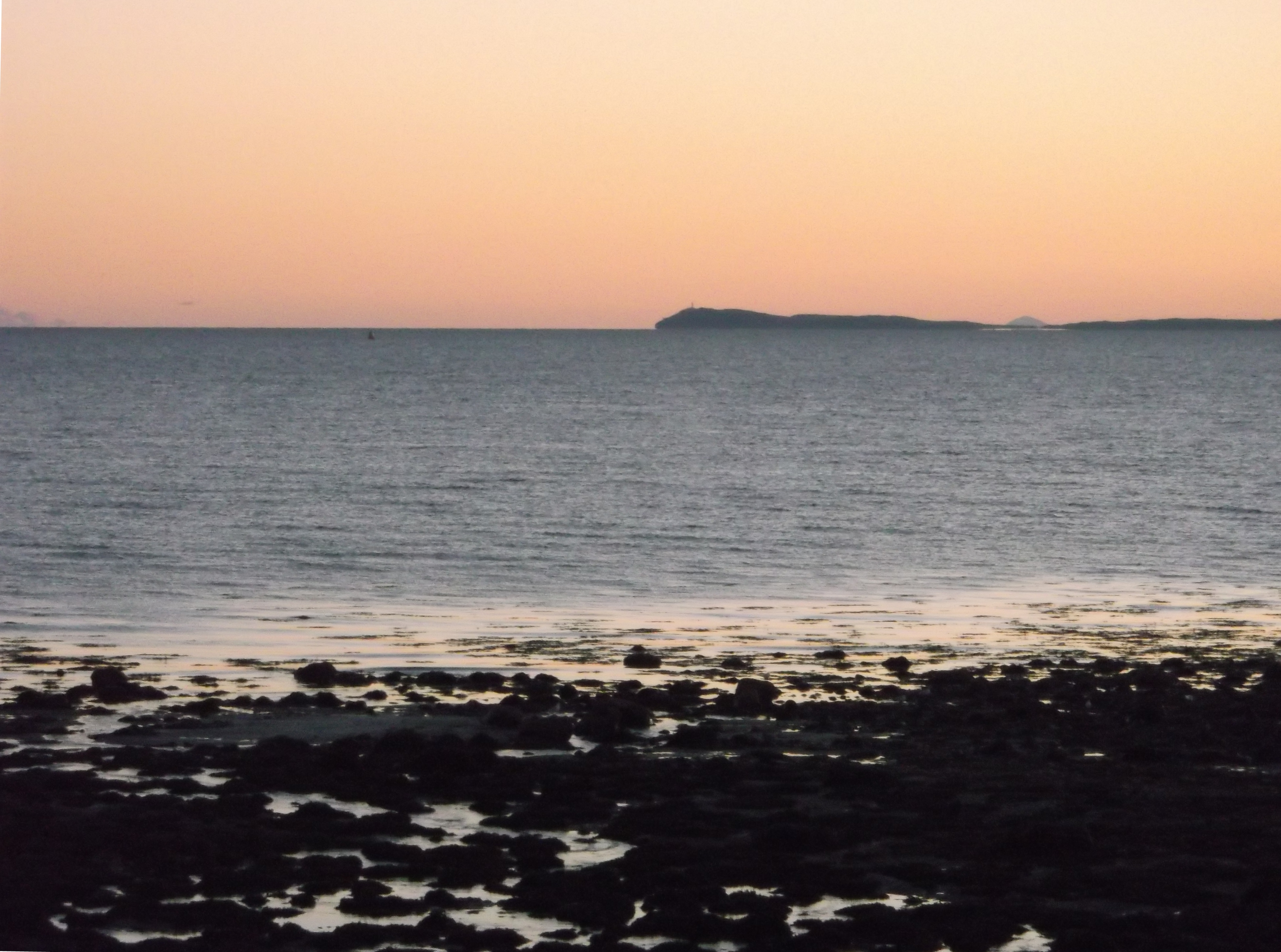
Slieve Donard seen from Port William, Scotland, across the Mull of Galloway (about 105 km)

Up until the 1830s, people made a pilgrimage to the mountaintop in late July each year. It is likely that this was originally a Lughnasadh ritual that became Christianized. The church at Maghera and St Mary's Church at Ballaghanery Upper may have been starting points for the pilgrimage.

In 1826, as part of the Principal Triangulation, the Royal Engineers used Slieve Donard as a base to map Ireland. They camped on the mountaintop from late July until late November that year and used the two cairns to make triangulation points, badly damaging the cairns. During the Survey, two men died in a snowstorm on their way down the mountain and others were hurt during storms on the summit.

The Mourne Wall was built in the early 20th century and passes over fifteen mountains, including Slieve Donard. The wall goes up the western slope to a stone tower and then down the southern slope. It took 18 years to build, from 1904 to 1922, with stonemasons working in the mountains from March to mid-October each year. Some stones from the cairns were used to build it.

In April 2006, a man was killed on Slieve Donard after being struck by lightning. A brass plaque on the summit commemorates him.

In April 2021 there was a major gorse fire on the eastern slopes of Slieve Donard, devastating the habitat and badly affecting wildlife in the area. The fire was extinguished after three days. It was thought to have been started deliberately and became the subject of a police investigation.

== See also ==
- Lists of mountains in Ireland
- List of Irish counties by highest point
- List of mountains of the British Isles by height
- List of P600 mountains in the British Isles
- List of Marilyns in the British Isles
- List of Hewitt mountains in England, Wales and Ireland
