= Donard Forest =

Forest in Northern Ireland

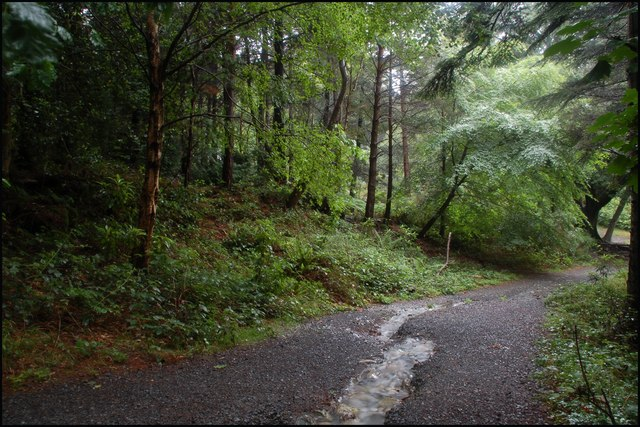
- A path within Donard Forest

- Location within Northern Ireland
- Interactive map of Donard Forest

Geography
- Location: Down, Northern Ireland, United Kingdom
- Coordinates: 54°12′11″N 5°54′07″W
- Area: 296.82 hectares (733.5 acres)

Administration
- Authority: Forest Service Northern Ireland

Donard Forest is located near Newcastle, County Down, Northern Ireland. It borders Donard Park at the foot of the Mourne Mountains. The Glen River flows through the forest where it is crossed by three stone bridges. The north east section of the forest contains a Heritage Stand of Scots and Corsican pine planted in 1927. A south east section, beside the Glen River, was the former site of Donard Lodge, built in the 1830s and later demolished. There are a number of exotic trees in the area surrounding the site of the house, including Giant Redwoods and Monkey Puzzles.

== Location ==
The forest borders Donard Park at the foot of the Mourne Mountains. The Glen River flows through the forest where it is crossed by three stone bridges. The north east section of the forest contains a Heritage Stand of Scots and Corsican pine planted in 1927. There are a number of waterfalls and cascades on the river. Access to the park is from the Donard car park in Newcastle. There are no recreational facilities in the park, and no cycling.

== History ==
A south east section, beside the Glen River, was the former site of Donard Lodge. The lodge was built in the 1830s by the Annesley family and demolished in 1966 after falling into ruin. A small brick and stone ice house near the river remains, having been used to store fish and ice for the lodge. The Annesleys planted a number of exotic trees in the area surrounding the house, including Giant Redwoods and Monkey Puzzles.

== Wildlife ==
A wide range of birds are found in the forest, and it is also home to the Holly Blue butterfly.

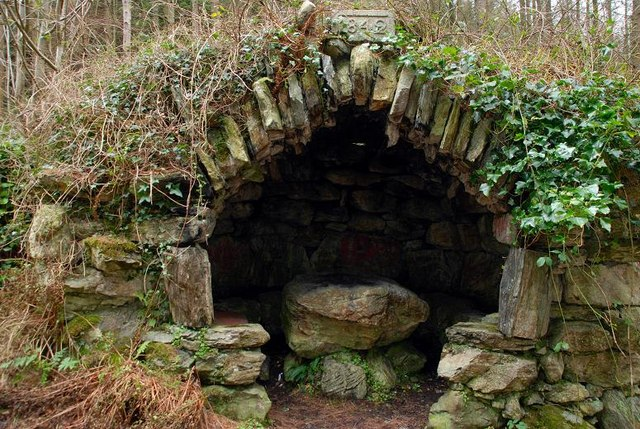
Stone Shelter within Donard Forest

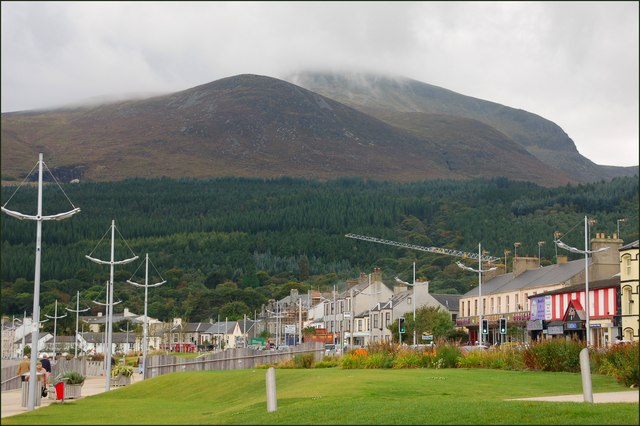
Donard Forest as seen from Newcastle Promenade
