= Millstone Mountain =

Mountain in Northern Ireland

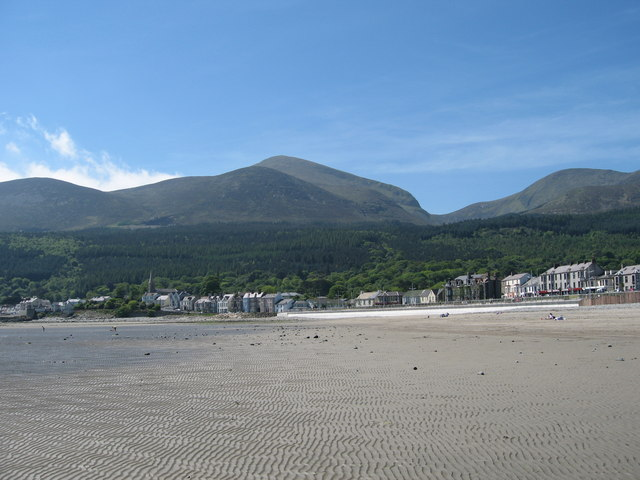
- Millstone Mountain, located on the far left

Highest point
- Elevation: 460 m (1,510 ft)
- Prominence: 25 m (82 ft)
- Coordinates: 54°11′18″N 5°53′55″W

Geography
- Location within Northern Ireland
- Location: County Down, Northern Ireland
- Parent range: Mournes
- OSI/OSNI grid: J37291 28507
- Topo map: OSNI Discoverer 29

Millstone Mountain is a hill in the Mourne Mountains in County Down, Northern Ireland. It is the most easterly peak in the Mournes and, along with Thomas Mountain and Crossone, is one of the three subsidiary peaks of Slieve Donard.

Millstone was produced in the area in the past and there are two former sites to the south-west and north-west of the summit. A granite quarry was opened on the northern side of the mountain in 1824 and a funicular railway, known as the Bogie Line, ran from it to King Street. The railway was diverted to the nearby quarry on Thomas Mountain in 1959. Both quarries are abandoned and the path of the Bogie Line is now a walking trail known as The Granite Trail.
