= Shimna River =

River in County Down, Northern Ireland

Coordinates: 54.21522°N 5.90026°W

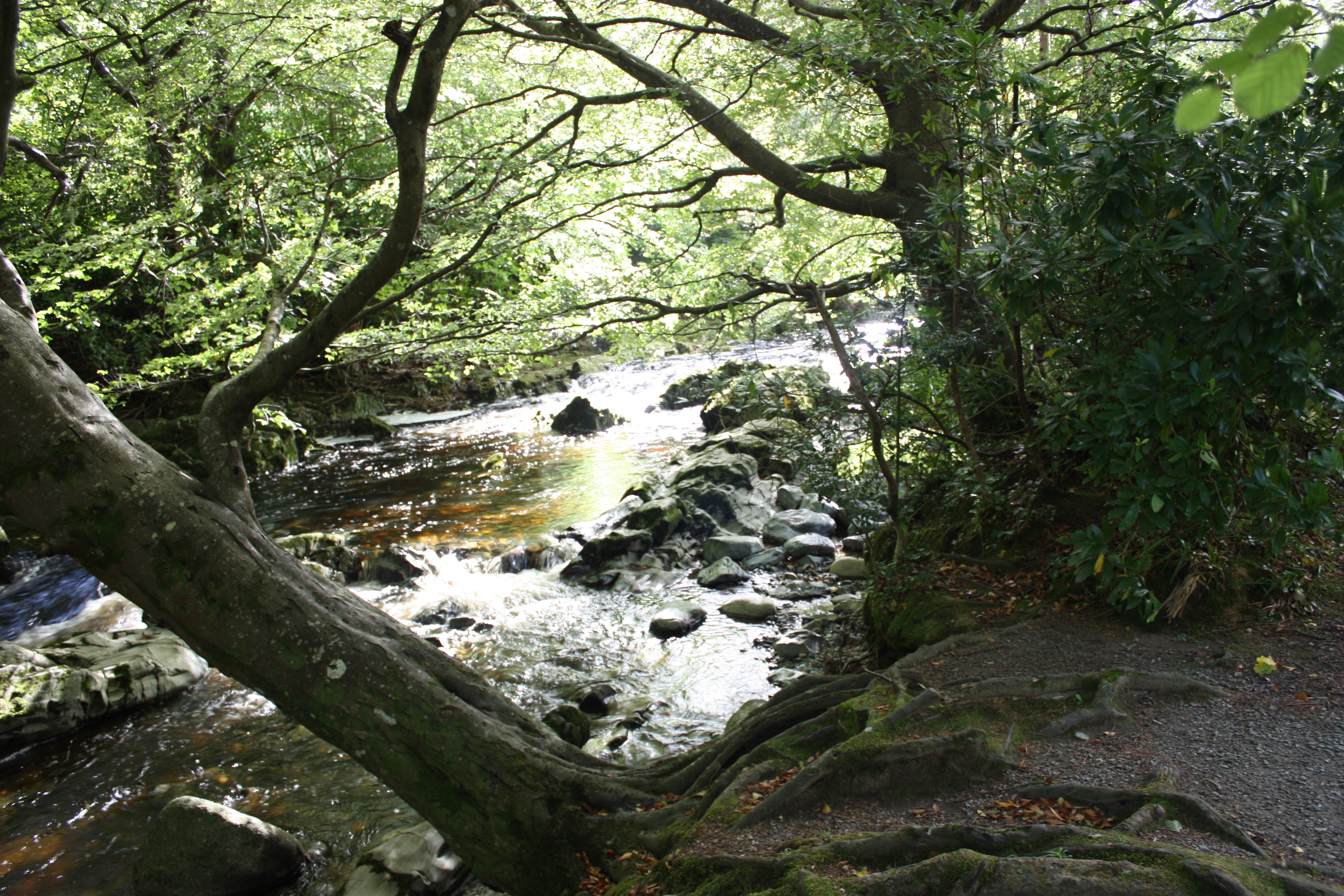
- Shimna River in Tollymore Forest Park, September 2010

- Location of mouth within Northern Ireland

Location
- Country: Northern Ireland
- Region: County Down

Physical characteristics
- Source
  - location: Mourne Mountains on the slopes of Ott Mountain
  - elevation: 430 m (1,410 ft)
- Mouth
  - location: Dundrum Bay, Irish Sea
  - elevation: 5 m (16 ft)
- Length: 11.77 km (7.31 mi)

Basin features
- Tributaries
  - left: Trassey River; Spinkwee River; Tullybrannigan River
  - right: Burren River

The Shimna River (Irish: Simhné, meaning river of bulrushes) is a river in County Down, Northern Ireland. It rises on the slopes of Ott Mountain, in the Mourne Mountains, and enters the Irish Sea at Newcastle, on Dundrum Bay. It is acidic and nutrient-poor, as a result of which its most common flora are mosses and liverworts, including the rare Portuguese feather-moss and Holt's mouse-tail moss. Its principal fish are salmon and sea trout, and it is managed by the Shimna Angling Club. The river is an Area of Special Scientific Interest (ASSI).

The Shimna has a history of flooding; the most serious recent flooding was in 2008. There have also been incidents of pollution, and there were serious fish kills in 2004, 2006 and 2009.

== Course ==
The source of the river is in the Mourne Mountains on the slopes of Ott Mountain. The river then flows in a northerly direction into Fofanny Dam. It continues its flow in a north-easterly direction into Tollymore Forest Park where the tributary Spinkwee River and Trassey River join it. The Shimna finally flows to the east, then takes a south easterly direction toward Newcastle where at one point it flows through Tipperary Wood. The final tributaries to join the river prior to it reaching the sea are the Burren River and the Tullybrannigan River, at Islands Park. Near the mouth, as it flows through Castle Park, it widens quite considerably to create a shallow boating pond.

The river's geology, flora and fauna have made it an Area of Special Scientific Interest (ASSI).

== Geology ==
The Shimna is a short spate river, meaning it becomes deep and fast-flowing after periods of rain and is slow, with low water levels in drier weather. In sections of the river where the gradient is low, there are riffles and pools, sandy banks, and pebbles and scattered boulders on the river bed. Along steeper parts there is a faster flow, rapids and cascades, and the bed is made up of bedrock and boulders.

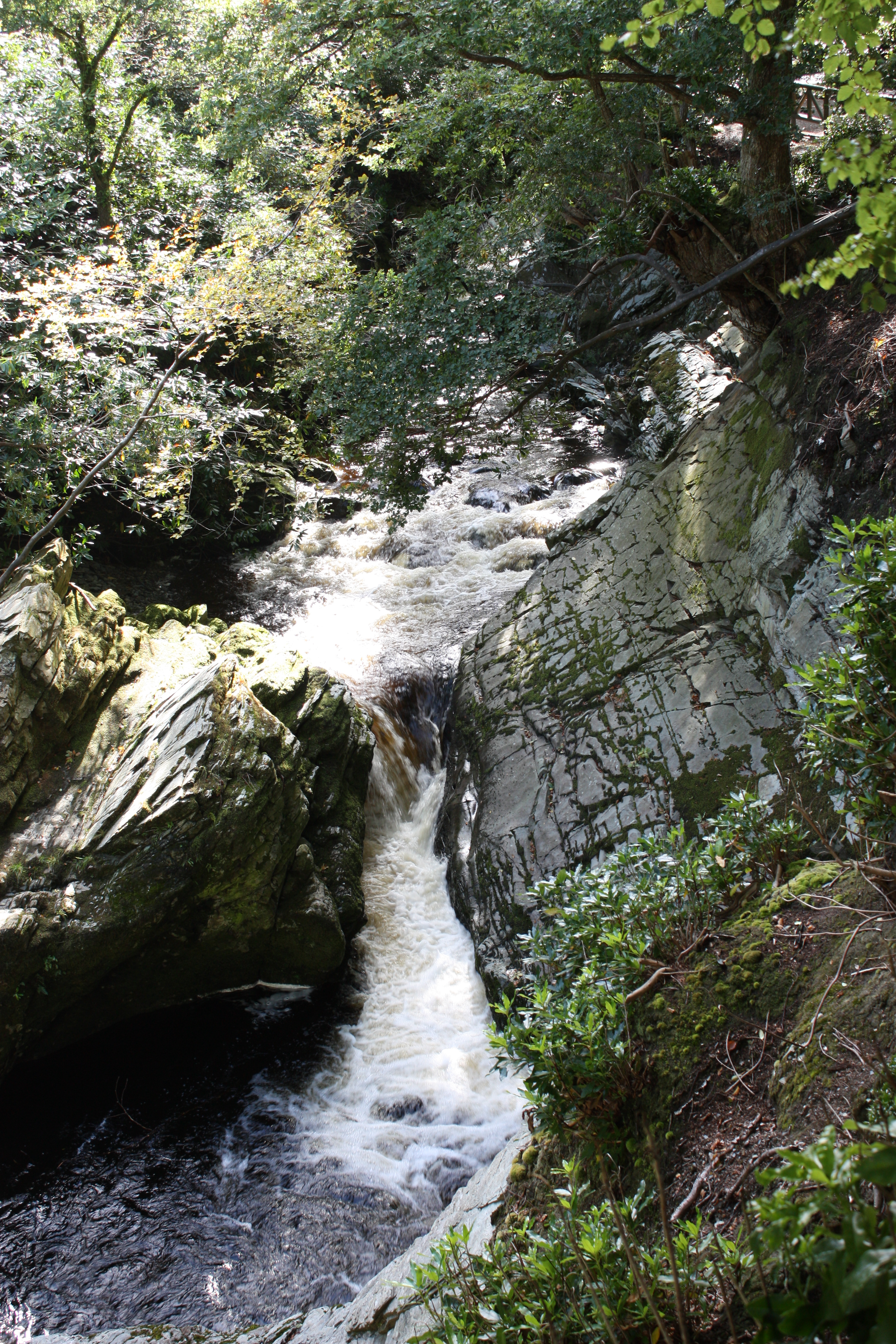
Shale rock with dark basalt bands along the edge of the river as it flows through Tollymore Forest Park

The bedrock of the upper part of the river, located in the Mourne Mountains, is composed of granite formed approximately 50 million years ago (mya). The bedrock of the river as it flows through Tollymore is shale from the Silurian age, more than 400 mya, and it forms step gorges along some sections of the river banks. Dark bands of basalt are found were molten basalt lava was forced through cracks in the bedrock about 60 million years ago. The river bed contains stones and gravel from as far away as Scotland and counties Antrim and Tyrone, which were carried there by glacial ice sheets during the last ice age.

== History ==
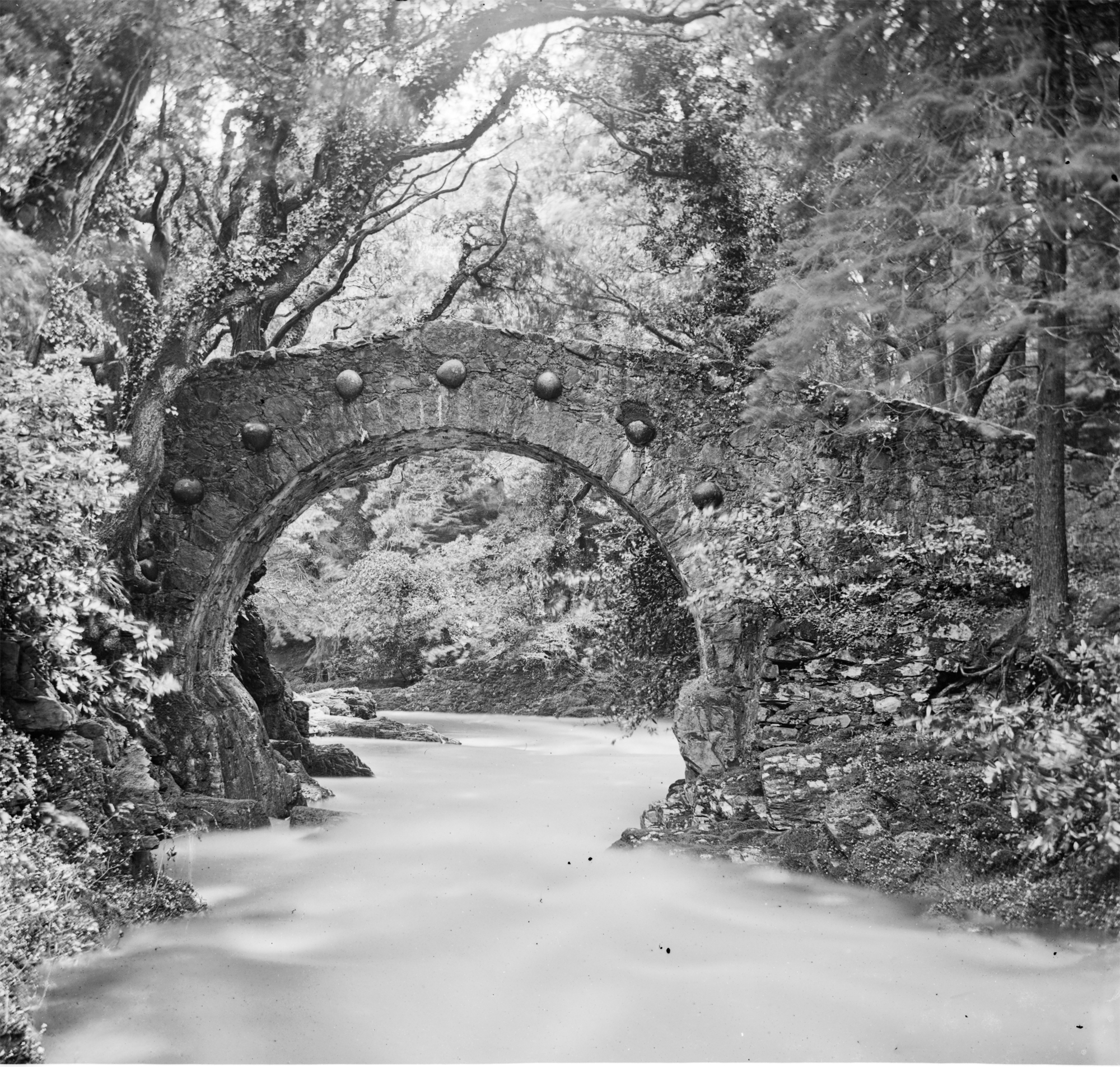
Foley's Bridge

Felix Magennis, a member of the Magennis clan and relative of Hugh Magennis, Lord of Iveagh, built a castle next to the mouth of the Shimna River in 1588. The town is referred to as New Castle in the Annals of the Four Masters in 1433 so it is likely that he built on the site of an existing structure. Magennis' castle was demolished in 1830.

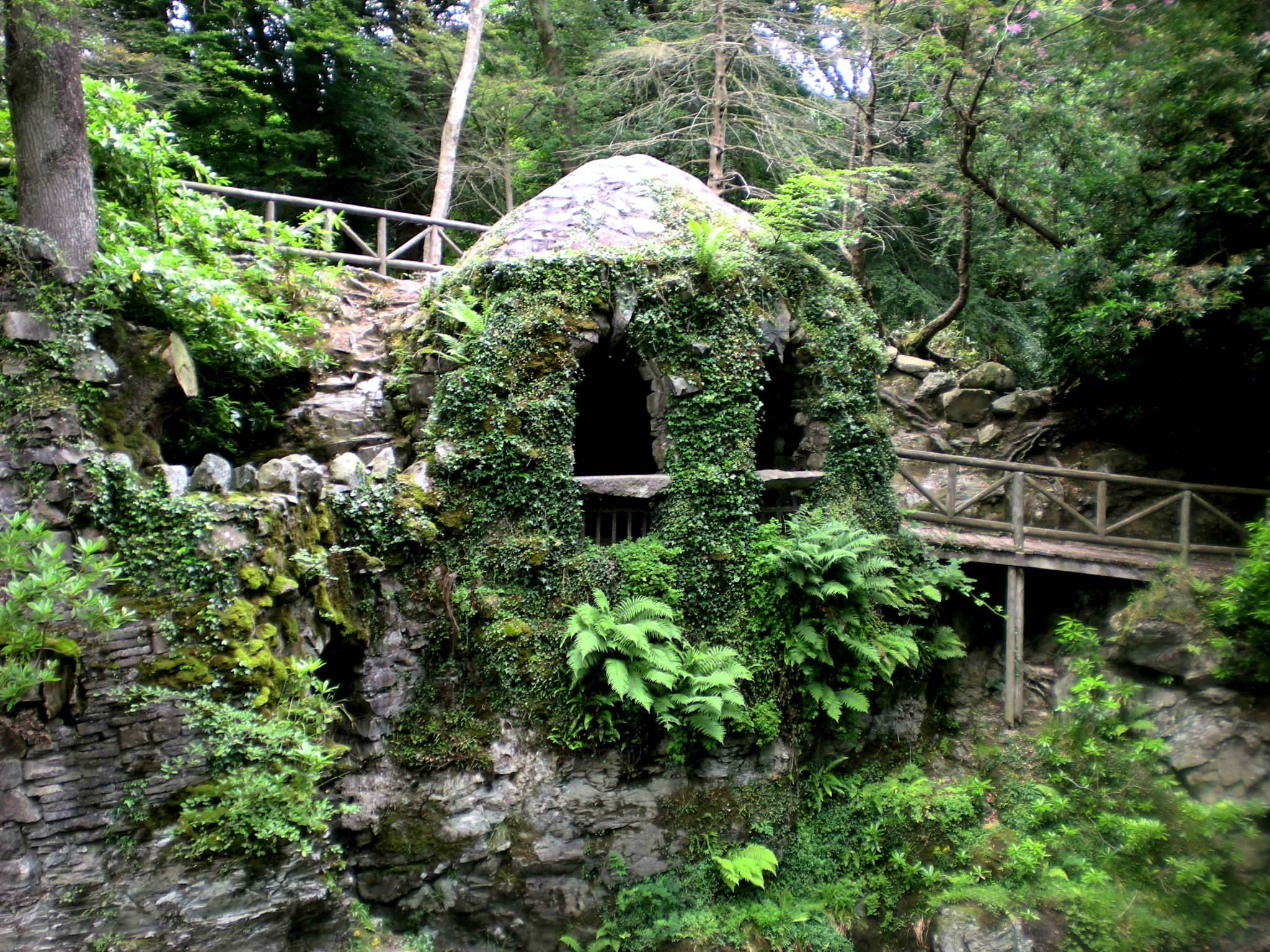
The Hermitage, Tollymore Forest Park

The river is crossed by 16 bridges as it flows through Tollymore Forest Park. The Old Bridge, built by James Hamilton in 1726, is the oldest of the current bridges. The Ivy Bridge was built in 1780 and Foley's Bridge in 1787. Parnell Bridge, named in recognition of Sir John Parnell who visited Tollymore in the late 18th century, was constructed in 1842. It was the last stone bridge to be built in Tollymore. The more recent footbridges are constructed from wood. Castle Bridge is located near the mouth where Main Street crosses the river. It was originally called Fearsat an Chaislein Nui (The Ford or Pass of the Newcastle) and was next to the entrance to the castle. This was replaced by a wider, straighter bridge in the 1890s.

The Hermitage is a small stone shelter built into the side of the gorge, above the river. It was designed by James Hamilton in the 1770s as a place for ladies to shelter while the men fished in the river.

Between 1994 and 2003, five flint artefacts were discovered near the Shimna River. A flake, two blades and a concave scraper were found in two locations in Tollymore Forest. The flake, scraper and one of the blades were identified as prehistoric. The second blade was identified as Late Mesolithic or Early Neolithic. A Bronze Age barbed and tanged arrowhead was found in a nearby field.

== Flooding ==
=== 2008 ===
There was major flooding in the area on 16 and 17 August 2008 which was investigated by the Rivers Agency, part of the Department of Agriculture and Rural Development (DARD). Most of the flooding occurred along Bryansford Avenue and the Shimna Road, close to the Burren River and Shimna River confluence, causing damage to approximately 40 properties. There is a history of flooding in Newcastle, particularly after heavy, sustained rainfall. The Rivers Agency had commissioned a flood alleviation scheme along the nearby Burren River to reduce the risk of flooding in that area to 1 in 100 in any given year (national standards). This was completed in August 2007. There are no flood prevention measures in place along the Shimna River itself but in 2014 DARD commissioned a feasibility study for flood alleviation work to be carried out. The Rivers Agency concluded that the flooding was an extreme event, caused by weather that resulted in widespread flooding across Northern Ireland. The amount of water in the rivers exceeded the capacity of the flood defences and the natural river banks. They further concluded that the flooding was a result of overflow of the Shimna River into the Burren River catchment area through Islands Park, rather than from the Burren River itself.

=== 2020 ===
Major flooding occurred on 25 and 26 August 2020 when the Shimna River burst its banks during Storm Francis. The Northern Ireland Fire and Rescue Service deployed specialist flood rescue teams, and a number of elderly people were evacuated from homes on the Shimna Road and Bryansford Road in Newcastle. In response to the flooding, Infrastructure Minister Nicola Mallon stated that work on a flood alleviation scheme for the Shimna River was due to start in the summer of 2021. She later said this will be brought forward and work on the scheme will start as quickly as possible.

There was also flooding in Tollymore Forest Park, where a number of bridges were washed away.

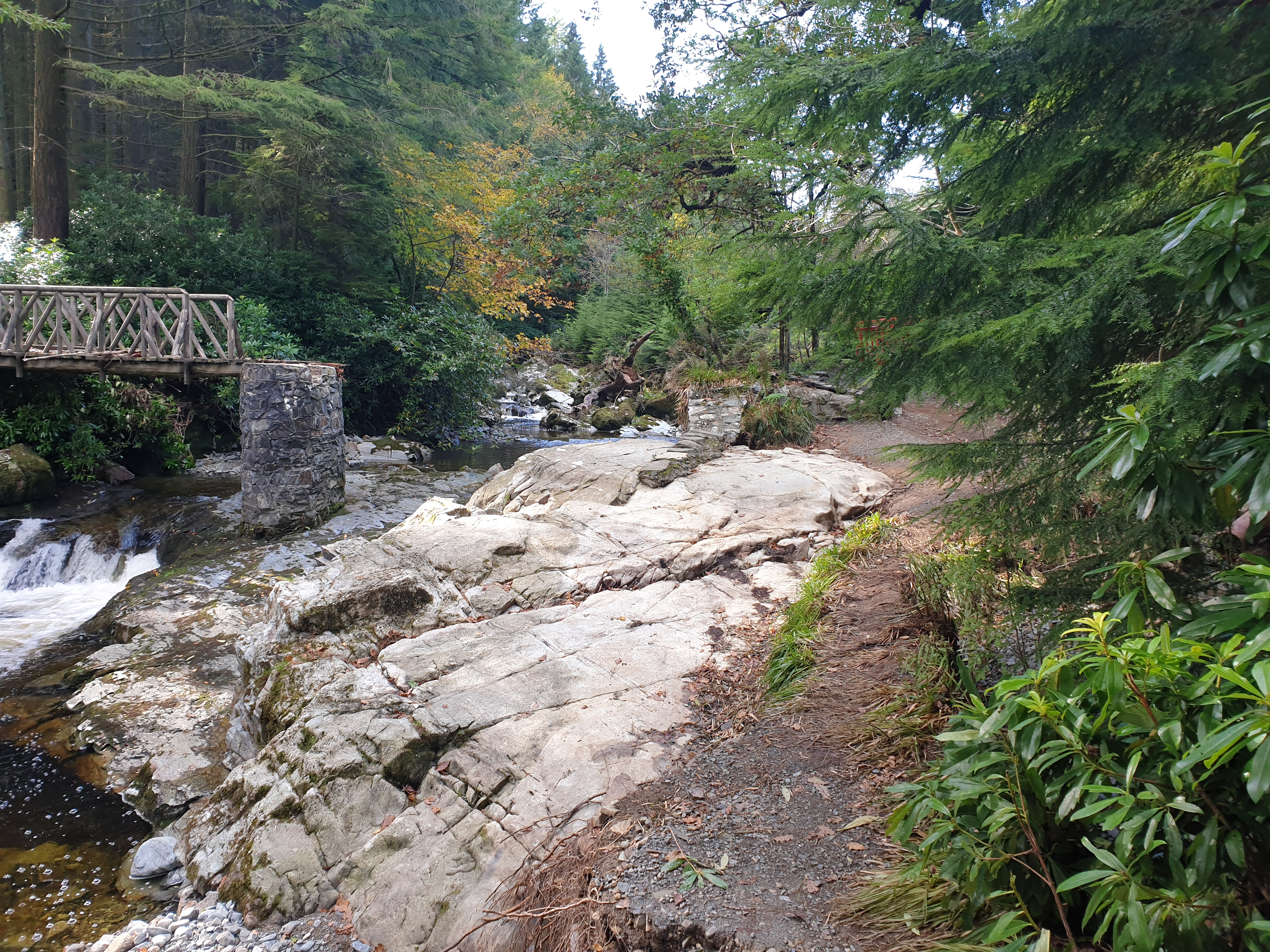
Damage to one of the wooden bridges and the path in Tollymore, caused by flooding in August 2020

== Flora ==
The river is nutrient-poor and acidic (pH 4.33) which determines the type of plant life found there. Mosses and liverworts are the most common. Near the source compressed flapwort (Nardia compressa) and green algae are the most dominant species. Closer to the mouth water earwort (Scapania undulata), feather moss and bulbous rush (Juncus bulbosus) are also found. Holt's mouse-tail moss (Isothecium holtii) is very common on the banks; the Shimna River is one of only three known sites for this species in Northern Ireland. It is also the only known location in Northern Ireland where Portuguese feather-moss (Platyhypnidium alopecuroides) is found.

Other notable species include:

- Rusty feather-moss (Brachythecium plumosum)
- Fox-tail feather-moss (Thamnobryum alopecurum)
- Yellow fringe-moss (Racomitrium aciculare)
- Overleaf pellia (Pellia epiphylla)

The most common trees found along the banks include oak, beech (Fagus sylvatica), ash (Fraxinus excelsior), birch and willow. Rhododendron, elderberry, blackberry, laurel and ivy are also common along parts of the river.

== Fauna ==
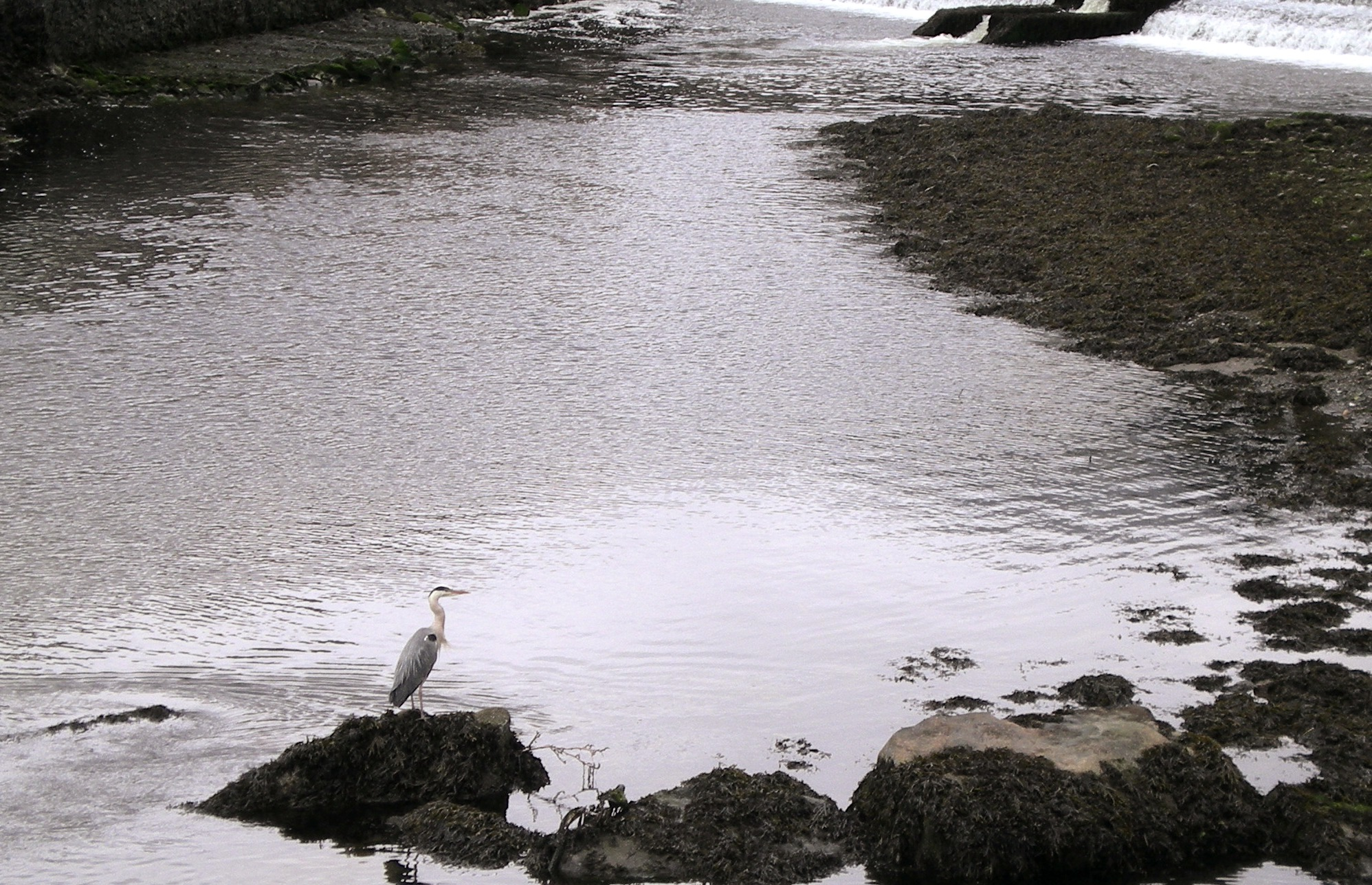
A Grey heron fishing near the mouth of the river

Atlantic salmon, brown trout and sea trout use the river to spawn. Other fish species found include Three-spined stickleback, minnow, stone loach, and eel. Dippers and Grey wagtails can also be seen feeding on insects along the river. Invertebrate species found include leeches, Simuliidae and Ancylidae. Various Mayfly families are found, such as; Baetidae, Ephemerellidae, Heptageniidae and Caenidae. Stoneflies (Nemouridae, Chloroperlidae and Perlodidae families) and caddis larvae (Hydropsychidae, Polycentropidae, Rhyacophilidae and Limnephilidae families) are also present.

A population of feral Mandarin ducks have been present on the river since 1978. Kingfishers and grey herons can also be seen. Otters are common near the mouth of the river.

== Angling ==
The river is partly owned by the Department of Culture, Arts and Leisure (DCAL) and partly leased by the Shimna Angling Club, and is managed by the latter club under a management agreement. The principal fish are salmon and sea trout. The record for the largest sea trout in Ireland was set in 1983 when a 16 lbs 6oz (7.43 kg) fish was caught in the Shimna. Fishing season is from 1 March to 31 October.

== Pollution and fish kills ==
There have been a number of incidents in recent years where the river has been polluted and fish have been killed. In 2004 a pipe was broken by builders while they were working on the upgrade of the Fofanny water treatment works, near the source of the river. This resulted in sediment running into the river and the flooding of the plant. Fish were not directly harmed by this incident, and the Water Service carried out an investigation to assure drinking water had not been affected. However, concerns were raised by the Shimna Anglers Club that this was not the first time building work had affected the river, and that there was the possibility of long term harm to the salmon and sea trout.

In July 2006, sewage discharge from a pumping station resulted in the death of an estimated 1,400 fish, mostly juveniles. Brian Finn of the Fisheries Conservation Board suggested that there may have been only a small amount of sewage released but the high water temperatures and the low water levels caused by the warm weather at the time increased the fish's vulnerability to pollution. The pollution led to the temporary closure of the boating lake and part of the beach near the mouth of the river.

In 2009 there was another major fish kill, with over 200 dead fish found near the Fofanny water treatment works. There were approximately 150 trout and 55 salmon killed. The Northern Ireland Environment Agency investigated the incident and identified a potential source. It was revealed that an emergency discharge was carried out at Fofanny Water Treatment Work from 5am to 7am, due to a generator failure. The discharge was stopped as soon as personnel arrived at the site. Northern Ireland Water claimed the discharge was necessary to maintain the drinking water supply from Fofanny Dam. Measures have been since been put in place to prevent a similar incident in the future.

In 2010 a new fish counter was commissioned for the Shimna river and the initial results indicated that fish numbers had reached approximately 76% of the conservation limit (the number of fish required to spawn) in the 2010 season. This is an improvement from the estimated 12% in 2009. However, in 2014 concerns about salmon levels in the river were raised again after it was observed that the number of eggs being laid was still below conservation limits.

== Gallery ==
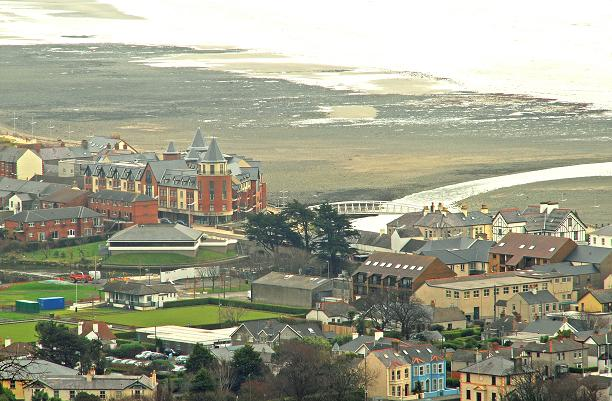
Newcastle and the Shimna River

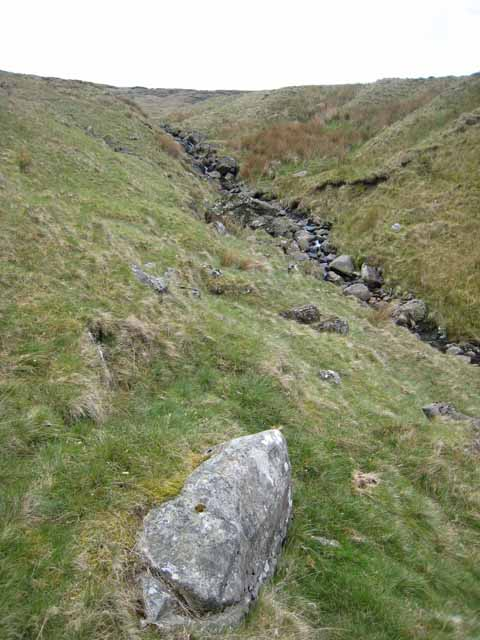
Headwater of the river

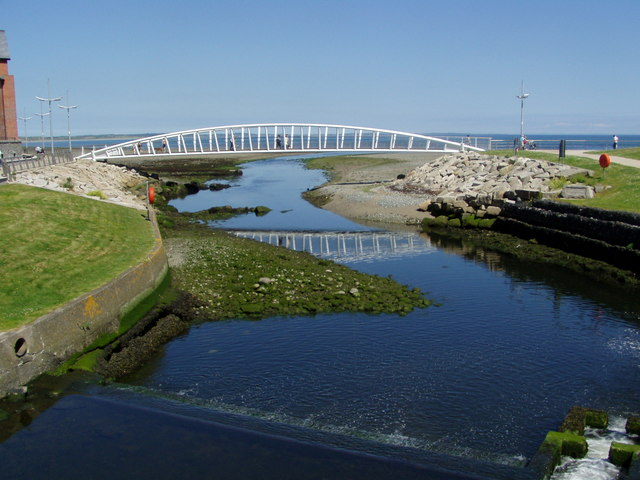
The mouth of the river
