= Maghera, County Down =

Coordinates: 54.241439°N 5.899615°W

Maghera: Irish: Machaire Rátha
- Location within County Down
- County: County Down
- Country: Northern Ireland
- Sovereign state: United Kingdom
- Police: Northern Ireland
- Fire: Northern Ireland
- Ambulance: Northern Ireland
- UK Parliament: South Down

Maghera is a civil parish in County Down, Northern Ireland. It is situated in the historic barony of Iveagh Upper, Lower Half.

The parish contains Maghera Churches and Round Tower, a 6th-century ecclesiastical site that is now a scheduled monument and monument in state care.

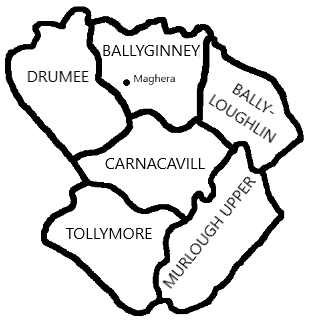
Map of the Maghera Parish

== Townlands ==
Maghera civil parish contains the following townlands:

- Ballyginny
- Ballyloughlin
- Carnacavill
- Drumee
- Murlough Upper
- Tollymore

== See also ==
- List of civil parishes of County Down
