= Ballygallum =

Townland in County Down, Northern Ireland

Coordinates: 54°17′39″N 5°41′3″W

Ballygallum: Irish: Baile Ó gColaim ‘townland of the O’Collums’
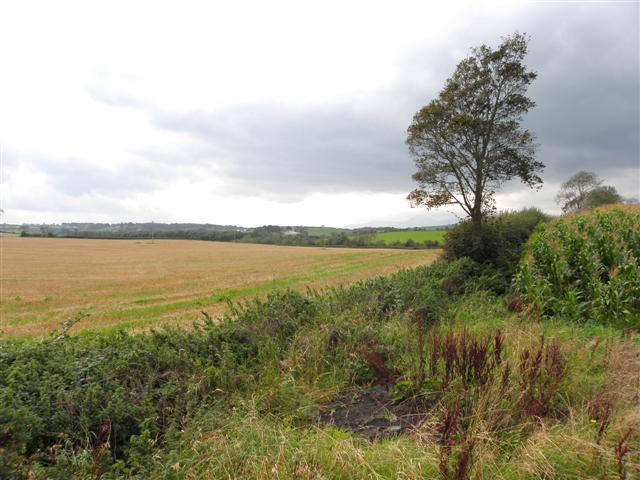
- A view across Ballygallum

- Location within Northern Ireland Location within County Down Ballygallum (County Down)
- District: Newry, Mourne and Down
- County: County Down
- Country: Northern Ireland
- Sovereign state: United Kingdom
- Post town: DOWNPATRICK
- Postcode district: BT30
- Dialling code: 028
- UK Parliament: South Down
- NI Assembly: South Down

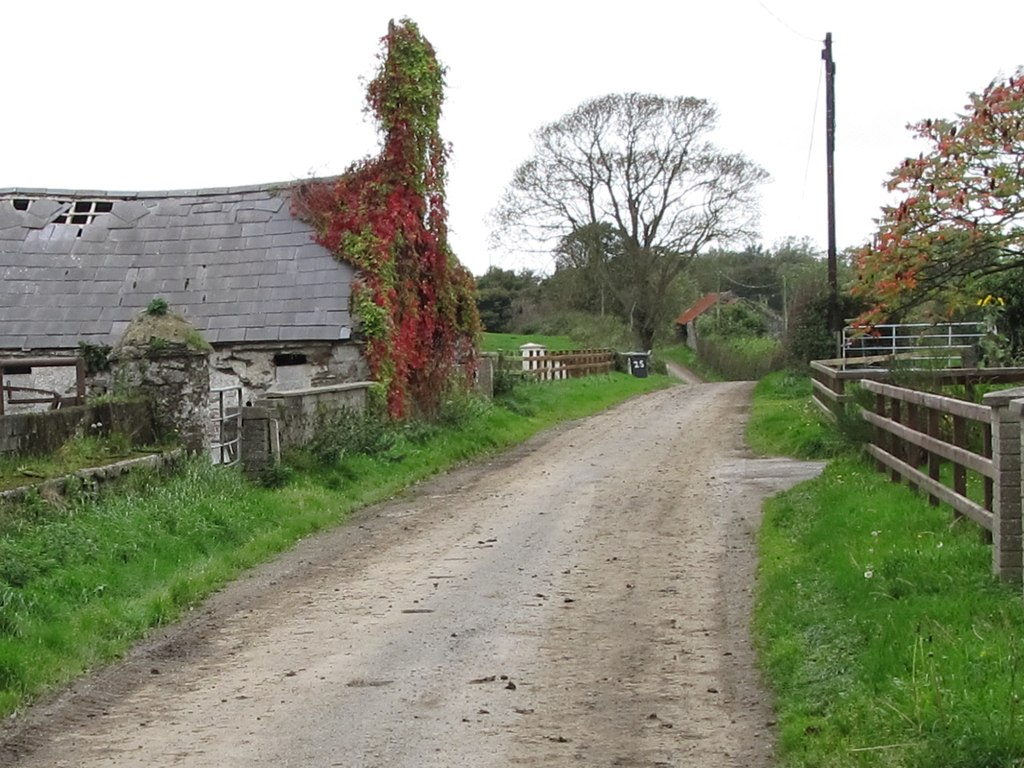
View west along Ballygallum Road

Ballygallum (Irish: Baile Ó gColaim, meaning 'townland of the O’Collums') is a townland, south of Downpatrick in County Down, Northern Ireland. The townland is approximately 0.67 km^{2} (164.82 acres) in area. It is situated in the civil parish of Bright and the historic barony of Lecale Upper.

== History ==
Ballygallum was recorded as Ballyogalme in 1549, Balliogalline in 1603, and Ballygallin alias Ballygallind in 1632. While the final element of the name might suggest a derivation from the Irish word gallán, meaning "standing stone" or "pillar stone", linguistic and historical evidence indicates that the name more likely originates from a surname. The most plausible interpretation is Baile Ó gColaim, meaning "townland of the O’Colms". The surname Ó Colaim is considered a variant of Mac Colaim (anglicised as MacCollum), which is described by Woulfe (1923, p. 335) as an Ulster surname predominantly found in the counties of Antrim, Tyrone, and Donegal.

== Geography ==
Townlands that border Ballygallum include:

- Ballyclander Lower to the east
- Ballyclander Upper to the east
- Ballymote Lower to the west
- Ballywarren to the north
- Coniamstown to the south
- Grangewalls to the south
- Grangicam to the west
