= Erenagh, County Down =

Townland in County Down, Northern Ireland

Coordinates: 54°17′40″N 5°44′20″W

Erenagh: Irish: An Oireanach ‘the cultivated place’
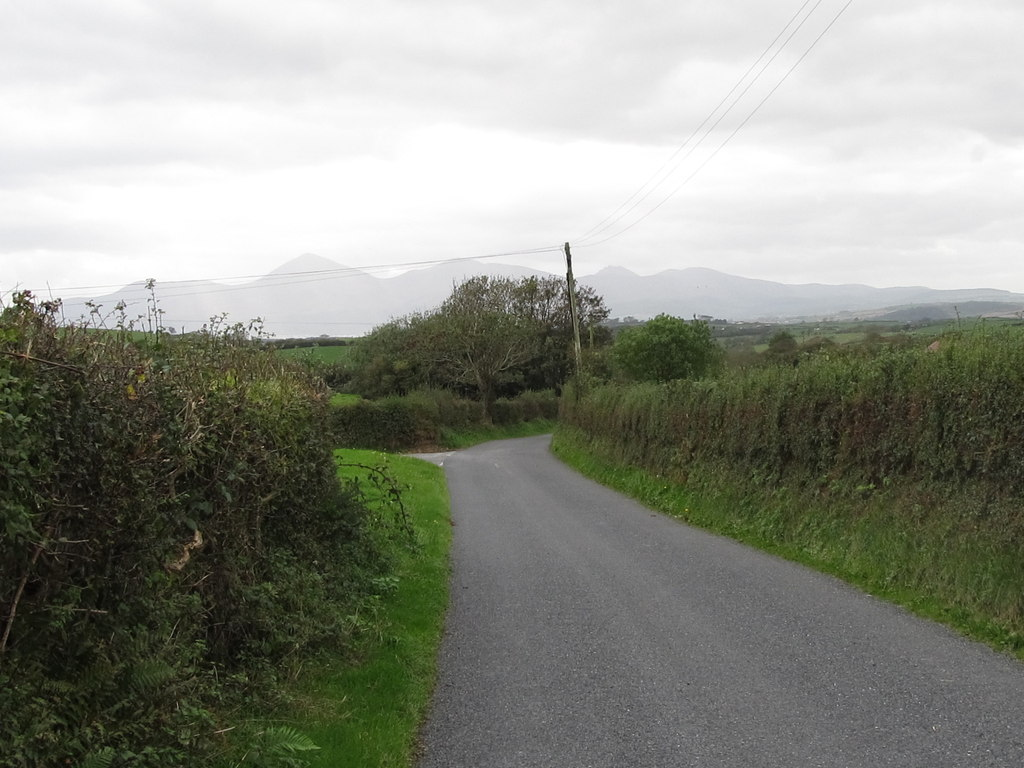
- View west along Erenagh Road with The Mournes in the background

- Location within Northern Ireland Location within County Down Erenagh (County Down)
- Irish grid reference: J496438
- District: Newry, Mourne and Down
- County: County Down
- Country: Northern Ireland
- Sovereign state: United Kingdom
- Post town: DOWNPATRICK
- Postcode district: BT30
- Dialling code: 028
- UK Parliament: South Down
- NI Assembly: South Down

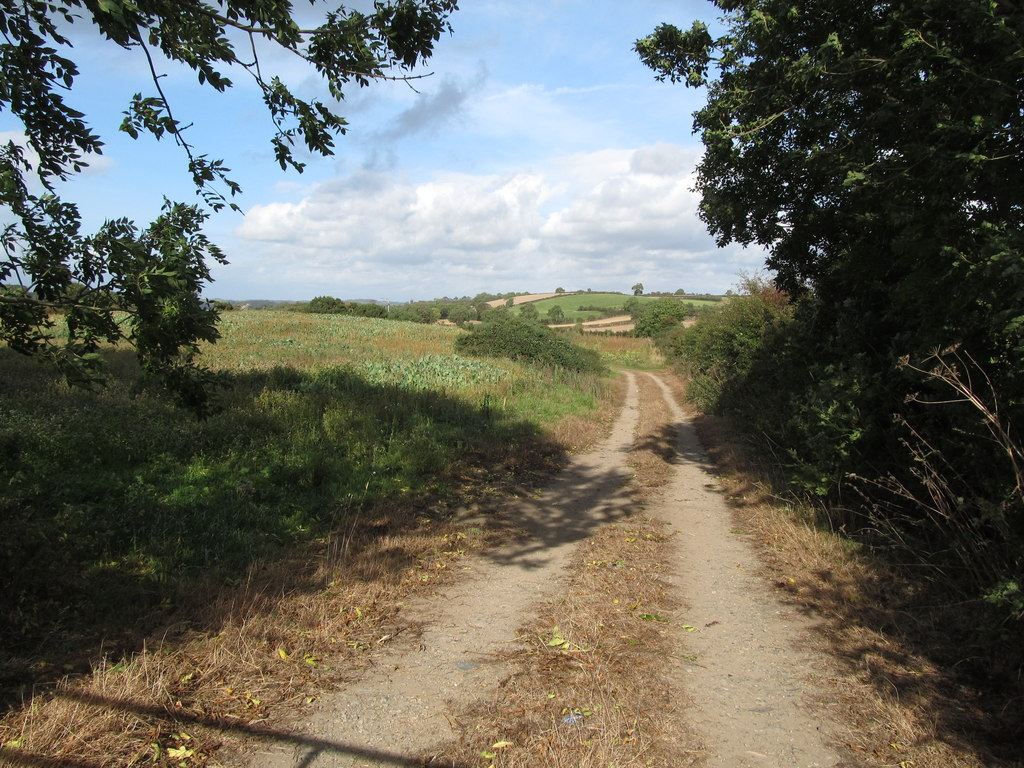
Field access lane on the Erenagh Road

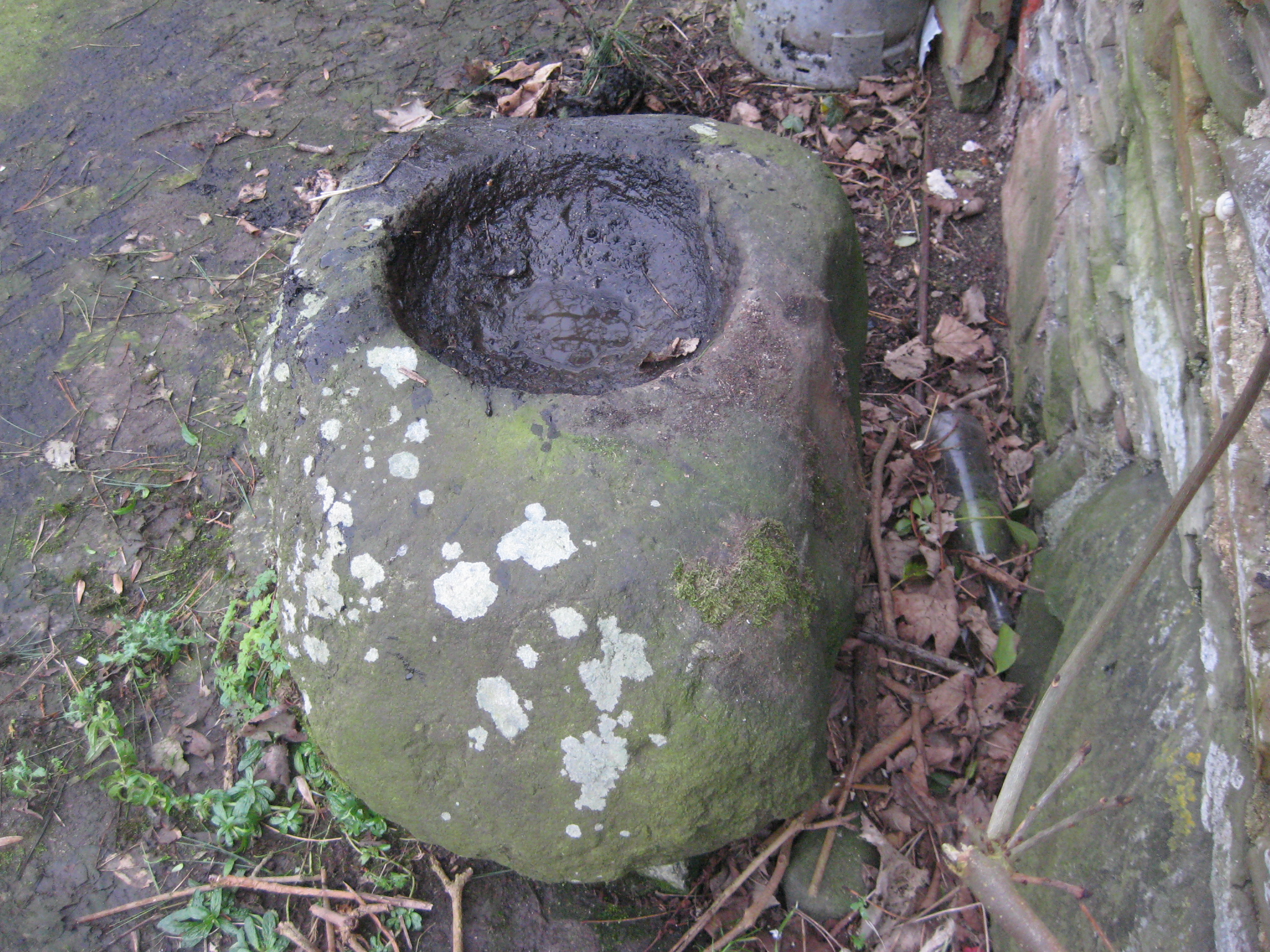
Original font associated with Carryke Abbey, now located in Castlescreen

Erenagh (Irish: An Oireanach, meaning 'the cultivated place') is a townland, south of Downpatrick in County Down, Northern Ireland. The townland is approximately 1.6 km^{2} (386.14 acres) in area. It is situated in the civil parish of Bright and the historic barony of Lecale Upper.

== History ==
The townland of Erenagh is mentioned in a medieval record associated with Furness Abbey in Lancashire, England. According to the Monasticon Anglicanum, a historical compilation of monastic records, a figure identified as "Magnellus Makenlefe," described as a king of Ulster, is said to have founded an abbey in the area in 1127. This abbey was established near a site known as St. Finian’s Well, in a location referred to as "Erynach" (now Erenagh) and was named Abbey of Carryke. This foundation is notable as an early example of an English monastic institution establishing a presence in Ireland before the arrival of John de Courcy and his forces in Ulster in 1177. No physical remains of the abbey are known to survive, although St. Finian’s Well still exists near the southern boundary of the townland.

Erenagh Abbey, also known as Carrig, was founded in 1127 and holds the distinction of being the first abbey of a recognized religious order established in Ireland after the Synod of Ráth Breasail in 1111. It was located within the Diocese of Down, placing it under the ecclesiastical authority of St. Malachy. Historical accounts suggest that Malachy visited the Savigniac community at Tulketh (prior to its relocation to Furness) around 1126–1127, where he likely arranged for the establishment of a daughter house in Ireland. Upon returning, he secured the support of a local king to found the abbey, and a colony of monks arrived that same year—though it remains uncertain whether they came directly from Savigniac or via Tulketh.

Traditionally, the founder has been identified as Niall Mac Dunlevi, King of Ulster, who died in battle in 1127. However, there is some scholarly debate regarding the true identity of the figure referred to in some sources as Magnellus Makenlefe. Many historians believe this name is a Latinized or corrupted form of Niall MacDunlevy, ruler of the Dál Fiatach, one of the three principal tribes of Ulaidh, whose capital was at Dún Dá Lethglas (modern-day Downpatrick). Others argue that Magnellus Makenlefe may in fact refer to McNoellus Makenlef, possibly Niall’s son, who also held kingship in Ulster and is credited with founding a monastery of the Canons Regular of St. Augustine at Lisgoole, County Fermanagh, around 1145.

The name McNoellus could be a derivative of MacNiall or MacNeill (meaning “son of Niall”), while Makenlefe may stem from MacAmleave, itself a variation of MacDunlevy. This linguistic ambiguity has contributed to the ongoing debate over which member of the dynasty was the true founder of Erenagh Abbey.

In 1147 the order of Savigny was united with the Cistercian Order, and the community at Erenagh joined the Cistercian Order as a daughter house of Furness. When Evodius, the first abbot of Erenagh, was dying, he asked the brethren to bury him at Inch Abbey, foretelling that his abbey would be there after Erenagh had been destroyed. His predictions were correct: in 1177 the abbey was destroyed by John de Courcy on the grounds that it was fortified against him. In the 1180s Courcy rebuilt a monastery at Inch, which appears to have been among the endowments of Erenagh Abbey, as a way of making amends for his actions.

Locally, the abbey was referred to as Templenageerah, derived from the Irish Teampall na gCaorach, meaning "church of the sheep." Historical records show variations of the townland’s name, including "Narrenagh" in 1603 and "Narenagh alias Erinagh" in 1662. The most widely accepted interpretation of the name is An Oireanach, meaning "the cultivated place."

In April 2025, archaeologists from the Community Archaeology Programme Northern Ireland (CAPNI), alongside local volunteers and students, announced they were confident they had located the site during a two-week excavation that uncovered sections of wall, pottery, animal bones, slate roof tiles, cut stones with mason marks, and a coin from the reign of Henry III of England (circa 1270). The site, situated near the Ballynoe Stone Circle, had previously shown anomalies in a geophysical survey, prompting the dig. According to Brian Sloan of Queen's University Belfast, the monastery is significant for its early adoption of European cloister-style architecture, contrasting with traditional Irish monastic designs. Radiocarbon dating and further analysis are expected to confirm the site's identity as the long-lost Erenagh Monastery.

== Places of interest ==
=== St. Finian’s Well ===
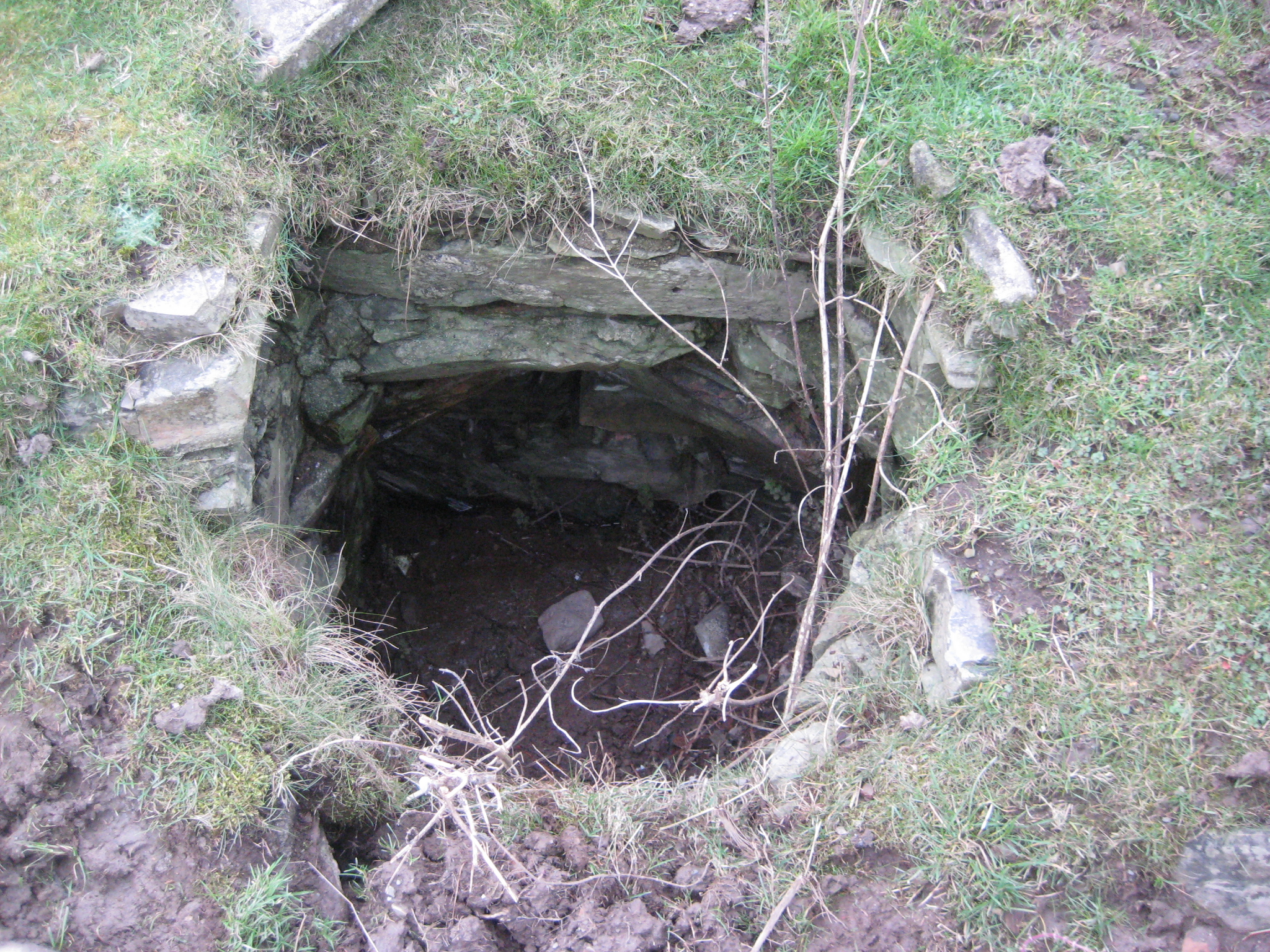
St Finnan's Well, Erenagh townland

A natural spring located approximately 350 yards northwest of the site of the medieval Abbey of Carryke. The well is formed by a natural hollow in the bedrock and is faced with stone masonry.

Local tradition holds that the well bears the imprint of Saint Finian’s knees and feet on a stone slab, suggesting a long-standing spiritual significance. Although the exact reason for its association with the 6th-century saint is unclear, historian Hamlin believes this may indicate the presence of an earlier monastic settlement at Erenagh, predating the foundation of Carryke Abbey in 1127.

The well would have served as a reliable water source for the abbey and its inhabitants, alongside a nearby stream that was likely diverted for monastic use. Its location near medieval harbours such as Strangford Lough and Dundrum Bay, and close to the main route between Dundrum and Downpatrick, suggests it may have also been a stop for pilgrims traveling to important religious sites like Saul and Downpatrick.

== Geography ==
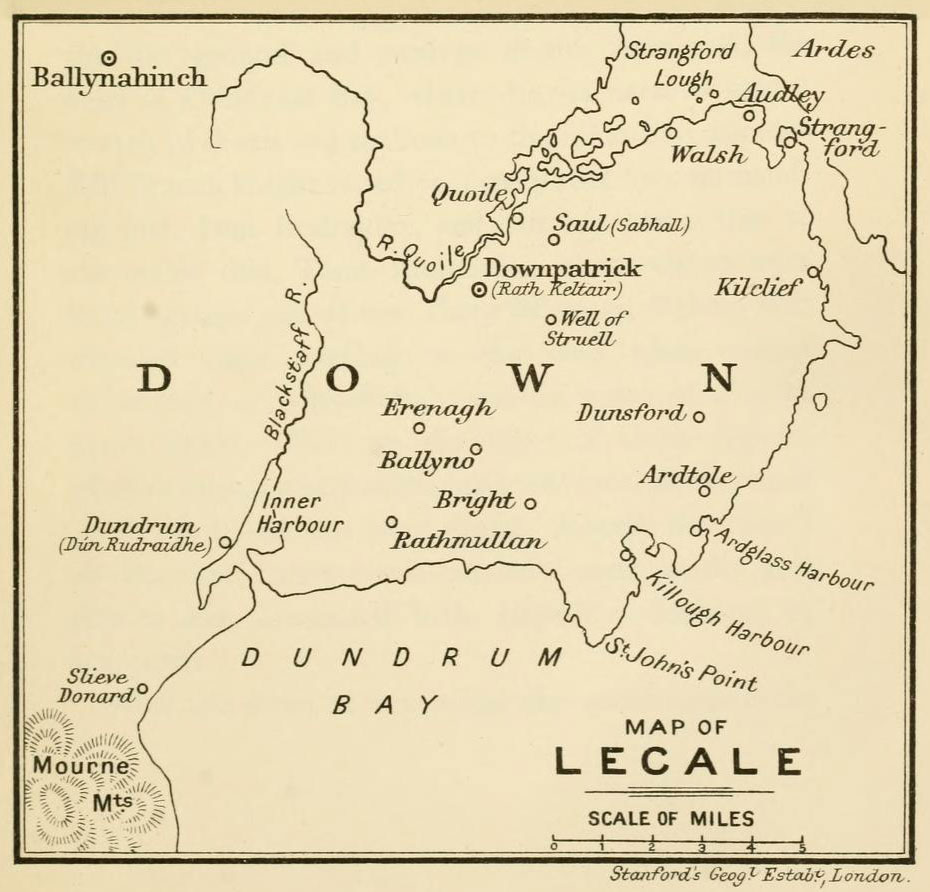
Erenagh (1912)

Townlands that border Erenagh include:

- Ballykilbeg to the west
- Ballynoe to the east
- Bonecastle to the west
- Castleskreen to the west
- Corbally to the west
- Grangicam to the east
- Islandbane to the east
- Marshallstown to the east
- Quarter Cormick to the north
