= Bright GFC =

Gaelic Football club

- Breachtain
- Founded: 1951
- County: Down
- Colours: Green and Gold
- Grounds: Ballynoe Road, Downpatrick, BT30 8AJ
- Coordinates: 54.2945°N 5.7154°W

Playing kits
Home Kit

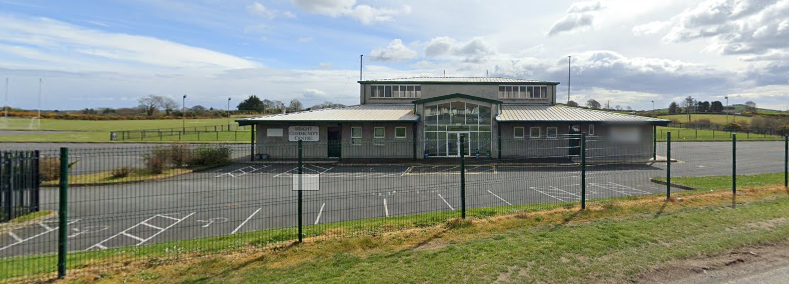
The Bright GFC football pitch and clubhouse, shared with the local community centre, is in Marshallstown townland

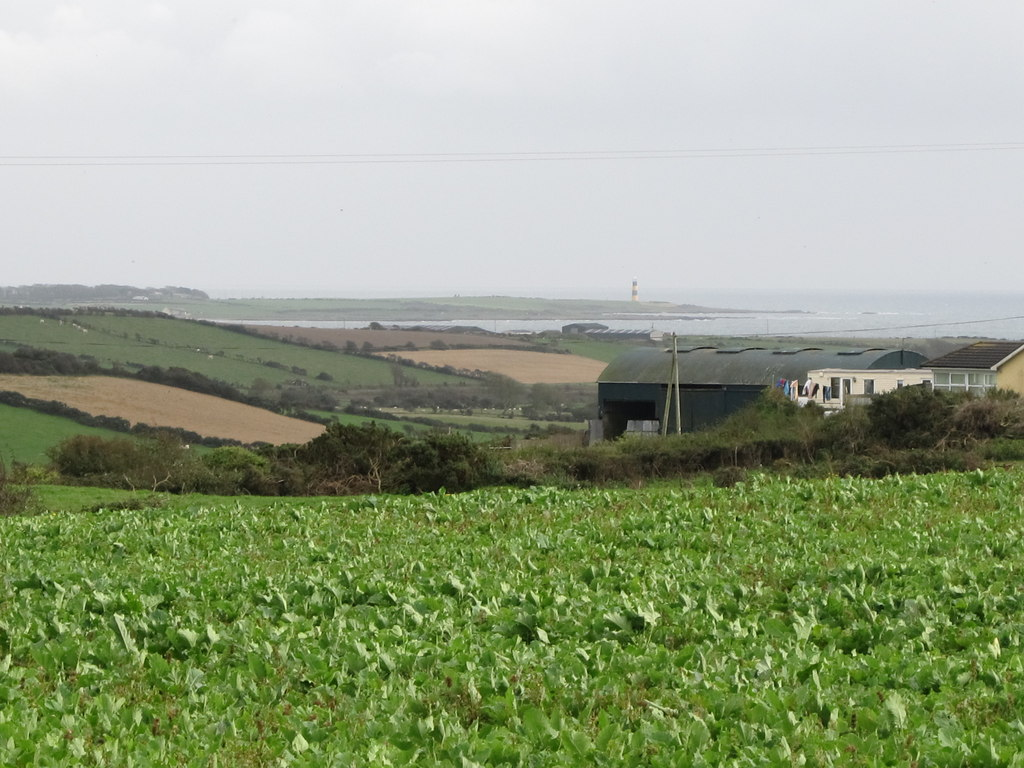
Location of Scollockstown Gaelic football pitch in the 1950s on farmland south of Corbally Road

Bright Gaelic Football Club (GFC) is a Gaelic athletic club (GAC), affiliated with the Gaelic Athletic Association (GAA), in the parish of Bright in County Down, Northern Ireland. It organises activities in several Gaelic games, including Gaelic football, hurling, and camogie.

== History ==
Gaelic football had been played in the parish since the late 1800s. The Gaelic Athletic Association (GAA) had taken longer to get going in Ulster than in other parts of Ireland, and it wasn't until 1951 that Bright GFC was established.

Initially, the club operated under the name "Scollogstown" (or "Scollockstown"), using local farmland in that locale for matches due to the lack of dedicated sports facilities. The club, which changed its name several times over the years, ultimately adopted the parish name of Breachtain (Bright).

A senior team was formed following a friendly match arranged to generate interest, and a focus on youth development led to the creation of the East Down Schoolboys League. The club's first competitive match was played against Castlewellan in a flooded pitch. The youth team later progressed to win the Down County Minor Championship in 1956.

As of the turn of the 21st century, Bright GFC was fielding teams at various age levels, including under-14 and under-16, as well as senior and reserve teams. The club won the Down Junior Football Championship title in 2019.

== Facilities ==
While the club initially played matches in various locations, including in Ballynewport, Legamaddy, Grangecam, Oakley and Rossglass depending on field availability, the club's main grounds are located on Ballynoe Road in Marshallstown, near Carney Hill. The club's clubhouse doubles as the local community centre.

In April 2019, the club introduced a new set of dugouts at the pitch. This improvement was funded through a combination of national funding allocated to GAA clubs and contributions from the local community. A new away kit was sponsored and presented to club officials prior to the first home game of the season in 2016 against Ardglass.

== See also ==
- List of Gaelic games clubs in County Down, Ireland
- Down GAA#Clubs
