= Ballylucas =

Townland in County Down, Northern Ireland

Coordinates: 54°16′25″N 5°44′6″W

Ballylucas: Irish: Baile Lúcáis
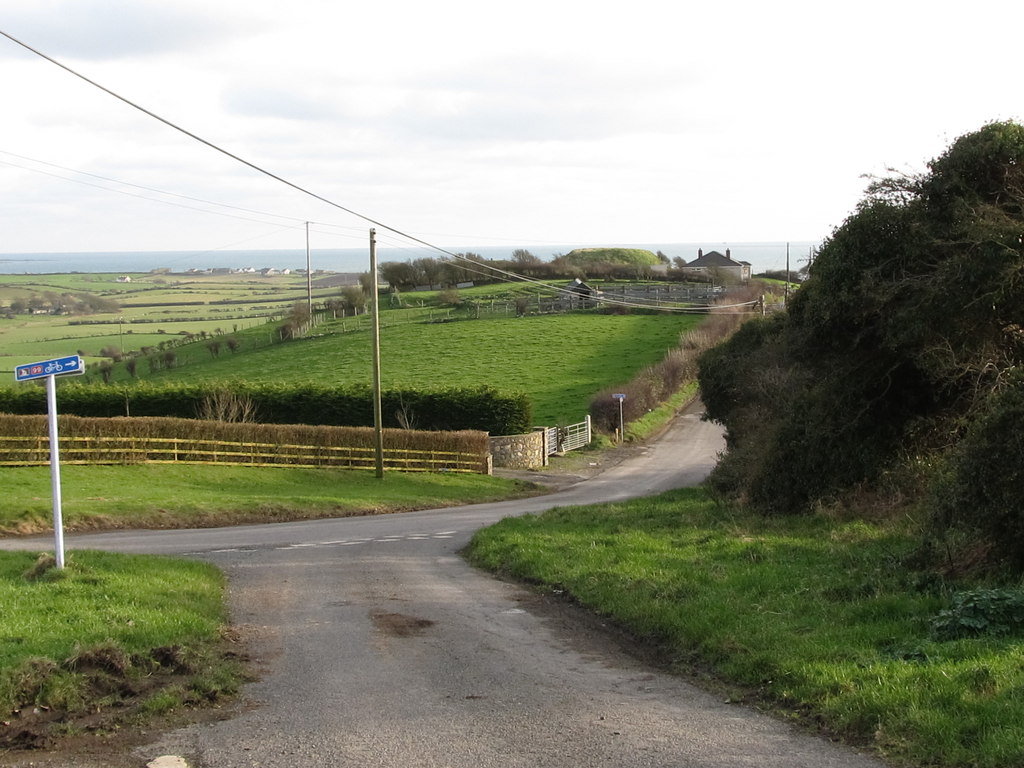
- The junction of Scollogs Hill Road at the Ballylucas Road near Rathmullan Church

- Location within County Down
- County: County Down
- Country: Northern Ireland
- Sovereign state: United Kingdom

Ballylucas is a townland five kilometres south of Downpatrick, County Down, Northern Ireland. It is 1.22 km^{2} (302.28 acres) in area. Ballylucas is located in the Electoral Division of Tyrella, within the Civil Parish of Rathmullan, in the barony of Lecale Upper, County Down. The Irish name for Ballylucas is Baile Lúcáis.

== History ==
The townland of Ballylucas was recorded as Lucaston in 1518 and later as Ballylucas around 1659. This suggests that the name was originally coined in English, likely during the Norman period, and was later Gaelicised to Baile Lúcáis. The English surname Lucas is an older form of Luke, now common in all provinces except Connacht. This name has been recorded in Ireland since the fourteenth century and is sometimes found as an abbreviated form of the Scottish surname Mac Lucas.

It was part of Charles Russell's estate in 1650; proprietor Mr Hamilton- authority Bernard Marmion in 1836

=== Scollockstown dance hall ===
In 1931, residents of Ballylucas, Rathmullan Upper, and Scollockstown (or "Scollogstown") decided to improve local recreation facilities by purchasing a surplus army hut from Ballykinlar Camp to use as a dance hall. A local shopkeeper and farmer, bought the hut, transported it in sections by tractor, and assembled it on his land near Ballylucas Road, located about 100 yards from a local quarry called the “White Rock”. It was formally named “Whiterock Hall” but the locals called it Scollockstown hall.

The final dance at the hall was held in September 1950, with a few smaller events advertised later that year. By mid-1951, public functions had ceased, and the hall was dismantled, with its materials repurposed for farm use. Larger dance halls like Ballynoe Hall were becoming more popular due to the rise of showbands and growing audience sizes, marking the decline of smaller local halls.

== Archaeology ==
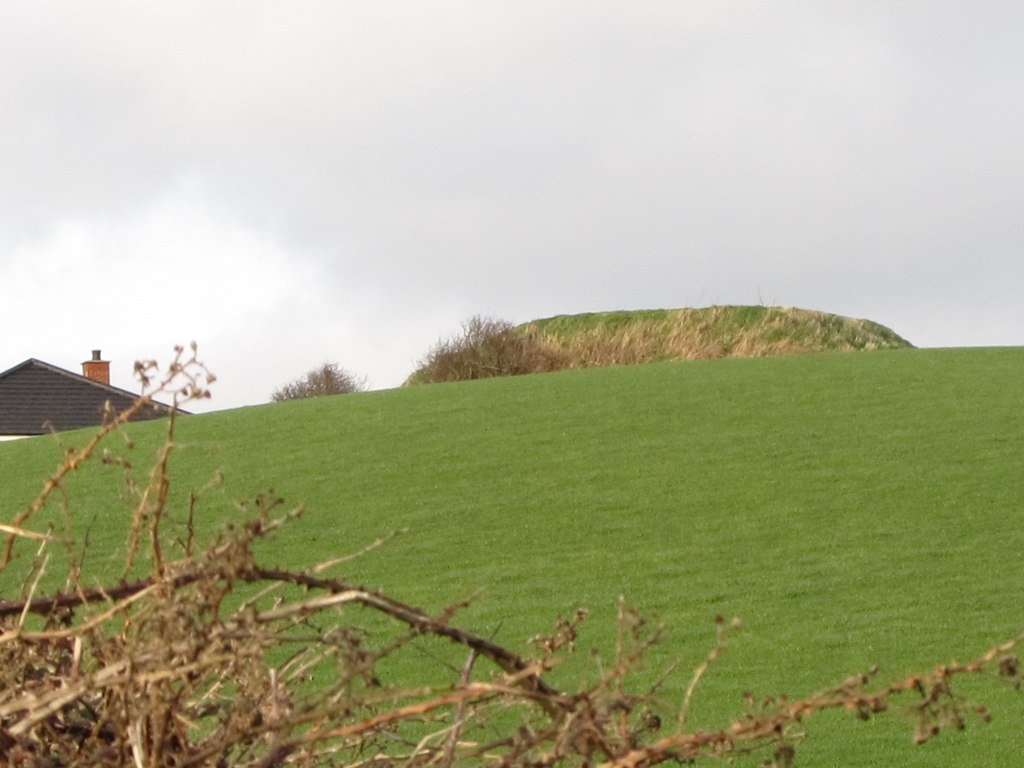
Motte on the Ballylucas Road

An Anglo-Norman motte (mound) in Ballylucas is thought to be the remnants of an ancient ráth. Archaeological finds at this location include English-made pottery from the 13th century. Only traces of the fort remain with no definable features. The site is on land that slopes to the southeast and has several rock outcrops. It was marked as a "Fort" on an 1834 map and shown as a small, undesignated fort on a later edition. It doesn't appear on more recent maps. The mound is a steep rock outcrop, 3.5 meters high on the north side and 7 meters high on the south side. A narrow path leads to the oval-shaped summit, which measures 18 meters north-south and 13 meters east-west. The surface slopes down to the east, where it is 0.7 meters lower than the west perimeter. There is a broken bank, 2 meters wide and about 0.6 meters high, on the north side. A steep ditch, 2 meters wide and about 1.5 meters below the summit, is on the east side.

== Geography ==
Townlands that border Ballylucas include:

- Ballydargan to the east
- Ballynewport to the north
- Ballyplunt to the west
- Legamaddy to the east
- Rathmullan Upper to the south
