= Blackwood Price =

Irish Anglican cleric

(Townley) Blackwood Price(1815–1902) was Archdeacon of Down from 1889 until 1899.

Price was born in County Down, educated at Trinity College, Dublin and ordained in 1839. After a curacy at Smithfield and Shankhill he held incumbencies in Newtownards, Bright, County Down and Downpatrick.
