= Castleskreen =

Townland in County Down, Northern Ireland

Coordinates: 54°17′17″N 5°44′58″W

Castleskreen: Irish: Caisteal Críon ‘old or decayed castle’
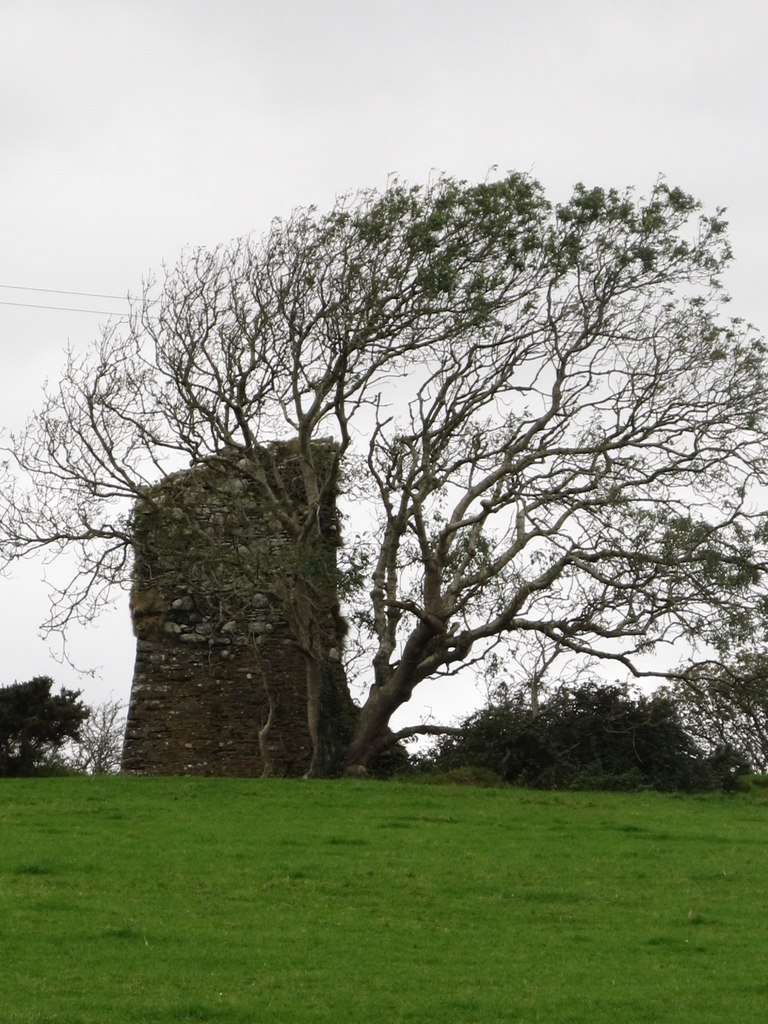
- The ruins of Castle Skreen

- Location within Northern Ireland Location within County Down Castleskreen (County Down)
- Irish grid reference: J496438
- District: Newry, Mourne and Down
- County: County Down
- Country: Northern Ireland
- Sovereign state: United Kingdom
- Post town: DOWNPATRICK
- Postcode district: BT30
- Dialling code: 028
- UK Parliament: South Down
- NI Assembly: South Down

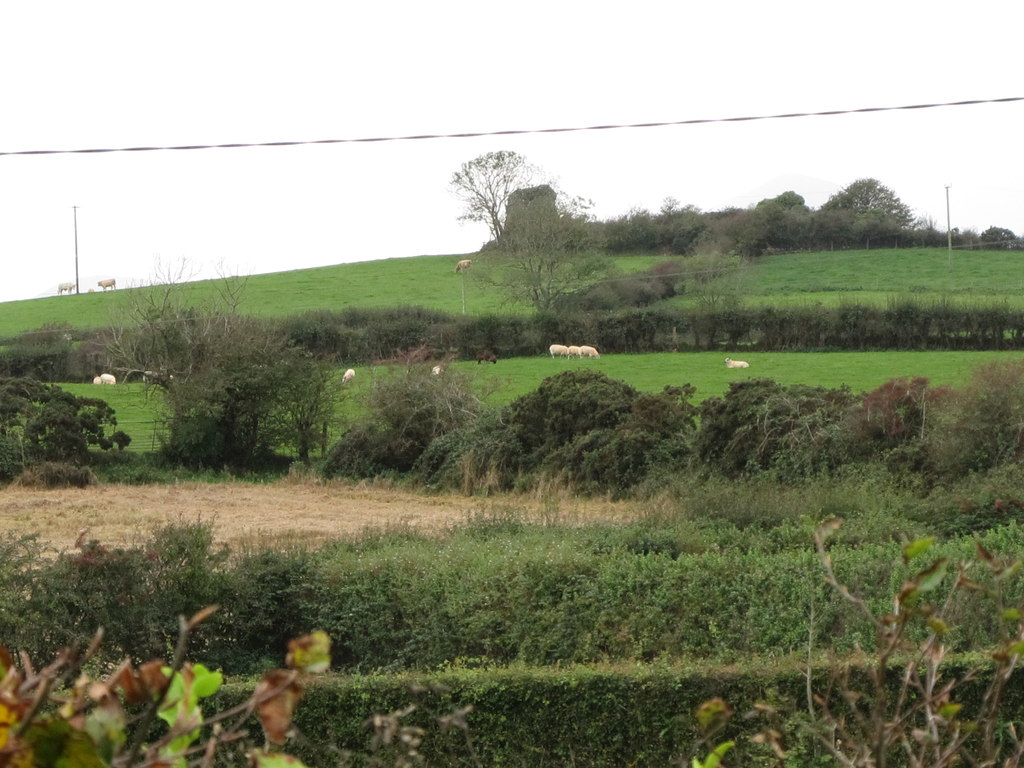
Castle Skreen from the Erenagh Road

Castleskreen (Irish: An Oireanach, meaning 'the cultivated place') is a townland located south of Downpatrick in County Down, Northern Ireland. It covers approximately 1.4 km^{2} (335.96 acres). The townland lies within the civil parish of Bright and the historic barony of Lecale Upper. The name is associated with a ruined tower house built on the site of an earlier ringfort.

== History ==
The name Castleskreen is associated with a ruined tower house located in the north-western part of the townland. This structure was built on the site of an earlier ringfort (rath). Historical records suggest that the site may have been referred to as Grenecastell in the 14th century.

Ecclesiastical documents from 1306 mention a church in the area as Capella de Grencastell, and in 1408 as Capella St Finiani de Viride Castro, meaning "the chapel of Saint Finian of Greencastle". The chapel may have replaced the abbey of Carrick, which was reportedly destroyed by John de Courcy around 1180. The abbey was located in the neighbouring townland of Erenagh, near a well dedicated to St Finian.

In the late 19th century, local accounts recorded by historian James O’Laverty described the remembered location of the abbey ruins in a field known as "The Church Park", situated near the road from Corbally to Grangicam.

The modern name Castleskreen appears to have evolved from Greencastle. Variants such as Castlecryn (1549, 1632), Castlecrinne (1649), and Castle Creen (circa 1659) suggest a Gaelic interpretation, possibly Caisteal Críon, meaning "old or decayed castle". The spelling Castlescreen, which includes an "s" not found in earlier versions, first appears in 1661.

== Archeology ==
=== Castle Skreen ===
Castle Skreen, located on a drumlin, consists of a circular earthwork, likely a rath, and the remains of a tower house are believed to date to the 15th century. Excavations were conducted in 1951 and 1958 by the Archaeological Survey of Northern Ireland. The primary goals of the excavation were to recover the full ground plan of the tower-house and to investigate whether the surrounding enclosure was used at the same time. Although these aims were not fully achieved, the excavation revealed evidence of earlier use of the site, including intermittent occupation from the first millennium AD.

The surviving structure includes a square turret with evidence of latrine shafts and corbelled vaulting. The masonry and architectural features suggest a construction date in the 15th century, similar to other tower-houses in County Down such as Kilclief Castle. The enclosure was initially fortified with a timber palisade and later with a clay bank faced with stone. A ditch was discovered, though its original purpose and date remain uncertain. Inside the enclosure, excavators found hearths, stake-holes, paving stones, and domestic debris. Pottery fragments included souterrain ware and some late medieval cooking pots. A bronze object, interpreted as a bowl escutcheon or possibly a brooch, was also found.

A large depression at the centre of the enclosure was likely man-made and used to hold water, possibly for livestock. Soil layers showed signs of human and animal activity, including plant remains and charcoal. Pollen analysis indicated partial tree clearance in the surrounding area. Soil studies by Bruce Proudfoot revealed multiple layers of occupation and abandonment. The formation of soil layers suggests that the site was abandoned for extended periods before being reused. Iron deposits forming at soil interfaces were typical of gleying processes.

Castle Skreen was used intermittently from the early medieval period and likely abandoned before the end of the 12th century. The tower-house was added in the 15th century, but there is limited evidence of concurrent use of the surrounding enclosure. The central hollow and soil layers provide insight into the site's changing function over time.

=== Rath ===
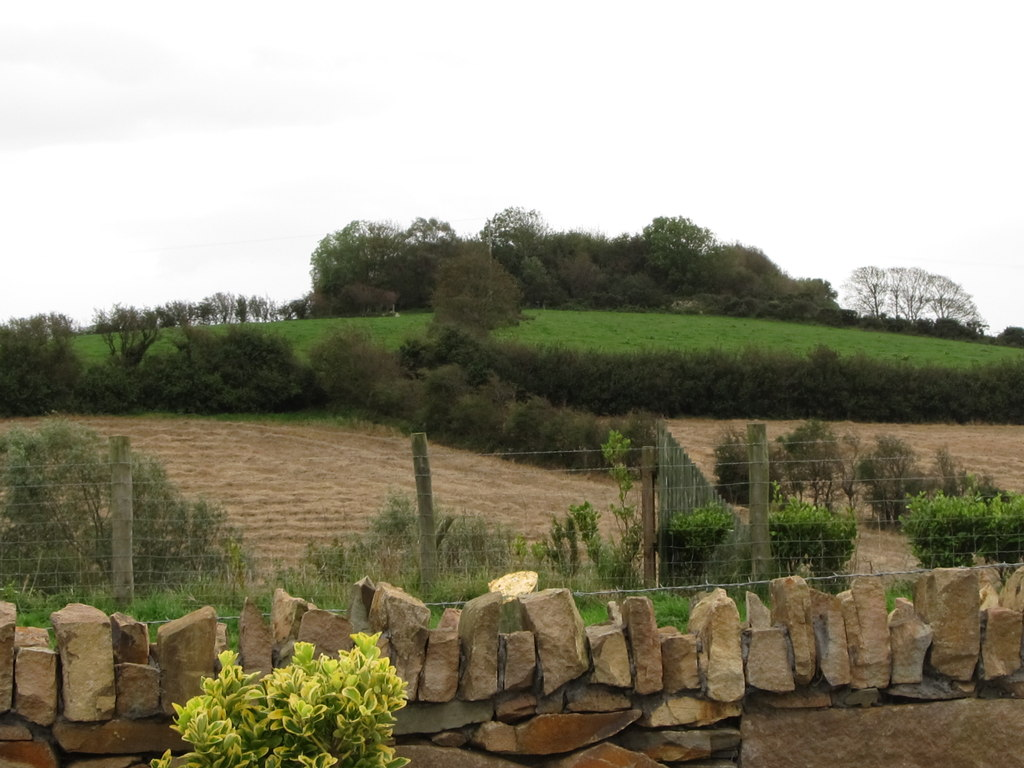
Hilltop rath in the townland of Castleskreen

This archaeological excavation investigated an earthwork comprising a circular enclosure (rath) and an internal mound (motte). Conducted between 1952 and 1955 by C. W. Dickinson and D. M. Waterman, the excavation aimed to clarify the chronological development of the site and its structural features.

Phase 1: Initial Rath Construction The earliest phase of activity involved the construction of a rath without a surrounding bank or ditch. Although no definitive evidence of a timber palisade was found, its existence cannot be ruled out due to limited excavation coverage. A prominent feature from this phase was a large, artificially excavated hollow in the southern half of the enclosure, interpreted as a possible livestock watering reservoir. The entrance was constructed as a hollow-way with dry-stone revetments. Occupation soil and a few artifacts, including animal bones and a rim sherd of souterrain ware, were recovered from this phase. It remains uncertain whether the hollow predates the rath or was part of its original design.

Phase 2: Fortification and Continued Occupation During the second phase, the rath was fortified with a substantial boulder clay bank and an internal timber palisade, evidenced by large post-holes. The entrance was reconstructed with new stone revetments and gatepost sockets. Additional occupation layers were identified, and artifacts recovered included souterrain ware, iron tools, and a socketed arrowhead. Finds at the site included wheel-thrown pottery and iron nails of a type common in England. These artifacts indicate that the site remained in use into the late 12th century.

Phase 3: Construction of the Motte and 13th-Century Activity In the third phase, a motte was constructed, likely using material excavated from a deepened section of the ditch. No structural remains were found on the motte, and it lacked typical defensive features, suggesting it may not have served as a functioning castle. The surrounding enclosure continued to be occupied, as evidenced by a range of finds including glazed jugs, cooking vessels of English type, iron tools, and a silver coin dated to circa 1205–1218. A stone-lined drain was added at the entrance, but no evidence of a functioning gate was found, implying a diminished defensive role.

Artifacts and Cultural Implications The excavation yielded a diverse assemblage of artifacts reflecting both native Irish and Anglo-Norman cultural influences. Pottery finds included hand-made souterrain ware and wheel-thrown English-style ceramics, such as glazed jugs and cooking vessels. Iron tools and weapons recovered from the site included tanged knives, a socketed arrowhead, horseshoe nails of English type, and a dagger or short sword with remnants of a wooden scabbard.

Evidence of metalworking was found in the form of crucibles, including a nearly complete pyramidal-type example commonly associated with early Irish habitation sites. Additional finds included stone spindle whorls and quernstone fragments, indicating textile production and grain processing. Other small finds included glass beads, a bone pin, and a fragment of a shale or lignite bracelet. These artifacts suggest a community that adapted to changing political and cultural circumstances during the medieval period.

== Geography ==
Townlands that border Castleskreen include:

- Ballydonnell to the west
- Ballynewport to the south
- Corbally to the west
- Erenagh to the north
- Islandbane to the east
