= Ballydargan =

Townland in County Down, Northern Ireland

Coordinates: 54°16′16″N 5°42′54″W

Ballydargan: Irish: Baile Dheargáin
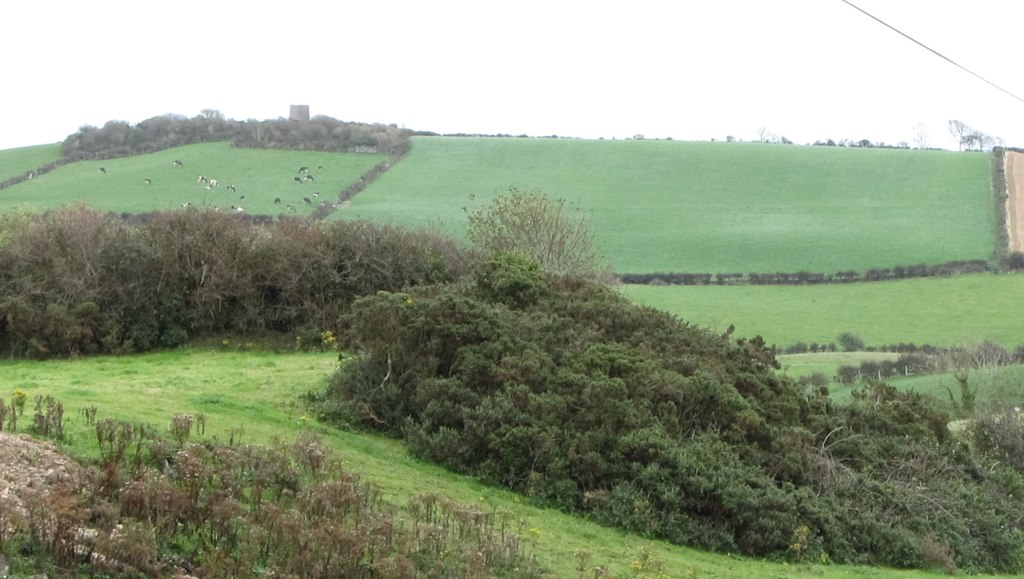
- Ballydargan Hill from the Glen Road (A disused windmill crowns the top of the hill)

- Location within County Down
- County: County Down
- Country: Northern Ireland
- Sovereign state: United Kingdom

Ballydargan is a townland eight kilometres south of Downpatrick, County Down, Northern Ireland. Ballydargan is in the parish of Bright. It has a rich and intricate history, deeply connected to its windmill and the Oakley Park demesne.

== History ==
The townland's name was recorded as Balidergan as early as 1194 and appeared as Balydergan in 1333. Ballydargan was also known as Baile Ui-Deargain, O'Dargan's town. The name Deargán, meaning 'little red (-haired) one', forms the basis of the surname Ó Deargáin, which Woulfe (1923) describes as an old surname found in Westmeath, Offaly, and Cork. This surname can be anglicized to Dargan, Dergan, Dorgan, and Dorrigan. It is possible that the final element of Ballydargan is derived from the surname Ó Deargáin, though this surname is relatively uncommon in the north of Ireland, making this less likely. Historically, the townland was divided into Upper and Lower sections.

In 1205 John de Courcy granted lands to Aristocratic tenants which gave John significant support by controlling various areas, often far from his direct supervision. They also made up the core of his elite, well-trained cavalry, which the Normans were famous for. Additionally, sub-tenants served as men-at-arms, one of those granted lands from Yorkshire was Brian de Eschallers from Yorkshire who held land in Ballydargan.

Lieutenant Richard West (d. 1644) of Ballydugan purchased Ballydergan (now Ballydargan) on July 20, 1618, for £80. An inquisition in Downpatrick on August 4, 1620, found that it was bought from James Dowdall of Lysbane. The lands were previously occupied by Henry Savage.

Lieutenant West came from England to Ireland as a lieutenant to Lord Cromwell. Thomas Cromwell purchased the estate of Downpatrick around 1604 and later became Earl of Ardglass in 1645. West had a close relationship with Cromwell's family, as evidenced by references in Thomas Cromwell's will. He also served as High Sheriff of Down in 1610 and as a Member of Parliament for Downpatrick in 1613. Lord Cromwell also granted West the village and townland of Ballydugan in June 1626. In 1634, West was also granted additional lands in the neighboring areas of Vianstown and Drumcullen. The land in Vianstown was known as Kingsfield.

Sir Arthur Chichester was appointed Lord Deputy in 1604 and initiated plans for the 'planting' of Ulster. Under these plans, first-class planters were required to build a castle and bawn within four years. Richard West, likely between 1626 and 1630, built the first house at Ballydugan within a fortified bawn protected by flanker towers on Islandnechorrick. The house was approached by a causeway over the marshes. The mansion house was described as "a large strong-house with a draw-bridge and turrets for defense." This mansion was destroyed in 1641 by rebellious servants. Lieutenant Edward Davies, in his account of the burning and pillaging of Downpatrick, mentioned that Rory O'Donlahan, a former servant, was sent by Mr. West of Ballydugan with a letter. Rory was captured and hanged in the town, though it is unclear who ordered this.

Robert Kinaston of Saul testified that Richard West of Ballydugan, in Lecale, County Down, had his house taken, his corn and cattle lost, and his entire estate overrun after strong resistance. The mansion house was not rebuilt for over a century. By 1744, Henry West, the then owner, was living in part of the outbuildings that had been converted into a dwelling. Richard West lived for three years after the destruction of his mansion house and died without a will on July 2, 1644, leaving behind his son, Roger West.

== Ballydargan windmill ==
The windmill and demesne played an agricultural role and also served as local landmarks. In the late 18th century, Gordon Bigham, originally from Scotland, acted as an agent for the lease of the Ballydargan windmill. This windmill was used for drying grain before the introduction of tile kilns. Turf fires were lit against walls, and grain was dried on straw spread over branches, then brushed down into winnowing sheets (the process to remove the lighter chaff, leaving just the grain).

Before the chapels were built, Mass was celebrated at the Mass rock, located a little west of Coniamstown chapel. At this site, you can still see an altar and reredos carved out of solid rock, along with two small triangular recesses for holding cruets and other items needed for Mass. Mass was also held in the Quarry at the Green Road. During these celebrations, guards were stationed at various places with good elevation including Ballydargan Mill to alert the community of approaching priest-hunters.

== Oakley Park Demesne ==
Oakley Park was located in a wooded estate (called a demesne) covering over 104 acres. The house faced south and offered views of Dundrum Bay, St. John's Point Lighthouse, and the Mourne Mountains. In 1676, William Hamilton received a charter that made his lands the Manor of Hamilton's Hill in Ballydargan. Before the 1641 rebellion, the Dowdal family held Ballydargan under the Earls of Kildare.

Oakley Park has seen a number families as its occupants over the centuries:

- Dowdall (c. 1334 - 1670)

1. The Dowdal family's home was in Oakley Park, along the stream that borders the townland

- Hamilton (1670 - 1721)
- Harrison (1721 - 1789): Nicholas Harrison named the estate "Oakley" due to the oak trees.

1. Counsellor Nicholas Harrison (d. February 9, 1788), significantly expanded the house by adding new buildings in front and on one side, with connecting walls over six feet thick.
2. He named the place Oakley because of the many magnificent oak trees on the estate.

- Annesley (1789 - 1823): Rev. William Annesley

1. Moved from Castlewellan when he became Dean of Down Cathedral, Downpatrick in 1787. He bought Oakley mansion and its large estate and hired architect and builder Charles Lilly carry out improvement to the house. He lived in Oakley for the rest of his life.
2. He and Wills Hill, the Earl of Hillsborough, are credited with restoring the Cathedral over the next ten years.

- Ruthven (1823 - 1831): Edward Southwell Ruthven

1. Edward Southwell Ruthven (c. 1772 – 1836) was an Irish politician and a strong supporter of Daniel O'Connell.
2. He served as a Member of Parliament (MP) for Downpatrick from 1806 to 1807 and again from 1830 to 1832.
3. He also represented Dublin City as a Repealer from 1832 to 1835.

- Birney (1831 - 1928): The last full-time occupant was Jessie Jane Birney, who died in 1928.

The manor house was demolished in the 1950s, and the estate was later purchased by John Rea in 1929, though he did not reside there.

== Lead mine ==
Ballydargan, part of the Ward's Estate, had a brief period between 1787 and 1797 when 30-40 tons of ore were extracted. However, mining activity in Ballydargan dates back to the early 1720s, as shown by letters from Magnus Prince of Killough to Judge Michael Ward of Castle Ward. Killough, previously known as St. Anne's Port, was developed in the 1720s by Judge Ward, the father of the first Lord Bangor. The Wards did not own the more convenient ports of Ardglass or Strangford, so they developed Killough to serve their estates. The Reverend John Dubourdieu, in his 1802 Statistical Survey of the County of Down, mentions Harris's information about the Dundrum mine. He also notes that lead ore had been found in several other locations over the past fifty years, including two recently discovered veins on Lady Roden's estate in Ballydargan, which he describes as promising.

While examining Lead Mine Rocks, geologist Thomas Weaver from the Hibernian Mining Company learned that lead ore had been extracted in Ballydargan, about two and a half miles from Killough, on the Earl of Roden's land. During the procurement of stone to build Oakley House, a quarry was cut vertically into the clay-slate rocks to the northeast of the house. This quarry, marked on the 1834 edition of the 6-inch OS Map, yielded several baskets of lead ore.

== Gallery ==
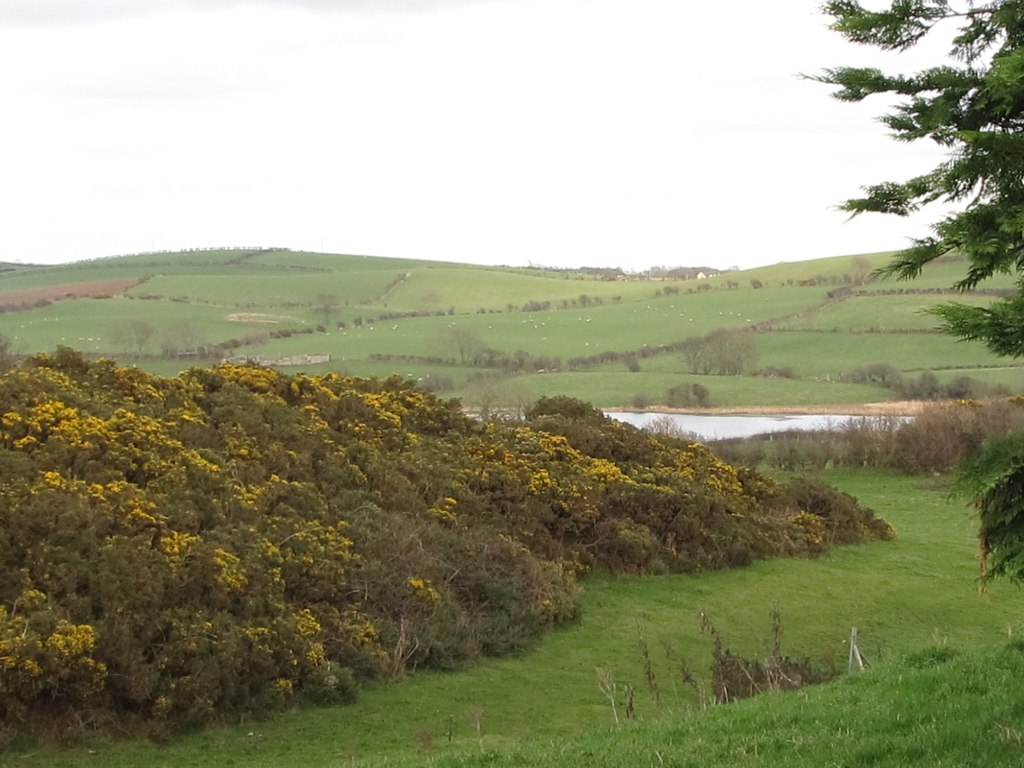
Ballydargan Lake from the Ballylucas Road (2012)

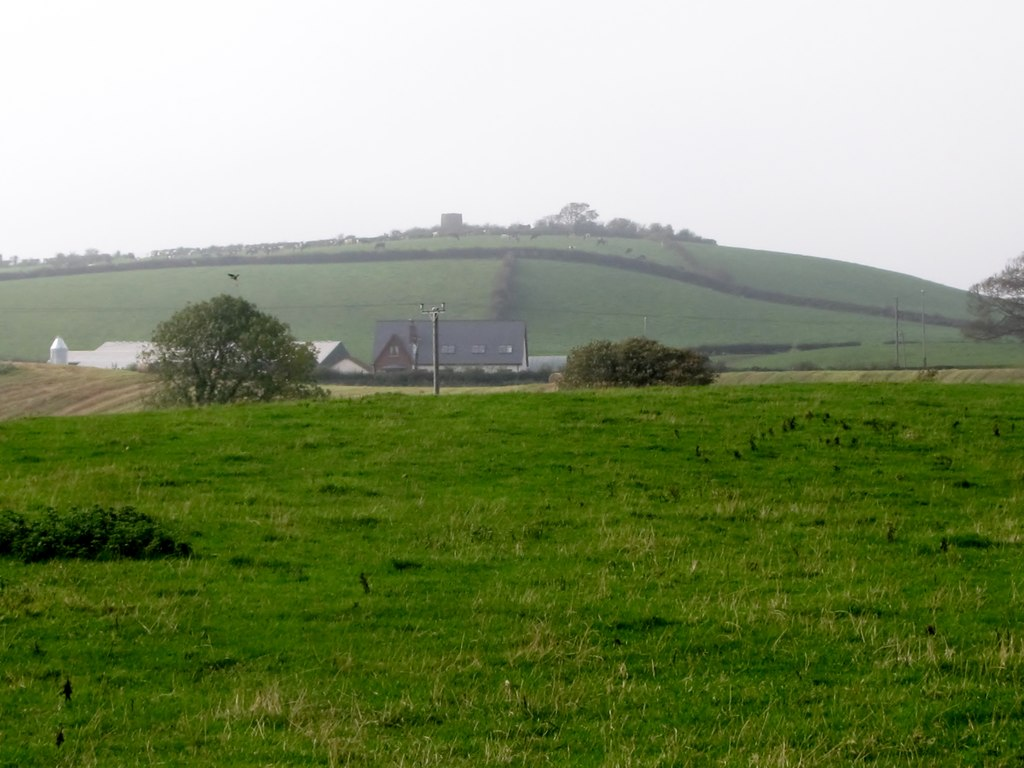
Ballydargan windmill south of the Crowbane Road (2011)

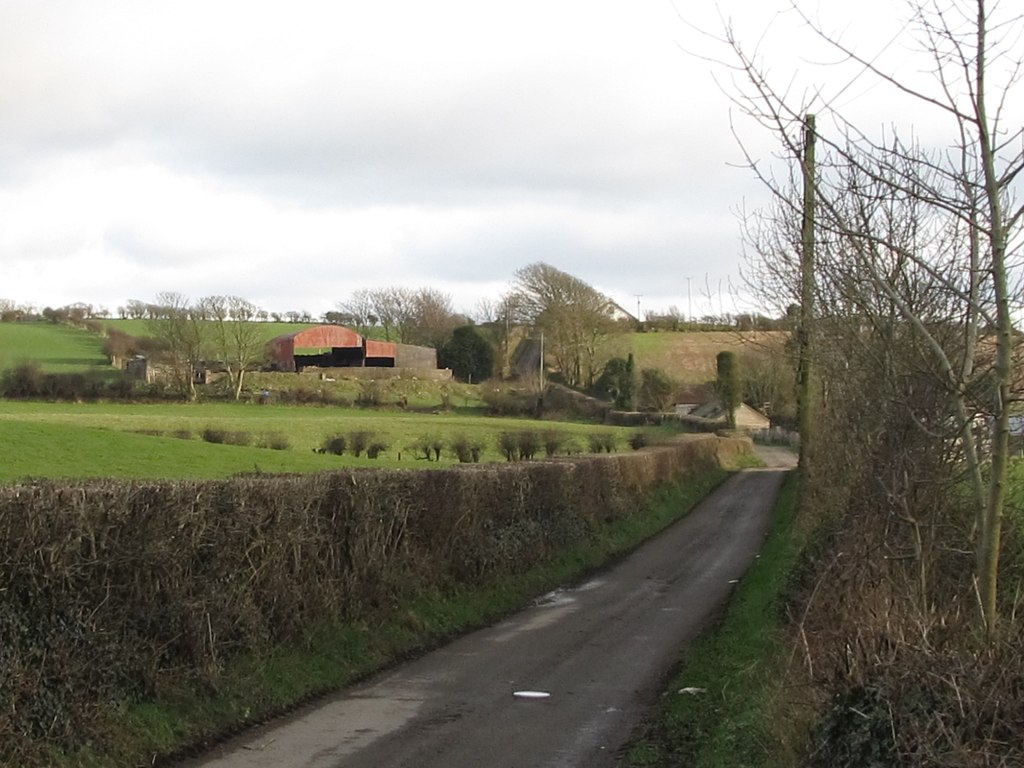
Glen Road climbing towards the summit ridge of Ballydargan Hill (2012)

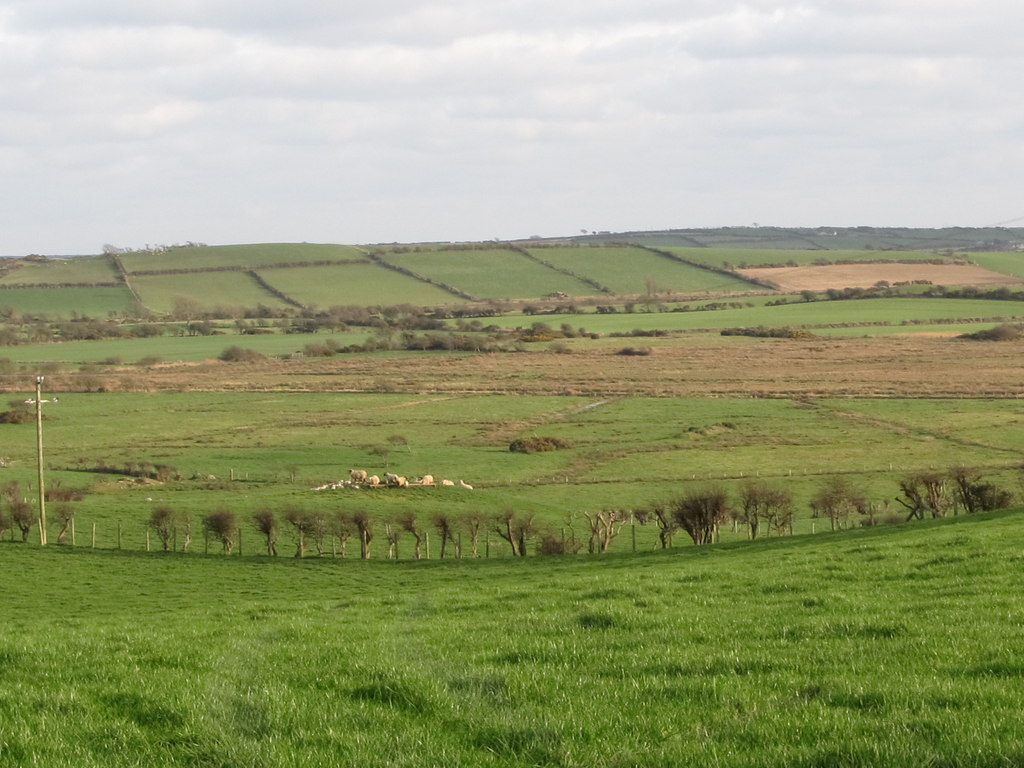
Bogland in the Ballydargan River valley (2012)

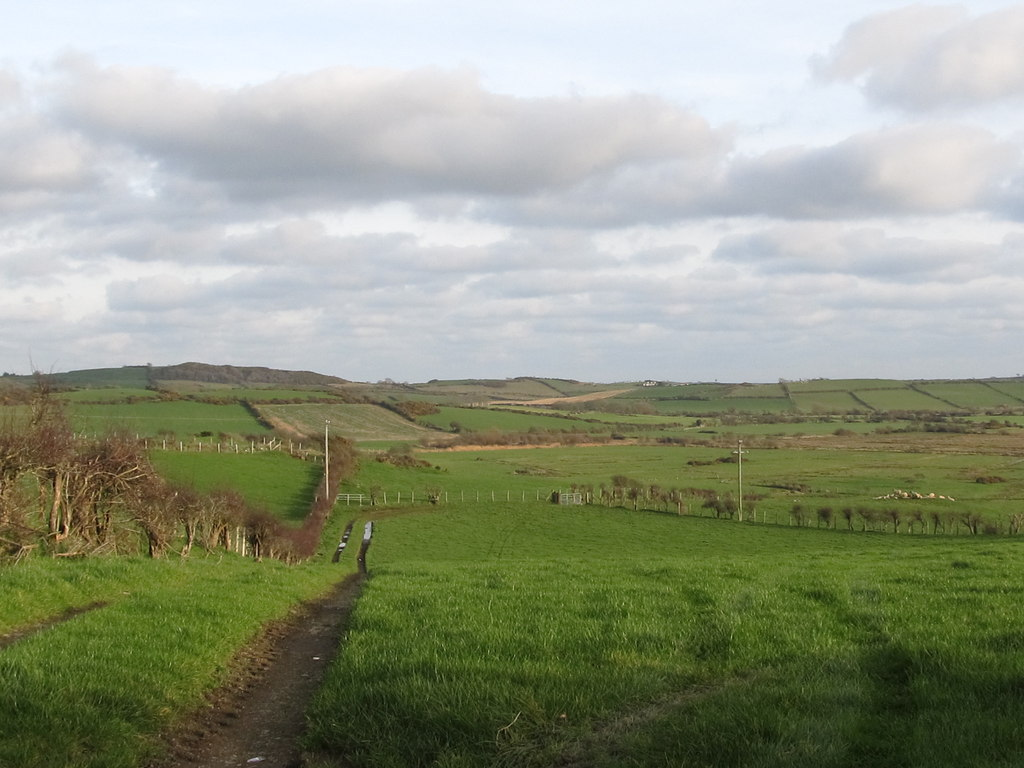
Farm track leading down to the Ballydargan Valley (2012)

== Geography ==
Townlands that border ballydargan include:

- Ballylucas to the west
- Ballynagallagh to the south
- Ballynewport to the west
- Carrowbane to the east
- Legamaddy to the north
- Rathmullan Lower to the south
- Rathmullan Upper to the west
- Whigamstown to the east
