= Legamaddy =

Townland in County Down, Northern Ireland

Coordinates: 54°16′45.1″N 5°42′41.8″W

Legamaddy: Irish: Lag an Mhadaidh
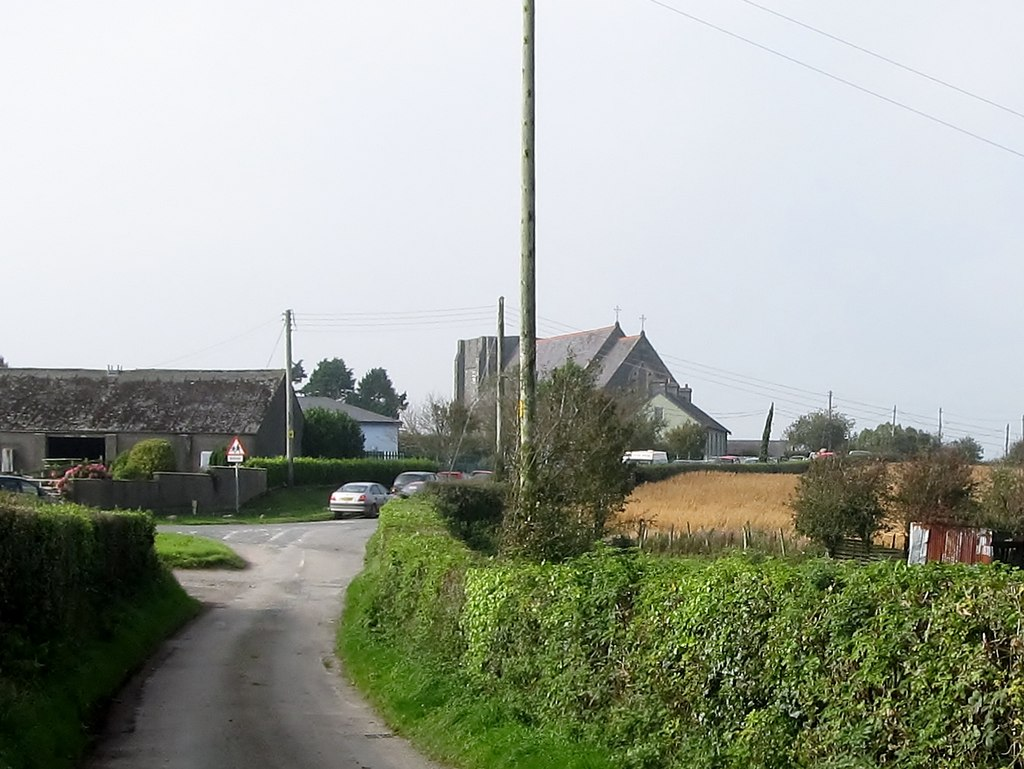
- The school run at St Patrick's Primary, Legamaddy

- Location within County Down
- County: County Down
- Country: Northern Ireland
- Sovereign state: United Kingdom

Legamaddy is a townland located in County Down, Northern Ireland, within the civil parish of Bright and the barony of Lecale Upper. The Irish name for Legamaddy is "Lag an Mhadaidh," which translates to "Hollow of the Dog."

Legamaddy is situated near Downpatrick, a town known for its historical significance, including connections to St. Patrick. The townland covers an area of approximately 85.63 hectares (211.59 acres) and is bordered by several other townlands, including Ballydargan, Ballynoe, and Coniamstown.

== History ==
There is a small lake at the south-west corner of the townland, which may be the ‘hollow’ referred to in the place-name. Legamaddy was originally called Carrowmalt. It has also been recorded in deeds of 1729 and 1760 as Catrowmaltagh, to be otherwise Legamuddy, Liag-na-mnda, “the dog’s stone.”

It was owned by Thomas Cromwell, 3rd Earl of Ardglass, in 1669 and leased to Patrick Shane from 1637 to 1669, who then sublet it to William Hamilton Esq. The name of this townland seems to have no recorded mention before 1710 when it had a slightly different spelling (Leggamaddy). In 1755 it was named Liggmaddy and in 1868 it was known as Liggamaddy.

The population of Legamaddy in 1841 was 57.

== St. Patrick's Catholic Church ==
St. Patrick's Legamaddy, erected in 1865 by Fr. Richard Killen, Parish Priest, celebrated its 150th anniversary in 2015. This church was built to replace the former church at Coniamstown, which dated back to before 1745. The original Catholic chapel in Coniamstown was erected around 1745 and re-roofed and slated in 1796. By 1836, this chapel, described as having no seats but accommodating 400 people. It was replaced by the new church in Legamaddy townland with the foundation stone laid on August 27, 1862.

Following the Great Famine, the Catholic Church in Ireland, along with the diocese of Down and Connor, began revitalizing efforts to support and organize their congregation enabled by the Emancipation Act of 1829. Archbishop Paul Cullen of Armagh led these initiatives. The Great Famine had been a devastating blow, but with over a decade having passed, there was now momentum to establish new catholic churches as well as new primary and secondary schools. So it was in these times that Saint Patrick's Church was designed in the early Gothic style by architect Mr. John O'Neill from Belfast. In addition to working on Legamaddy Church, where he was responsible for designing and preparing drawings and documentation for tendering, he was also actively involved in designing and preparing tender documents for the Church of St. Mary, Star of the Sea, in Whitehouse, Newtownabbey. A notice to builders regarding this project was published in the Belfast Morning News on Saturday, November 29, 1862.

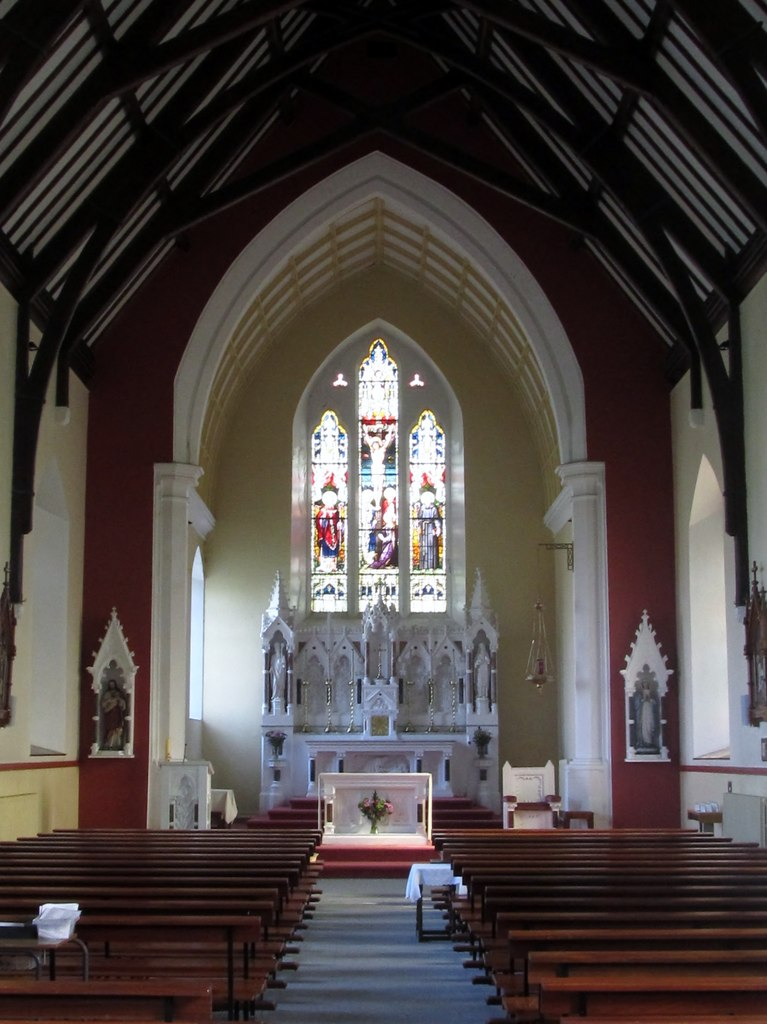
The interior of St Patrick's Church, Legamaddy

The church's architectural elements include a long nave, square ended chancel, a clearly expressed sacristy, porches (on the north, south and western sides of the church). The church also tower features a large, square, and squat tower with corner buttresses and a recessed pointed arch doorway. However, the tower remains incomplete due to insufficient foundations, which were unable to support the originally planned eighty-foot tower with an embattled parapet.

In front of the church stands a stone Celtic cross, commemorating the missions given by the Passionate Fathers in July 1870 and July 1885. The church with the storey and a half parochial house also has an adjoining graveyard, with the stone ruins of the former primary school still present nearby. The long axis of the church is oriented towards the road and its unfinished tower is positioned away from the entrance gate.

The site also includes a Mass rock where Catholics worshipped during Penal times. The priests in 1704 and 1768 were Rev. Seneca (or Jenkin) Smith and Rev. Magnus Grant, respectively.

== School ==
The current site of St. Patrick's Primary School is located next door to the church. In 2014, the school was extended and refurbished to create a new learning environment for children from Primary 1 to Primary 7. The building includes seven classrooms with interactive whiteboards, a dedicated play-based learning area for younger pupils, and a fully resourced ICT suite with 12 computer workstations. Pupils also use iPads to support their learning and develop essential digital skills. The school grounds have separate play areas for younger and older pupils. A modular play system includes an outdoor classroom, musical instruments, a water wall, and a trim trail, all on a cushioned surface.

=== Former school building ===
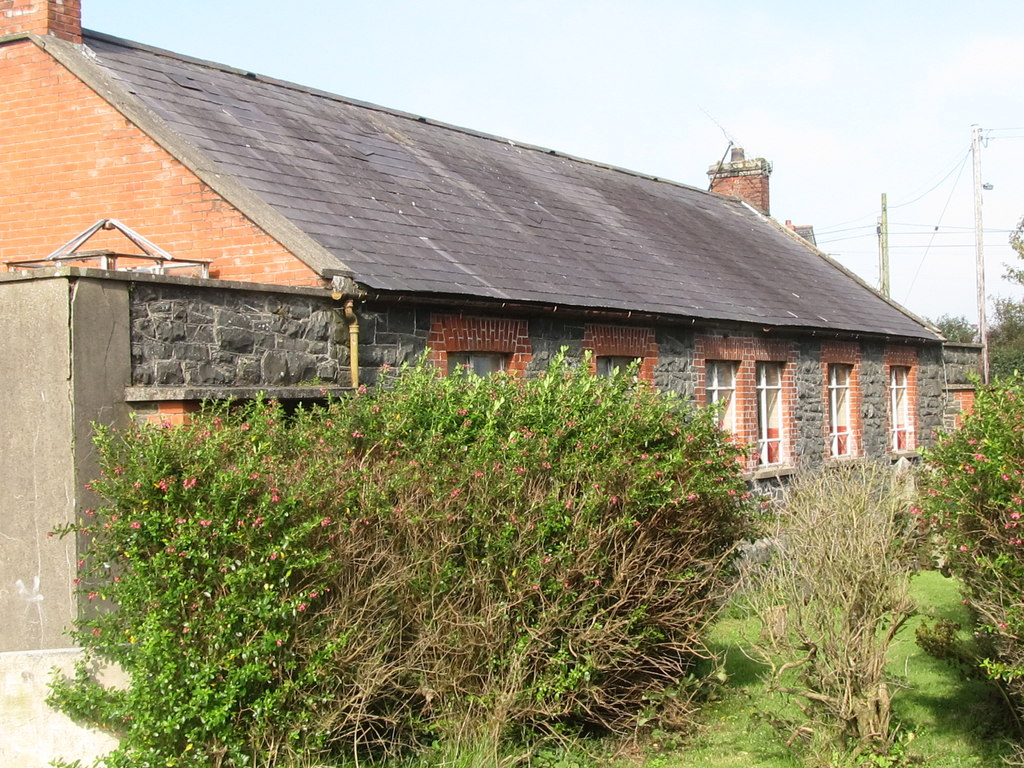
St Patrick's Parish Hall, Legamaddy (formerly the primary school)

Adjacent to the church is a stone building which was formerly a primary school, also established by Fr. Richard Killen, which now serves as the parish hall and dates back to 1837. Samuel Lewis, in his Topographical Dictionary of Ireland, described it as "a school of about 80 boys and 50 girls, for which a school-house in the churchyard was built by subscription; also a pay school, in which are about 20 boys and 20 girls"."

In 1883, there were 158 pupils enrolled in the school with an average daily attendance of 64 (86 boys & 72 girls). By 1892 there were only 64 pupils enrolled in the school with an average daily attendance of just 37 (all were boys). The school originally featured a one-room design, typical of that era in Ireland, and was heated by a pot belly stove. Over the years, it was converted into three separate classrooms.

=== Former school pupils ===
- Reality TV star Matthew McNabb attended Legamaddy Primary School.
- County Down GAA Senior Football Championship final winners 1994 team member Richard Starkey attended Legamaddy Primary School.

== Legamaddy House ==
Legamaddy House was originally owned by the Southwell Estate in 1752. It was later bought by the Ker family in 1835, and as of 1886, it was the residence of John Hutton.

== Geography ==
Townlands that border Legamaddy include:

- Ballydargan to the south
- Ballylucas to the west
- Ballynewport to the west
- Ballynoe to the north
- Carrowbane to the east
- Coniamstown to the east
- Whigamstown to the east

== Gallery ==
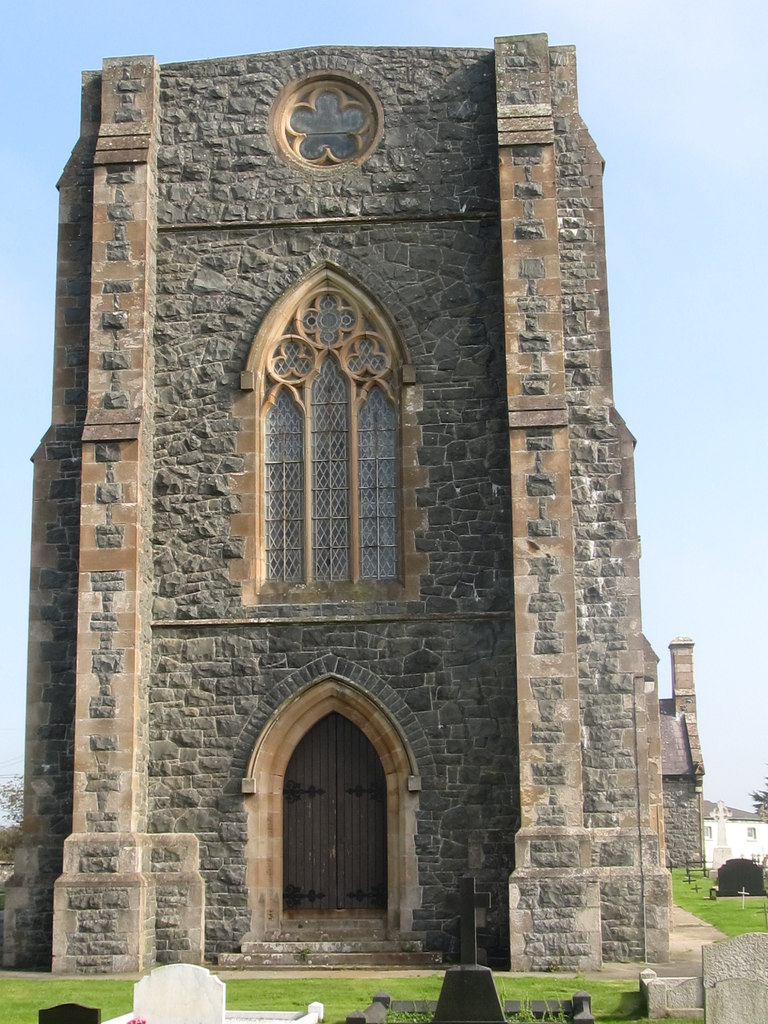
The tower of St Patrick's Chapel, Legamaddy (2011)

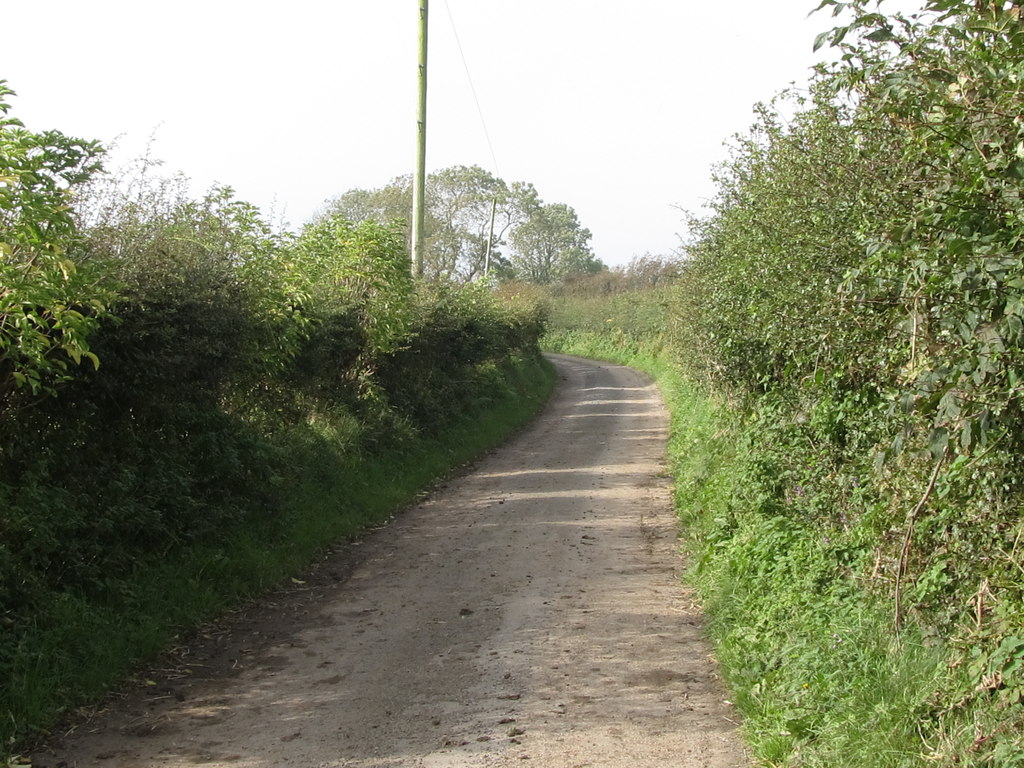
Carrowbane Road east of Legamaddy Chapel (2011)

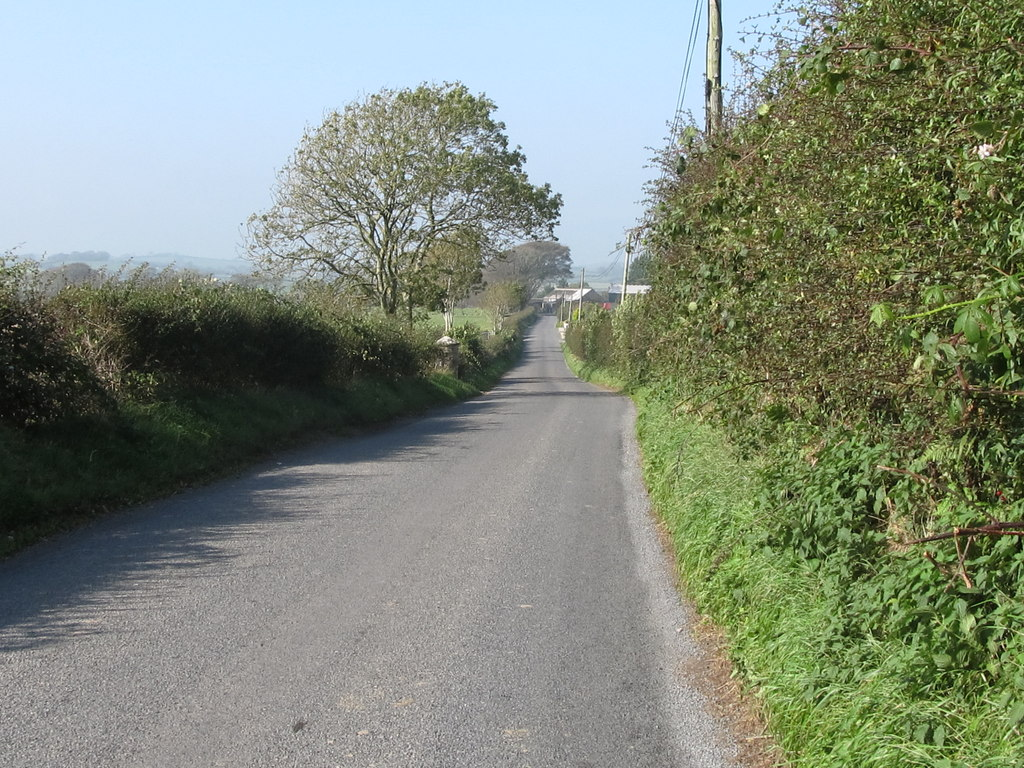
The Ballynoe Road at Legamaddy (2011)

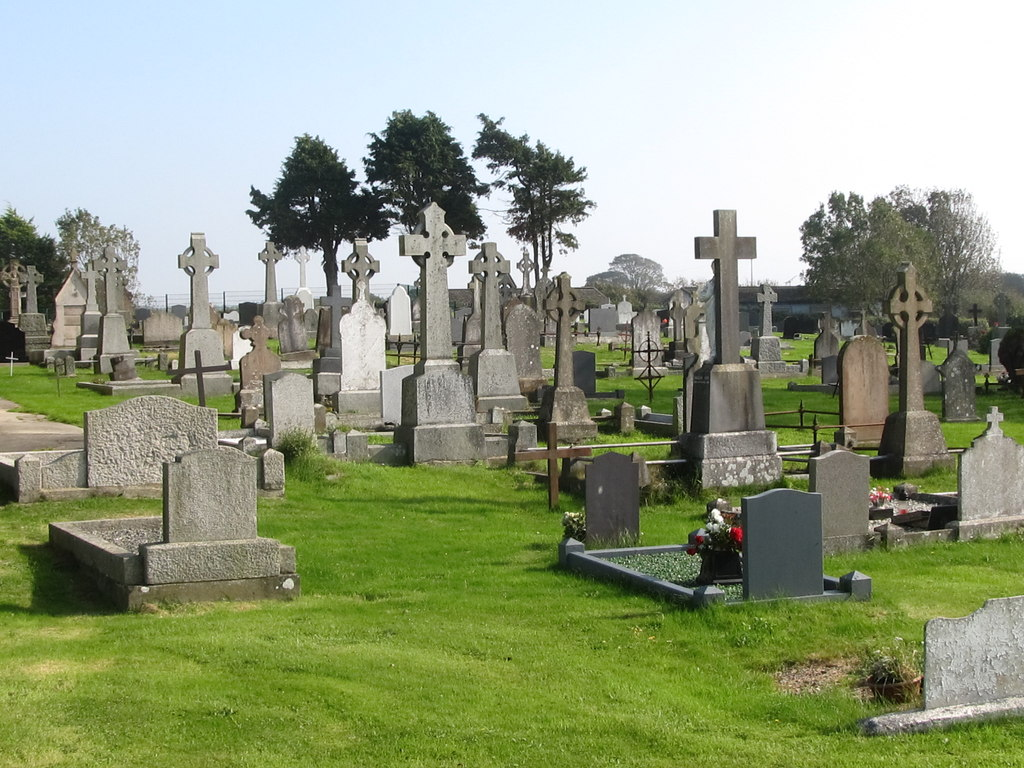
The grave yard of St Patrick's Catholic Chapel, Legamaddy (2011)

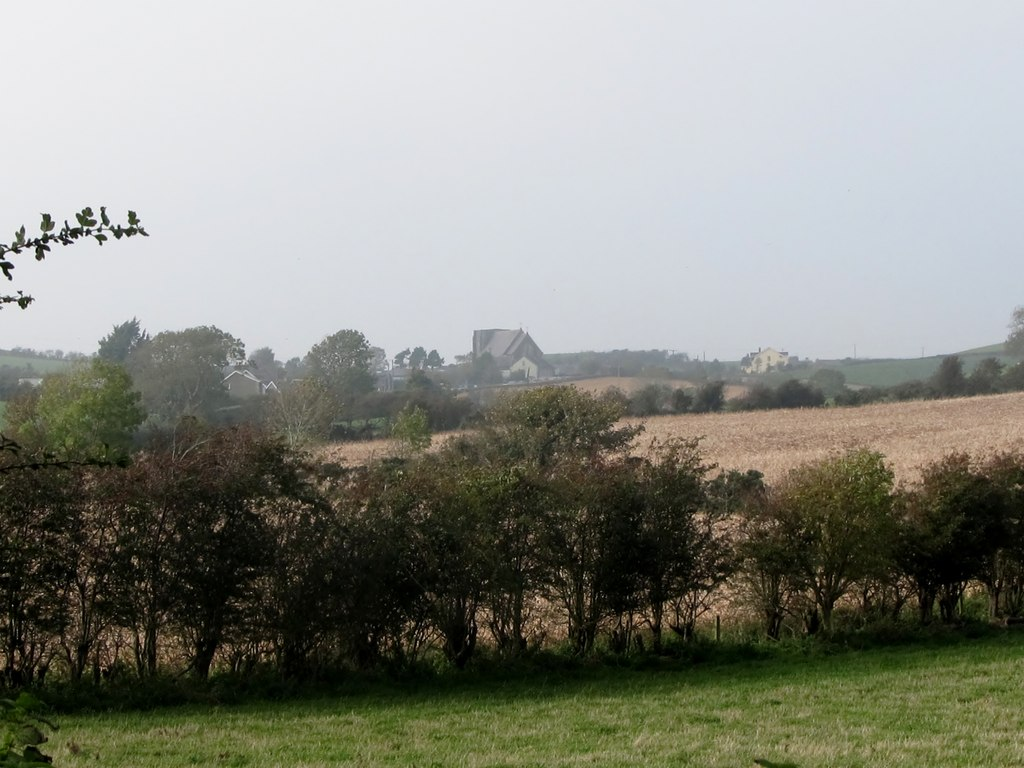
View towards Legamaddy Catholic Chapel (2011)

== See also ==
- List of townlands in County Down
