= Bright Castle =

Ruined castle in County Down, Northern Ireland

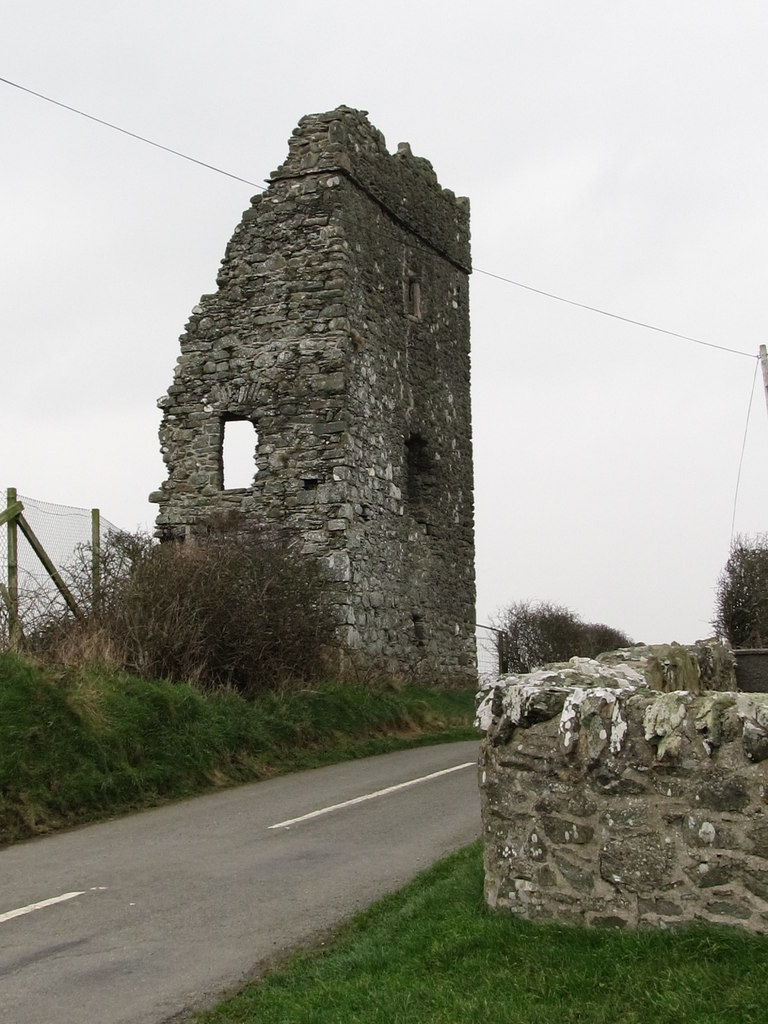
- Ruins of Bright Castle, County Down

- Location in Northern Ireland
- Interactive map of Bright Castle
- 54.2694°N 5.6875°W
- Type: Tower house
- Location: Bright, County Down, Northern Ireland
- Region: Ulster

History
- Built: Late 15th or early 16th century
- Built by: Unknown

Site notes
- Material: Stone
- Condition: Ruined
- Owner: Public
- Public access: Yes

Designations
- Designation: Scheduled Historic Monument

Bright Castle is a tower house near Downpatrick, County Down, Northern Ireland. The ruined structure, which is a Scheduled Historic Monument in the townland of Bright, lies within Down District Council area, on Coniamstown Road, at grid ref: J5066 3822. It is sited on the edge of a ridge, overlooking the surrounding countryside.

== Architecture ==
The castle originally consisted of three storeys. Today, only the east wall remains fully intact, while the north and south walls extend partially westward by approximately 2 to 3 metres. The rest of the structure has disappeared.

The surviving east wall measures approximately 6.4 metres in length and 1.15 metres in thickness. The other walls are about 1.3 metres thick at ground level, narrowing to 1 metre on the upper floors. The ground floor was originally covered by a barrel vault, which remains partially visible in the side walls and gable. Lighting was provided by three small hourglass-shaped windows.

The first storey was lit by larger windows in the east wall. A stone-framed window is also present at the second-storey level. Drainage from the parapet was directed outward through channels that exit at a string course on the exterior of the east elevation. A parapet walk still survives around the top of the standing structure. Architectural evidence suggests it may have had square corner turrets, similar to those at Margaret's Castle in Ardglass, although these features no longer survive.

== History ==
Bright Castle is believed to have been constructed in the late 15th or early 16th century. It is located on what was the estate of Janico Dartas (also known as Janico d'Artois), a soldier of Navarre who came to Ireland with King Richard II in 1394 and was granted lands for his service. In 1515, the castle passed into the hands of Gerald FitzGerald, 9th Earl of Kildare.

The structure is locally believed to have been at one time occupied by a branch of the Anglo-Norman de Russel (or Roisel) family. During a military campaign in 1538, Leonard Grey, 1st Viscount Grane, captured and reportedly destroyed many castles in the Lecale region and this may have included Bright Castle.

== See also ==
- Bright, County Down
- Castles in Northern Ireland
