= Down (civil parish) =

Civil parish in County Down, Northern Ireland

Down is a civil parish in County Down, Northern Ireland. It is situated in the historic barony of Lecale Upper.

== Settlements ==
The civil parish contains the following settlements:

- Downpatrick

== Townlands ==
Down civil parish contains the following townlands:

- Ardmeen
- Audleys Acre
- Ballydonety
- Ballydonnell
- Ballydugan
- Ballykeel
- Ballykilbeg
- Ballymote Lower
- Ballymote Middle
- Ballymote Upper
- Ballyrolly
- Ballystrew
- Ballyvange
- Ballywarren
- Bonecastle
- Cargagh
- Clogher
- Corbally
- Demesne of Down
- Grangicam
- Hollymount
- Jordans Acre
- Killavees
- Lisnamaul
- Magheralagan
- Marshallstown
- Quarter Cormick
- Russells Quarter
- Saul Quarter
- Struell
- Tobercorran
- Tobermoney
- Tullymurry
- Woodgrange

== See also ==
- List of civil parishes of County Down
