= Rathmullan, County Down =

Civil parish in County Down, Northern Ireland

Rathmullan is a civil parish in County Down, Northern Ireland. It is situated mainly in the historic baronies of Lecale Upper, with one townland in Lecale Lower.

== Settlements ==
The civil parish contains the following settlements:

- Killough

== Townlands ==
Rathmullan civil parish contains the following townlands:

- Ballylucas
- Ballynewport
- Ballyorgan
- Ballyplunt
- Ballyvaston
- Glebe
- Islandbane
- Killough
- Rathmullan Lower
- Rathmullan Upper
- Saint Johns Point

== See also ==
- List of civil parishes of County Down
