= Bright, County Down =

Civil parish in Northern Ireland

Bright Breachtán Bricht
- Civil parish and townland
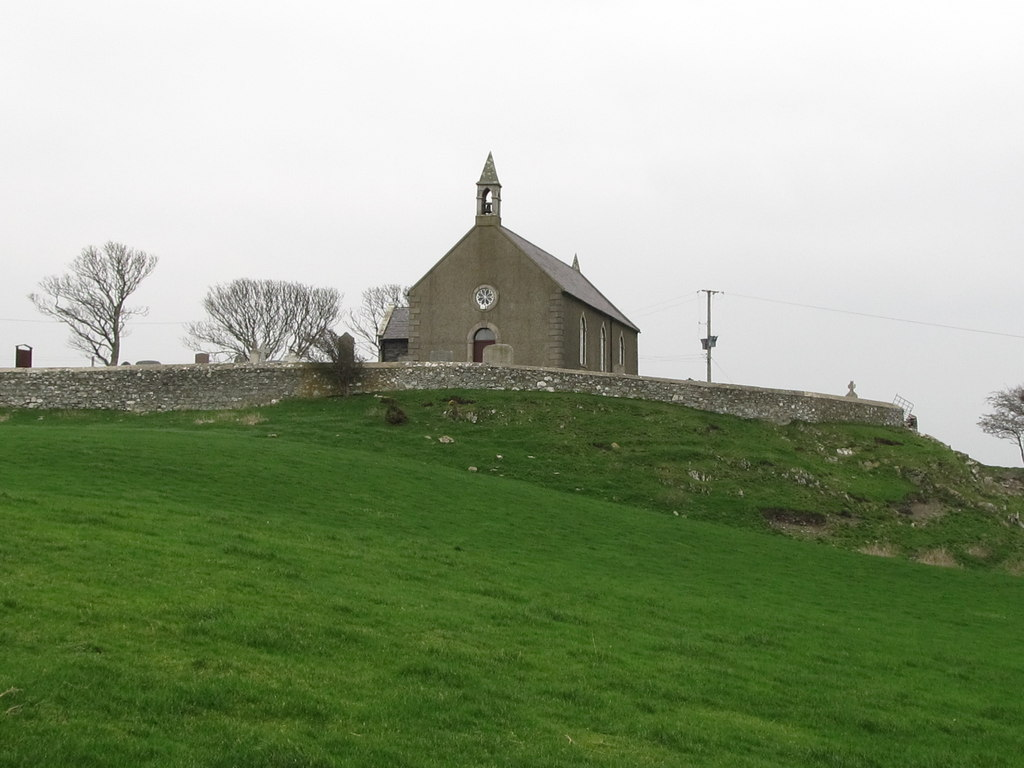
- Bright's Church of Ireland parish church
- Etymology: From the Old Irish Mrechtan
- Location within Northern Ireland Bright (island of Ireland)
- Coordinates: 54.2695°N 5.6876°W
- Country: United Kingdom
- Constituent country: Northern Ireland
- County: County Down
- Barony: Lecale Upper

Area
  - Total: 8.66 sq mi (22.44 km^{2})

Population
  - Total: 1,284
- (2011 census; Bright townland only)
- Time zone: UTC+0 (GMT)
  - Summer (DST): UTC+1 (BST)
- Postcode: BT30
- Dialing code: 028

Bright is a civil parish in County Down, Northern Ireland. It is situated in the barony of Lecale Upper. It lies approximately three miles southeast of Downpatrick, near the road to Killough. The parish includes 21 townlands and covers around 5,544 acres of mostly agricultural land (the townland is 336 acres). Bright is mentioned in the Tripartite Life of Saint Patrick by its old Irish name of Mrechtan.

== History ==
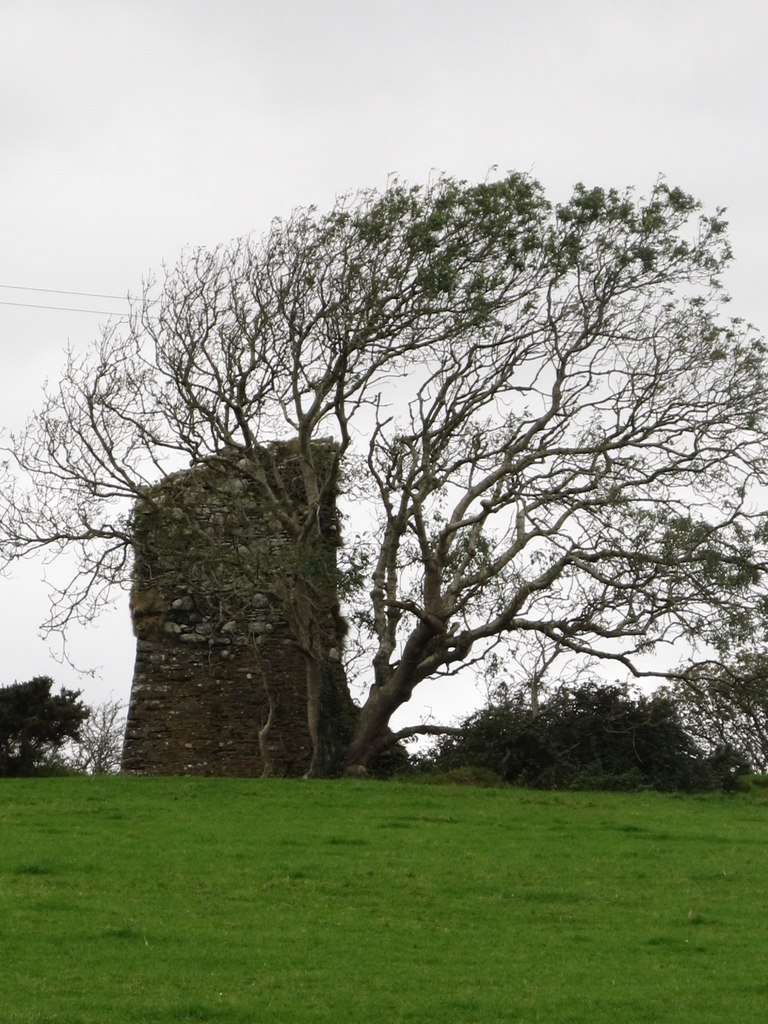
Ruins of Castle Skreen tower house

Bright was historically part of a group of six parishes that made up the union and deanery of Down. In 1834, it was separated by act of council and became a distinct parish. At the same time, the townland of Carrowdressagh (now Carrowdressex), previously part of Kilclief, was annexed to Bright. Near the church are the ruins of Bright Castle, and about a mile and a quarter to the west are the remains of Castle Screen, which was built within an ancient ringfort. Nearby are also the ruins of the Abbey of Erynagh, founded in 1126 or 1127 by Magnell Makenlefe, a king of Ulster. The abbey was destroyed in 1177 by John de Courcy, who later transferred its lands to the Abbey of Inch. Remnants of ancient stone circles and other pre-Christian structures are still visible in the area.

=== Parish church ===
In 1178, John de Courcy confirmed the church of 'Bricht' to the See of Downpatrick. A stone church was built in the 12th or 13th century. In 1316 the church, filled with people, was burned during Edward Bruce's campaign in Ireland. A 1622 survey reported the church to be in ruins and it was not restored until 1745. The restored medieval church of Bright is located near the castle.

=== Sunday school ===
The development of Sunday schools in Ireland was influenced by the efforts of the Reverend Dr. Kennedy, who served as curate in the parish. He established his Sunday school programme in 1770 before Robert Raikes organised his Sunday-schools ten years later in July 1780. Concerned by the neglect of Sunday observance among local youth, Dr. Kennedy initiated gatherings focused on singing practice. This initiative proved successful and was subsequently expanded to include the reading of Psalms and scripture lessons. By late 1785, Dr. Kennedy became aware of similar educational movements in England aimed at establishing Sunday schools. Recognising that his own initiative aligned with these efforts, he collaborated with local associates to adopt an approach modelled on the English system. During the winter months, they disseminated information about the concept and secured financial support from interested parties. Following these preparations, the Bright Sunday School was formally inaugurated on the first Sunday of May 1786. Robert Henry, Esq., was appointed superintendent, with members of his family and other "respected" individuals serving as instructors. Thomas Turr, the parish clerk, also contributed to the school’s operations.

=== Great Famine ===
While other areas of Ireland experienced severe hardship during the Great Irish Famine (1845–1851), the civil parish of Bright was an exception. The only known return from County Down, submitted by Reverend John M'Kenna, parish priest of Bright, reported minimal impact from the famine. His account noted three or four cases of fever and no deaths from starvation. Maurice O'Connell remarked that this was the only instance among clergy returns where a parish was described as largely unaffected. In 1841, only 14% of housing in Bright was classified as fourth class, and the female illiteracy rate stood at 38%, suggesting relatively favourable social conditions. The parish operated under the Temporary Relief Act (Soup Kitchen Act) and had previously adopted voluntary local assessment for relief.

== Saints ==
=== Saint Loarn ===
Saint Loarn, Bishop of Bright around 540 AD, was commemorated in the early Irish Church with a feast day on September 11. According to the Tripartite Life of Saint Patrick, he resided in Brettain (also Bretan or brechtain) later Bright, where a small settlement (cathair, or civitas meaning both city and bishop's see) existed. He is said to have admonished Saint Patrick for holding the hand of a boy who was playing near his church. Further details about his life are scarce, and no record of his successors in the See of Bright is known. It is believed that when the See was later merged into the Diocese of Down, its lands passed to the Bishops of Down.

=== Saint Díchu ===
During his missionary travels in Ireland, Saint Patrick journeyed south from Sabhall (Saul) to preach to Ros mac Trichim, a prominent prince of Bright and a scholar of Berla Féini, the earliest form of the Irish language. Ros resided in Derlus (also known as Lireathan), an ancient earthen fort believed to be located at the site of the present-day Castle of Bright. Patrick baptised Ros at a nearby holy well, in Ballintubber ("town of the well") situated in Bright, and Ros later became one of nine commissioners appointed to compile the Senchas Már, a foundational text of early Irish law so authoritative that Brehon judges were not permitted to alter its contents. Ros is believed to have been a Brehon himself, and since the office was hereditary, his brother Díchu mac Trichim may have held a similar legal role in Saul. Díchu is traditionally regarded as Patrick’s first convert in Ireland and is venerated as a saint, with strong associations to Saul.

=== Saint Mo Chaoi ===
On his journey through Bright, Saint Patrick encountered a young swineherd named Mochae (died approx. 490 A.D.), whom he baptized, tonsured, and gifted with a Gospel book, a reliquary, and a crozier said to have been divinely bestowed. Mochae later founded the church known as Detech-Mochae on Noendruim. The Monastery of Nendrum (Nóendruimm) on Mahee (a phonetic spelling of Mochaoi) island is in Strangford Lough. The monastery's founder, St. Mo Chaoi of Dál Fiatach who was originally named Caolán, was known as Mochaoi by the Irish people.

== Historical sites ==
=== Bright Castle ===
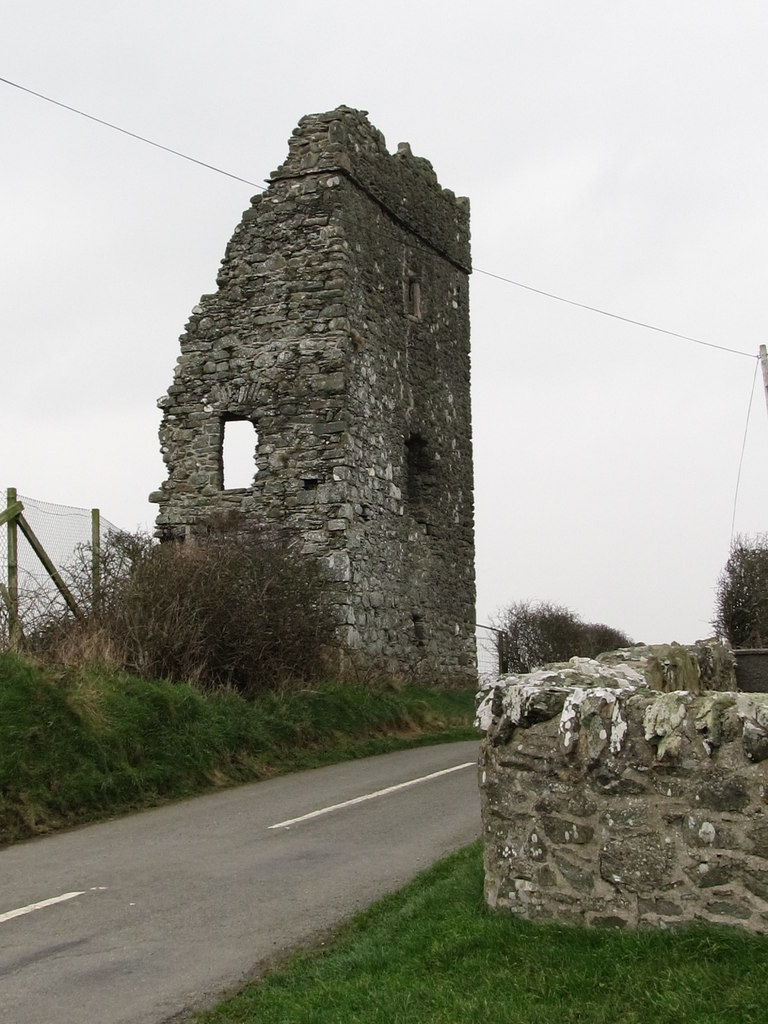
Bright Castle

Bright Castle, a 16th-century stone tower house situated along Coniamstown Road, is protected as a Scheduled Historic Monument. Now in ruins, the castle's architectural features follow the typical design of tower houses in Britain and Ireland, featuring a three-storey rectangular stone tower.

=== Ballydargan windmill ===
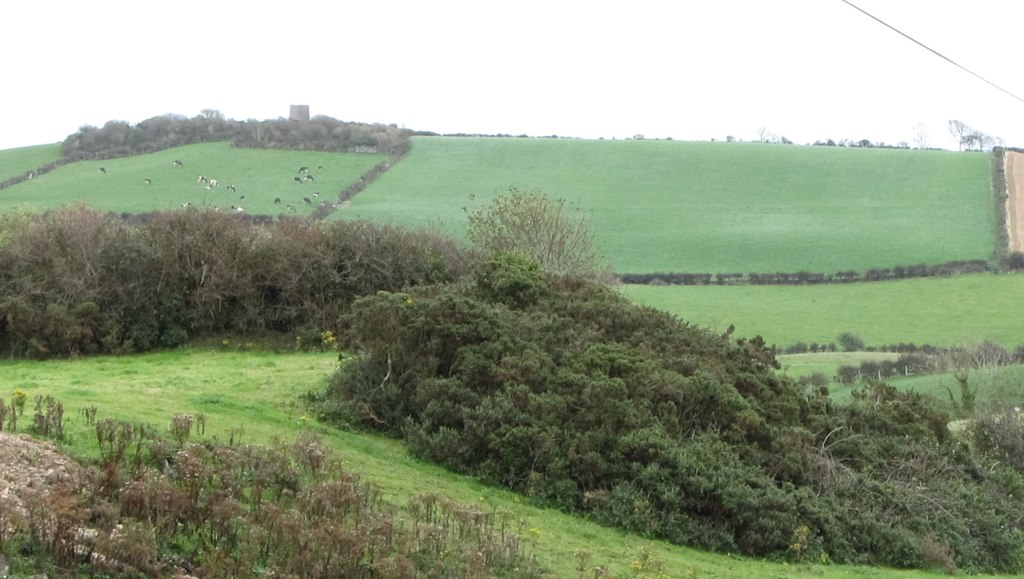
Ballydargan windmill on hilltop

Ballydargan's windmill and surrounding demesne served both agricultural and functional roles. Before chapels were built, Mass was held at discreet locations like the Mass Rock and the Quarry at Green Road, with guards stationed at elevated sites, such as at Ballydargan Mill, to warn of approaching priest-hunters.

=== Ballynoe stone circle ===
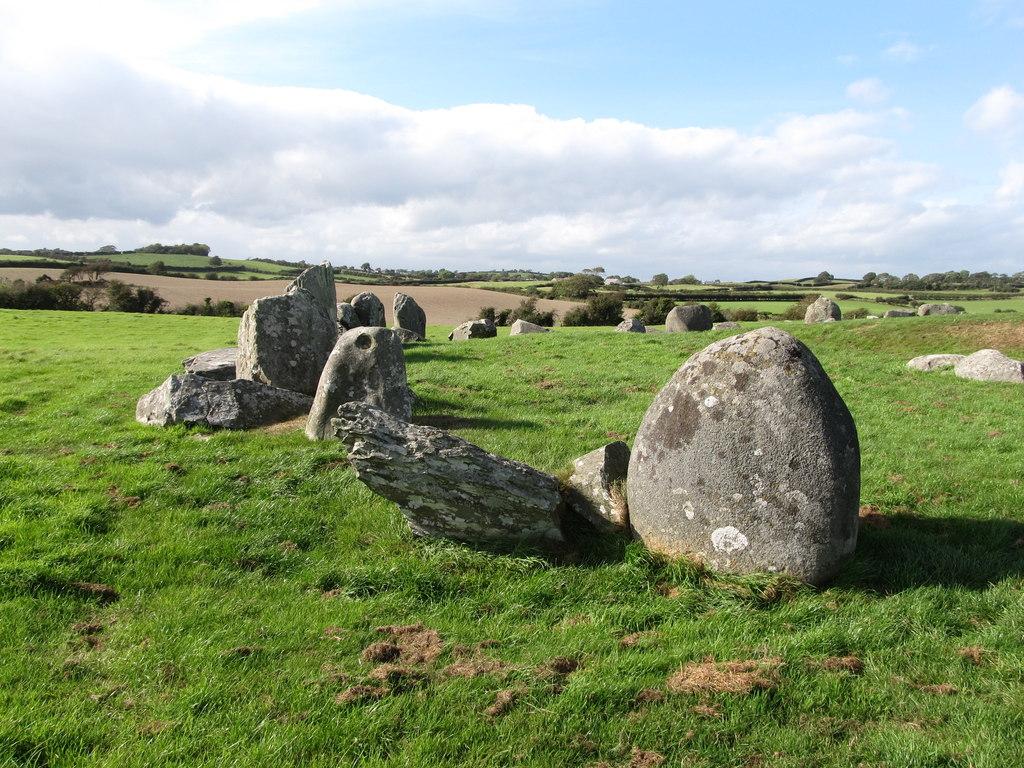
Ballynoe stone circle

Located near the village of Ballynoe within Bright civil parish, Ballynoe stone circle dates to the late Neolithic and Early Bronze Age. It features over 50 monoliths of Ordovician gritstone and granites and has been linked to solar alignments and ancient burial practices. Excavations in the 1930s revealed burial cists and a long mound within the circle. The site is mentioned in the Tochmarc Étaíne, an early Irish mythological text.

=== Castle Skreen ===
Situated on a drumlin, this site features a circular earthwork likely dating to the early medieval period and a 15th-century tower house. Excavations at Castleskreen in the 1950s uncovered evidence of intermittent occupation from the first millennium AD, including domestic debris, pottery, and a man-made central hollow possibly used for livestock. Although the tower house and enclosure may not have been used simultaneously, soil studies revealed multiple phases of abandonment and reuse.

=== Erenagh Abbey ===
Also known as Carrig (or Carryke), the ancient abbey was founded in 1127 by Niall Mac Dunlevi, king of Ulster, and became the first abbey in Ireland of a monastic order recognised by Rome. Initially affiliated with the Savigniac order, it later joined the Cistercian Order as a daughter house of Furness Abbey in England, but was destroyed by John de Courcy in 1177. In 2025, archaeologists uncovered structural remains and artifacts near Ballynoe stone circle, believed to be the lost site of Erenagh Abbey.

=== Former Ballynoe railway station ===
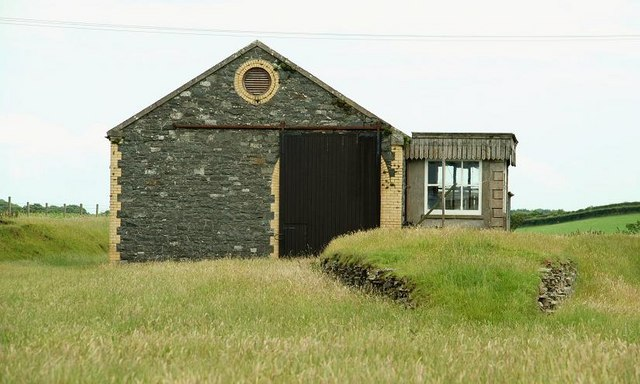
Former Ballynoe railway station building

Now disused, Ballynoe railway station was part of the Belfast and County Down Railway which connected Downpatrick to Ardglass. The station building, signal box, and goods shed are still standing and have been converted into private properties. While the original brickwork and structure are largely intact, the signal box is in need of repair. The platforms and their canopies are no longer present, but remnants of the platform edges can still be found in some areas.

=== Mass rock at Coniamstown ===
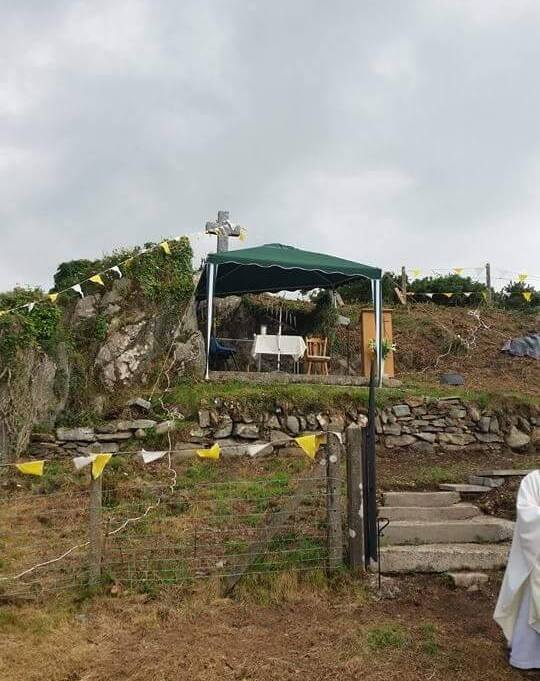
Mass rock at Coniamstown

During the Penal times in Ireland, Catholics worshipped at a Mass Rock located at the start of Twelve Acre Lane in Coniamstown. The surrounding hills (e.g. Ballydargan windmill) served as natural lookouts for approaching patrols. This site became a place of worship after the old chapel had fallen into ruin.

=== Rath in Castleskreen ===
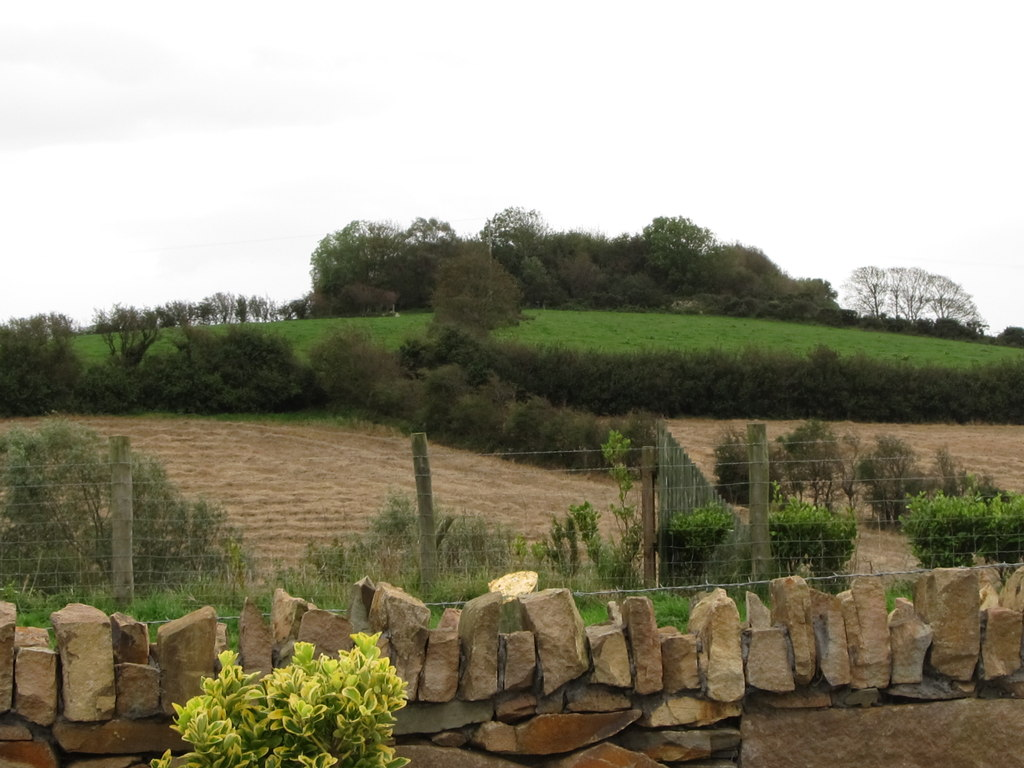
Hilltop rath in Castleskreen

The hilltop rath at Castleskreen was excavated between 1952 and 1955, revealing a multi-phase site that evolved from a simple circular enclosure to a fortified settlement and later included a motte. Artifacts recovered, ranging from souterrain ware and iron tools to Anglo-Norman pottery and a silver coin, indicate occupation from early medieval times into the 13th century.

=== St. Finian's Well ===
A natural spring, traditionally associated with Saint Finian, lies approximately 350 yards northwest of the medieval Abbey of Carryke (Erenagh Abbey). It is formed in a hollow in the bedrock and faced with stone masonry. Local tradition holds that the well bears the imprint of Saint Finian's knees and feet on a stone slab. Historian Ann Hamlin believes this may indicate an earlier monastic settlement at Erenagh, predating Carryke Abbey’s foundation in 1127. Its location near medieval harbours and pilgrimage routes suggests it served both the abbey and traveling pilgrims.

== Sport ==
=== Gaelic football ===
The local Gaelic football team, Bright GFC, was established in 1951. The club's colours are green and gold and its main grounds are located on Ballynoe Road in Marshallstown, near Carney Hill. The club's clubhouse doubles as the local community centre.

== Townlands ==
Bright civil parish contains the following townlands:

Townland	Irish Name	Translation	Area (acres)	Brief History	Notes
Ballycam	An Baile Cam	‘the crooked townland’	308.86	May have come from its irregular geographical shape; was called Ballyvickany in 1637.	There is another Ballycam in Ballyphilip parish, Ards Peninsula.
Ballydargan	Baile Dheargáin	also known as Baile Ui-Deargain, O'Dargan's town	421.51	In the late 18th century 30–40 tons of lead ore were extracted, a windmill ruin was also once used for drying grain then.	Oakley Park was once a wooded estate (called a demesne) covering over 104 acres.
Ballygallum	Baile Ó gColaim	‘townland of the O’Collums’	164.82	Recorded in historical documents as Ballyogalme in 1549, Balliogalline in 1603, and Ballygallin or Ballygallind in 1632	Ó Colaim is a variant of the surname Mac Colaim (MacCollum), historically found in Ulster counties such as Antrim, Tyrone, and Donegal.
Ballygilbert	Baile Ghilbeirt	‘Gilbert’s townland’; earlier Eng. Gilberton 'Gilbert's town'	273.47	Recorded as Gilberton in 1427, reflecting its origin as a Gaelicised form of an Anglo-Norman place-name	Other townlands with the same name exist in the parishes of Bangor and Carncastle
Ballylig	Baile an Loig	‘townland of the hollow’	255.89	The townland of Ballylig was recorded as Ballylegan in 1549 and as Ballyalugg or Ballenlugg in 1637.	
Ballynagallagh	Baile na gCailleach	‘townland of the nuns’	185.89	In 1427, the townland was recorded as Nuntoun and identified as property of the prioress and convent of the Blessed Mary of Down in Downpatrick.	Stone-lined graves were also discovered in Ballynagallagh.
Ballynoe	an Baile Nua	'the new settlement'	207.37	Ballynoe was the site of an early church known as Kilschaelyn and in ruins by 1622.	A stone monument with a Norman sword and cross design was discovered here, and the area may have been on a route taken by St. Patrick.
Ballyviggis	Baile Bhigis	‘Bigges’s townland’	135.13	Recorded as terrae de Ballybeghys in 1305, Balliviger in 1549, and Ballyviges in 1618.	Possibly a Gaelicised form of an English name such as Bigg, Bigge(s), or de Bigges, though the exact origin remains uncertain.
Bright	Breachtán	‘speckled or variegated place’	341.71	Early references to the name appear in the 9th-century Tripartite Life of Saint Patrick as Mrechtan and in the 14th-century Lebar Brecc as Brectain.	The present Church of Ireland church in the townland of Bright occupies the site of the medieval parish church and also of an earlier church.
Carrowbane	An Cheathrú Bhán	‘the white quarter’	217.67	Recorded in 1768 as Carubane, with later spellings including Carrabane (1790) and Carabane (1810)	Carrowbane Mountain is located in the eastern part of the townland.
Castleskreen	Caisteal Críon	‘old or decayed castle’	335.96	Originally the site of a tower house built on an earlier Irish rath, with the name first recorded as Grenecastell in 1333	A Norman stronghold and a nearby chapel recorded in the early 14th and 15th centuries
Coniamstown	Baile an Choiniamaigh	possibly from John de Balicoingham, rector of Ardquin.	426.95	Ruins of medieval chapels, a Mass rock from Penal times, and remnants of a Norman motte and bailey castle.	The townland includes wetlands, remnants of a 1950s railway line, and was once home to an early Christian monastery and a hospital for the infirm known locally as Straney’s Spital.
Crolly's Quarter		Crolly's (surname) + Eng. quarter	51.75	First documented in 1830 in the Ordnance Survey Name Book	The Crolly family once held estates in Lecale under the Earls of Kildare, with George Crolly, who died in 1780, noted as the last Baron Crolly.
Erenagh	An Oireanach	‘the cultivated place’	386.14	Referred to as Erynach in a 12th-century record from Furness Abbey, which states that an abbey was founded there in 1127 near St Finian's Well.	The abbey, known as the Abbey of Carrick, was a rare daughter house (under the spiritual or administrative authority) of an English monastery established before the arrival of John de Courcy in 1177. Though no remains survive, the well still exists near the southern boundary of the townland.
Grangewalls		Eng. grange + walls or Walls (surname)	527.39	Recorded as Grange Awales in 1618, Grangewalls in 1637, and Grange Walls in 1729.	The term grange comes from Norman French and refers to a monastic farm, and Grangewalls was noted in 1830 as a possession of the nearby monastery of Saul.
Island Henry		Eng. island + Henry (forename/surname)	17.45	Surrounded by townland Strand, was first recorded by name in 1755	Despite its name, the term island refers to a small area of raised land rather than a coastal island. The origin of the name Henry in this context is unknown.
Kilbride	Cill Bhríde	‘(Saint) Brigid’s church’	241.48	Recorded as Kilbride in Lethcathel in 1168 and as Capella de Kilbride around 1306, referring to an early church once located there	Although no remains of the church survive today, it was reportedly removed in 1830, and the surrounding field was known as "the Church Park". Stone-lined graves were found at the site.
Legamaddy	Lag an Mhadaidh	"hollow of the dog."	211.59	Known as Carrowmalt in the 17th century; a small lake nearby may relate to its name meaning.	St. Patrick’s Catholic Church, built in 1865 to replace an older chapel in Coniamstown, stands as a key landmark in the townland.
Lisoid	Lios Fhóid	‘fort of the sod, land or territory’	280.98	Recorded under various names from 1333 to 1661, including Balyalghan, Ballygallaghan, and Ballygullaghan alias Lyode	One fort is recorded in the townland
Strand		Eng. strand 'shore, beach'	347.69	First recorded in 1710 as Strand of Killough	The name likely refers to the mud flats along the western side of Killough Bay, although the townland now lies slightly inland. A small lake named Strand Lough is located on its eastern boundary.
Tullinespick	Tulaigh an Easpaig	‘hillock of the bishop’	50.03	Recorded as Byscopille in 1305, meaning "Bishop’s Hill."	In 1622, it was listed as church land and remained under the ownership of the Protestant bishop until the Church of Ireland was disestablished in 1869. A cemetery surrounded by a now nearly vanished rath was once visible in the townland.
Whigamstown		Sc./Northern Eng. W(h)igham's (surname) + town	150.13	Recorded as Whetbyton in 1427 and as Wigham’s town in 1770	A Northumbrian and Scottish variant of the English habitation name Wickham, which comes from Old English and means "settlement".

== See also ==
- List of civil parishes of County Down
- The Dialects of Old Irish: A Deep Dive into a Linguistic Mosaic. Brehon Academy. Accessed 10 July 2025. "Bérla Féini: The Language of Law and Tradition."
