= Coniamstown =

Townland in County Down, Ireland

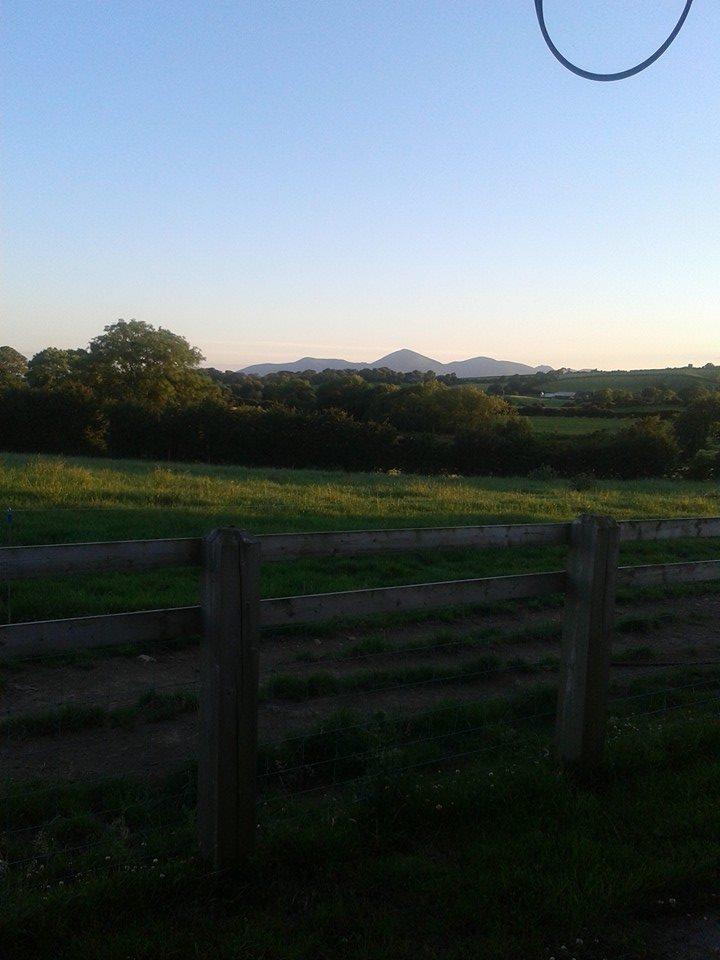
View from the road

Coniamstown townland lies in upper Lecale and is part of the civil parish of Bright, County Down in Northern Ireland. It occupies 426 acres with three roads, the main Coniamstown Road leads from the old course to the castle at the top of Bright hill. Within County Down, it is the 587th largest townland.

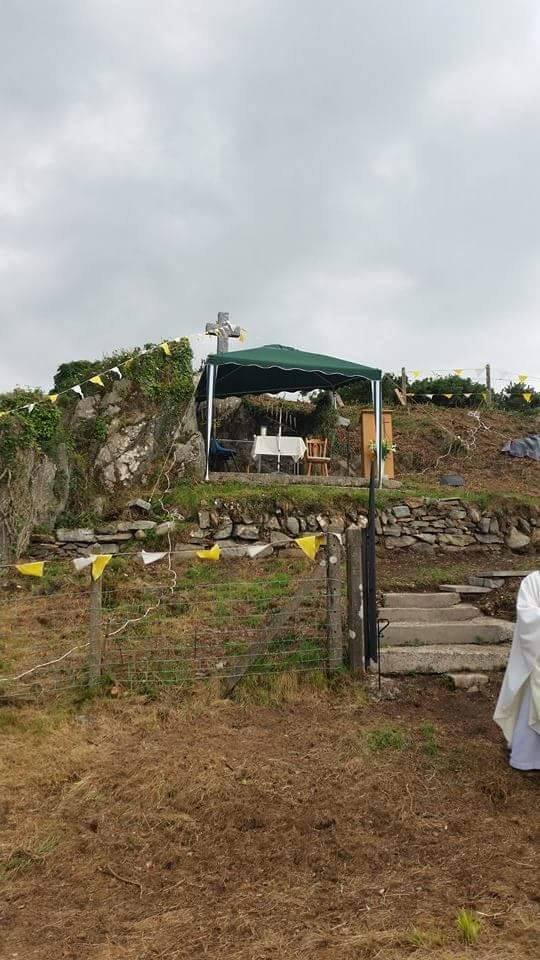
Mass rock in Coniamstown

== History ==
Coniamstown translates to Baile an Choiniamaigh in Irish, the area is believed to get its name from John de Balicoingham, rector of Ardquin. He was elected to the seat of Down in 1328 and was sent by the Pope to County Cork in 1330. The area retained his name thereafter.

The townland has a least two ruined chapels. The medieval chapel was located at the end of the avenue leading to Coniamstown House. It is recorded as Capella de Baliconyngham in the Papal Taxation of c.1306. No traces of it are visible from the ground however it can be seen in satellite imagery. It was built sometime in the 1200s or before. It was in complete ruin by 1622. A graveyard is present and quantities of human bones have been found there along with headstones. A hospital for the infirm there was mentioned in the margin of the original roll of Pope Nicholas's Taxation 1291. Its presence is indicated by the local term, Straney's Spital. It was named after the Straney family, while 'spital' derives from the Irish word for hospital. This area is located near the border with the townland of Grangecam and the former race course.

Sometime after the old chapel had fallen to ruin, the Penal laws were introduced to Ireland, and a Mass rock at the start of the twelve acre lane was used where Catholics worshiped during the Penal times, where the surrounding hills provided lookouts to spot patrols. The priest in 1704 was Rev. Seneca or Jenkin Smith and in 1768 was Rev. Magnus Grant.

A new chapel was erected in Coniamstown about 1745, replaced by a better chapel in 1796. In 1836 it was described as having no seats, but could accommodate 400 people. It was built in a T shape. It was located on the twelve acre lane near the border of the townland of Whigamstown in an area now called the Chapel field. The chapel was replaced by a new chapel in Legamaddy by Rev. Richard Killen. The foundation stone was laid 27 Aug 1862 and consecrated on 22 Oct 1865 by Dr. Denvir. That day's sermon was preached by Dr. Dorrian. It is in Gothic style, designed by John O'Neill, a Belfast architect.

The area was once home to a motte and bailey castle. The exact date of its construction is unknown. The large mound of the bailey remains visible. The castle was located on the site of Coniamstown House. The Normans built fortresses all over Ireland beginning around 1169. John De Courcey reached Downpatrick around 1176. The Normans may have built the castle to protect their supply lines to the coast not long after 1176. The castle was likely abandoned before the more imposing stone castle was built on top of Bright Hill in the late 15th century.

A field in the area around Conaimstown House was home to an early Christian monastery, most likely built around the 7th century. A communal fire/charcoal production was located in one of the nearby bogs.

The train from Downpatrick that used to run through the townland closed in the 1950s. Markers and bridges of the old line remain.

== Agriculture ==
Potatoes, turnips, kale, hay and silage are grown there. Cattle and sheep are farmed. Wetlands are common, fed by many small rivers, supporting wildlife and birds.
