= Lecale Upper =

Barony in County Down, Northern Ireland

Lecale Upper Leath Cathail Uachtarach(Irish)
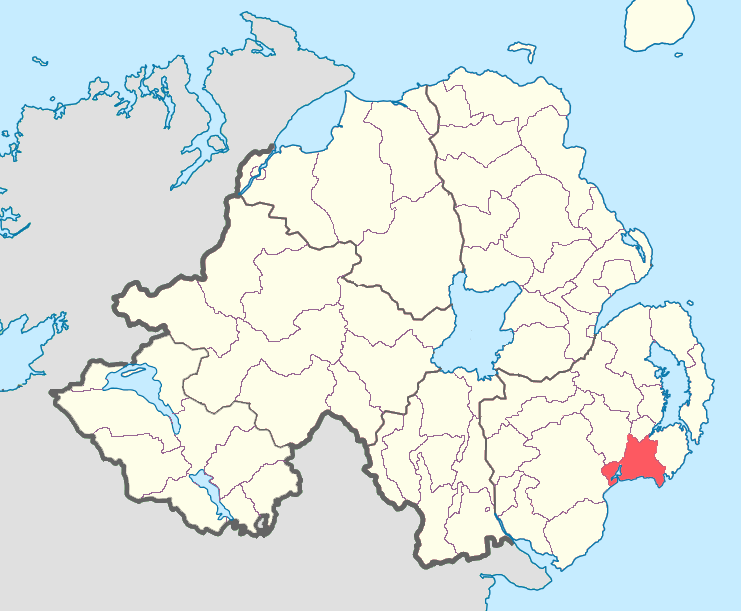
- Location of Lecale Upper, County Down, Northern Ireland.
- Sovereign state: United Kingdom
- Country: Northern Ireland
- County: Down

Lecale Upper (named after the former barony of Lecale) is a barony in County Down, Northern Ireland. To its south lies the Irish Sea, and it is bordered by three other baronies; Lecale Lower and Kinelarty to the north; and Iveagh Upper, Lower Half to the west.

== History ==
The Mac Duinnshéibhe (MacDunleavy, Dunleavy) sept where a royal dynasty of Dál Fiatach in Ulaid and are noted in this area. John de Courcy in the 12th century would drive them out of Ulaid from where they fled to County Donegal, Republic of Ireland.

The Russells of Downpatrick can trace their Norman heritage back to the 12th century having been recorded in the area since Osberto Russell accompanied John de Courcy in 1177 into Ulster.

The barony of Lecale Upper was created in 1851 when the barony of Lecale was split into two, the other part being Lecale Lower.

== List of settlements ==
Below is a list of the towns and villages in Lecale Upper:

=== Towns ===
- Downpatrick

=== Villages ===
- Ballykinler
- Dundrum
- Killough

== List of civil parishes ==
Below is a list of civil parishes in Lecale Upper:

- Ballee (one townland, rest in barony of Lecale Lower)
- Ballykinler
- Bright
- Down
- Kilclief (also partly in barony of Lecale Lower)
- Kilmegan (also partly in baronies of Iveagh Upper, Lower Half and Kinelarty)
- Rathmullan (also partly in barony of Lecale Lower (one townland))
- Tyrella
