= Downpatrick, Killough and Ardglass Railway =

Railway line in Northern Ireland

The Downpatrick, Killough and Ardglass Railway (DKALR) was an Irish gauge (1,600 mm (5 ft 3 in)) railway in Ireland linking Downpatrick with Ardglass. The company was incorporated on 29 November 1890 by the Downpatrick, Killough, and Ardglass Light Railway Order 1890, obtained under the Light Railways (Ireland) Act 1889. It was in effect a subsidiary of the Belfast and County Down Railway who were to build and operate it. The line found itself under the control of the Ulster Transport Authority and was closed on 16 January 1950.

This minor extension of the company’s railway network ultimately proved underwhelming in terms of operational success. The line passed through a sparsely populated region, and aside from limited seasonal tourist excursions and fish transport, its primary freight commodity was potatoes. In an effort to boost potato shipments, reduced through rates were introduced. However, this strategy failed to counter the growing trend of direct maritime potato exports from the ports of Killough, Ardglass, and Dundrum, which continued to increase between 1890 and 1910.

Although fish transport saw a notable rise during the same period, the volume remained insufficient to make the line financially viable. Preferential through rates were offered for fish bound for major English markets, along with discounted rates to Belfast, where most of the catch was sold to local retailers. Despite these measures and the corresponding growth in fish freight, the line consistently operated at a financial loss.

The Downpatrick–Ardglass branch of the Belfast and County Down Railway (BCDR) remained in service until the broader closure of the county’s railway infrastructure in 1950. Its construction and prolonged operation—despite persistently low traffic volumes—represented a long-term financial burden for the railway company. The line’s establishment was made possible by substantial financial subsidies from the British Government, reflecting an official initiative to support the anticipated expansion of the fishing industry and to stimulate economic development in a geographically isolated area.

The continued operation of the branch line, despite its chronic revenue deficits, can be partly attributed to the BCDR’s progressive transport policy, which prioritized maintaining services in regions where there was a reasonable expectation of future traffic growth.

== History ==
A modest but particularly interesting goods traffic was operating on a section of the BCDR system around 1905 - fish from Ardglass was being transported by rail to Belfast via Downpatrick. The single-track line from Ardglass to Downpatrick, measuring 7¾ miles in length, had been constructed between 1890 and 1892 as one of the "Balfour" lines under the Light Railways (Ireland) Act 1889.

Various estimates had been made regarding the cost of construction. The original proposal was for a narrow-gauge line costing approximately £50,000, with the Treasury contributing a free grant of £30,000 and the County guaranteeing interest at 3% per annum on £17,000. The Belfast and County Down Railway Company was to supply the remaining capital and oversee the construction of the extension.

On 29 November 1890, the construction of the Downpatrick, Killough and Ardglass Railway by the BCDR was officially sanctioned through an Order in Council, and work was set to begin immediately.

After careful deliberation, the BCDR directors opted to build the line to standard gauge:

"...believing that to act otherwise would have been detrimental to the best interests of the line, as all traffic would have required trans-shipment at Downpatrick station..."

However, this decision meant that the additional cost of constructing a standard gauge line, as opposed to narrow gauge, had to be borne by the railway company. The Allport Commission of 1888 had estimated the cost of a standard gauge line—of which they were strongly in favour at approximately £38,000, or £4,900 per mile. In reality, the engineering works exceeded £60,000 (equivalent to approximately £8.24 million in 2023). The BCDR not only contributed a significant portion of this amount but also provided all locomotives, rolling stock, and terminal facilities.

The £17,000 in baronial guaranteed shares were issued at 88, yielding £14,960. Combined with the Treasury grant of £30,000, this still left over £15,000 to be covered by the railway company.

The Downpatrick–Ardglass extension, passing through Ballynoe, Killough, and Coney Island, opened for fish traffic on 31 May 1892 and for passenger traffic on 8 July. The railway company undertook the construction directly, rather than contracting it out, and the route differed from that originally proposed to the Allport Commission. It featured significantly improved gradients and followed the natural contours of the land more closely than other sections of the system, minimizing the need for extensive cuttings and embankments.

A tramway was constructed beginning at the end of the railway line and extended to a point near the northeast end of Ardglass Harbour Pier. The entire route lay within the townland and parish of Ardglass, or possibly just outside the parish boundaries, all located in County Down. The tramway ran along or close to Downpatrick Road, Bath Street, and Quay Street, continuing along the harbour to the pier.

The total construction cost included £7,550 for working stock and an extension to the harbour at Ardglass, bringing the total length of the line to 8 miles and 4 chains. The entire route was built to standard gauge, with rails weighing 80 pounds per yard.

At the time of the Downpatrick–Ardglass line’s construction, a loop line was also built across the marshes in the Quoile estuary, about a mile southwest of Downpatrick. This allowed through trains between Belfast and Newcastle to bypass the county town for the first time since the completion of the main line in 1869.

== Gallery ==
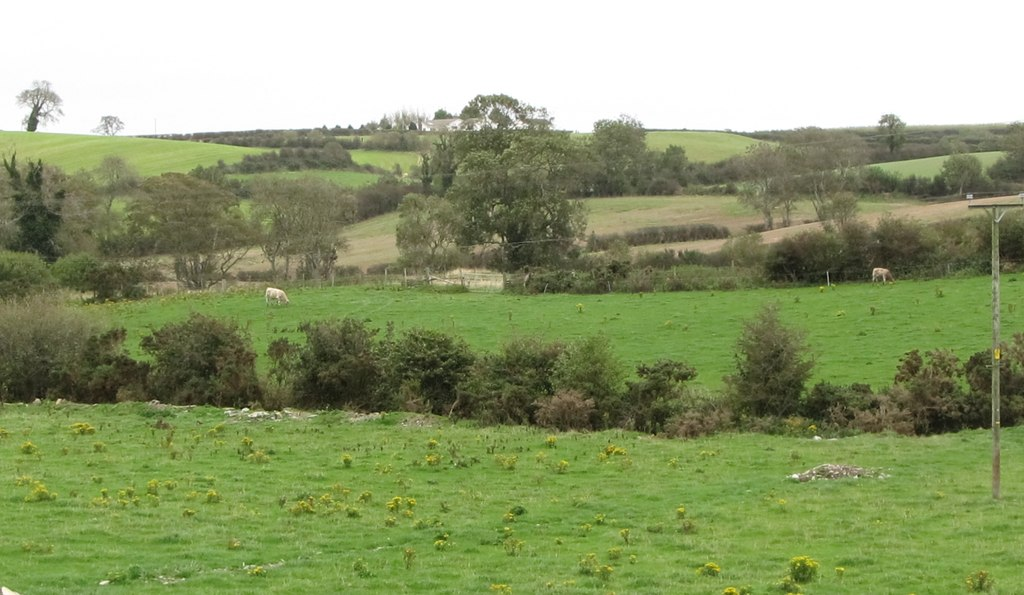
View eastwards across the valley floor towards the abandoned Railway Line (2011)

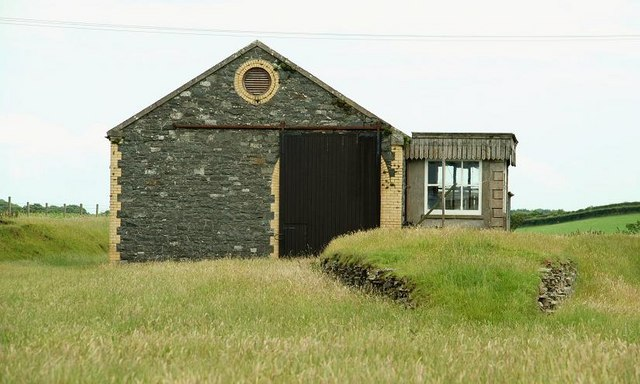
Former Ballynoe station near Downpatrick

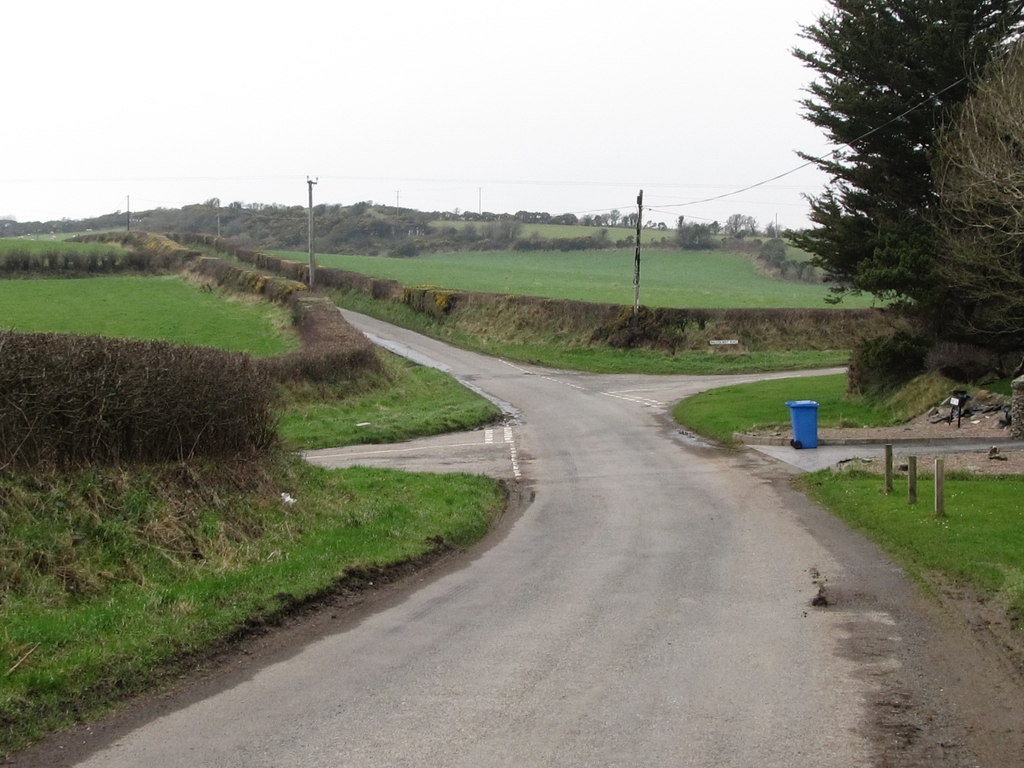
Approximate site of the Bright Halt
(Ballygilbert crossroads)

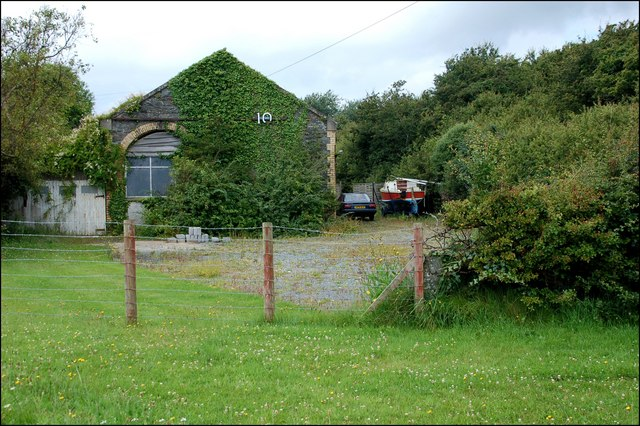
Old railway station at Killough (2007)

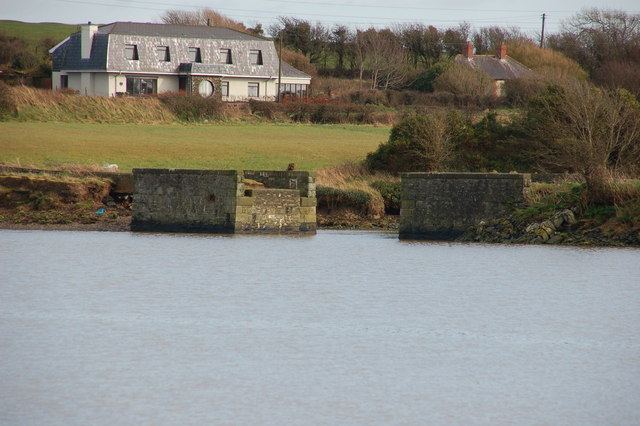
Old railway bridge at Coney Island Halt

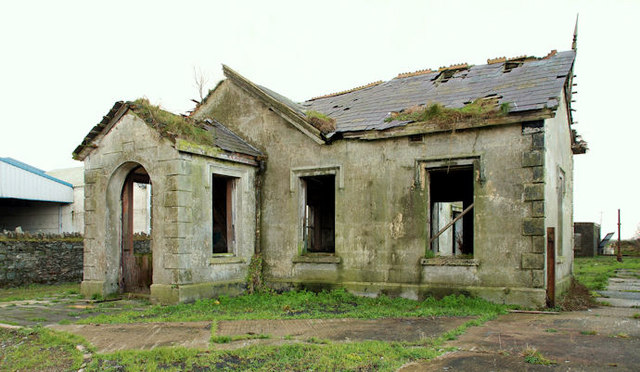
Remains of Ardglass railway station

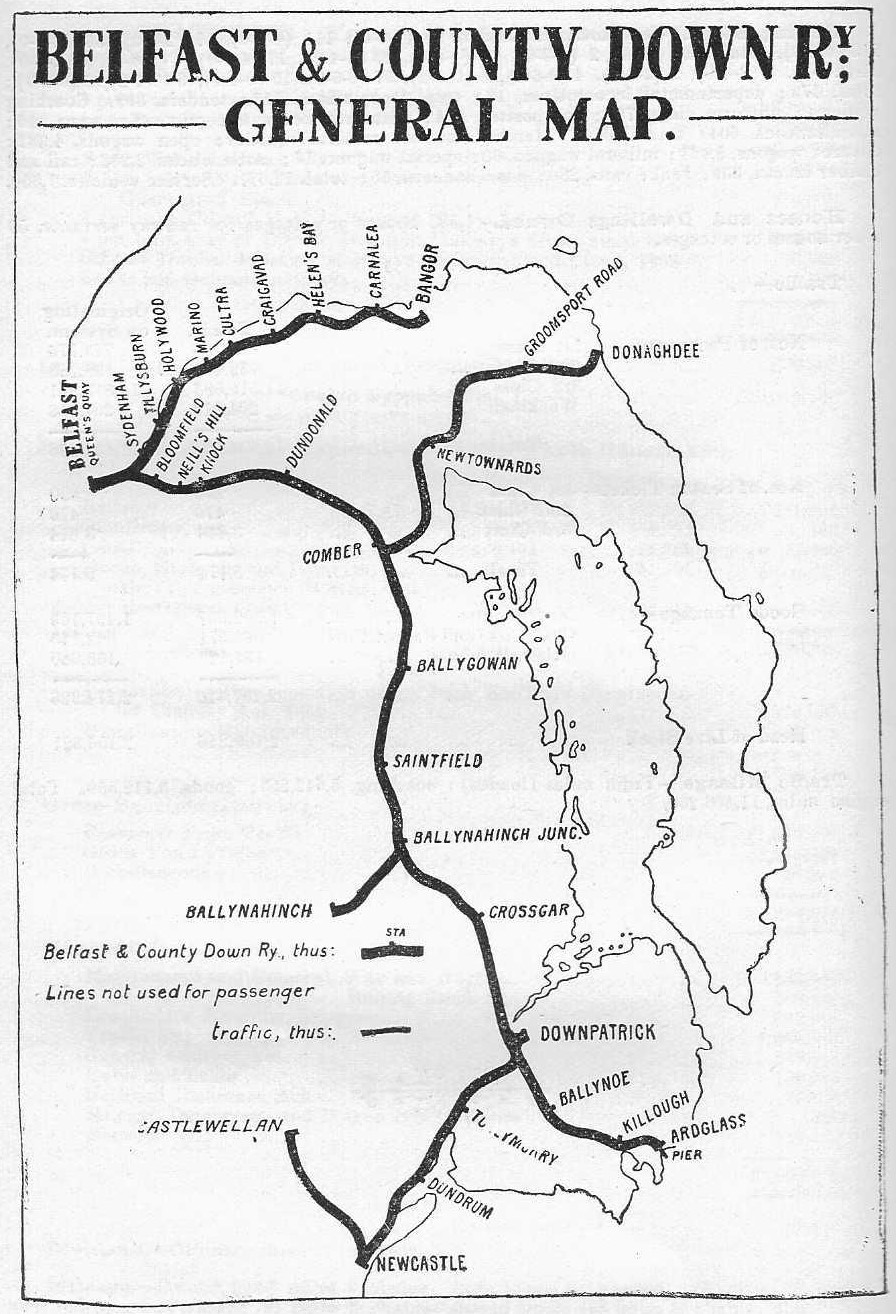
Map of Belfast & County Down Railway 1926
