= Ballynoe railway station =

Railway station in Ballynoe, County Down, Northern Ireland

Former Ballynoe Railway Station
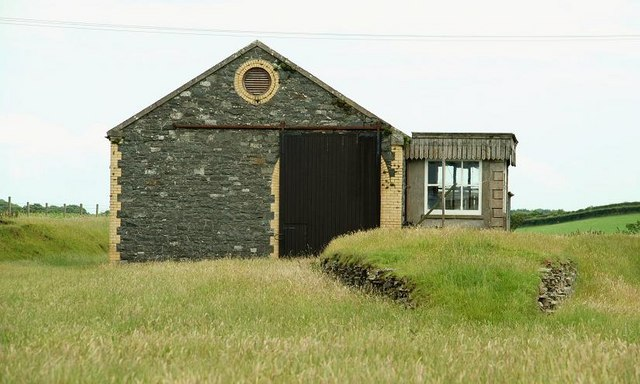
- Former goods shed at Ballynoe railway station and remains of platform (July 2008 by Albert Bridge)

General information
- Location: Ballynoe, County Down; Northern Ireland
- Coordinates: 54°18′00″N 5°42′00″W
- Lines: Downpatrick, Killough, and Ardglass
- Distance: 8 miles, 4 chains
- Connections: Downpatrick Loop Platform→Ballynoe station→Bright Halt

Construction
- Architect: George Culverwell (Chief engineer)

Other information
- Status: Disused

History
- Original company: Downpatrick, Killough and Ardglass Railway
- Pre-grouping: Belfast and County Down Railway
- Post-grouping: Great Northern Railway (Ireland)

Key dates
- 31 May 1892: Station opens (for fish traffic)
- 8 Jul 1892: Opened to passengers
- 12 Oct 1925: Bright Halt added
- 1929: Coney Island Halt added
- 16 Jan 1950: Station closes
Location
- Location within County Down Location within island of Ireland

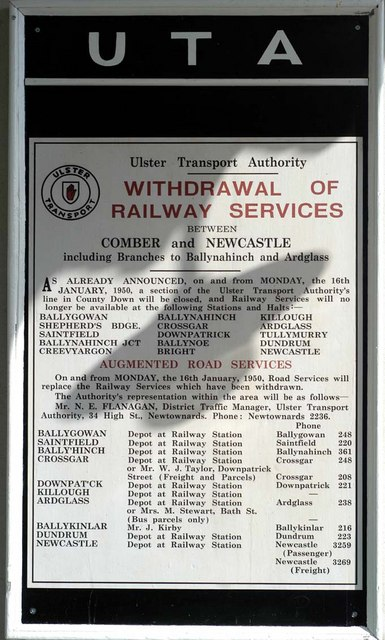
A copy of the original withdrawal notice that was posted at the original Downpatrick station

Ballynoe railway station was on the Downpatrick, Killough and Ardglass Railway, which ran from Downpatrick to Ardglass in County Down, Northern Ireland. The station building, signal box, and goods shed remain standing and have been converted to private ownership. The original brickwork and structure are mostly preserved, though the signal box requires urgent repairs. The platforms and their canopies are no longer present, but traces of the platform edge can still be seen in some areas.

== History ==
The railway branch extended eight miles from Downpatrick South Junction to Ardglass. It was classified as a "Balfour Line", named after Arthur James Balfour, who held the position of Chief Secretary for Ireland between 1887 and 1891 before becoming Prime Minister of the United Kingdom. Balfour played a pivotal role in the passage of the Light Railways (Ireland) Act 1889, which enabled state funding to support the expansion of rail infrastructure, particularly in economically underdeveloped regions. While most of these lines were constructed in western Ireland, the Ardglass branch was the only one established in what is now Northern Ireland. Its primary aim was to bolster the local herring trade, which was believed to be constrained by the lack of direct railway access to Ardglass Harbour.

Opened by the Downpatrick, Killough and Ardglass Railway, it became part of the Belfast and County Down Railway (BCDR). The line was begun in 1890 with the granting of the Downpatrick, Killough, and Ardglass Light Railway Order 1890, obtained under the Light Railways (Ireland) Act 1899. The line was constructed under the management of the BCDR's chief engineer Sir John Macneill.

It began operations in 1892, with stations established at the Downpatrick racecourse, Ballynoe, Killough, and Ardglass. Later on, halts were added at Bright on 12 October 1925 and four years later at Coney Island in 1929.The Loop Platform, a heritage-listed structure and the only original building still standing in Downpatrick, constructed in 1893, was well known for the porters' shouts of "All change for Ballynoe, Killough, and Ardglass".

From an engineering perspective, the line was notably steep by the standards of County Down. It included a sustained incline of 1 in 50 approaching Ballynoe, followed by a comparable descent. The railway company undertook the construction of the line independently, without engaging an external contractor. To minimize the need for extensive excavation and embankment work, the alignment was carefully designed to adhere more closely to the natural contours of the terrain—far more so than other segments of the railway network. Initially, the single-track route was divided into two operational segments, managed using the staff and ticket system. This arrangement remained in place until 1926, when the signal box at Ballynoe was decommissioned, consolidating the line into a single operational section. The station closed to passengers in 1950, by which time it had been taken over by the Great Northern Railway (Ireland) (GNRI) which dissolved in 1958 and its assets were split between:

- Ulster Transport Authority (Northern Ireland).
- Córas Iompair Éireann (Republic of Ireland)

== Routes ==
It used to be cheaper to buy two separate tickets—one from Newtownards to Downpatrick and another from Downpatrick to Killough—than to buy a return ticket straight to Killough. A third-class return ticket from Newtownards to Killough cost 2 shillings and 6 pence. But if you bought a return ticket to Downpatrick for 1 shilling and 6 pence, and then a return ticket from Downpatrick to Killough for 7 pence, it added up to less. A specimen timetable from April 1940 has also been published.

The following diagram shows the heritage railway line operated by the Downpatrick and County Down Railway:

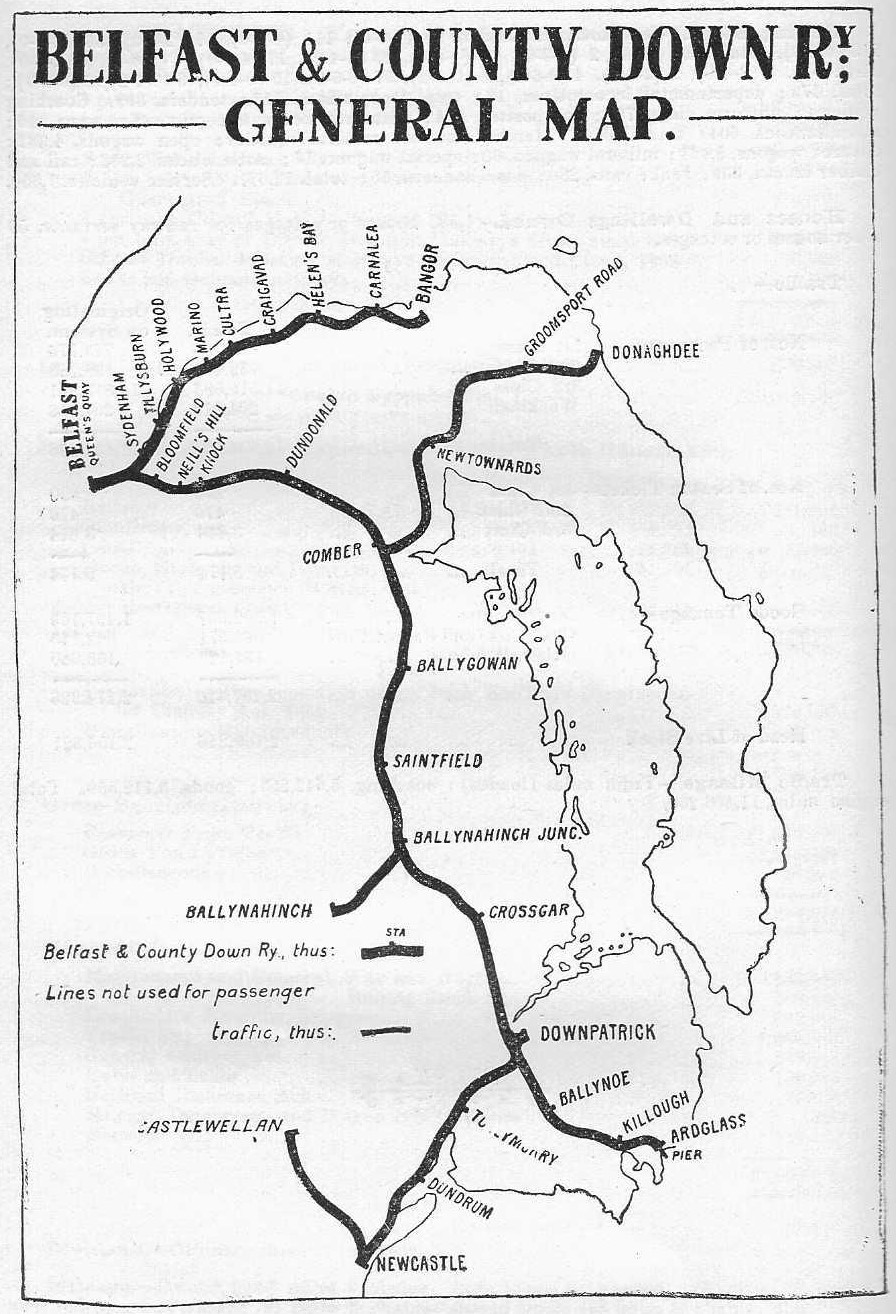
Map of Belfast & County Down Railway 1926

== Features ==
=== Level crossing keeper's cottage ===
When the station was operational the trains crossed the Ballynoe road through a level crossing with two sets of double gates. At Ballynoe it fell to the station master's wife to man the gates, arising in the early morning to let the first train into the station and staying on duty until late at night. The cottage has been uninhabited since the mid-1980s and even then would have been something of a time capsule. A range, a Belfast sink and an old milk bottle are all still in situ.

=== Station building ===
Dating from 1892 the station building is very like that of Ardglass two stations away designed by the BCDR's chief engineer George Culverwell and his assistant a Mr Morris. However, where Ardglass lies in ruins this is much more befitting a piece of the country's built heritage. Much like Killough, one station away, the last station master bought the house from the Ulster Transport Authority when the line closed and it's been in the family ever since. It was extended by the current owner's father although the platforms have been largely dismantled and the track bed filled in.

=== Signal cabin ===
The signal cabin here is one of only three left on the old BCDR network. The others being at Tullymurray and at Saintfield there was one at Killough but sadly it fell victim to rot in 2018 as it was entirely made of wood unlike the others. Sadly, as with all of them except Saintfield, the original signal levers and mechanisms were removed in the 1950s.

=== Goods shed ===
Identical to those at Killough and Ardglass the goods shed was served by its own set of rails that ran right through the shed and connected with the passenger line at either end. The two main commodities that were shipped from here were potatoes and sand from nearby Tyrella beach for the war effort. It apparently wasn't of the best quality but war being what it is, the authorities had to take it. The cattle beach (the area where any livestock was kept awaiting transport) was just behind this building. Adjoining the goods shed is the Ardglass bound waiting room.

== Gallery ==
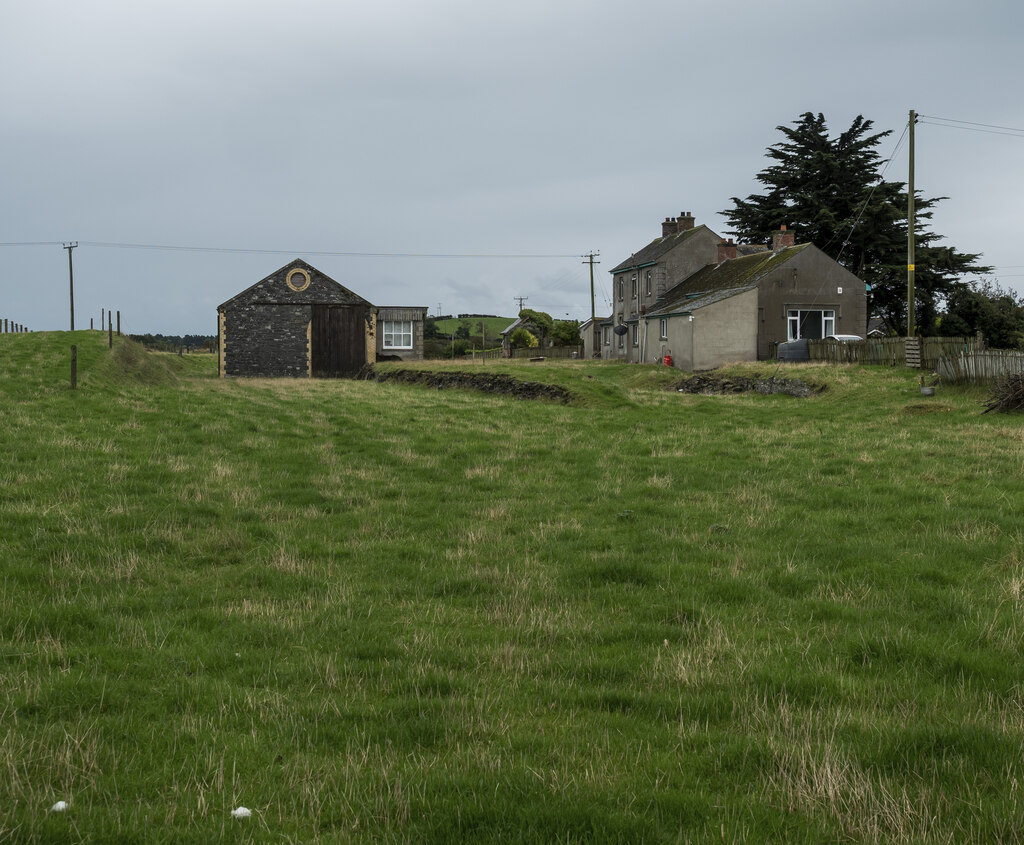
Former Ballynoe Railway Station (2022)

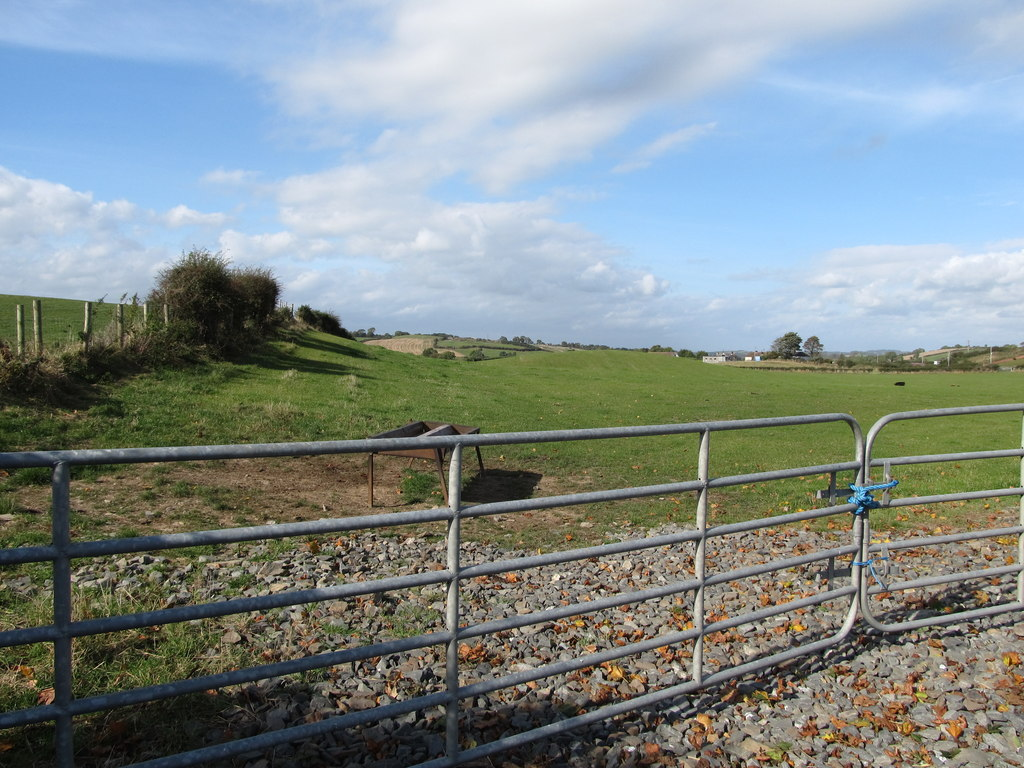
The former track bed of the Downpatrick, Killough and Ardglass Railway west of Ballynoe Road (2014)

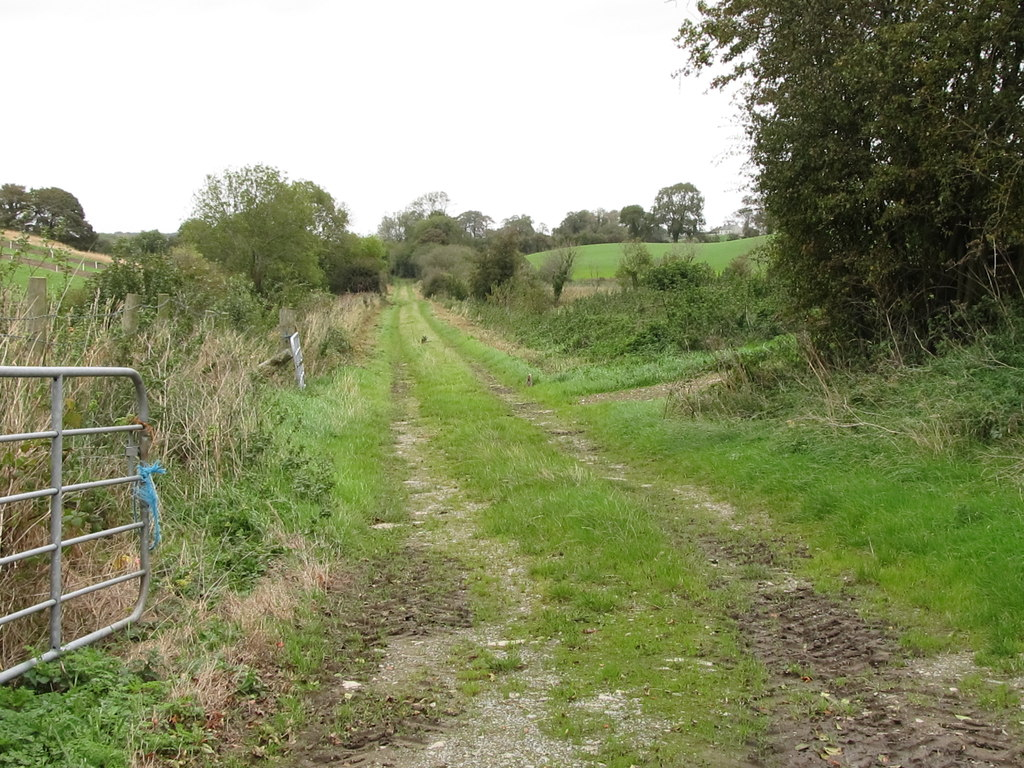
View north along the trackbed of the former Downpatrick to Ardglass Railway (2011)

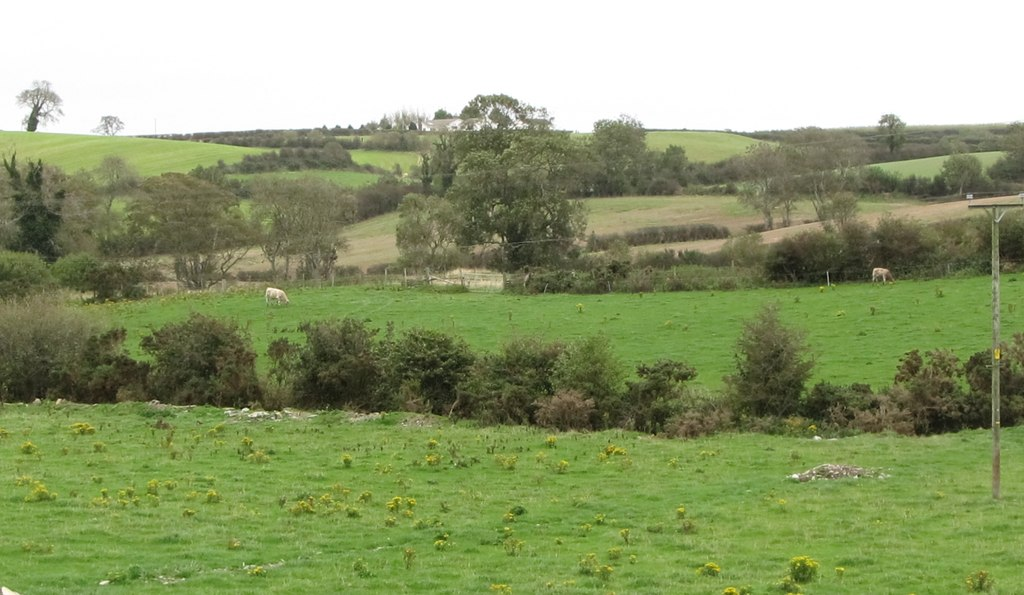
View eastwards across the valley floor towards the abandoned Downpatrick and Ardglass Railway Line (2011)

1906 railway map
