= Ardglass railway station =

Railway station in County Down, Northern Ireland

Ardglass
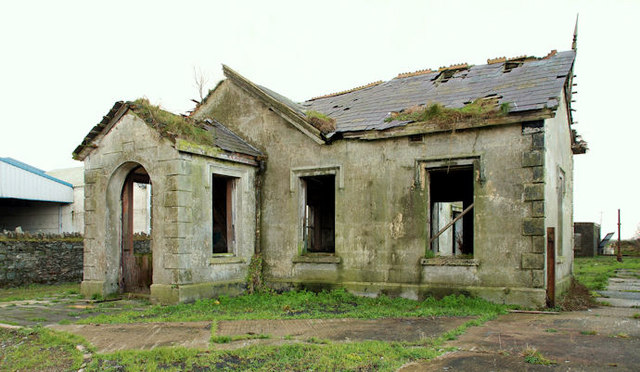
- Remains of the station building

General information
- Location: Ardglass, County Down; Northern Ireland
- Coordinates: 54.263159°N 5.611779°W
- Lines: Downpatrick, Killough, and Ardglass
- Distance: 8 miles, 4 chains
- Connections: Coney Island Halt→Ardglass railway station

Construction
- Architect: George Culverwell (Chief engineer)

Other information
- Status: Disused

History
- Original company: Downpatrick, Killough and Ardglass Railway
- Pre-grouping: Belfast and County Down Railway
- Post-grouping: Great Northern Railway (Ireland)

Key dates
- 31 May 1892: Station opens (for fish traffic)
- 8 Jul 1892: Opened to passengers
- 12 Oct 1925: Bright Halt added
- 1929: Coney Island Halt added
- 16 Jan 1950: Station closes
Location
- Location within County Down Location within island of Ireland

Ardglass railway station was the terminus of the Downpatrick, Killough and Ardglass Railway, which ran from Belfast south to Newcastle, County Down in Northern Ireland.

== History ==
The railway branch extended eight miles from Downpatrick South Junction to Ardglass. It was classified as a "Balfour Line", named after Arthur James Balfour, who held the position of Chief Secretary for Ireland between 1887 and 1891 before becoming Prime Minister of the United Kingdom. Balfour played a pivotal role in the passage of the Light Railways (Ireland) Act 1889, which enabled state funding to support the expansion of rail infrastructure, particularly in economically underdeveloped regions. While most of these lines were constructed in western Ireland, the Ardglass branch was the only one established in what is now Northern Ireland. Its primary aim was to bolster the local herring trade, which was believed to be constrained by the lack of direct railway access to Ardglass Harbour. Freight services, particularly for fish, commenced on 31 May 1892, with passenger operations beginning shortly thereafter on 8 July.

Opened by the Downpatrick, Killough and Ardglass Railway, it became part of the Belfast and County Down Railway (BCDR). The line was begun 1890 with the granting of the Downpatrick, Killough, and Ardglass Light Railway Order 1890, obtained under the Light Railways (Ireland) Act 1889. The line was constructed under the management of the BCDR's chief engineer Sir John Macneill.

It began operations in 1892, with stations established at the Downpatrick racecourse, Ballynoe, Killough, and Ardglass. Later on, halts were added at Bright on 12 Oct 1925 and 4 years later at Coney Island in 1929. A tramway was constructed beginning at the end of the railway line and extended to a point near the northeast end of Ardglass Harbour Pier. The entire route lay within the townland and parish of Ardglass, or possibly just outside the parish boundaries, all located in County Down. The tramway ran along or close to Downpatrick Road, Bath Street, and Quay Street, continuing along the harbour to the pier.

Initially, the single-track route was divided into two operational segments, managed using the staff and ticket system. This arrangement remained in place until 1926, when the signal box at Ballynoe was decommissioned, consolidating the line into a single operational section. The Killough signal box, which had never functioned as a block post, was also closed during this period. By then, the tramway link to Ardglass Harbour had fallen out of use, leaving the branch line reliant solely on local passenger and goods traffic. The station closed to passengers in 1950, by which time it had been taken over by the Ulster Transport Authority.

The station buildings are mostly roofless and derelict in 2017.

Preceding station	Historical railways	Following station
Coney Island	Belfast and County Down Railway; Belfast-Ardglass	Tramway to harbour

== Gallery ==
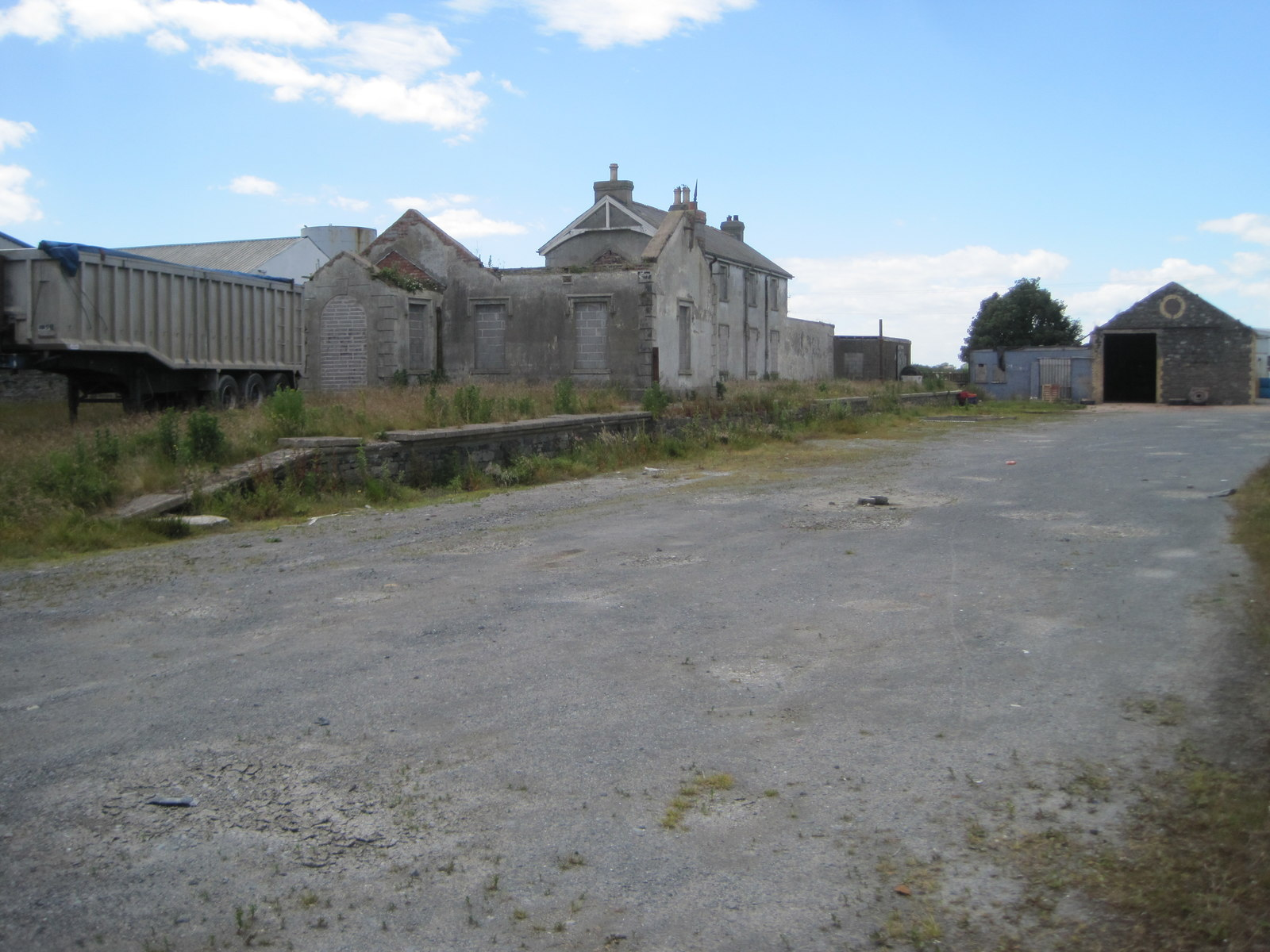
Ardglass
railway station
