= Coney Island railway station =

Former station in Northern Ireland

Former Coney Island Halt
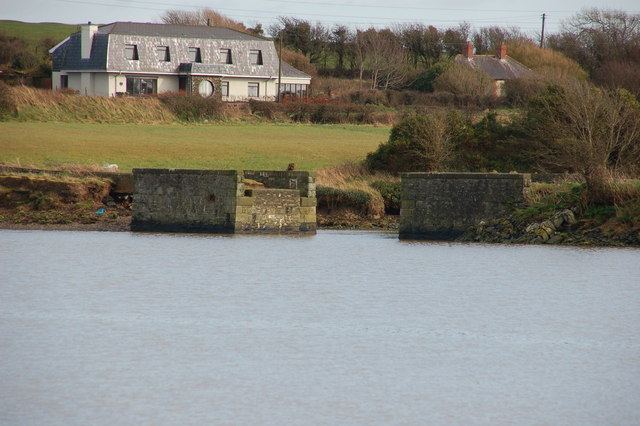
- Old railway bridge at Coney Island

General information
- Location: Coney Island, County Down; Northern Ireland
- Coordinates: type:railwaystation 54.275963°N 5.67579°W
- Lines: Downpatrick, Killough, and Ardglass
- Distance: 8 miles, 4 chains
- Connections: Killough railway station→Coney Island Halt→Ardglass railway station

Construction
- Architect: George Culverwell (Chief engineer)

Other information
- Status: Disused

History
- Original company: Downpatrick, Killough and Ardglass Railway
- Pre-grouping: Belfast and County Down Railway
- Post-grouping: Great Northern Railway (Ireland)

Key dates
- 31 May 1892: Station opens (for fish traffic)
- 8 Jul 1892: Opened to passengers
- 12 Oct 1925: Bright Halt added
- 1929: Coney Island Halt added
- 16 Jan 1950: Station closes
Location
- Location within County Down Location within island of Ireland

Coney Island Halt was on the Downpatrick, Killough and Ardglass Railway, which ran from Downpatrick to Ardglass in Northern Ireland. The former railway embankment traversing the northern extent of Killough Harbour was part of the branch line connecting Downpatrick to Ardglass. This segment of the railway infrastructure used a constructed causeway to span the tidal inlet at the head of the harbour. Subsequently, the line passed beneath Killough Bridge before terminating at Killough Station. The original site of the halt is presently occupied by the Coney Island Caravan Park. A roadway, historically known as Station Road, provided a direct link between Killough village and Coney Island Halt.

== History ==
The railway branch extended eight miles from Downpatrick South Junction to Ardglass. It was classified as a "Balfour Line", named after Arthur James Balfour, who held the position of Chief Secretary for Ireland between 1887 and 1891 before becoming Prime Minister of the United Kingdom. Balfour played a pivotal role in the passage of the Light Railways (Ireland) Act 1889, which enabled state funding to support the expansion of rail infrastructure, particularly in economically underdeveloped regions. While most of these lines were constructed in western Ireland, the Ardglass branch was the only one established in what is now Northern Ireland. Its primary aim was to bolster the local herring trade, which was believed to be constrained by the lack of direct railway access to Ardglass Harbour.

Opened by the Downpatrick, Killough and Ardglass Railway, it became part of the Belfast and County Down Railway (BCDR). The line was begun 1890 with the granting of the Downpatrick, Killough, and Ardglass Light Railway Order 1890, obtained under the Light Railways (Ireland) Act 1899. The line was constructed under the management of the BCDR's chief engineer Sir John Macneill.

It began operations in 1892, with stations established at the Downpatrick racecourse, Ballynoe, Killough, and Ardglass. Later on, halts were added at Bright on 12 October 1925 and four years later at Coney Island in 1929.The Loop Platform, a heritage-listed structure and the only original building still standing in Downpatrick, constructed in 1893, was well known for the porters' shouts of "All change for Ballynoe, Killough, and Ardglass".

From an engineering perspective, the line was notably steep by the standards of County Down. It included a sustained incline of 1 in 50 approaching Ballynoe, followed by a comparable descent. The railway company undertook the construction of the line independently, without engaging an external contractor. To minimize the need for extensive excavation and embankment work, the alignment was carefully designed to adhere more closely to the natural contours of the terrain—far more so than other segments of the railway network. Initially, the single-track route was divided into two operational segments, managed using the staff and ticket system. This arrangement remained in place until 1926, when the signal box at Ballynoe was decommissioned, consolidating the line into a single operational section. The station closed to passengers in 1950, by which time it had been taken over by the Ulster Transport Authority. No physical evidence of the halt survives at the site today, however it is still possible to make out where the trackbed of the line was.

== Routes ==
The following diagram shows the heritage railway line operated by the Downpatrick and County Down Railway:

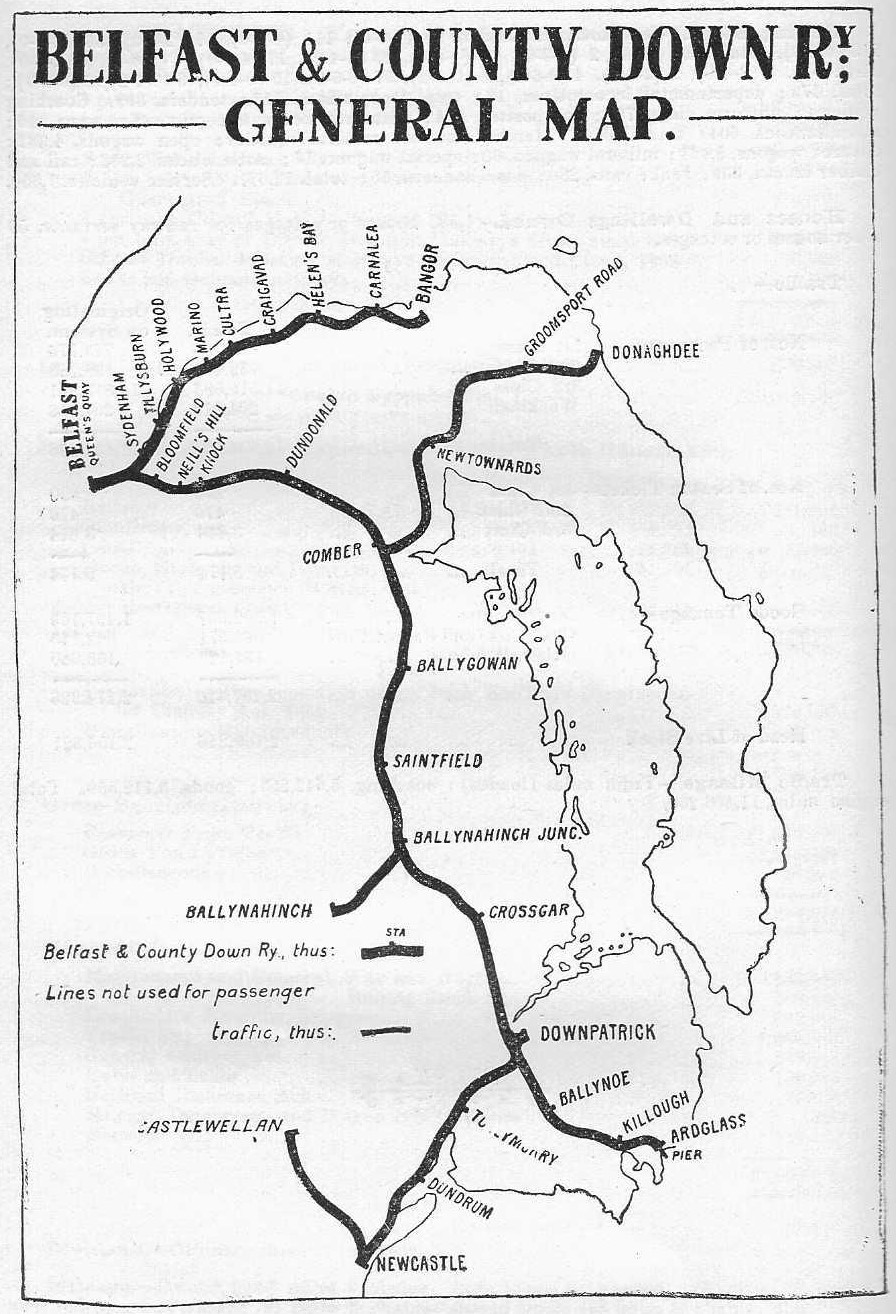
Map of Belfast & County Down Railway 1926

It used to be cheaper to buy two separate tickets—one from Newtownards to Downpatrick and another from Downpatrick to Killough—than to buy a return ticket straight to Killough. A third-class return ticket from Newtownards to Killough cost 2 shillings and 6 pence. But if you bought a return ticket to Downpatrick for 1 shilling and 6 pence, and then a return ticket from Downpatrick to Killough for 7 pence, it added up to less. A specimen timetable from April 1940 has also been published.

== Gallery ==
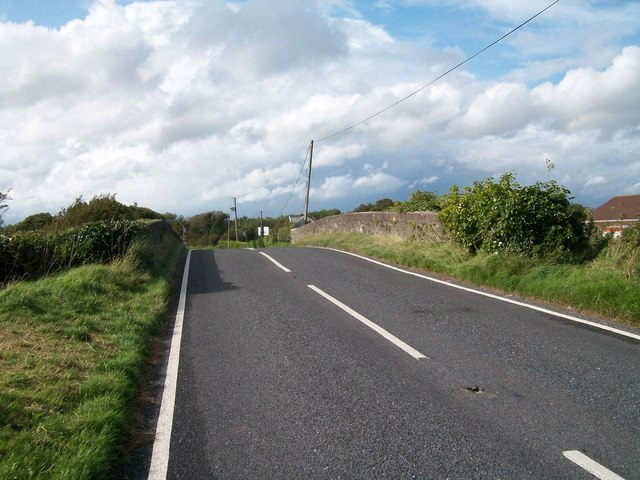
The A2 crossing the former track at Coney Island

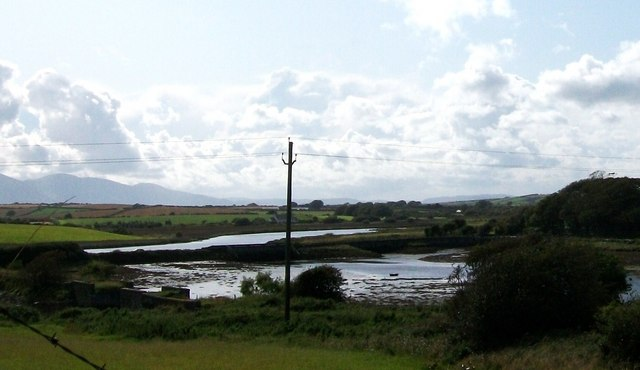
Looking towards Downpatrick, centre is the causeway
for the track to Coney Island Halt

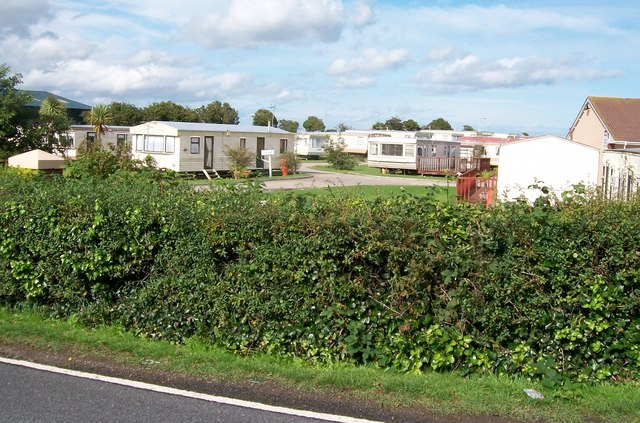
The Coney Island Caravan Park occupies the site of the old Coney Island Halt.

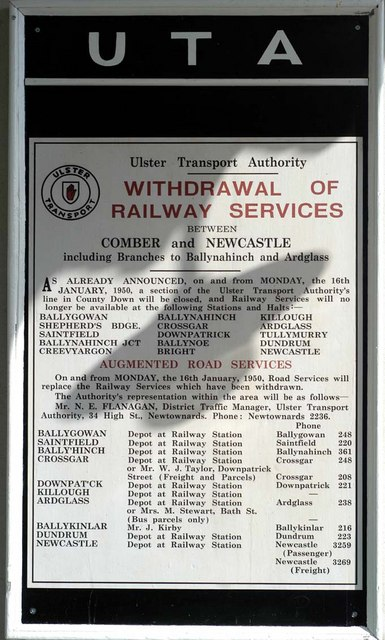
A copy of the original withdrawal notice that was posted at the original Downpatrick station
