= Ballynewport =

Townland in County Down, Northern Ireland

Coordinates: 54°16′25″N 5°44′6″W

Ballynewport: Irish: Baile Neipirt
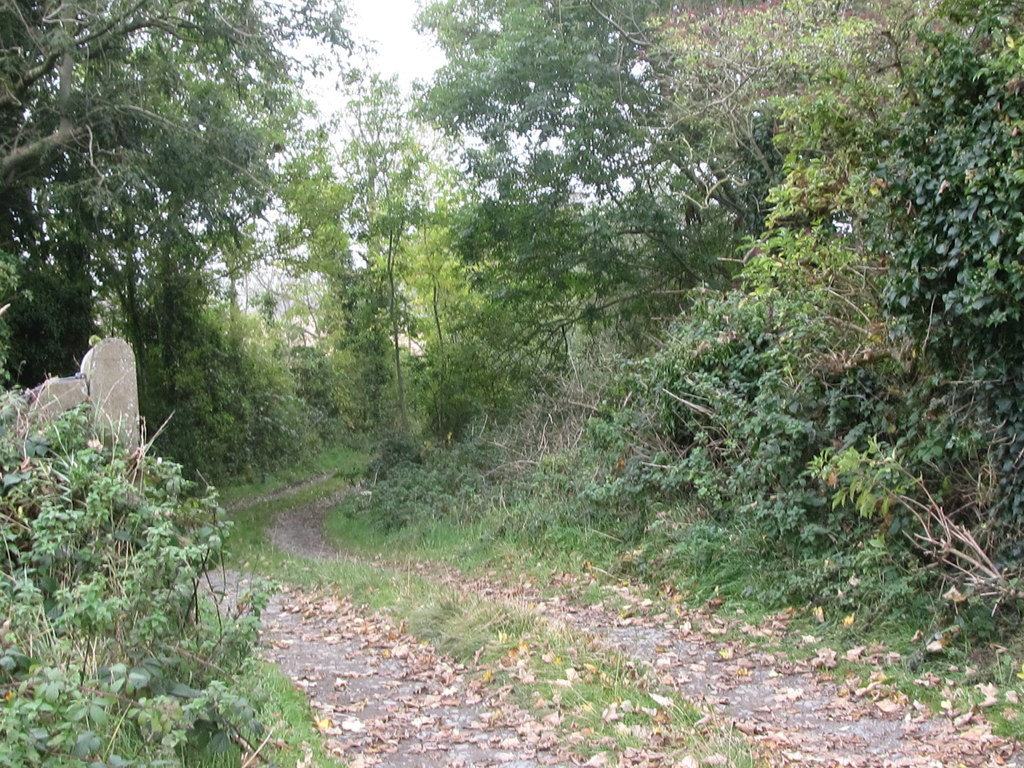
- This track leads to the Ballynewport Bog from the Castlescreen Road.

- Location within County Down
- County: County Down
- Country: Northern Ireland
- Sovereign state: United Kingdom

Ballynewport is a townland five kilometres south of Downpatrick, County Down, Northern Ireland. Ballylucas is 1.1570 km^{2} (285.89 acres). Ballynewport is located in the Electoral Division of Tyrella, within the Civil Parish of Rathmullan, in the barony of Lecale Upper, County Down. The Irish name for Ballynewport is Baile Neipirt.

== History ==
A souterrain is located on the boundary between a barley field and a lane in open countryside in the townland. The entrance to the site, however, remains unidentified. The landowner had previously stated knowing of its location, which is obstructed by stones. The passage was discovered during the construction of a labourer's cottage. A volunteer who entered the souterrain with a hurricane lamp emerged shortly after, visibly distressed and with the lamp extinguished.

The townland of Ballynewport was documented as Ballynebert and Newphertowne in 1641 and as Ballynebert, Ballyanbert, Ballynuport and Newportowne in 1661. The final part of the name seems to be a Gaelic adaptation of the English surname Newport and has been described as a ‘habitation name from any of several towns so called, from Old English neowe ‘new’ + port ‘market town’. In Ireland, the surname is quite rare. A letter of 5 May 1725 from Bernard Brett of Ballynewport to Michael Ward in Dublin records Brett's intention to sell the house and demesne at Ballynewport, indicating Brett family ownership during this period. In 1733 it was purchased by John Smith from executors of Thomas Banks. The townland was owned by the Brett family around 1786 and by Mr. Hamilton in 1836.

== Gallery ==
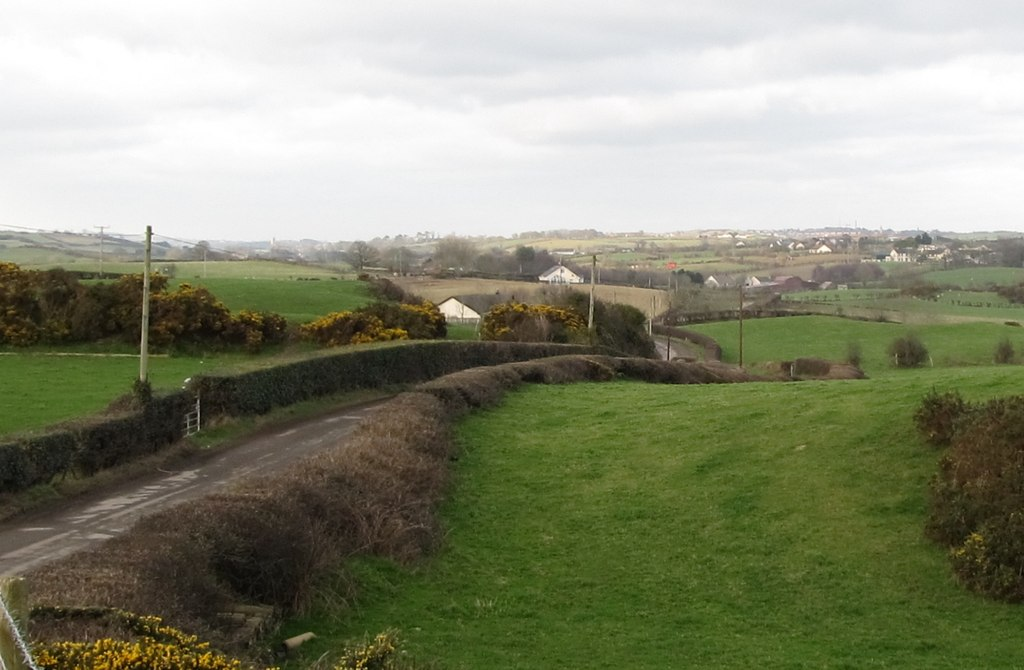
The Ballylucas Road proceeding towards the village of Ballynoe (2011)

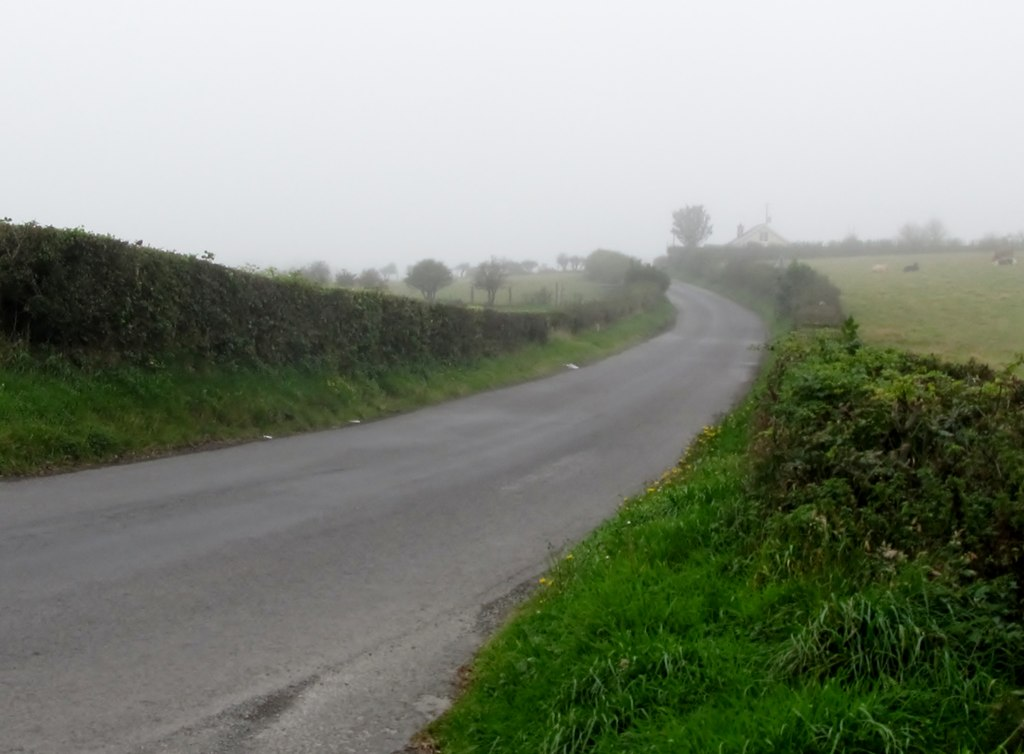
The Ballylucas Road at Ballynewport (2011)

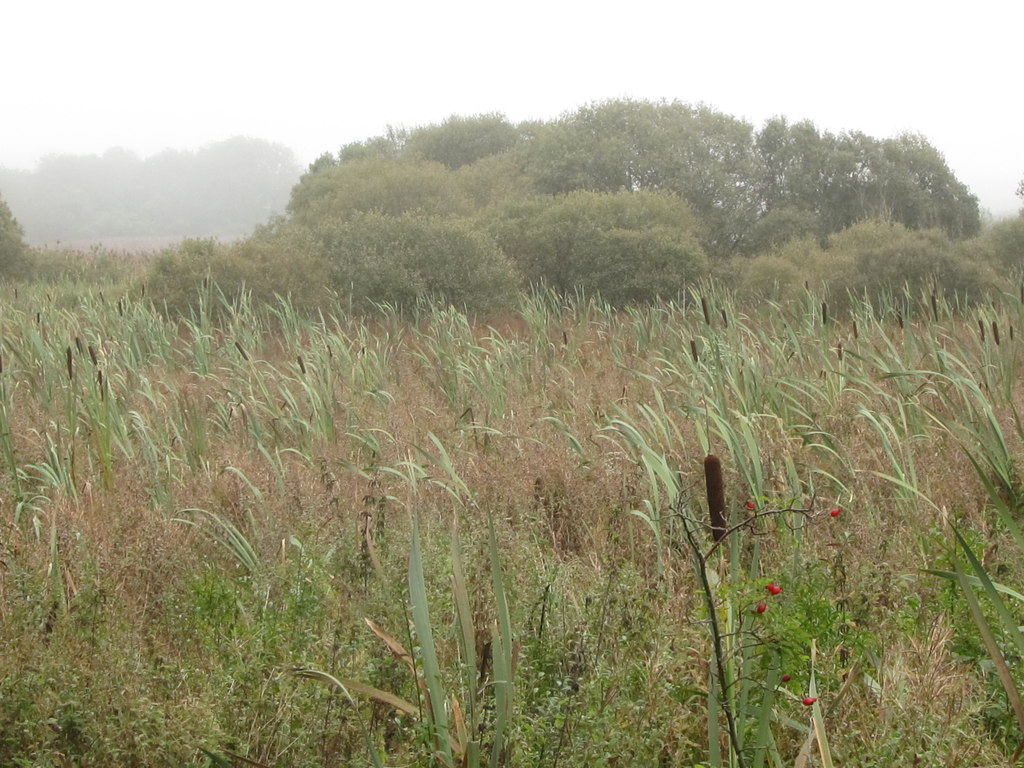
The Ballynewport Bog (2011)

== Geography ==
Townlands that border Ballynewport include:

- Ballydargan to the east
- Ballydonnell to the west
- Ballylucas to the south
- Ballynoe to the east
- Ballyplunt to the west
- Castleskreen to the west
- Islandbane to the east
- Legamaddy to the east
