= Bright Halt railway station =

Railway station in Bright, County Down, Northern Ireland

Coordinates: 54.275963°N 5.67579°W

Former Bright Halt
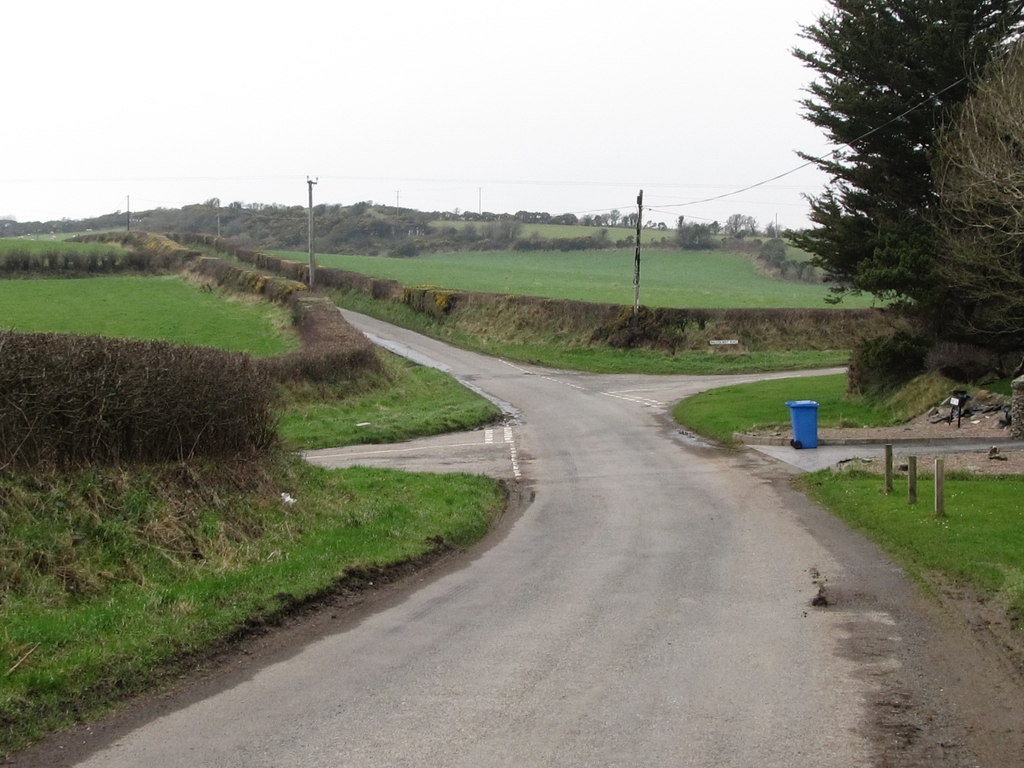
- Ballygilbert crossroads (Approximate site of the Bright Halt)

General information
- Location: Bright, County Down; Northern Ireland
- Lines: Downpatrick, Killough, and Ardglass
- Distance: 8 miles, 4 chains
- Connections: Ballynoe station→Bright Halt→Killough station

Construction
- Architect: George Culverwell (Chief engineer)

Other information
- Status: Disused

History
- Original company: Downpatrick, Killough and Ardglass Railway
- Pre-grouping: Belfast and County Down Railway
- Post-grouping: Great Northern Railway (Ireland)

Key dates
- 8 Jul 1892: Station opens
- 12 Oct 1925: Bright Halt added
- 1929: Coney Island Halt added
- 16 Jan 1950: Station closes
Location
- Location within County Down Location within island of Ireland

Bright Halt railway station was on the Downpatrick, Killough and Ardglass Railway, which ran from Downpatrick to Ardglass in Northern Ireland.

== History ==
The railway branch extended eight miles from Downpatrick South Junction to Ardglass. It was classified as a "Balfour Line", named after Arthur James Balfour, who held the position of Chief Secretary for Ireland between 1887 and 1891 before becoming Prime Minister of the United Kingdom. Balfour played a pivotal role in the passage of the Light Railways (Ireland) Act of 1889, which enabled state funding to support the expansion of rail infrastructure, particularly in economically underdeveloped regions. While most of these lines were constructed in western Ireland, the Ardglass branch was the only one established in what is now Northern Ireland. Its primary aim was to bolster the local herring trade, which was believed to be constrained by the lack of direct railway access to Ardglass Harbour.

Opened by the Downpatrick, Killough and Ardglass Railway, it became part of the Belfast and County Down Railway (BCDR). The line was begun 1890 with the granting of the Downpatrick, Killough & Ardglass Railway Act, obtained under the Light Railways (Ireland) Act. The line was constructed under the management of the BCDR's chief engineer Sir John Macneill.

It began operations in 1892, with stations established at the Downpatrick racecourse, Ballynoe, Killough, and Ardglass. Later on, halts were added at Bright on 12 Oct 1925 and 4 years later at Coney Island in 1929.The Loop Platform, a heritage-listed structure and the only original building still standing in Downpatrick, constructed in 1893, was well known for the porters' shouts of "All change for Ballynoe, Killough, and Ardglass".

From an engineering perspective, the line was notably steep by the standards of County Down. It included a sustained incline of 1 in 50 approaching Ballynoe, followed by a comparable descent. The railway company undertook the construction of the line independently, without engaging an external contractor. To minimize the need for extensive excavation and embankment work, the alignment was carefully designed to adhere more closely to the natural contours of the terrain—far more so than other segments of the railway network. Initially, the single-track route was divided into two operational segments, managed using the staff and ticket system. This arrangement remained in place until 1926, when the signal box at Ballynoe was decommissioned, consolidating the line into a single operational section. The station closed to passengers in 1950, by which time it had been taken over by the Ulster Transport Authority.

The halt comprised a single platform located on the Downpatrick side of a level crossing. No physical evidence of the structure survives at the site today.

== Routes ==
The following diagram shows the heritage railway line operated by the Downpatrick and County Down Railway:

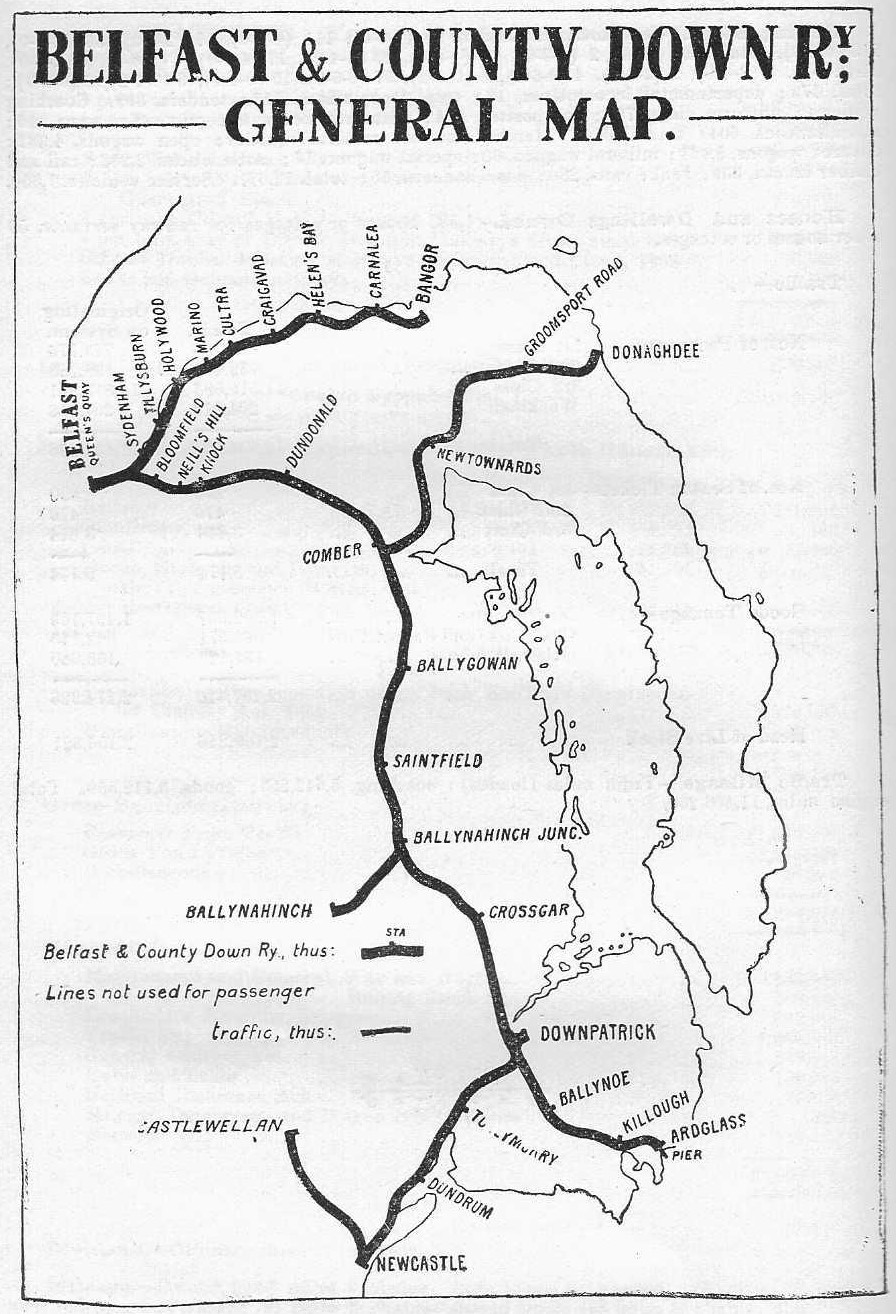
Map of Belfast & County Down Railway 1926

It used to be cheaper to buy two separate tickets—one from Newtownards to Downpatrick and another from Downpatrick to Killough—than to buy a return ticket straight to Killough. A third-class return ticket from Newtownards to Killough cost 2 shillings and 6 pence. But if you bought a return ticket to Downpatrick for 1 shilling and 6 pence, and then a return ticket from Downpatrick to Killough for 7 pence, it added up to less. A specimen timetable from April 1940 has also been published.
