= Killough railway station =

Railway station in County Down, Northern Ireland

Killough
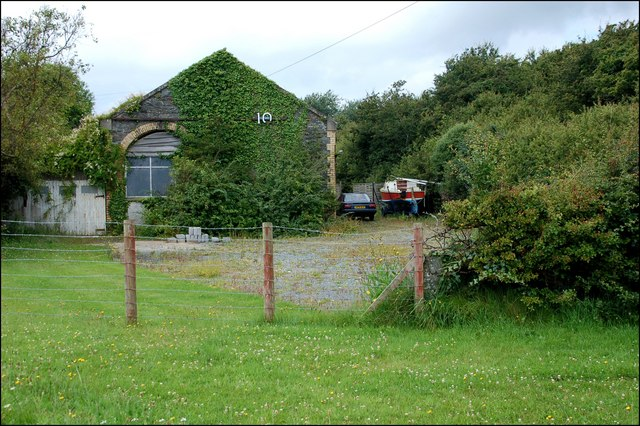
- Old railway station at Killough (2007)

General information
- Location: Killough, County Down; Northern Ireland
- Coordinates: type:railwaystation 54.258795°N 5.643421°W

Other information
- Status: Disused

History
- Original company: Downpatrick, Killough and Ardglass Railway
- Pre-grouping: Belfast and County Down Railway
- Post-grouping: Great Northern Railway (Ireland)

Key dates
- 31 May 1892: Station opens (for fish traffic)
- 8 Jul 1892: Opened to passengers
- 12 Oct 1925: Bright Halt added
- 1929: Coney Island Halt added
- 16 Jan 1950: Station closes
Location
- Location within County Down

Killough railway station was on the Downpatrick, Killough and Ardglass Railway, which ran from Downpatrick to Ardglass in Northern Ireland.

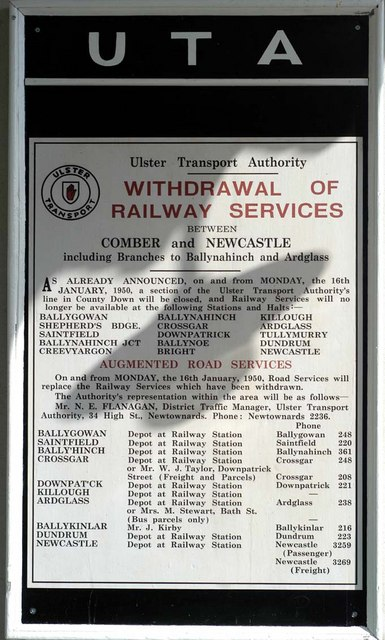
A copy of the original withdrawal notice that was posted at the original Downpatrick station

== History ==
Opened by the Downpatrick, Killough and Ardglass Railway, it became part of the Belfast and County Down Railway (BCDR). The line was begun 1890 with the granting of the Downpatrick, Killough & Ardglass Railway Act, obtained under the Light Railways (Ireland) Act. The line was constructed under the management of the BCDR's chief engineer Sir John Macneill.

It began operations in 1892, with stations established at the Downpatrick racecourse, Ballynoe, Killough, and Ardglass. Later on, Halts were added at Bright on 12 Oct 1925 and 4 years later here at Coney Island in 1929. Initially, the single-track route was divided into two operational segments, managed using the staff and ticket system. This arrangement remained in place until 1926, when the signal box at Ballynoe was decommissioned, consolidating the line into a single operational section. The Killough signal box, which had never functioned as a block post, was also closed during this period. By then, the tramway link to Ardglass Harbour had fallen out of use, leaving the branch line reliant solely on local passenger and goods traffic. The station closed to passengers in 1950, by which time it had been taken over by the Ulster Transport Authority.

The station building and goods shed still exist with the former used for residential purposes.

== Routes ==
The following diagram shows the heritage railway line operated by the Downpatrick and County Down Railway:

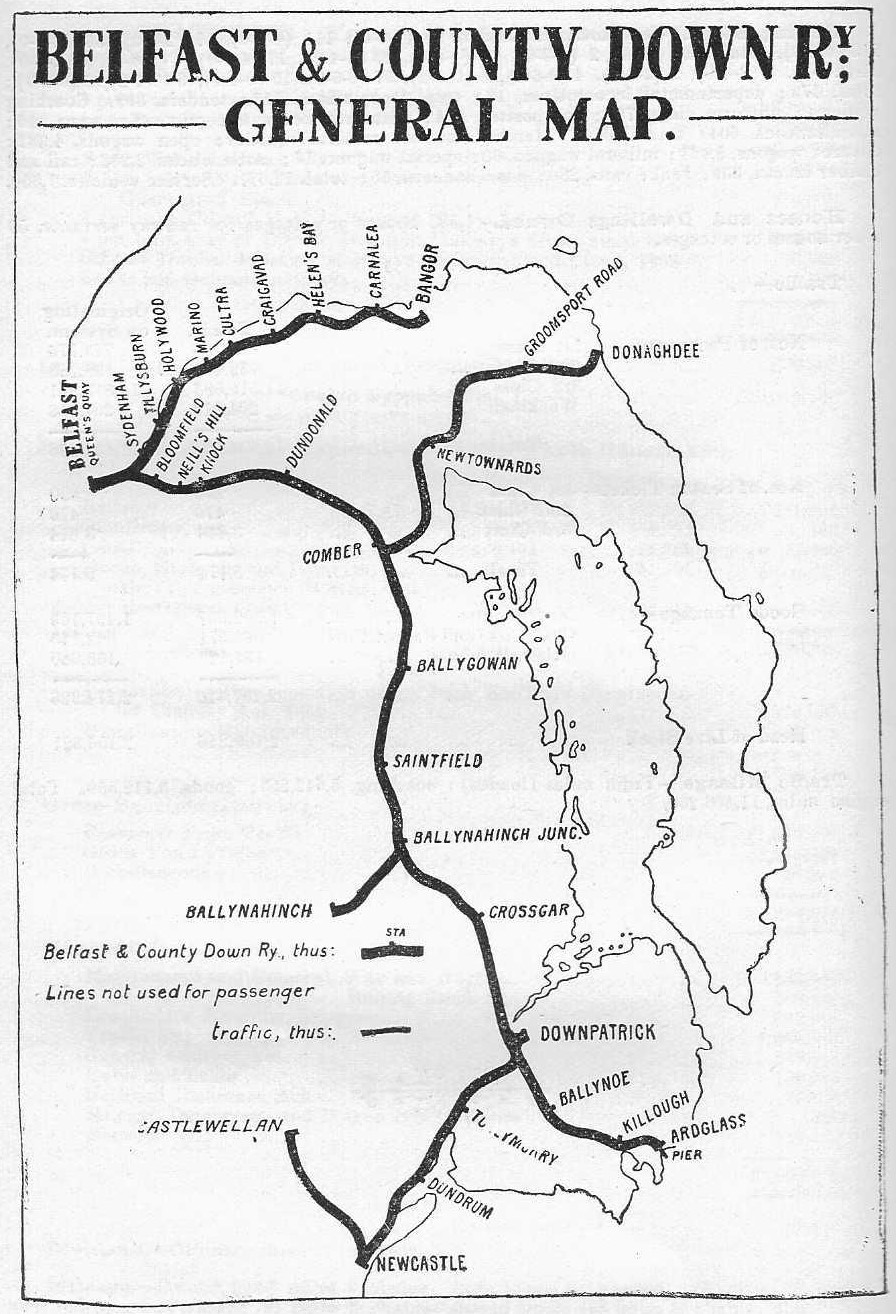
Map of Belfast & County Down Railway 1926

It used to be cheaper to buy two separate tickets—one from Newtownards to Downpatrick and another from Downpatrick to Killough—than to buy a return ticket straight to Killough. A third-class return ticket from Newtownards to Killough cost 2 shillings and 6 pence. But if you bought a return ticket to Downpatrick for 1 shilling and 6 pence, and then a return ticket from Downpatrick to Killough for 7 pence, it added up to less. A specimen timetable from April 1940 has also been published.

== Gallery ==
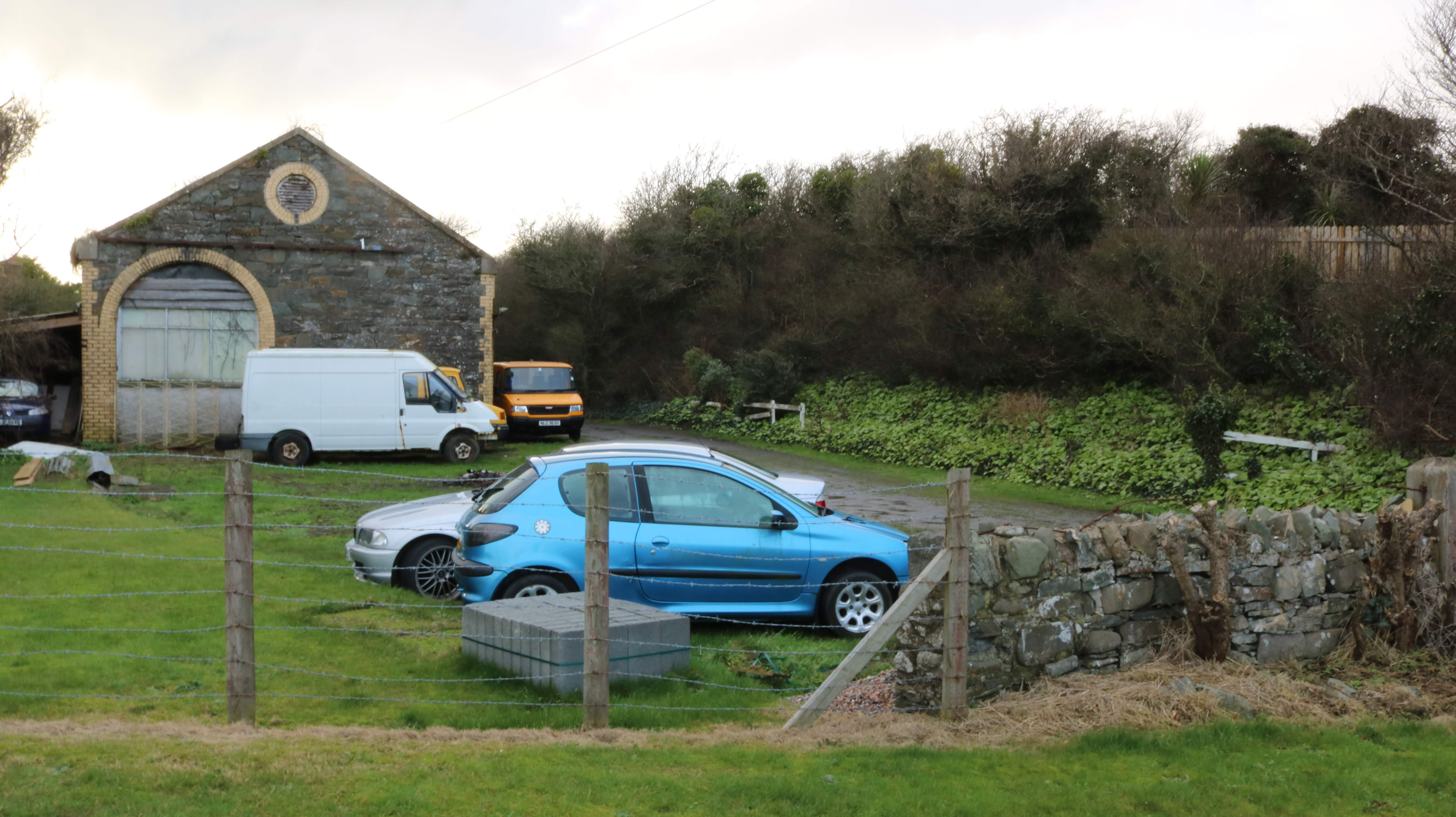
Killough station's former goods shed (2019)

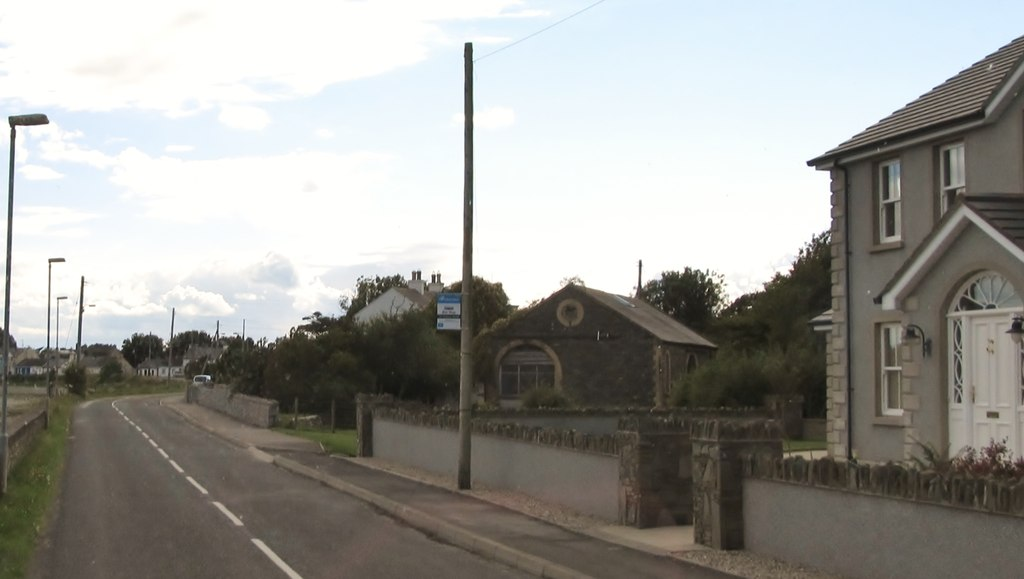
The old railway goods shed at Killough (2013)
