= Coney Island, County Down =

Coordinates: 54°15′23″N 5°37′30″W

Coney Island: Irish: Oileán na gCoiníní
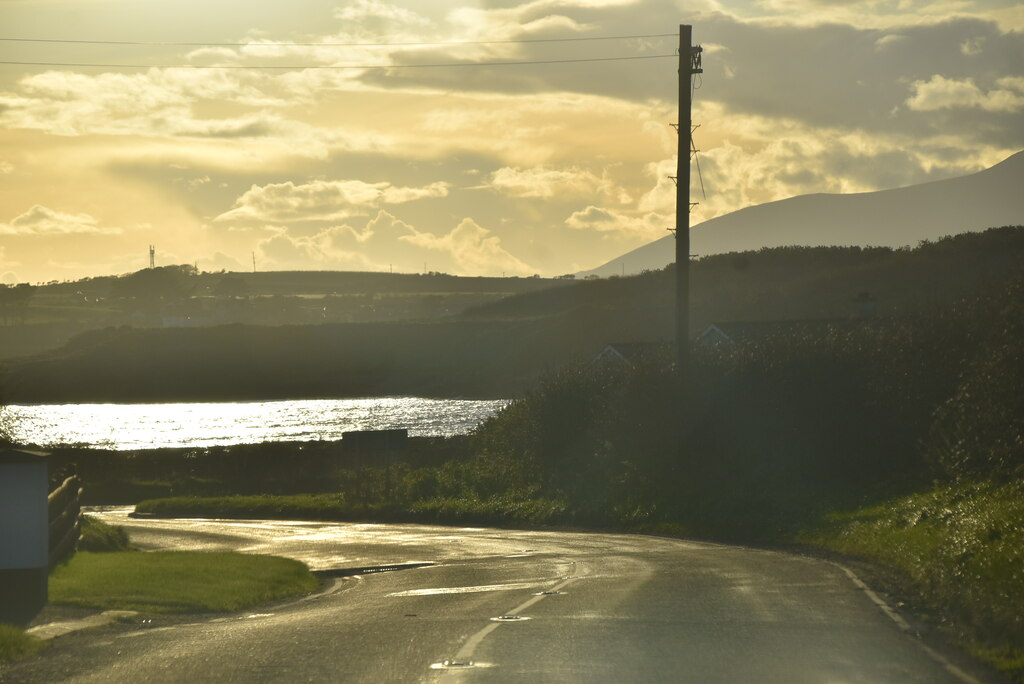

- Location within County Down
- County: County Down
- Country: Northern Ireland
- Sovereign state: United Kingdom
- Police: Northern Ireland
- Fire: Northern Ireland
- Ambulance: Northern Ireland

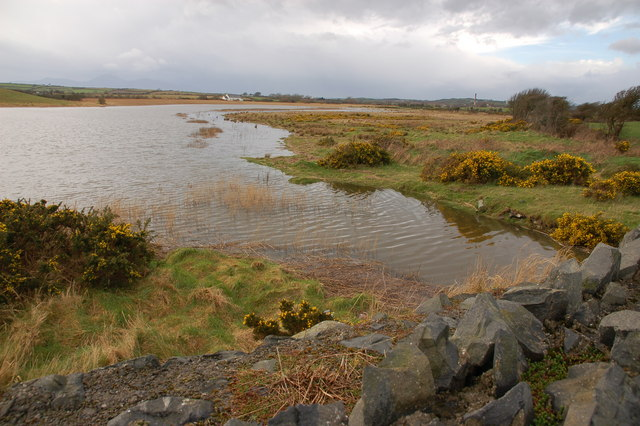
Coney Island in 2007

Coney Island is a small seaside hamlet and townland of 48 acres (19 hectares) in County Down, Northern Ireland, between the villages of Ardglass and Killough. It is situated in the civil parish of Ardglass and the historic barony of Lecale Lower. There is a small caravan park at Coney Island.

It is not actually an island but includes a narrow peninsula which may at one time have been cut off by the sea. The name of the townland is recorded as Conningsiland in 1635, as Cony Is in 1640 and as Conny-Island in 1669. Coney or Cony is a medieval English word meaning rabbit.

== Transport ==
Cony Island Halt opened in July 1892 and was closed in January 1950. No physical evidence of the Halt survives at the site today, however it is still possible to make out where the trackbed of the line was.

== Cultural references ==
"Coney Island" is a spoken-word song written by Northern Irish singer-songwriter Van Morrison and included on his 1989 album, Avalon Sunset. In the song he revisits his youthful trips with his mother to the seaside at Coney Island.

The Shore is a Northern Irish short film directed by Terry George. The film won the 2012 Academy Award for Best Live Action Short Film. It was filmed entirely at George's family cottage at Coney Island.

== See also ==
- List of townlands in County Down
