= Ailill Angubae =

Ailill Angubae according to the Lebor na hUidre version of the Irish mythological tale, the Wooing of Etain, is the brother of Eochaid Feidlech, a High King of Ireland. In this tale, Ailill fell in love with his brothers wife, Étaín, who was one of the Tuatha Dé Danann.

== The Wooing of Étaín ==
Étaín had been the second wife of the Tuatha Dé Danann god, Midir. As punishment for her jealousy towards Midir's first wife Fuamnach, she had been reborn as a human. High King Eochaid having heard of Étaín's beauty, brought her to his palace at Tara. Ailill fell in love with Étaín at the Festival of Tara, after which she was wed to his brother Eochaid. Eochaid's brother, Ailill, having developed an unrequited love for the new queen, gradually succumbed to a wasting disease brought on by his feelings.

Despite her love for her husband, Étaín felt sorry for the ailing Ailill, and to help save his life, promised to sleep with him. Unfortunately Ailill never arrived at the agreed place, having been cast into an enchanted sleep by Midir.
