= Killough =

Village in County Down, Northern Ireland

Coordinates: 54.25°N 5.633°W

Killough: Irish: Cill Locha
- Location within County Down
- Population: 845 (2001 Census)
- District: Newry, Mourne and Down (formerly Down)
- County: County Down
- Country: Northern Ireland
- Sovereign state: United Kingdom
- Post town: DOWNPATRICK
- Postcode district: BT30
- Dialling code: 028
- UK Parliament: South Down
- NI Assembly: South Down

Killough (/kɪˈlɒx/ ki-LOKH; from Irish Cill Locha, meaning 'church of the loch') is a village and townland in County Down, Northern Ireland. It lies on the Irish Sea shore near Ardglass, five miles southeast of Downpatrick. It is a conservation area known for its sycamore-lined main street. In the 2001 census, it had a population of 845 people.

== History ==
The townland of Killough appears in the Down Survey as 'Kiltaghlins'. The owner in 1641 was given as Thomas Cromwell Viscount of Lecale, a direct descendant of Thomas Cromwell chief minister to Henry VIII.

The harbour was built in the 18th century by the Wards of Castle Ward house, just outside Strangford. Michael Ward had the 13 kilometres (8.1 mi) straight road from Castle Ward to Killough built in 1740. Ward called the village 'Port St Anne', but that name did not stick. The name St Anne's Port was also used.

After the outbreak of war between Great Britain and France in 1793. the growing of cereals increased in Lecale and Killough, as one of the ports of export, expanded to deal with it, until its population was almost double what it is today.

A report in 1822 comments on the considerable corn and coal trade and the 22 yawls which "afford the chief supply of white fish to the county of Down."

The existing harbour facilities were soon inadequate and between 1821 and 1824, Michael Ward's son, the first Lord Bangor, employed the engineer Alexander Nimmo, to build new quays at a cost of £17,000. The piers, a long one of nearly 600 feet (180 m) on the Killough side and a short one of 100 feet (30 m) on the Coney Island side, enclosed a fine harbour. The village prospered and the grain merchants built their imposing houses in Castle Street, and their stores on the narrow lane leading to the quays.

The distinctive sycamore avenue along Castle Street was planted in 1850.

Between 1892 and 1950, Killough had a railway station.

The Killough youth & community hall on Main St was originally the Viscount Bangor Primary School.

=== The Troubles ===
In September 1981 an off-duty police officer, Sandy Stewart, was shot dead by the IRA in the Ann Boal Inn. He was engaged to the pub's owner, Ann Boal. She died a few years later.

== Demography ==
=== Historical populations ===
Pender's Census of Ireland, in the 1650s, recorded 21 people in Killough. The Parliamentary Gazetteer of 1846 gave it a population of 1,148 people.

=== 2001 census ===
Killough is classified as a small village or hamlet by the Northern Ireland Statistics and Research Agency (NISRA). That is with a population between 500 and 1,000. On census day in 2001, 29 April 2001, there were 845 people living in Killough. Of these:

- 28.5% were aged under 16 years and 13.3% were aged 60 and over
- 48.3% of the population were male and 51.7% were female
- 91.8% were from a Catholic background and 6.8% were from a Protestant background
- 7.3% of people aged 16–74 were unemployed

== Places of interest ==
St John's Point lighthouse and ancient church are close to Killough. The church dates to the 10th or 11th century. Near the entrance to the church is a holy well and a bullaun stone.

Alms houses on the Rossglass Road were the first endowed by philanthropist Charles Sheils who was born and buried in Killough. They were designed by Charles Lanyon

== Education ==
Killough Playgroup and St. Joseph's Primary School are located on Killough's main street.

== Cultural references ==
Killough was used as one of 133 filming locations for the 2008 Kari Skogland film Fifty Dead Men Walking. It was also used as the main Irish filming location for The Shore, an Academy Award winning short film about a man who emigrated to America to escape The Troubles bringing his daughter back to Northern Ireland to meet his childhood friends. The 30-minute film was shot entirely on location in Killough.

Scenes from Terry George's 2011 film Whole Lotta Sole, starring Brendan Fraser and Martin McCann, were shot on location in the village, using Killough's harbour and beaches for many of the exterior shots. Pixie was also part shot in Killough.

The village is the inspiration for the memoir Sweet Killough, Let Go Your Anchor by Irish politician Maurice Hayes, taken from the publication of the same name.

== Notable people ==
- Paul George, footballer
- Jim Manley, artist
- Charles William Russell (1812–1880), priest and scholar
- Henry Russell (1834–1909), explorer

== Gallery ==
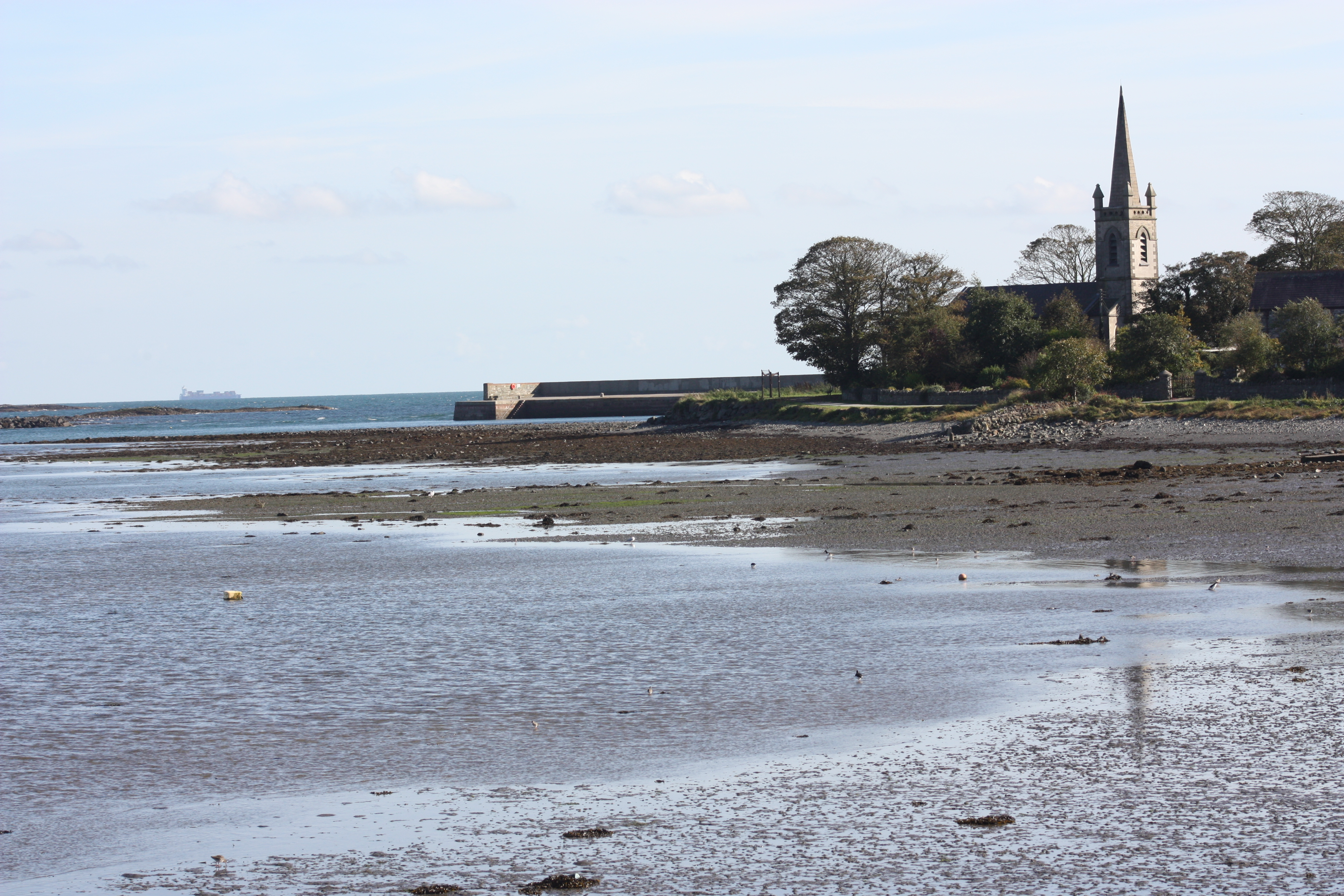
Harbour, October 2009

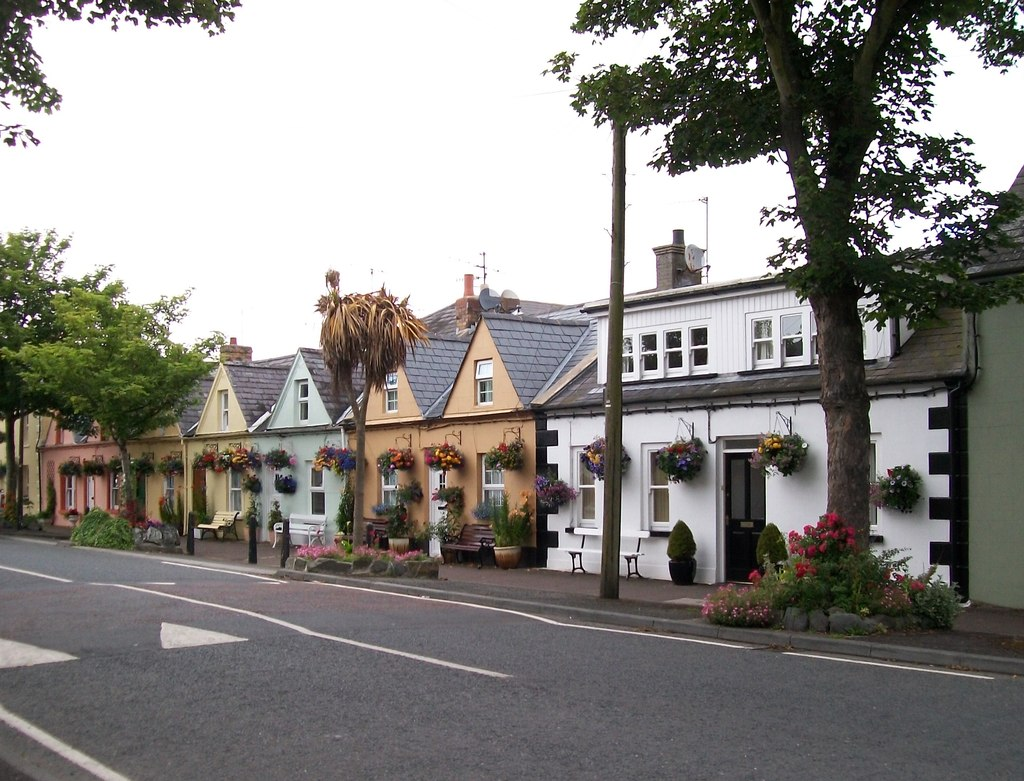
Castle St

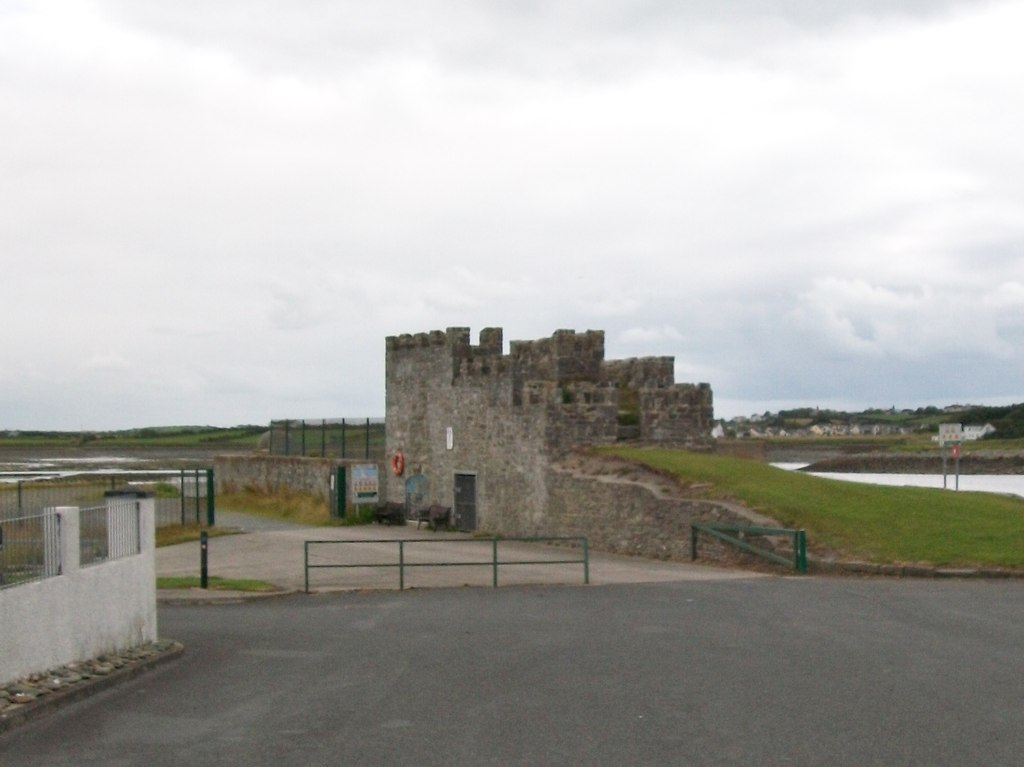
Lime kiln on the quay

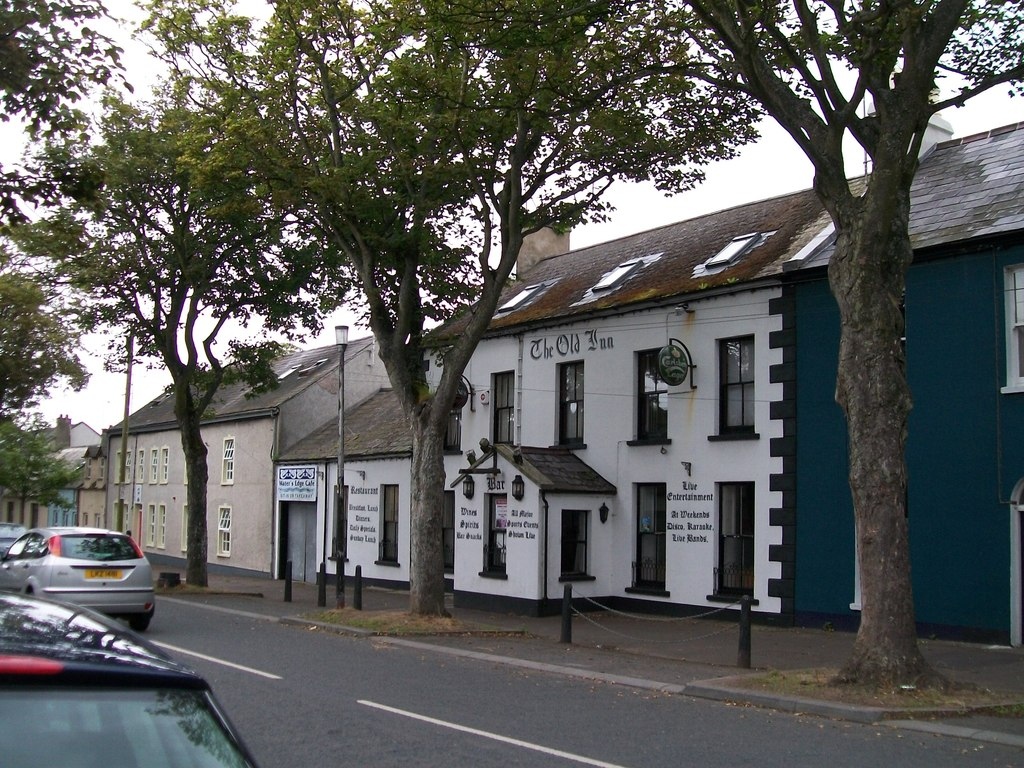
The Old Inn, Castle St

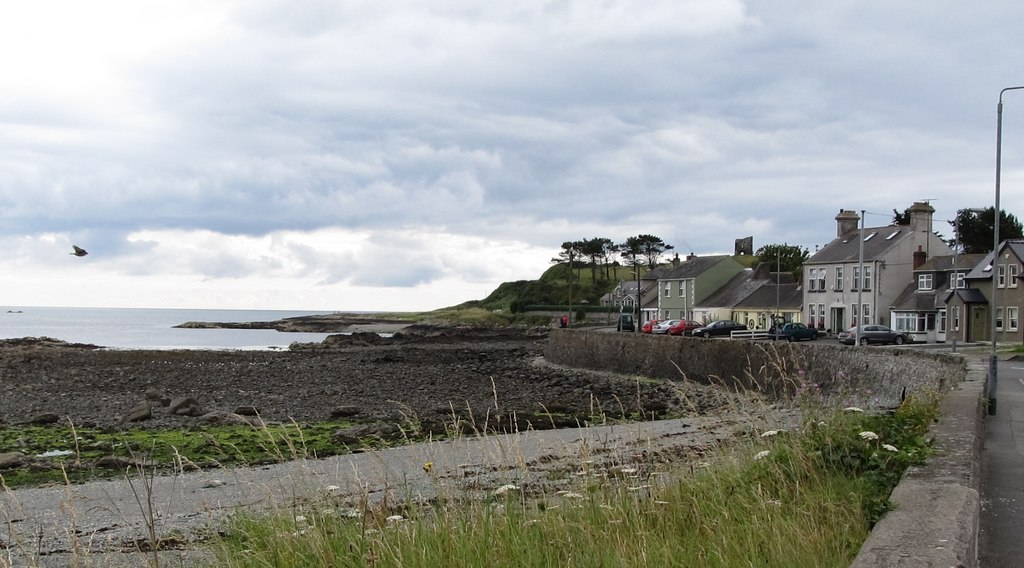
The Fisherman's Row foreshore

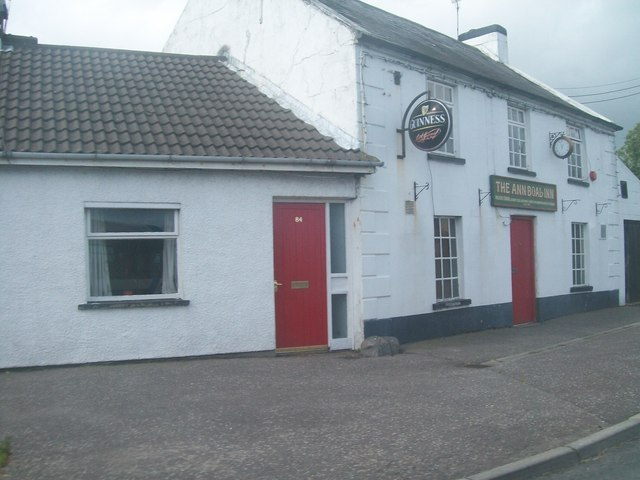
The Ann Boal Inn
