= Ballynoe, County Down =

Townland in County Down, Northern Ireland

Coordinates: 54°17′20″N 5°43′12″W

Ballynoe: Irish: an Baile Nua
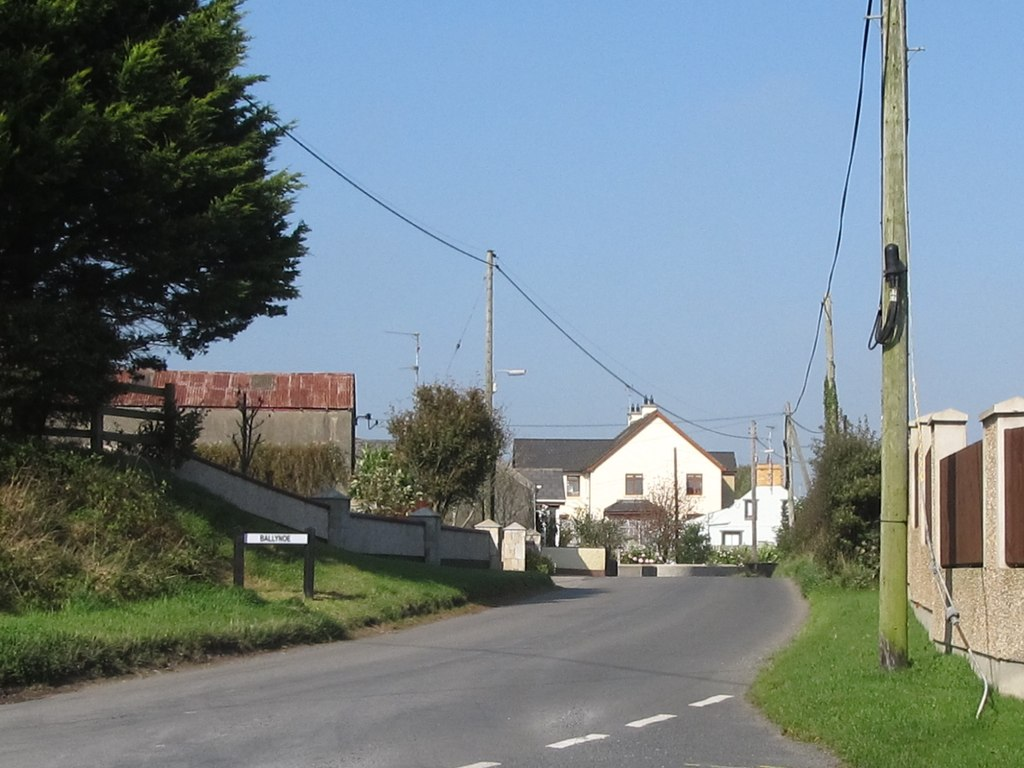
- Entering the village of Ballynoe along the Ballylucas Road

- Location within Northern Ireland Location within County Down Ballynoe (County Down)
- Population: 169 (2011 census)
- Irish grid reference: J496438
- District: Newry, Mourne and Down
- County: County Down
- Country: Northern Ireland
- Sovereign state: United Kingdom
- Post town: DOWNPATRICK
- Postcode district: BT30
- Dialling code: 028
- UK Parliament: South Down
- NI Assembly: South Down

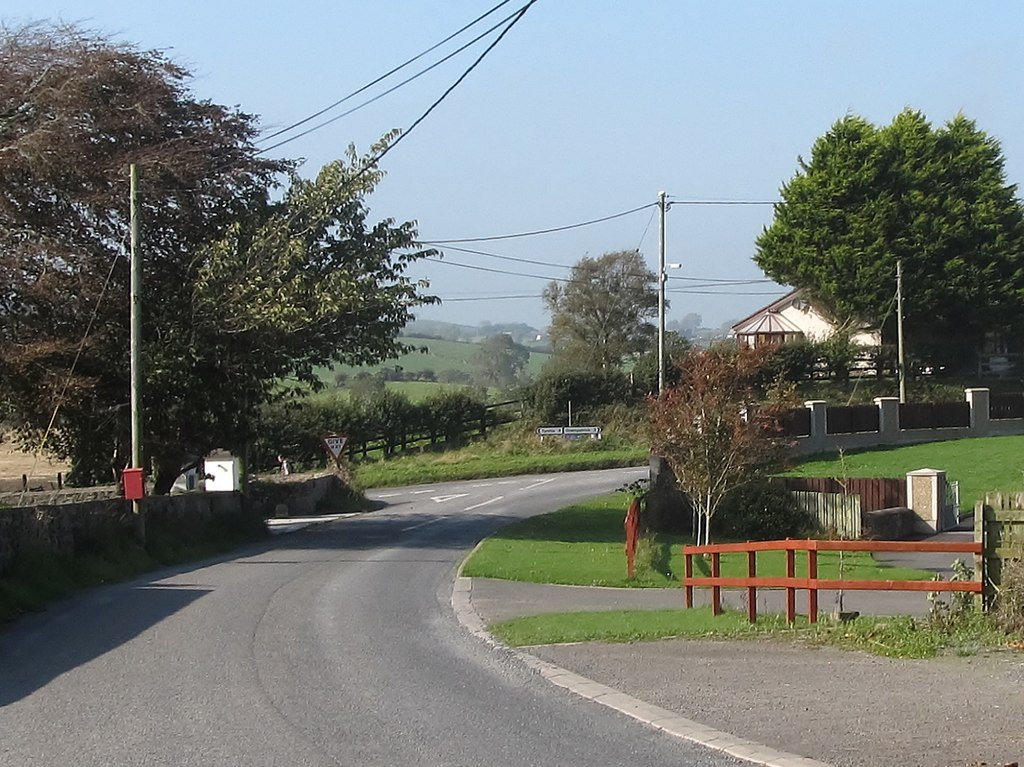
The junction of the Ballynoe and Ballylucas Roads

Ballynoe (Irish: An Baile Nua, meaning 'the new settlement') is a settlement and townland, south of Downpatrick in County Down, Northern Ireland. The townland is approximately 0.84 km^{2} (207.37 acres) in area. It is situated in the civil parish of Bright and the historic barony of Lecale Upper.

== History ==
Ballynoe is the site of an old church, known as the church of Kilschaelyn (Caolán's Church). In the Taxation of Pope Nicholas IV it was taxed at two Marks. The church stood a little to the west of the hamlet of Ballynoe, the cemetery skirting the gardens of the Connor families on that side, where debris of the walls and human remains have frequently been turned up. Reeves also identified 'Kilschaelyn' and noted that it appeared to be similar to 'Capella de Kylsaghlyn', which was appropriated to the Abbey of St. Patrick of Down. The site of the church in Ballynoe was also recorded as being approximately two miles north of the township of Ballydargan. A stone monument from the period of Pope Nicholas's Taxation was also discovered at this site, likely belonging to a knight. It was a part of a cuneiform headstone with an elegant and elaborate cross design. The sculpture on the headstone includes the hilt of a straight Norman sword to the left of the cross. It is likely to have been subjected to the dissolution of the monasteries in 1541. By 1622, Bishop Echlin reported the church as a ruin.

The property attached to the church is detailed in a charter to the Monastery of Mahee Island in Lough Strangford. The Monastery of Nendrum (Nóendruimm) on Mahee (a phonetic spelling of Mochaoi) island in Strangford Lough also has a connection to Ballynoe. The monastery's founder St. Mo Chaoi of Dál Fiatach (died approx. 490 A.D.) was converted by St. Patrick. Originally named Caolán, he was affectionately called Mochaoi by the Irish people. Ballynoe is referred to as BaliehaUan (The town of Caolán) in the Charter of Mahee. The church likely stood near the spot where St. Caolán or Mo Chaoi was converted.

The historical and geographical context of Ballynoe and Legamaddy suggests that St. Patrick might have taken an indirect route from Saul to Bright through Ballynoe due to a lake in the low-lying valley. The site of an even older church than Ballynoe's is located in Legamaddy, near Ballydargan, with graves lined with thin flagstones, indicating its age. A holy water stoup was found there, and it is believed the church became disused when Ballynoe was established.

In 1427, Janico Dartas or D'Artois held properties in Kilsaghlyn, and by the third year of Edward VI's reign, the chapel there was associated with the Abbey of St. Patrick of Down. The inquisition held in 1427 revealed that Sir Janico D'Artois possessed various lands, including half a carucate in Gilberton, gifted by the abbot and convent of the Blessed Mary of Inch, and two messuages (house with its outbuildings and adjacent land) and one carucate in Nuntown, gifted by the prioress and convent of the Blessed Mary of Down. He also held four messuages and three carucates in Kilsaghlyn (Ballynoe) and one and a half carucates in Whetbyton (Whigamstown). Gilberton, originally belonging to the abbey of Inch, likely had a chapel for tenant convenience, though no traces have been found in Ballygilbert or Ballyviggis. Nuntown, known as Ballynagalliagh, had stone-lined graves discovered years ago. Remarkably, all these townlands, except Ballynoe, still belong to the Ardglass estate, which was owned by the Fitzgeralds, descendants of D'Artois, until 1808.

In an inquisition from 1618, the names of the townlands in the parish of Bright are listed, but Ballynoe is not mentioned. However, there is a townland named "Kilschaelyn" included. The Down Survey also reported that in 1641 D.S. Ker, Esq., was the territorial representative and the owner of this townland. Although the ancient name has disappeared, a 1729 deed identifies the church of Ballynoe, and was also known as Kiltougbers and another in 1760 as Kiltaghlins, BaUie-nua. Various historical documents show the evolution of the name from "Killskeaghly" and Killaghlins to the modern "Ballynoe," meaning "new town." These names represent the various forms in which the ancient Irish name appeared before it eventually disappeared and was replaced by Ballyno and eventually the modern name Ballynoe.

In 1732, the tenant farmers in Ballynoe were John Miller & partners and John Patterson. Early ordinance maps from 1834 show Ballynoe prior to the establishment of the railway.

== Mythology ==
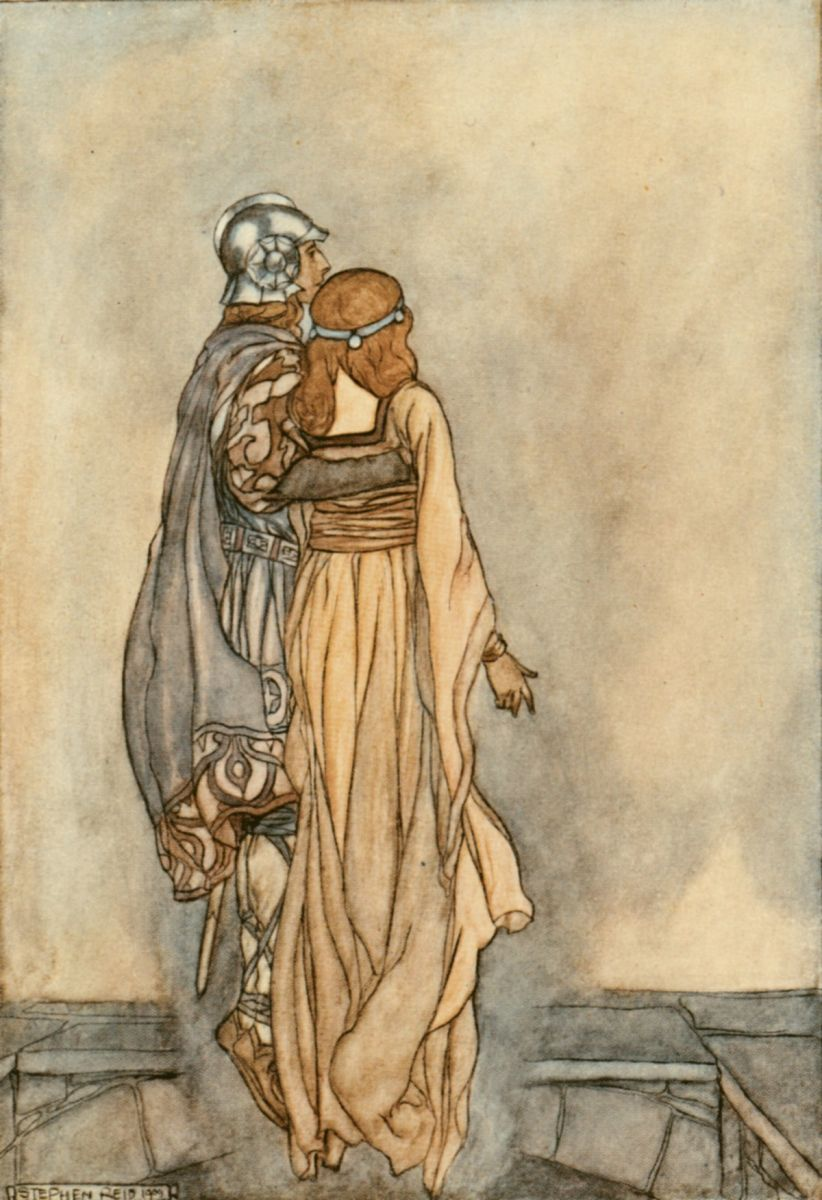
Étaín and Midir, illustration by Stephen Reid in T. W. Rolleston's The High Deeds of Finn (1910)

Tochmarc Étaíne "The Wooing of Étaín" is an Irish mythological tale about the love story between Étaín and Midir, filled with transformations, trials, and eventual reunions despite the jealousy and interference of Midir's first wife, Fúamnach.

Midir, a member of the Tuatha Dé Danann, falls in love with Étaín, but Fúamnach becomes jealous and casts spells on Étaín, who turns her into water, a worm, and finally a fly. Despite these transformations, Midir remains devoted to Étaín, and their love story continues through many trials and transformations until they are finally reunited.

Ailill Angubae, king of the Ulaid and brother of High King Eochaid Airem, falls deeply in love with Étaín and begins to waste away due to his unrequited love. Étaín agrees to meet him to save his life, but Midir intervenes by casting a spell that causes Ailill to fall asleep, preventing their meeting and revealing the depth of Midir's connection to Étaín. Ailill lives in Mag nInis (now known as Lecale) and is likely identified as Ballynoe.

This site is mentioned alongside significant landmarks such as Emain Macha (Navan Fort) and Tara (Hill of Tara). These references highlight the importance of Ballynoe in ancient Irish lore, connecting it to other prominent mythological sites.

== Places of interest ==
=== Ballynoe stone circle ===
The main local feature is Ballynoe stone circle, an ancient site dating to the late Neolithic and Early Bronze Age. It features over 50 monoliths of Ordovician gritstone and granites and has been linked to solar alignments and ancient burial practices. Excavations in the 1930s revealed burial cists and a long mound within the circle. The site is also mentioned in the Tochmarc Étaíne, an early Irish mythological text.

=== Former Ballynoe railway station ===
The disused Ballynoe railway station was part of the Belfast and County Down Railway, which connected Downpatrick to Ardglass in Northern Ireland. The station building, signal box, and goods shed are still standing and have been converted into private properties. While the original brickwork and structure are largely intact, the signal box is in need of repair. The platforms and their canopies are no longer present, but remnants of the platform edges can still be found in some areas.

== Gallery ==
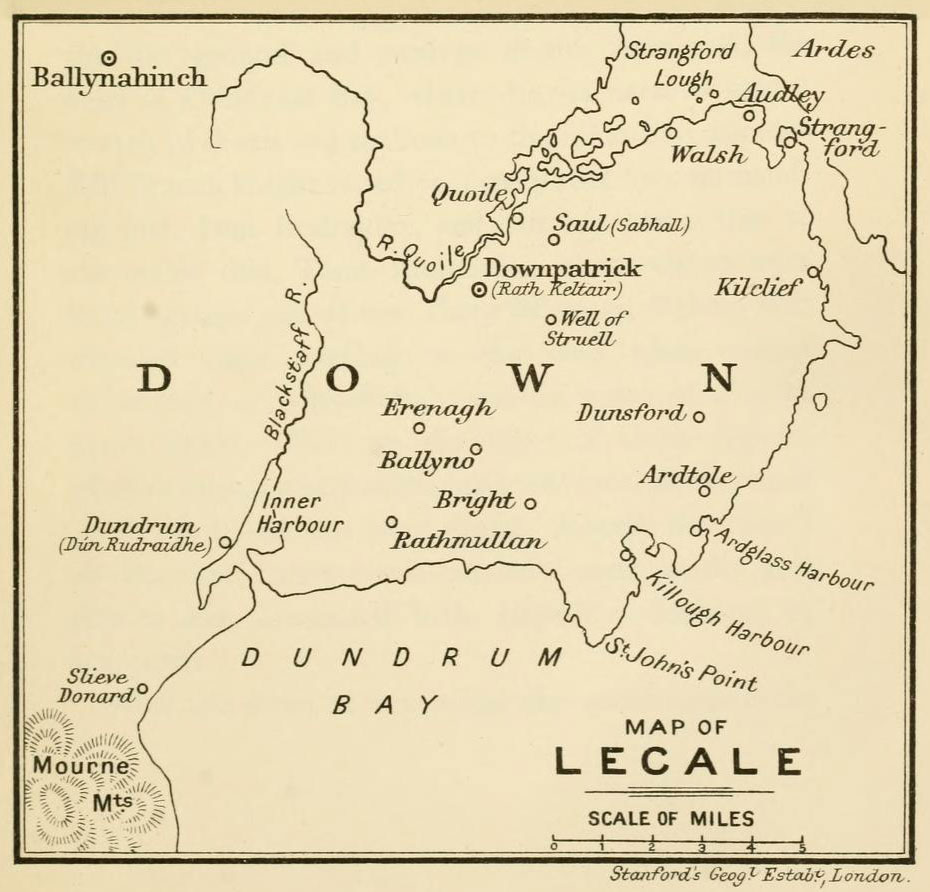
Ballyno (1912)

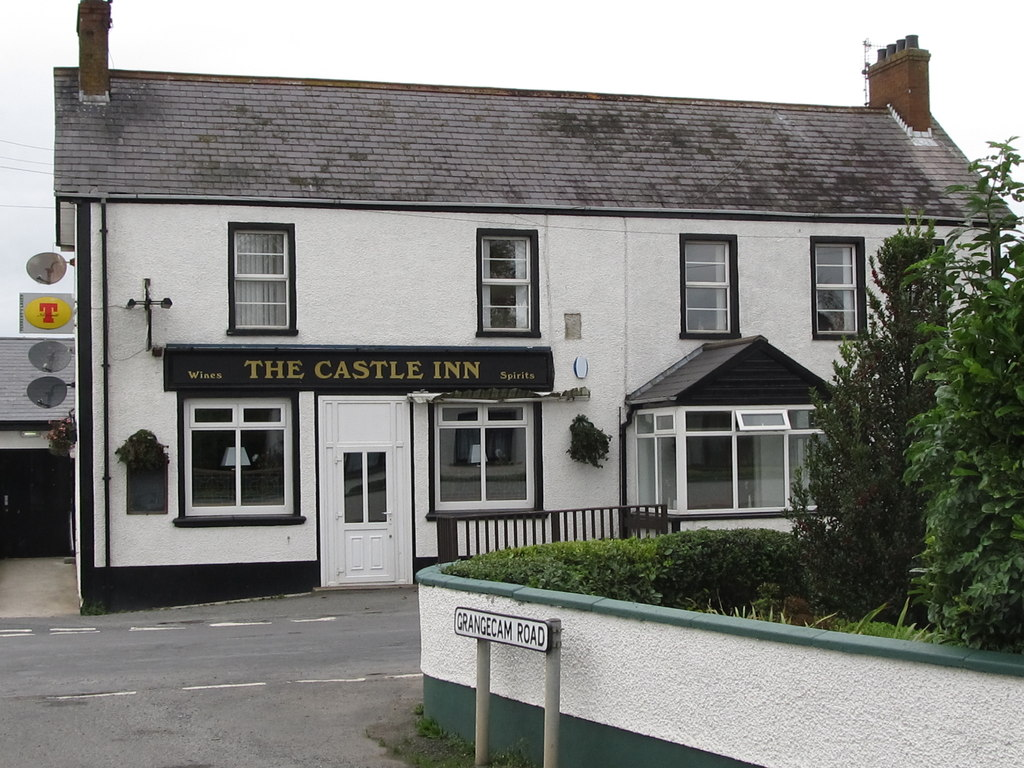
The Castle Inn, Ballynoe (2011)

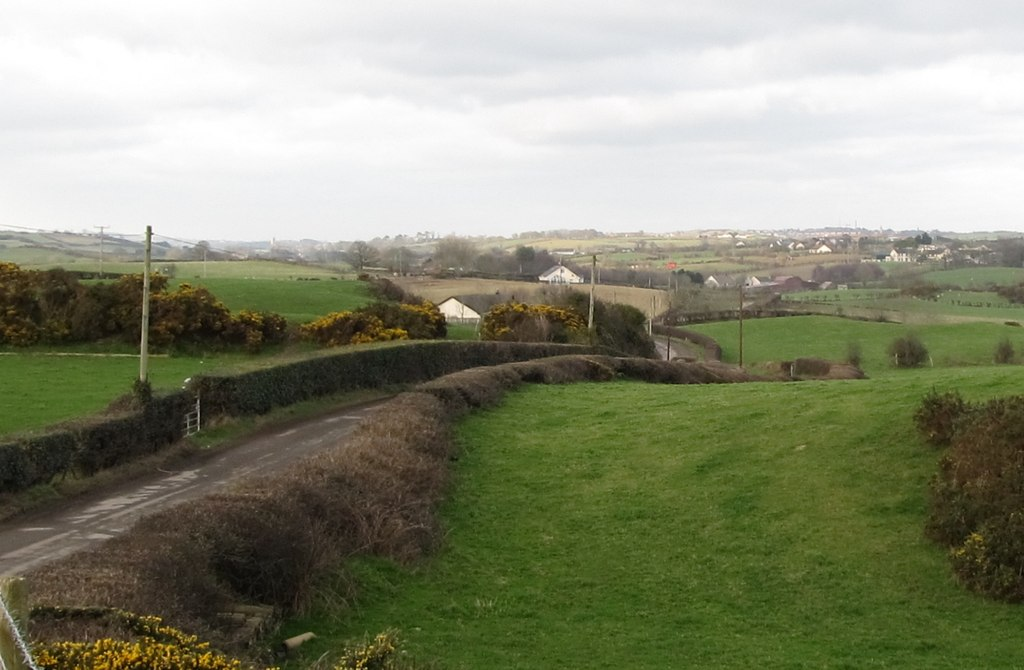
The Ballylucas Road proceeding towards the village of Ballynoe (2011)

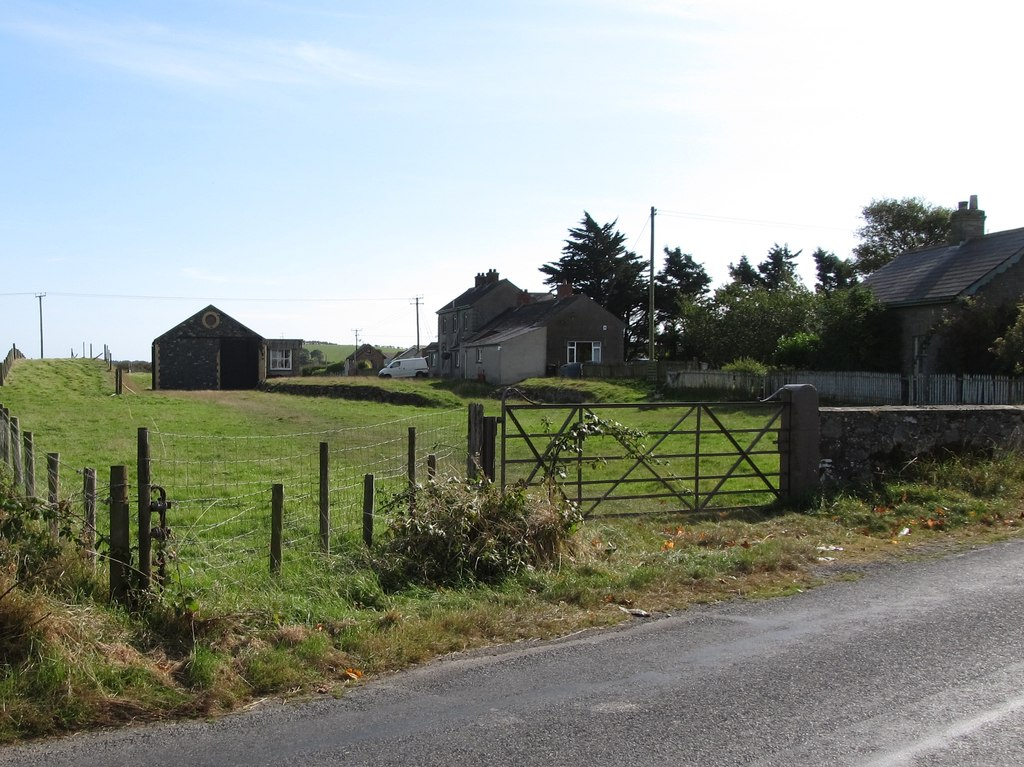
The former Ballynoe Railway Station (2014)

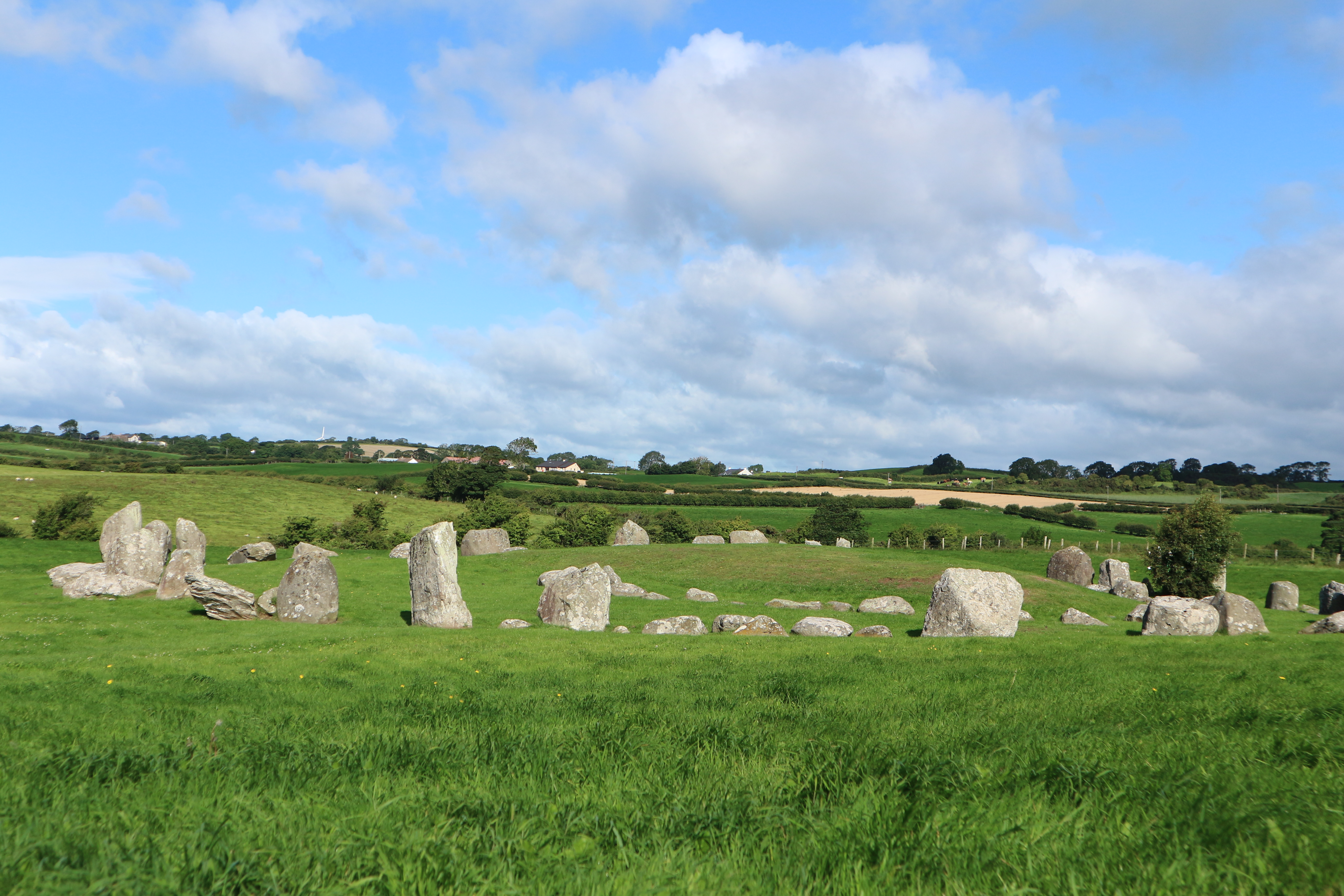
Ballynoe Stone Circle (2020)

== Geography ==
Townlands that border Ballyvange include:

- Ballynewport to the south
- Coniamstown to the east
- Erenagh to the west
- Grangicam to the east
- Islandbane to the west
- Legamaddy to the south
