= Margaret's Castle =

Towe house in County Down, Northern Ireland

Coordinates: 54.2586°N 5.6067°W

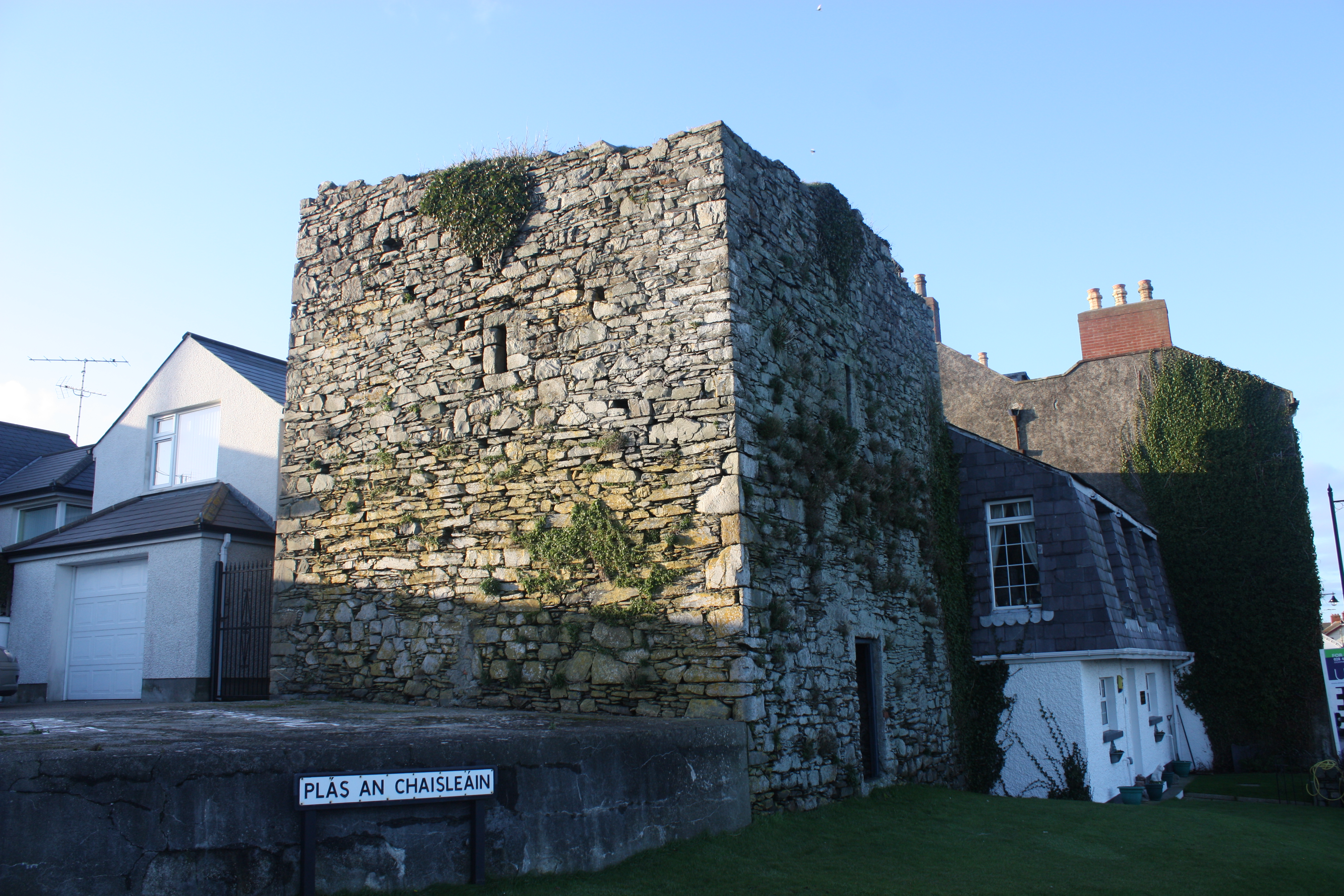
Margaret's Castle, November 2010

Margaret's Castle is a castle in Ardglass, County Down, Northern Ireland. It is a small Tower house probably built in the 15th century. Only two storeys still exist but there is evidence that it was at least three storeys high. It is vaulted above the ground floor with a rectangular tower with projecting turrets in the north west wall. The doorway between the turrets was protected by a murder-hole. A spiral stairway rises within the west turret.

The tower house known as Margaret's Castle is a Scheduled Historic Monument in the townland of Ardglass, in the Newry, Mourne and Down District Council area, at grid ref: J5603 3703.

Ardglass had at least six castles and remains of four of them can still be seen: Ardglass Castle, Cowd Castle, Margaret's Castle and Jordan's Castle.

== See also ==
- Castles in Northern Ireland
