= Ardtole =

Townland in County Down, Northern Ireland

Coordinates: 54°17′20″N 5°43′12″W

Ardtole: Irish: Ard Tuathail
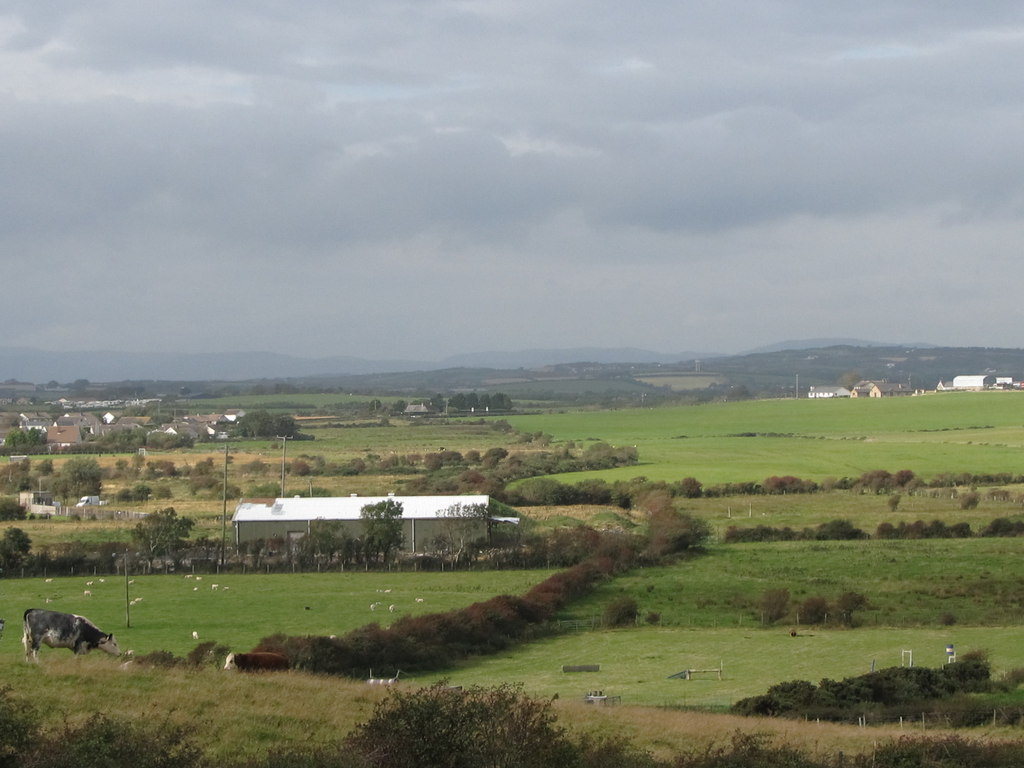
- View across Ardtole taken from the Church

- Location within County Down
- Irish grid reference: J564382
  - Belfast: 32 mi (51 km)
- District: Newry, Mourne and Down District Council
- County: County Down
- Country: Northern Ireland
- Sovereign state: United Kingdom
- Post town: ARDGLASS
- Postcode district: BT30
- Dialling code: 028
- UK Parliament: South Down

Ardtole (from Irish Ard Tuathail, meaning 'Tuathal’s height') is a townland of 431 acres in County Down, Northern Ireland, near Ardglass. It is situated in the civil parish of Ardglass and the historic barony of Lecale Lower. The southern part of Ardtole townland is known as English Ardtole and the northern part is known as Irish Ardtole.

The townland contains the remains of Ardtole Church, a 15th-century ruined church dedicated to St Nicholas (grid ref: J564382). Close by is a holy well, known as St Patrick's Well.

== See also ==
- List of townlands in County Down
