= King's Castle =

King's Castle may refer to:

- King's Castle, Ardglass, a twelfth century castle in County Down, Northern Ireland
- King's Castle, Wells, an Iron Age settlement in central Somerset, England
- King's Castle, Wiveliscombe, a Neolithic hillfort in south Somerset, England
- King's Castle, Castle Islands Fortifications, Bermuda, the oldest surviving English fortification in the New World
- The King's Castle, the only permanent collection of Elvis Presley personal memorabilia in Australia
