= Ringfad =

Townland (administrative division) in Northern Ireland

Coordinates: 54°15′7″N 5°36′42″W

Ringfad: Irish: An Rinn Fhada ‘the long point or headland’
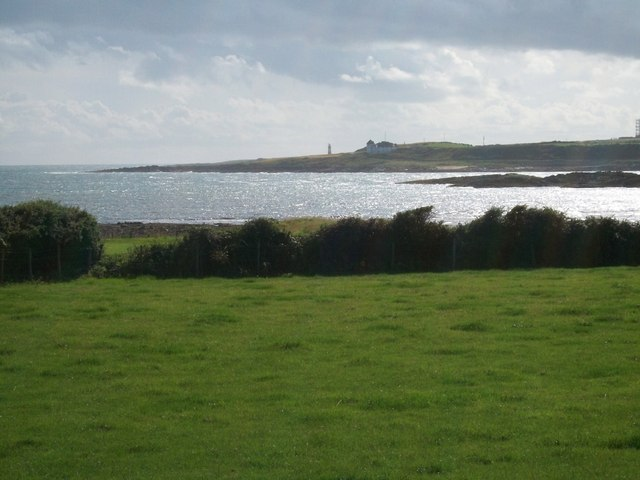
- View across farmland on Ringfad point

- Location within County Down
- Irish grid reference: G5570936307
- District: Newry, Mourne and Down
- County: County Down
- Country: Northern Ireland
- Sovereign state: United Kingdom
- Post town: DOWNPATRICK
- Postcode district: BT30
- Dialling code: 028
- UK Parliament: South Down
- NI Assembly: South Down

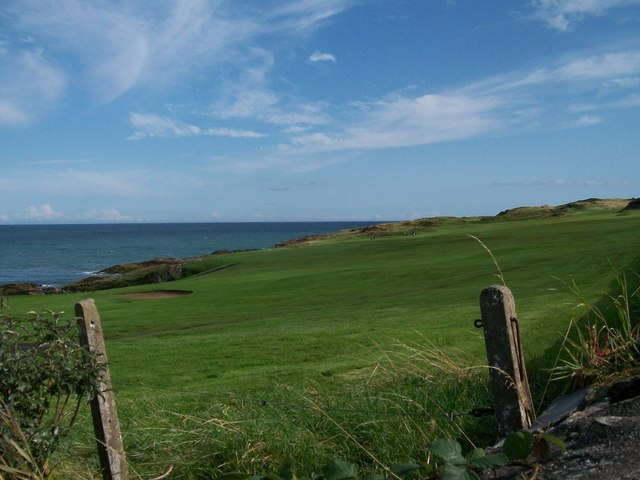
Ardglass Golf Course on Ringfad Point.

Ringfad (from Irish An Rinn Fhada, meaning 'the long point or headland') is a townland of 225.8 acres in County Down, Northern Ireland. It is situated in the civil parish of Ardglass and the historic barony of Lecale Lower.

The Irish word rinn denotes a point of land, promontory, or small peninsula, and is commonly found in Irish place names. In County Down, it is frequently anglicised as Ring and may refer to either a coastal point or a promontory. The name refers to the broad peninsula adjoining Ardglass on the south and forming the eastern side of Coney Island Bay. The point of land at the end of the peninsula is known as Ringfad Point.

Ringfad forms a broad peninsula adjoining the village of Ardglass to the south. It defines the eastern boundary of Coney Island Bay, with its southernmost tip known as Ringfad Point. The peninsula is notable for its proximity to local landmarks such as Ardglass Golf Club and Killough Bay. Ringfad is situated approximately 1.2 kilometres southeast of Killough, across Killough Bay, which separates the two coastal settlements.

== History ==
Ringfad is a townland whose name is historically recorded as Ringfad circa 1659 and, in a corrupted form, as Binfadd in 1662. The name is derived from the Irish An Rinn Fhada, meaning "the long point" or "long headland."

=== Ringfad Point ===
Ringfad Point has a notable history of maritime incidents due to its exposed coastal position. Several shipwrecks have occurred in the area, particularly during the 19th century. The vessels varied in origin and cargo, ranging from coal and ballast to glass bottles and bone manure. In modern times, the fishing vessel FV Greenhill sank near Ringfad in 2006, resulting in the loss of two crew members.

A notable wreck includes the Enterprise of Lynn, a West Indiaman sailing from Lima and Rio de Janeiro to Liverpool, when it was wrecked near Ringfad Point in 1827. The ship was carrying valuable cargo including indigo, cotton, and hides. Eleven people died in the disaster, including the captain, his wife, and children. The tragedy was memorialized in a folk ballad titled “The Wreck of the Enterprise”.

Not all shipwrecks resulted in the loss of lives. On September 24, 1941, the SS Bereby, a cargo vessel operated by Elder Dempster Lines, was wrecked on the rocks at Ringfad Point. Originally built in 1919 as War Raven, the ship was en route from Liverpool to the Gold Coast carrying military personnel and equipment. Due to an unexplained navigational error, the vessel veered north instead of heading south, ultimately running aground. Although the ship was lost, no lives were lost and much of the cargo was salvaged. No formal investigation into the incident was conducted.

== Sport ==
Ringfad is home to Ardglass Golf Club, an 18-hole links course that occupies much of the peninsula. The course was originally established in 1896 as a 7-hole layout and expanded over the following century to include land stretching out to Ringfad Point and around Coney Island Bay. The clubhouse is housed in a fortified warehouse dating back to 1405 called Ardglass Castle.

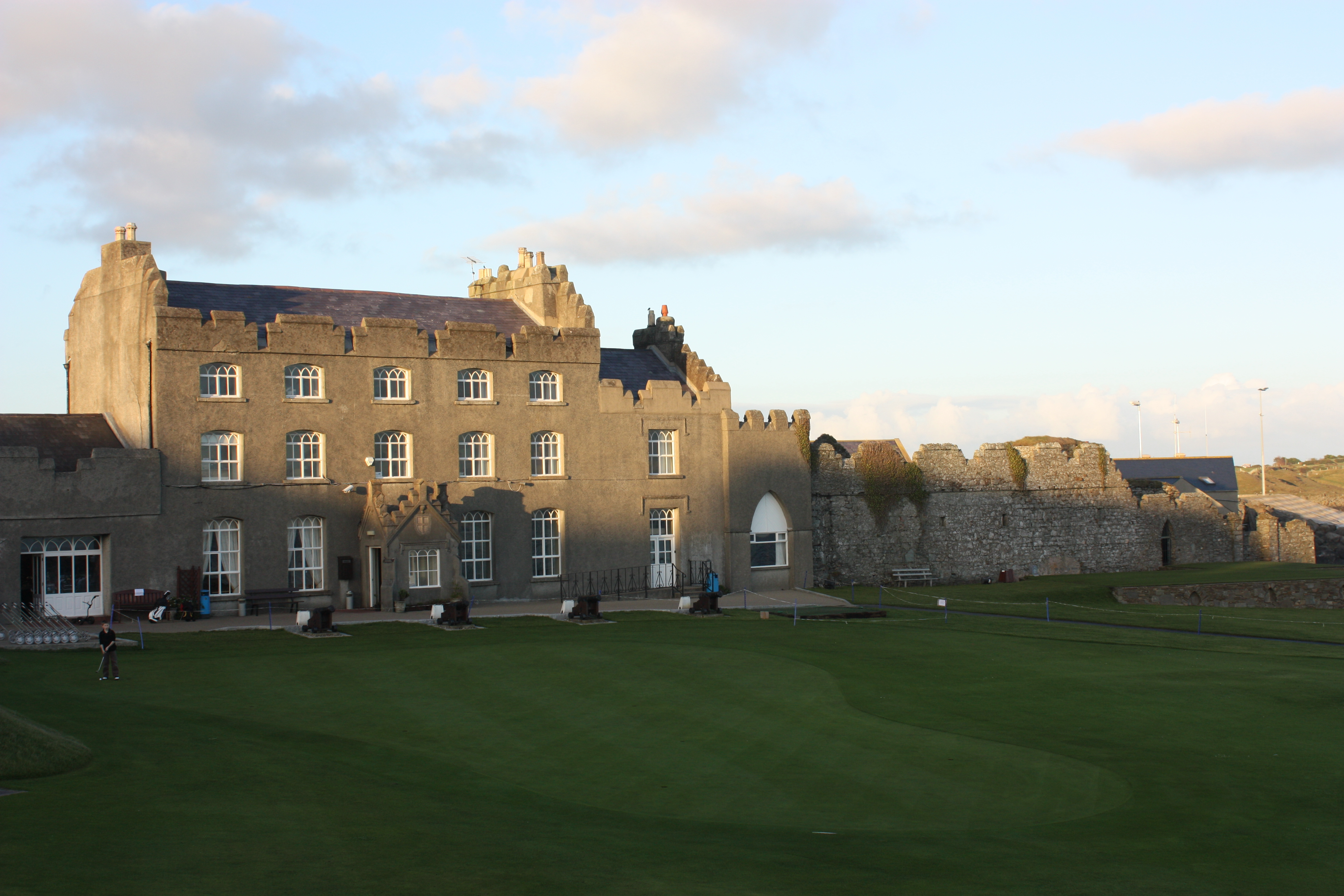
Ardglass Castle ruins (on the right), November 2010

This structure served as a secure facility for merchants engaged in import and export activities during the early 15th century. The initial construction of the building is dated to no later than 1405, making it one of the oldest surviving commercial buildings in the region. By the 18th century, the fortified warehouse underwent a transformation into a private residence. A substantial architectural extension was completed around 1788, reflecting the domestic style of the period while retaining elements of its medieval origins. Today, the building functions as the clubhouse for Ardglass Golf Club and is recognized as one of the oldest buildings in the world used for this purpose.

== Geography ==
Townlands that border Ringfad include:

- Ardglass to the north
- Coney Island to the west
- Tullycarnan to the north

== See also ==
- List of townlands in County Down
