= Dunsfort, County Down =

Civil parish in County Down, Northern Ireland

Dunsfort is a civil parish in County Down, Northern Ireland. It is situated in the historic barony of Lecale Lower. It is also a townland of 384 acres.

== Settlements ==
The civil parish contains the following settlements:

- Ballyhornan

== Townlands ==
Dunsfort civil parish contains the following townlands:

- Ballybeg
- Ballyedock Lower
- Ballyedock Upper
- Ballyhornan
- Ballymenagh
- Bishops Court
- Corbally
- Dunsfort
- Guns Island
- Lismore
- Ringawaddy
- Sheepland Beg
- Sheepland More
- Tollumgrange Lower
- Tollumgrange Upper
- Tullynaskeagh

== See also ==
- List of civil parishes of County Down
