= List of shipwrecks in March 1881 =

The list of shipwrecks in March 1881 includes ships sunk, foundered, grounded, or otherwise lost during March 1881.

== 1 March ==
List of shipwrecks: 1 March 1881
Ship	State	Description
Donna Maria	Flag unknown	The ship collided with the steamship Ravenshoe (United Kingdom) and sank at Ouistreham, Calvados, France. Donna Maria was on a voyage from Wexford, United Kingdom to Ouistreham.
Zealandia	United Kingdom	The full-rigged ship ran ashore in the River Thames and Barking, Essex whilst avoiding a collision with another vessel. She was on a voyage from Otago, New Zealand to London. She was refloated the next day and completed her voyage.

== 2 March ==
List of shipwrecks: 2 March 1881
Ship	State	Description
Alvina	(United Kingdom of Great Britain and Ireland) Guernsey	The ship departed from Arbroath, Forfarshire for London. No further trace, reported missing.
Bee	United Kingdom	The smack was wrecked on Fannet Point, County Donegal. Her crew were rescued. She was on a voyage from Larne, County Antrim to Dunfanaghy, County Donegal.
Borthwick	United Kingdom	The steamship ran aground on the Dumball, in the River Avon. She was refloated the next day with assistance from the tugs Empress of India, Iris, Peri and Sea Queen (all United Kingdom).
Cambrian	United Kingdom	The full-rigged ship departed from Bristol, Gloucestershire for a port in the Cameroons. No further trace, reported overdue.
Cecilie Caroline	France	The ship was driven ashore at Apple-tree, on the south coast of Cornwall, United Kingdom with the loss of all five crew. She was on a voyage from Charlestown, Cornwall to Nantes, Loire-Inférieure.
Eupatoria	United Kingdom	The ship departed from the River Tyne for Cowes, Isle of Wight. No further trace, reported overdue.
Griffin	United Kingdom	The barque was driven ashore on Fidra, Lothian. She was on a voyage from Aberdeen to Burntisland, Fife. She was refloated and towed in to Leith, Lothian.
Ida	Norway	The brigantine collided with the barquentine Parthia (United Kingdom) and foundered in the English Channel off St. Catherine's Point, Isle of Wight, United Kingdom. Three of her crew were rescued. Ida was on a voyage from Charlestown, Cornwall to Brevig.
Lechmere	United Kingdom	The steamship was driven ashore at Whitburn, County Durham. She was on a voyage from Hamburg, Germany to the River Wear. She was refloated with the assistance of five tugs and taken in to Sunderland, County Durham.
Victory	United Kingdom	The pilot cutter collided with the steamship Acorn (United Kingdom) and sank in the Bristol Channel off Lundy Island, Devon. Her crew were rescued by Acorn.

== 3 March ==
List of shipwrecks: 3 March 1881
Ship	State	Description
Afton	United Kingdom	The steamship was driven ashore at Kilroot Point, County Antrim. She was on a voyage from Belfast, County Antrim to Ayr.
Ajace	Italy	The barque was wrecked off Rockaway Beach, New York, United States with the loss of all but one of her fifteen crew. She was on a voyage from Belgium to New York City. Her wreck settled in 25 feet (8 m) of water and became known as "the Italian Wreck".
Albion	United Kingdom	The schooner was wrecked at Annalong, County Down. Her crew were rescued by rocket apparatus. She was on a voyage from Amlwch, Anglesey to Carlingford, County Louth.
Alice Anna	United Kingdom	The schooner ran aground on the West Hoyle Bank, in Liverpool Bay. Her crew were rescued by the West Hoyle Lifeboat. She was on a voyage from Bangor, Caernarfonshire to Liverpool, Lancashire. She was reboarded and refloated the next day and taken in to Liverpool.
Celeste Caroline	France	The schooner was driven ashore and wrecked near St. Austell, Cornwall, United Kingdom with the loss of all hands. She was on a voyage from Charlestown, Cornwall to Nantes, Loire-Inférieure.
Dayspring	United Kingdom	The brigantine ran aground on the Broomhill Shoals, off the coast of County Waterford and was wrecked with the loss of five of her six crew. Her captain was rescued by the Duncannon Lifeboat. She was on a voyage from Newcastle upon Tyne, Northumberland to Waterford.
Drumduff	United Kingdom	The steamship was abandoned in the Atlantic Ocean. She was on a voyage from Philadelphia, Pennsylvania, United States to Antwerp, Belgium. She subsequently came ashore on the coast of Pennsylvania and was wrecked.
Earl of Ulster	United Kingdom	The steamship was driven ashore at Jurby Point, Isle of Man. She was on a voyage from Belfast to Fleetwood, Lancashire. She was refloated and resumed her voyage.
Emmanuel	United Kingdom	The schooner was driven ashore and wrecked at Fort Blockhouse, Gosport, Hampshire. Her crew were rescued.
Eothen	United Kingdom	The brig was abandoned in the Bristol Channel. She was subsequently driven ashore at Sandy Haven, Pembrokeshire. She was refloated with the assistance of the steamship Frank Stanley (United Kingdom) and towed in to Milford Haven, Pembrokeshire.
Falcon	(United Kingdom of Great Britain and Ireland) Isle of Man	The fishing lugger was driven ashore and wrecked at Kingstown, County Dublin. Her seven crew survived.
Fanny	United Kingdom	The fishing vessel was driven ashore and wrecked at Baldoyle, County Dublin.
Gothen	United Kingdom	The ship was driven ashore in Sandy Haven and was abandoned by her crew. She was refloated and towed in to Milford Haven, Pembrokeshire by the steamship Frank Stanley (United Kingdom).
Helmi	Russia	The barque was driven ashore and wrecked at Roche's Point. Her eleven crew were rescued by rocket apparatus. She was on a voyage from Cardiff, Glamorgan, United Kingdom to Naples, Italy.
John Masterman	United Kingdom	The barque was abandoned off the Leman Sand, in the North Sea. Her crew were rescued by smacks. She was on a voyage from Pensacola, Florida, United States to Wisbech, Cambridgeshire.
Juno	United Kingdom	The schooner was run down and sunk in the English Channel 4 nautical miles (7.4 km) east of the Royal Sovereign Lightship ( Trinity House) by the steamship Lady Ruthven (United Kingdom) with the loss of three of her five crew. Survivors were rescued by Lady Ruthven. Juno was on a voyage from Fowey, Cornwall to Newcastle upon Tyne, Northumberland.
Lucie	France	The sloop was driven ashore at Bray, County Wicklow, United Kingdom. Her crew were rescued. She was on a voyage from Nantes, Loire-Inférieure to Dublin.
Margaret Owen	United Kingdom	The schooner was driven ashore and wrecked at Ringfadd Point, County Down. Her crew survived. She was on a voyage from London to Londonderry.
Mary	United Kingdom	The schooner was driven ashore near Larne, County Antrim. She was on a voyage from Dublin to Coleraine, County Antrim.
Mary Cook	United Kingdom	The smack was abandoned off Girvan, Ayrshire. Both people on board were rescued by the Girvan Lifeboat.
Pawcett	United Kingdom	The ship was driven ashore between Fair Head and "Carrickmore Bridge", County Antrim.
Prince	United Kingdom	The schooner was driven ashore at Rye Harbour, Sussex. She was on a voyage from Porthleven, Cornwall to London.
Queen of Usk	United Kingdom	The brigantine was abandoned off Douglas, Isle of Man. Her crew were rescued by the Douglas Lifeboat.
Royal Charter	United Kingdom	The schooner was wrecked 8 nautical miles (15 km) north of Bardsey Island, Pembrokeshire. Her crew were rescued. She was on a voyage from Dublin to Port Madoc, Caernarfonshire.
Saxon	United Kingdom	The brigantine was driven into the suspension bridge at Montrose, Forfarshire and damaged.
Shamrock	United Kingdom	The ship was driven ashore at Hartlepool, County Durham. Her crew were rescued by the Hartlepool Lifeboat. Shamrock was on a voyage from Hartlepool to Scarborough, Yorkshire. She was refloated with the assistance of tugs but consequently sank.
Slieve Donard	United Kingdom	The ship was severely damaged by fire at Calcutta, India.
Swift	United Kingdom	The trow sank in the River Avon. Her crew survived.
Topaz	United Kingdom	The schooner ran aground on Brigg's Reef, off the coast of County Down. Her crew survived.
Una	United Kingdom	The schooner struck the Tayleur Rock and foundered off Lambay Island, County Dublin. Her four crew were rescued. She was on a voyage from Belfast to Portmadoc, Caernarfonshire.
Victoria	United Kingdom	The ferry, a paddle steamer, was driven against the pier at Tranmere, Cheshire and was severely damaged. She was scuttled.
Victorine	France	The brigantine was driven ashore at Mevagissey, Cornwall with the loss of two of her six crew. She was on a voyage from Nantes, Loire-Inférieure to Porthcawl, Glamorgan.
West Riding	United Kingdom	The steamship was run into by the steamship Henry (United Kingdom) in St. Ives Bay. She out in to Newport, Monmouthshire waterlogged at the bow.
Unnamed	Flag unknown	The schooner was driven ashore at Hartlepool. Her crew were rescued.
Thirteen unnamed vessels	Flags unknown	The ships were driven ashore at Bangor, Caernarfonshire.
Two unnamed vessels	(United Kingdom of Great Britain and Ireland) Isle of Man	The Manx nickeys foundered off the Isle of Man. One was lost with all hands.

== 4 March ==
List of shipwrecks: 4 March 1881
Ship	State	Description
Alert	United Kingdom	The steamship was driven ashore at Beaumaris, Anglesey.
All Right	United Kingdom	The schooner was abandoned in Cardigan Bay. Her crew were rescued by the steamship Maria (United Kingdom).
Ariadne	Denmark	The barque collided with USS Shenandoah (United States Navy) and was severely damaged. She put back to Montevideo, Uruguay, where she was beached. She was condemned.
Bangalore	United Kingdom	The barque was abandoned at sea. Her twelve crew were rescued by the steamship Foxhound (United Kingdom). Bangalore was on a voyage from Liverpool, Lancashire to Galle, Ceylon.
Castlemaine	United Kingdom	The ship was driven ashore at Ballyhalbert Bay, County Down. Her crew were rescued by the Ballywalter Lifeboat. She was on a voyage from Rangoon, Burma to Greenock, Renfrewshire.
Cecelia	United Kingdom	The barque foundered off Souter Point, Northumberland with the loss of all eighteen crew. She was on a voyage from the River Tyne to Valparaíso, Chile.
Charles	United Kingdom	The schooner was driven ashore between Beaumaris and Penmaenmawr, Caernarfonshire.
Chimera	United Kingdom	The schooner was driven ashore at Hartlepool, County Durham. She was refloated with assistance.
Chesapeake	United Kingdom	The steamship ran ashore in the River Thames at Grays, Essex.
City of London	United Kingdom	The steamship sank south of Gurneh, Egypt. Her crew were rescued.
Coronella	United Kingdom	The ship ran aground at Larne, County Antrim. She was on a voyage from Whitehaven, Cumberland to Dublin.
Corsair	United Kingdom	The steamship was driven ashore and wrecked at Stonehaven, Aberdeenshire. Her crew were rescued.
Eugene Desirée	France	The schooner was driven ashore and wrecked at "Collydrain", on the Mull of Kintyre, Argyllshire, United Kingdom with the loss of a crew member. She was on a voyage from Ardrossan, Ayrshire, United Kingdom to Saint-Malo, Ille-et-Vilaine.
Flora	United Kingdom	The Mersey flat was driven ashore between Beaumaris and Penmaenmawr.Her crew were rescued.
Florence Nightingale	United Kingdom	The ship was driven ashore at Middlesbrough, Yorkshire. She was refloated with the assistance of seven tugs and taken in to Middlesbrough.
Great Britain	United Kingdom	The schooner sprang a leak and was abandoned in the Irish Sea with the loss of a crew member. Survivors were rescued by the steamship Severn (United Kingdom). Great Britain was on a voyage from Port Madoc, Caernarfonshire to Plymouth, Devon.
Harmony	United Kingdom	The smack was driven ashore between Beaumaris and Penmaenmawr.
Industry	United Kingdom	The brigantine was driven ashore and wrecked at Ardtole, County Down. Her crew survived.
Jane Sarah	United Kingdom	The smack was driven ashore between Beaumaris and Penmaenmawr.
Jeune Cereus	France	The lugger foundered in the English Channel off Start Point, Devon, United Kingdom. Her crew survived. She was on a voyage from Par, Cornwall, United Kingdom to Rouen, Seine-Inférieure.
Llama	United Kingdom	The steamship was driven ashore 6 nautical miles (11 km) south of the Corsewall Lighthouse, Wigtownshire. Her crew were rescued. She was on a voyage from Liverpool to Glasgow, Renfrewshire, or from Belfast, County Antrim to Greenock, Renfrewshire. She was refloated on 3 April and taken in to Stranraer, Wigtownshire for temporary repairs before being towed to Glasgow.
Mars	United Kingdom	The brig was driven ashore and wrecked at Aberdeen Her six crew were rescued; four by rocket apparatus and two by the Aberdeen Lifeboat. She was on a voyage from South Shields, County Durham to Aberdeen.
Mary Eliza	United Kingdom	The schooner was driven ashore and wrecked between Beaumaris and Penmaenmawr.
Messenger	United Kingdom	The dredging smack was driven ashore at Penmon, Anglesey. Her six crew survived.
Morning Light	United Kingdom	The brigantine was driven ashore and wrecked between Ballyhealy and Tacumshane, County Wexford with the loss of five of her seven crew. She was on a voyage from South Shields to Drogheda, County Louth.
Niels	Sweden	The schooner was wrecked in the River Tay. Her five crew were rescued by a lifeboat. She was on a voyage from Le Tréport, Seine-Inférieure to Leith, Lothian, United Kingdom.
Penmaen	United Kingdom	The ship was driven ashore between Beaumaris and Penmaenmawr.
Penmon	United Kingdom	The smack was driven ashore between Beaumaris and Penmaenmawr.
Perseverance	United Kingdom	The brigantine was driven ashore and wrecked at Ardtole, County Down. Her crew survived. She was on a voyage from Maryport, Cumberland to Dublin.
Philomena	France	The schooner was driven ashore and wrecked between Ballyhealy and Tacumshane with the loss of three of her six crew. She was on a voyage from Nantes, Loire-Inférieure to Glasgow.
Pinson	France	The lugger was driven ashore and wrecked between Ballyhealy and Tacumshane. Her crew were rescued. She was on a voyage from Port Talbot, Glamorgan, United Kingdom to Port Malines, Gironde.
Princess	United Kingdom	The ship was driven ashore between Beaumaris and Penmaenmawr.
Problem	United Kingdom	The ship was driven ashore between Beaumaris and Penmaenmawr.
Rescue	(United Kingdom of Great Britain and Ireland) Guernsey	The barquentine ran aground in the Thames Estuary. She was run into by the barquentine Despatch (United Kingdom) and sank with the loss of a crew member. Rescue was on a voyage from Guernsey to London.
Rob Roy	United Kingdom	The ship was driven ashore between Beaumaris and Penmaenmawr.
Royal Charter	United Kingdom	The smack was driven ashore between Beaumaris and Penmaenmawr.
Stamboul	United Kingdom	The barque was driven ashore on the coast of County Down.
Sultan	United Kingdom	The steamship collided with the steamship Marianne Briggs (United Kingdom) and sank in the Humber with the loss of one life. Survivors were rescued by a dredger. Sultan was on a voyage from Hamburg, Germany to Hull, Yorkshire. She was refloated the next day.
Vivid	United Kingdom	The schooner was wrecked at Langness, Isle of Man with the loss of all hands.
Why Not	United Kingdom	The brig was wrecked on the Skerry, off Peterhead, Aberdeenshire with the loss of all seven crew. She was on a voyage from the Firth of Forth to a French port.
William	United Kingdom	The ship was driven ashore and wrecked between Beaumaris and Penmaenmawr.
Unnamed	Flag unknown	The schooner was driven ashore on Puffin Island, Anglesey.
Unnamed	Flag unknown	The ship was driven ashore at Seaton, County Durham.
Unnamed	Flag unknown	The barque was driven ashore at Kilmore, County Wexford.

== 5 March ==
List of shipwrecks: 5 March 1881
Ship	State	Description
Agnes	United Kingdom	The schooner was wrecked at Montrose, Forfarshire. Her crew were rescued.
Alfred	United Kingdom	The ship was abandoned in the Atlantic Ocean. Her crew were rescued by Leopoldine Frade (Germany). Alfred was on a voyage from the Bull River to Plymouth, Devon.
Alice Burnyeat	United Kingdom	The ship was wrecked on the east coast of Scotland with the loss of all hands.
Amoret	United Kingdom	The brigantine was wrecked near Johnshaven, Kincardineshire with the loss of all hands.
Arabian	United Kingdom	The brig was driven ashore at Monifieth, Fife. Her crew refused an offer by the Broughty Ferry Lifeboat English Mechanic ( Royal National Lifeboat Institution) to take them off. Arabian was on a voyage from Gravesend, Kent to the Firth of Forth.
A. Strong	United Kingdom	The steamship was damaged by an onboard explosion off Penarth, Glamorgan. A crew member was severely wounded. She was on a voyage from Newport, Monmouthshire to Savona, Italy. She put in to Penarth.
Essen	Germany	The steamship was abandoned after she stranded on the Isle of Wight, United Kingdom.
Friendship	Flag unknown	The steamship was wrecked near Saint Andrews, Fife, United Kingdom. Her crew were rescued by the Saint Andrews Lifeboat.
Gloucester	United Kingdom	The fishing smack was driven ashore and wrecked at Dimlington, Yorkshire with the loss of two of her six crew.
Harmonie	Norway	The schooner was driven ashore and wrecked in St. Andrews Bay. Her five crew were rescued by the St. Andrews Lifeboat Ladies' Own ( Royal National Lifeboat Institution). Harmonie was on a voyage from Mandal to Bo'ness, Lothian, United Kingdom.
John Henry Keats	United Kingdom	The brigantine was wrecked at "Usan", Forfarshire. Her crew were rescued by rocket apparatus.
John Patten	United States	The ship was driven ashore and wrecked at Balbriggan, County Dublin, United Kingdom. She was on a voyage from Liverpool, Lancashire, United Kingdom to New Orleans, Louisiana.
Martin, or Merlin	United Kingdom	The barque went ashore at St Andrews, Fife, with the loss of eight or nine of her crew.
Norma	Norway	The ship was driven ashore and wrecked in Montrose Bay with the loss of one of her twelve crew. Survivors were rescued by the Montrose Lifeboat. She was on a voyage from Newcastle upon Tyne, Northumberland, United Kingdom to Bergen.
Soredderus	Norway	The ship was wrecked on the east coast of Scotland with the loss of five of her seven crew. She was on a voyage from Newcastle upon Tyne to Christiania.
Warrior	United Kingdom	The ship put in to Dunny Cove, County Cork in a sinking condition. She was on a voyage from Swansea, Glamorgan to Rio de Janeiro, Brazil. She was towed in to Queenstown, County Cork on 7 March in a severely leaky condition.
Unnamed	Flag unknown	The brig was driven ashore at the mouth of the River Tay. Her crew were rescued by a lifeboat.

== 6 March ==
List of shipwrecks: 6 March 1881
Ship	State	Description
Arpocrate	Italy	The ship was driven ashore between Bolt Head and Salcombe, Devon, United Kingdom with some loss of life.
Athol	United Kingdom	The schooner was driven ashore and wrecked at Wexford with the loss of one of her seven crew. Survivors were rescued by rocket apparatus.
August	Germany	The ship was driven ashore at Montrose, Forfarshire, United Kingdom. Her crew were rescued. She was on a voyage from Antwerp, Belgium to Newcastle upon Tyne, Northumberland.
Ben Rhydding	United Kingdom	The ship was driven ashore and wrecked 6 nautical miles (11 km) north of Aberdeen with the loss of all 30 crew.
Essen	Germany	The steamship was driven ashore at Rocken End, Isle of Wight, United Kingdom. Her twenty crew were rescued. She was on a voyage from Bilbao, Spain to Rotterdam, South Holland, Netherlands.
Flower o' Buchan	United Kingdom	The schooner was wrecked near Wick, Caithness. Her crew were rescued by rocket apparatus.
Frederick Pertises	Germany	The barque was driven ashore at Inverallochy, Aberdeenshire with the loss of ten of her eleven crew.
Frisch	Germany	The barque was abandoned in the North Sea off Great Yarmouth, Norfolk, United Kingdom. Her twelve crew were rescued by the steamship Westoe (United Kingdom). Frisch was discovered in a derelict condition by the steamship Genva (United Kingdom), which towed her in to Great Yarmouth.
Gilbert Thompson	United Kingdom	The barque ran aground and sank on the West Mouse Sand, off the coast of Anglesey with the loss of one of her 22 crew. She was on a voyage from Calcutta, India to Liverpool, Lancashire.
Glance	United Kingdom	The pilot cutter sank at Swansea, Glamorgan.
Havelock	United Kingdom	The ship was driven ashore and wrecked near Aberdeen.
Helen	United Kingdom	The ship was driven ashore near Aberdeen. Her crew were rescued. She was on a voyage from London to the River Tyne.
Joseph	Flag unknown	The ship was driven ashore and wrecked at Aberdeen with the loss of all hands.
Lady Beatrix	United Kingdom	The steamship was driven ashore at Whitburn, County Durham. She was refloated and taken in to Sunderland, County Durham.
Maldon	United Kingdom	The schooner was driven ashore at Cruden, Aberdeenshire. Her seven crew were rescued by rocket apparatus. She was on a voyage from Maldon, Essex to the River Tyne.
Merlin	United Kingdom	The ship foundered off St Andrews, Fife with the loss of all hands.
Norford and Trubey	United Kingdom	The schooner was driven ashore at the mouth of the River Don. Her seven crew were rescued by the Aberdeen Lifeboat. She was on a voyage from the River Tyne to Ancona, Italy. She was refloated on 19 March and towed in to Aberdeen.
Œnone	United Kingdom	The ship was driven ashore and wrecked 6 nautical miles (11 km) north of Aberdeen. She was on a voyage from Calcutta, India to Dundee, Forfarshire.
Wanderer	United Kingdom	The ship was driven ashore and wrecked near Aberdeen with the loss of all but one of her crew.

== 7 March ==
List of shipwrecks: 7 March 1881
Ship	State	Description
Dinorah	United Kingdom	The ship was driven ashore and wrecked east of Johnshaven, Kincardineshire with the loss of all hands.
Grasshopper	United Kingdom	The schooner was abandoned off Boarhills, Fife. Her sixteen crew were rescued by the St. Andrews Lifeboat.
Laura Ann	United Kingdom	The schooner was driven ashore at Flamborough Head, Yorkshire. Her crew survived. She was on a voyage from Ramsgate, Kent to Hartlepool, County Durham. She was later refloated and towed in to Bridlington, Yorkshire in a severely damaged condition. It was reported that she would be towed to Hartlepool for repairs.
Marathon	United Kingdom	The steamship departed from South Shields, County Durham for Constantinople, Ottoman Empire. No further trace, reported overdue.
Oliver	Germany	The ship was driven ashore near Crail, Fife, United Kingdom and was abandoned by her crew.
Princess Royal	United Kingdom	The schooner was wrecked at "Usan", Forfarshire with the loss of all hands.
Ranger	Norway	The brig was wrecked 3 nautical miles (5.6 km) south of Montrose, Forfarshire. Her six crew were rescued; four of them by rocket apparatus. She was on a voyage from Christiania, Norway to Leith, Lothian.
Volere	Italy	The barque was driven ashore between Bolt Head and Salcombe, Devon, United Kingdom with the loss of five of the fourteen people on board. Survivors were rescued by Ariel (United Kingdom).
Warrior	United Kingdom	The steamship caught fire at sea. She put in to Madeira. She was on a voyage from Maceió, Brazil to Liverpool, Lancashire.

== 8 March ==
List of shipwrecks: 8 March 1881
Ship	State	Description
Jupiter	United Kingdom	The barque was driven ashore at Goswick, Northumberland. All eighteen people on board were rescued by the Lindisfarne Lifeboat Grace Darling ( Royal National Lifeboat Institution). Jupiter was on a voyage from Hamburg, Germany to the River Tyne.

== 9 March ==
List of shipwrecks: 9 March 1881
Ship	State	Description
Lugar	United Kingdom	The ship ran aground and sank at Ayr. She was on a voyage from Ayr to Larne, County Antrim.

== 10 March ==
List of shipwrecks: 10 March 1881
Ship	State	Description
Lascelles	United Kingdom	The steamship ran aground in the Belfast Lough. She was on a voyage from Baltimore, Maryland, United States to Belfast, County Antrim.

== 11 March ==
List of shipwrecks: 11 March 1881
Ship	State	Description
Waitara	United Kingdom	The ship struck a sunken rock at Invercargill, New Zealand. She was on a voyage from Inverargill to London. Temporary repairs were made at Invercargill and she was taken in to Dundedin for permanent repairs.

== 12 March ==
List of shipwrecks: 12 March 1881
Ship	State	Description
Benin	United Kingdom	The steamship collided with the steamship Duke of Buccleugh (United Kingdom) and sank in the English Channel off Start Point, Devon (49°53′N 3°08′W). Her crew were rescued by Duke of Buccleuch. Benin was on a voyage from Havre de Grâce, Seine-Inférieure, France to Liverpool, Lancashire.
Java	United Kingdom	The ship ran aground at Fleetwood, Lancashire. She was on a voyage from the Glasson Dock, Lancashire to Cardiff, Glamorgan. She was refloated the next day and found to be severely leaky.

== 13 March ==
List of shipwrecks: 13 March 1881
Ship	State	Description
Craig	United Kingdom	The barque was driven ashore on the Mull of Kintyre, Argyllshire. She was on a voyage from Pensacola, Florida, United States to Greenock, Renfrewshire.

== 14 March ==
List of shipwrecks: 14 March 1881
Ship	State	Description
Emma and Mary	United Kingdom	The schooner was driven ashore at Lowestoft, Suffolk.
Undaunted	United Kingdom	The ship collided with Mary L. Wilbur (United Kingdom) at Belfast, County Antrim and was severely damaged. Undaunted was on a voyage from Belfast to Ayr.

== 15 March ==
List of shipwrecks: March 1881
Ship	State	Description
Benares	United Kingdom	The ship ran aground off "Garrete Point", Renfrewshire.
Mermaid	United Kingdom	The sloop ran aground at Aberdeen and sprang a leaky.

== 16 March ==
List of shipwrecks: 16 March 1881
Ship	State	Description
Emelva Wilhelmina	Netherlands	The ship was driven ashore at "Kewhurst", Sussex, United Kingdom.
Unnamed	United Kingdom	The barque foundered in the Atlantic Ocean (41°31′N 53°59′W) with the loss of all hands. Witnessed by Kintail ( Canada, which was unable to rescue her crew.

== 17 March ==
List of shipwrecks: 17 March 1881
Ship	State	Description
Margaret	United Kingdom	The ship was driven ashore at Lighthouse Point, County Antrim. She was on a voyage from Maryport, Cumberland to Londonderry.
Jane Hughes	United Kingdom	The ship was driven ashore and wrecked in Loch Eriboll with the loss of a crew member. She was on a voyage from Port Dinorwic, Caernarfonshire to Portsoy, Aberdeenshire.
Polly Preston	United Kingdom	The ship was driven ashore in Loch Eriboll. She was refloated.
Rosa Harriette	United Kingdom	The ship was driven ashore in Loch Eriboll and sank. She was on a voyage from Port Dinorwic to Montrose, Forfarshire.

== 18 March ==
List of shipwrecks: 18 March 1881
Ship	State	Description
Blue Jacket	United Kingdom	The schooner ran aground on the Dogger Bank, in the Irish Sea. She was on a voyage from Bangor, Caernarfonshire to Wexford. She was refloated with assistance the next day.
Kohinoor	United Kingdom	The schooner ran aground on McKinneys Bank, off the coast of County Donegal, and sank.
Pioneer	United Kingdom	The steamship was driven ashore and wrecked at Dumbarton Castle, Dunbartonshire. Her crew survived.
Planet	United Kingdom	The schooner ran aground in the Elbe at Schulau, Germany. She was on a voyage from Caernarfon to Hamburg, Germany. She was refloated and completed her voyage in a leaky condition.

== 19 March ==
List of shipwrecks: 19 March 1881
Ship	State	Description
Camel	United Kingdom	The steamship ran aground at the mouth of the River Usk whilst avoiding a collision with another vessel. She was on a voyage from Belfast, County Antrim to Newport, Monmouthshire. She was refloated.
Enterprise	United Kingdom	The Mersey Flat was driven ashore at Nittere Point, Cheshire. She was on a voyage from Queensferry, Flintshire to Liverpool, Lancashire.
Kepier	United Kingdom	The steamship put in to Grimsby, Lincolnshire on fire. She was on a voyage from Sunderland, County Durham to London.
Seewo	United Kingdom	The steamship put in to Aden, Aden Colony on fire. She was on a voyage from South Shields, County Durham to Singapore, Straits Settlements.
Vanguard	United States	The fishing schooner was wrecked at Rye Beach, New Hampshire. Her crew were rescued.

== 22 March ==
List of shipwrecks: 22 March 1881
Ship	State	Description
Avant	Netherlands	The brig was driven ashore at Rio Real, Brazil. She was on a voyage from the Rio Grande to Aracaju, Brazil. She was declared a total loss.
J. A. Jackson	United Kingdom	The ship was driven ashore at Swalecliffe, Kent. She was later refloated.

== 23 March ==
List of shipwrecks: 23 March 1881
Ship	State	Description
Carron Lighter No. 4	United Kingdom	The steam lighter collided with the steamship Glencoe (United Kingdom) and sank in the Carron Roads. Her crew were rescued by Glencoe.
Mette	Denmark	The brigantine ran aground and was wrecked at the mouth of the Rio Grande. Her crew were rescued. She was on a voyage from London, United Kingdom to the Rio Grande.

== 24 March ==
List of shipwrecks: 24 March 1881
Ship	State	Description
Clyde	United Kingdom	The brig ran aground on the Hook Sand, in the English Channel off the coast of Dorset.
Matilda	United Kingdom	The brig was wrecked in Loch Broom. Her crew were rescued. She was on a voyage from Mandal, Norway, to Liverpool, Lancashire.

== 25 March ==
List of shipwrecks: 25 March 1881
Ship	State	Description
Anna Colbjornsen	Norway	The barque foundered in the North Sea. Her crew were rescued by the fishing smack Pollux (Netherlands).
John o'Groat	United Kingdom	The steamship was driven ashore at Scrabster, Caithness. She was refloated on 14 April and taken in to Scrabster.
Lizzie K. Clark	United States	The fishing schooner capsized and sank about 20 nautical miles (37 km) southeast of Barnegat, New Jersey. The crew of fourteen men were rescued by the pilot boat No. 3 (United States).
Llanarthen	United Kingdom	The steamship ran aground at Bussorah, Persia. She was on a voyage from Cardiff, Glamorgan to Bussorah.
Terrifer	United Kingdom	The steamship ran aground at Aberdeen. She was refloated on 27 March.

== 28 March ==
List of shipwrecks: 28 March 1881
Ship	State	Description
Baron Osy	Belgium	The paddle steamer was driven ashore near Terneuzen, Zeeland, Netherlands. She was on a voyage from London, United Kingdom to Antwerp.
Galathea	Norway	The barque was driven ashore at Hull, Yorkshire, United Kingdom. She was refloated the next day.
Henriette Adriana	Netherlands	The ship was sighted off Anjer, Netherlands East Indies whilst on a voyage from Samarang, Netherlands East Indies to Rotterdam, South Holland. No further trace, reported missing.
Jane	United Kingdom	The schooner foundered in the Irish Sea 9 nautical miles (17 km) east north east of the Corsewall Lighthouse, Wigtownshire. Her crew survived.

== 29 March ==
List of shipwrecks: 29 March 1881
Ship	State	Description
Brothers	United Kingdom	The smack struck the Bass Rock, off the south Devon coast, and foundered and foundered. Her crew survived.
Elwin	United Kingdom	The Thames barge was driven ashore and severely damaged.

== 30 March ==
List of shipwrecks: 30 March 1881
Ship	State	Description
Geraldine	United Kingdom	The schooner sank in Port Eynon Bay off Swansea, Glamorgan. Her crew survived.
Hero	United Kingdom	The steamship struck a sunken rock and sprang a leak whilst on a voyage from Hull, Yorkshire to Copenhagen, Denmark. She completed her voyage.
Seelust	Germany	The schooner ran aground off Lydd, Kent, United Kingdom and was wrecked. Her crew were rescued by rocket apparatus.
Unnamed	Sweden	The schooner sank off Cap Arcona, Rügen, Germany. There was at least one casualty and at least six survivors.

== 31 March ==
List of shipwrecks: 31 March 1881
Ship	State	Description
Americaine	France	The fishing vessel was wrecked on the coast of Iceland. Her crew were rescued.
Diamantina	New South Wales	The steamship ran aground at the mouth of the Manning River and was severely damaged.
Eliza	United Kingdom	The ship was abandoned off the north Kent coast. She was taken in to Whitstable in a severely leaky condition by the smack Star (United Kingdom).
Marie	France	The fishing vessel was wrecked on the coast of Iceland. Her crew were rescued.

== Unknown date ==
List of shipwrecks: Unknown date in March 1881
Ship	State	Description
Acorn	United Kingdom	The schooner ran aground at Larne, County Antrim. She was on a voyage from Dublin to Larne. She was refloated.
Alfred	United Kingdom	The ship was towed in to Bermuda in a derelict condition before 22 March.
Anna Colbjornsen	Norway	The ship foundered before 30 March. Her crew were rescued. She was on a voyage from Charlestown, Cornwall, United Kingdom to Fredrikshald.
Ariel	United Kingdom	The schooner ran aground on the Vogelsand, in the North Sea off the German coast. She was on a voyage from Port Madoc, Caernarfonshire to Hamburg, Germany. She floated off but consequently sank.
Auguste	Flag unknown	The ship ran aground on the Romer Shoal. She was on a voyage from Bremen, Germany to New York. She was refloated with assistance.
Aurora	United Kingdom	The schooner ran aground on the Pennington Spit, in the Solent. She was on a voyage from Fowey, Cornwall to Fareham, Hampshire. She was later refloated and resumed her voyage.
Black Diamond	United Kingdom	The steamship collided with Dredger (United Kingdom) and ran aground at Hartlepool, County Durham. She was on a voyage from Hartlepool to London. She was refloated with the assistance of a number of tugs.
Celine	France	The barque was driven ashore and wrecked on the Brazilian coast before 28 March. Her crew were rescued. She was on a voyage from Cádiz, Spain to the Rio Grande.
Criterion	United States	The full-rigged ship was driven ashore on the German coast. She was on a voyage from New York to Bremen, Germany.
Cwmavon	United Kingdom	The schooner struck a sunken rock in the Sound of Islay and was beached at "Holme Ferry".
Darent	United Kingdom	The steamship ran aground on the Roche Lament, off Lorient, Morbihan, France. She was on a voyage from Constanţa, United Principalities to Lorient.
Dolphin	United Kingdom	The fishing smack was driven ashore at Caister-on-Sea, Norfolk.
Dupuy de Lome	France	The barque was driven ashore on the French coast. She was on a voyage from Saint-Louis, Senegal to Dunkerque, Nord. She was later refloated and taken in to Boulogne, Pas-de-Calais in a leaky condition.
Eagle Wing	United Kingdom	The schooner was driven ashore at Orford, Suffolk. Her crew were rescued. She was on a voyage from London to Stockton-on-Tees, County Durham. She was refloated the next day and taken in to Harwich, Essex.
Elizabeth	United Kingdom	The schooner foundered off Boulmer, Northumberland with the loss of all hands.
Emanuel	United Kingdom	The schooner was driven ashore and sank at Black House Point, Hampshire. Her crew were rescued. She was on a voyage from Portsmouth to Southampton.
Emily Mary	United Kingdom	The Mersey Flat struck the landing stage at Wallasey, Cheshire and sank.
Falcon	Falkland Islands	The schooner was wrecked on the Isla de los Estados, Argentina before 6 March. Her crew were rescued. She was on a voyage from the Falkland Islands to Montevideo, Uruguay.
Francis Jane	United Kingdom	The ship ran aground at "Brackley Point". She was on a voyage from Glasgow, Renfrewshire to Belfast.
Friedrich Perthes	Germany	The ship was driven ashore and wrecked at Inverallochy, Aberdeenshire, United Kingdom with the loss of one of her twelve crew. Survivors were rescued by rocket apparatus. She was on a voyage from Wilmington, North Carolina, United States to Granton, Lothian.
Geneva	United States	The ship was driven ashore in Lower New York Bay. She was on a voyage from New York to Buenos Aires, Argentina. She was refloated and resumed her voyage.
Guilio Anna	Italy	The barque ran aground on a sunken wreck at New York.
Gulnare	United States	The steamship collided with the schooner Charles Morford (United States) and was severely damaged. Gulnare was on a voyage from Baltimore, Maryland to Cárdenas, Cuba. She put back to Baltimore.
Harvest King	United Kingdom	The schooner was driven ashore in the Elbe upstream of Cuxhaven, Germany. She was on a voyage from Plymouth, Devon to Hamburg.
Jeannie	United Kingdom	The steamship was driven ashore at Cape Trafalgar, Spain.
Jessie	United Kingdom	The Mersey Flat collided with British King (United Kingdom) and sank at Liverpool.
Kinderdijk	Netherlands	The ship ran aground in Port Philip Bay. She was on a voyage from Java, Netherlands East Indies to Melbourne, Victoria. She was refloated and completed her voyage.
Lincolnshire	United Kingdom	The ship ran aground at Bermuda.
Livorno	Italy	The steamship struck the sea wall at "Alte Lube", Germany and was severely damaged. She was on a voyage from Catania, Sicily to Hamburg.
Lovell	United Kingdom	The fishing cutter was driven ashore on Vlieland, Friesland, Netherlands.
Madras	United Kingdom	The ship was wrecked at Bermuda. She was on a voyage from Pensacola, Florida, United States to Greenock.
Maggie Figlia	Flag unknown	The ship was abandoned in the Atlantic Ocean before 25 March and subsequently caught fire. Her rew were rescued by Tony Krogman (Flag unknown). Maggie Figlia was on a voyage from Sligo, United Kingdom to New York.
Milford	United Kingdom	The smack was driven ashore and wrecked in Lough Swilly at "Knockallow". Her crew were rescued. She was on a voyage from Belfast, County Antrim to Mulroy Bay, County Donegal.
Milton	United States	The ship ran aground on the Lyseground. She was on a voyage from New York to Copenhagen, Denmark. She was later refloated with assistance.
Nellie	United Kingdom	The schooner ran aground at Saint-Malo, Ille-et-Vilaine, France. She was on a voyage from Guernsey, Channel Islands to Schiedam, South Holland, Netherlands. She was refloated and found to be severely leaky.
Nettle	United Kingdom	The ship was driven ashore on Vlieland. Her crew were rescued. She was declared a total loss.
Niels	Sweden	The schooner was driven ashore between Broughty Ferry, Forfarshire and Monifieth, Fife, United Kingdom. Her five crew were rescued by the Broughty Ferry Lifeboat English Mechanic ( Royal National Lifeboat Institution). Niels was on a voyage from Le Tréport, Seine-Inférieure to Leith, Lothian
Oscar	United Kingdom	The steamship struck rocks at Redcar, Yorkshire. She was on a voyage from Bilbao, Spain to Stockton-on-Tees, County Durham. She was refloated with assistance from two tugs and taken in to Stockton-on-Tees.
Pride of Anglesey	United Kingdom	The schooner was driven ashore and wrecked in Culdoff Bay. Her crew survived.
Prince	United Kingdom	The schooner was driven ashore at Rye Harbour, Sussex.
Princess Royal	United Kingdom	The schooner was driven ashore and wrecked in Luce Bay.
Progressa	Spain	The brigantine was abandoned at sea before 7 March. Her crew were rescued. She was on a voyage from Santander to Seville.
Providencia	Mexico	The ship was driven ashore at Puerto Ángel. She was a total loss.
Royal Eagle	United Kingdom	The ship was wrecked in Cruden Bay. Her crew were rescued by rocket apparatus.
Sarah Ann	United Kingdom	The brigantine was wrecked before 15 March. Her crew were rescued. She was on a voyage from Aracaju, Brazil to the English Channel.
Soto	Spain	The steamship ran aground at Maassluis, South Holland. She was on a voyage from Spain to Rotterdam, South Holland. She was refloated.
St. Clair	United Kingdom	The brig was driven ashore at Zoutelande, Zeeland, Netherlands. Her crew were rescued by a tug. She was on a voyage from Newcastle upon Tyne to Middelburg, Zeeland.
Summerlee	United Kingdom	The ship was driven ashore on Ailsa Craig. She was on a voyage from Bilbao to Glasgow. She was refloated on 29 March.
Syringa	Flag unknown	The ship was driven ashore on the coast of Maryland, United States. Her crew were rescued.
Tartar	United Kingdom	The fishing cutter was driven ashore on Vlieland.
Tell Tale	United Kingdom	The schooner ran aground on the Holmes, in the Bristol Channel. She was on a voyage from Penzance, Cornwall to Bristol, Gloucestershire. She was refloated and beached on the Swash, being in a leaky condition.
Torto	Norway	The barque collided with the steamship Thanemore (United Kingdom) and was severely damaged. Torto was on a voyage from Baltimore to Liverpool.
Tullochgorm	United Kingdom	The ship was holed by ice and sank in the Elbe upstream of Brunsbüttel, Germany.
Valpurga	Denmark	The schooner was holed by ice and sank in the Elbe upstream of Brunsbüttel after 10 March. Her crew were rescued.
Warnee	France	The ship ran aground at Wicklow, United Kingdom and sprang a leak. She was on a voyage from Dunkerque to Cardiff.
William	United Kingdom	The schooner sprang a severe leak and was beached. She was on a voyage from Eling, Hampshire to Shoreham-by-Sea, Sussex.
William Connal	United Kingdom	The steamship collided with a hopper barge at Glasgow and sank.
Unnamed	United States	The steamship was driven ashore at Algeciras, Spain.
Unnamed	Flag unknown	The schooner collided with the steamship Leversons (United Kingdom) and sank off the coast of Maryland with the loss of three of her crew.
