= Ballee, County Down =

Civil parish in County Down, Northern Ireland

Ballee is a civil parish in County Down, Northern Ireland. It is situated mainly in the historic barony of Lecale Lower, with one townland in the barony of Lecale Upper.

== Townlands ==
Ballee civil parish contains the following townlands:

- Ballyalton
- Ballybrannagh Lower
- Ballybrannagh Upper
- Ballyclander Lower
- Ballyclander Upper
- Ballycruttle
- Ballyhosset
- Ballyhosset Milltown
- Ballymurry
- Ballynagross Lower
- Ballynagross Upper
- Ballyrenan
- Ballysallagh
- Ballystokes
- Ballytrustan
- Ballywalter
- Carrowbaghran
- Carrownacaw
- Church Ballee
- Dillin
- Jordans Crew
- Kildares Crew
- Loughmoney
- Slievenagriddle
- Spittle Ballee
- Spittle Quarter

== See also ==
- List of civil parishes of County Down
