= Tullycarnan =

Townland in County Down, Northern Ireland

Coordinates: 54°15′35″N 5°37′36″W

Tullycarnan: Irish: Tulaigh Charnáin
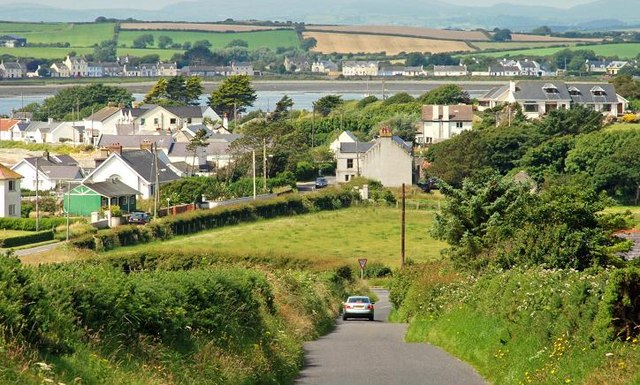
- The Green Road, Tullycarnan, near Ardglass

- Location within Northern Ireland Location within County Down Tullycarnan (County Down)
- Irish grid reference: J560370
- District: Newry, Mourne and Down
- County: County Down
- Country: Northern Ireland
- Sovereign state: United Kingdom
- Post town: DOWNPATRICK
- Postcode district: BT30
- Dialling code: 028
- UK Parliament: South Down
- NI Assembly: South Down

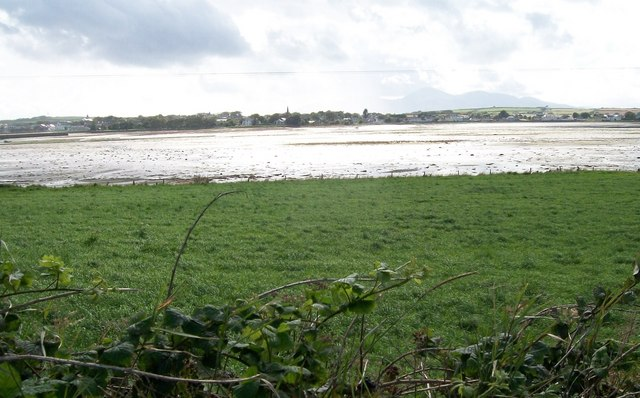
The head of Killough Harbour from Curlew point

Tullycarnan (from Irish Tulaigh Charnáin, meaning 'hillock of the little cairn') is a townland of 154 acres in County Down, Northern Ireland. To the west of Ardglass village, it is in the civil parish of Ardglass and the historic barony of Lecale Lower.

The name of the townland of Tullycarnan has appeared in historical records under different spellings, including "Tolecarnan" in 1649 and "Tullycarmon" in 1795, both associated with the Ardglass area. The name is derived from the Irish Tulaigh Charnáin, meaning "hillock of the little cairn". A prominent hillock is located within the townland, overlooking Curlew Point. However, there is currently no visible trace or documented record of a cairn at the site. Portions of the lower-lying land in Tullycarnan, similar to areas surrounding Killough Harbour, may have been reclaimed from a bay that historically extended further inland.

== Geography ==
Townlands that border Tullycarnan include:

- Ardglass to the east
- Coney Island to the east
- Kildare's Crew to the west
- Ringfad to the east
