= Ballyculter =

Civil parish in County Down, Northern Ireland

Ballyculter is a civil parish in County Down, Northern Ireland. It is situated in the historic barony of Lecale Lower.

== Settlements ==
The civil parish contains the following settlements:

- Strangford

== Townlands ==
Ballyculter civil parish contains the following townlands:

- Audleystown
- Ballintlieve
- Ballyculter Lower
- Ballyculter Upper
- Ballylenagh
- Cargagh
- Carrintaggart
- Castlemahon
- Castleward
- Chapel Island
- Ferryquarter
- Jackdaw Island
- Killard Lower
- Killard Upper
- Lagnagoppoge
- Loughkeelan
- Raholp
- Strangford Lower
- Strangford Upper
- Tullyratty

== See also ==
- List of civil parishes of County Down
