= Jordan's Castle =

Coordinates: 54.260°N 5.609°W

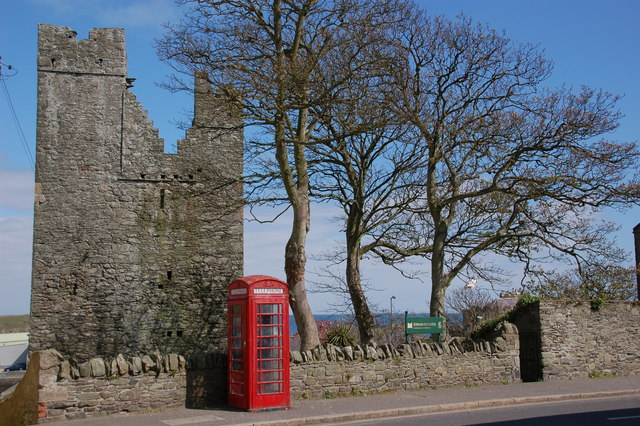
Jordan's Castle

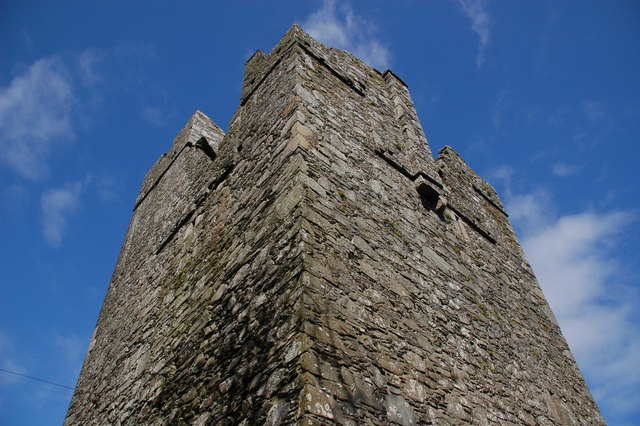
Jordan's Castle tower

Jordan's Castle (Irish: Caisleán MacSiurtain; Ulster Scots: Joardan's Kessel) is a castle situated in Ardglass, County Down, Northern Ireland. The tower house known as Jordan's Castle is a State Care Historic Monument sited in the townland of Ardglass, in the Newry, Mourne and Down District Council area, at grid ref: J5601 3713. It stands close to the junction of Kildare and Quay Streets in Ardglass and commands the harbour.

== Features ==
The entrance is at the bottom of the north-west tower and leads to a spiral stairway to roof level. It is protected by a machicolation at that level.

The Dublin Penny Journal of 30 March 1833 describes Jordan's Castle as follows:

Of the remaining fortresses, the most remarkable is that called Jordan's Castle, which, though inferior in size to the King's Castle, is yet constructed with greater elegance than that, or any of the other buildings of the kind, and was a place of considerable strength. It is situated in the centre of the town, and appears to have been the citadel. This castle is memorable for the gallant defence made by its owner Simon Jordan, who, in the Tyrone rebellion, held it out for three years, till he was relieved by the Lord Deputy Mountjoy, on the 17th of June, 1601, who rewarded him for this service, both by a concordatum from the Queen and his own private bounty.

== History ==
It was also extensively used for get-togethers of the wide circle of Irish Cultural revival artists and writers to whom Bigger was friend and patron. Following suggestions by Alice Stopford Green and the archivist Henry Egan Kenny, Bigger renamed the tower "Castle Seán' in honour of the two years when Shane O'Neill (Seán Ó Néill) controlled Ardglass, and they believed, re-fortified the tower following his defeat of the MacDonnells at Glentaisie in 1565. The contents have since been dispersed among the Ulster Museums general collections and the tower is no longer open to the public.

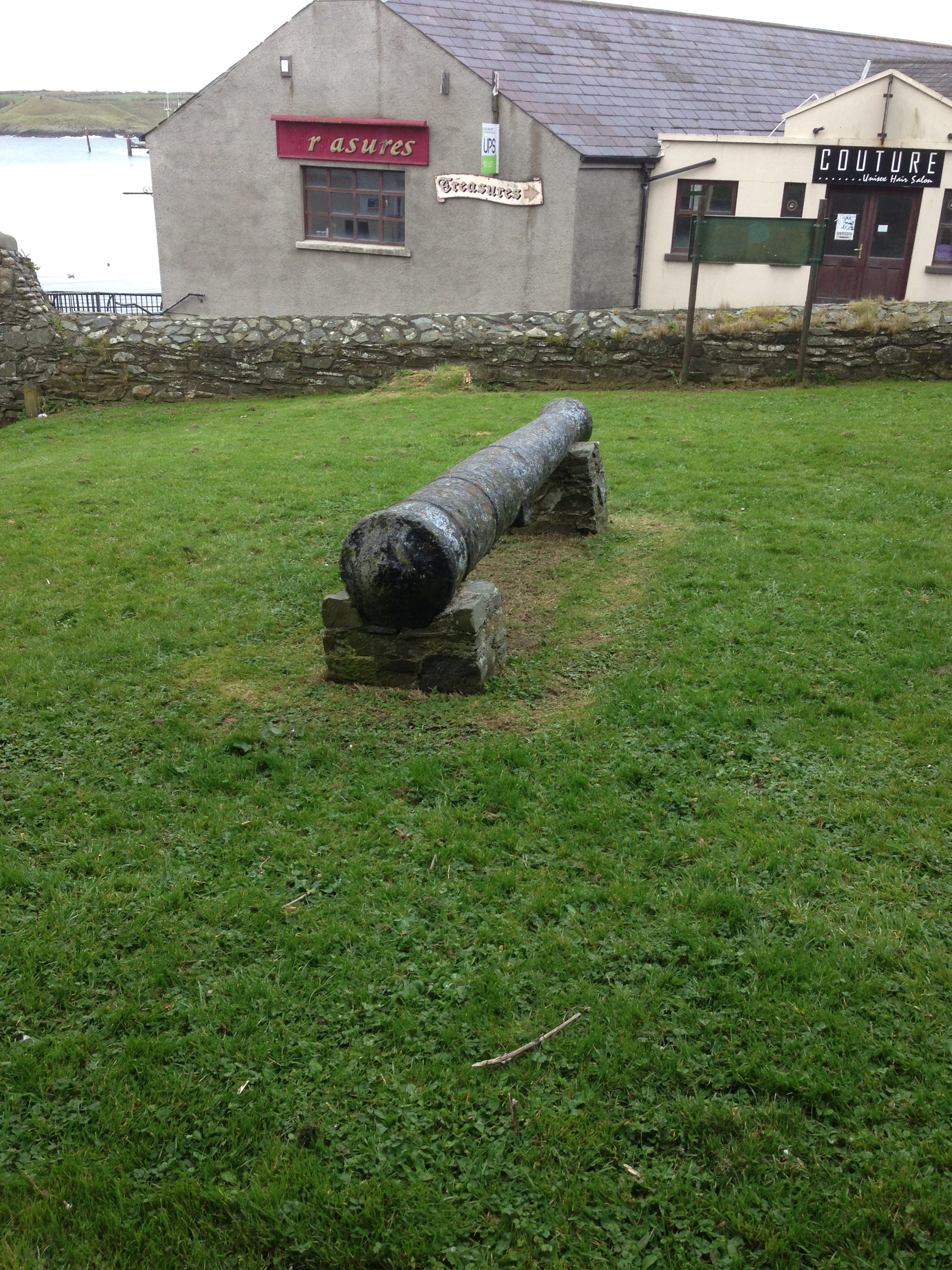
Cannon from French ship sent to supply guns to the United Irishmen, wrecked off Ardglass – located in front of Jordan's Castle

Ardglass had at least six castles and remains of four of them can still be seen: Ardglass Castle, Cowd Castle, Margaret's Castle and Jordan's Castle.

== See also ==
- List of castles in Ireland
