= Inch, County Down =

Civil parish in County Down, Northern Ireland

Coordinates: 54.37°N 5.74°W

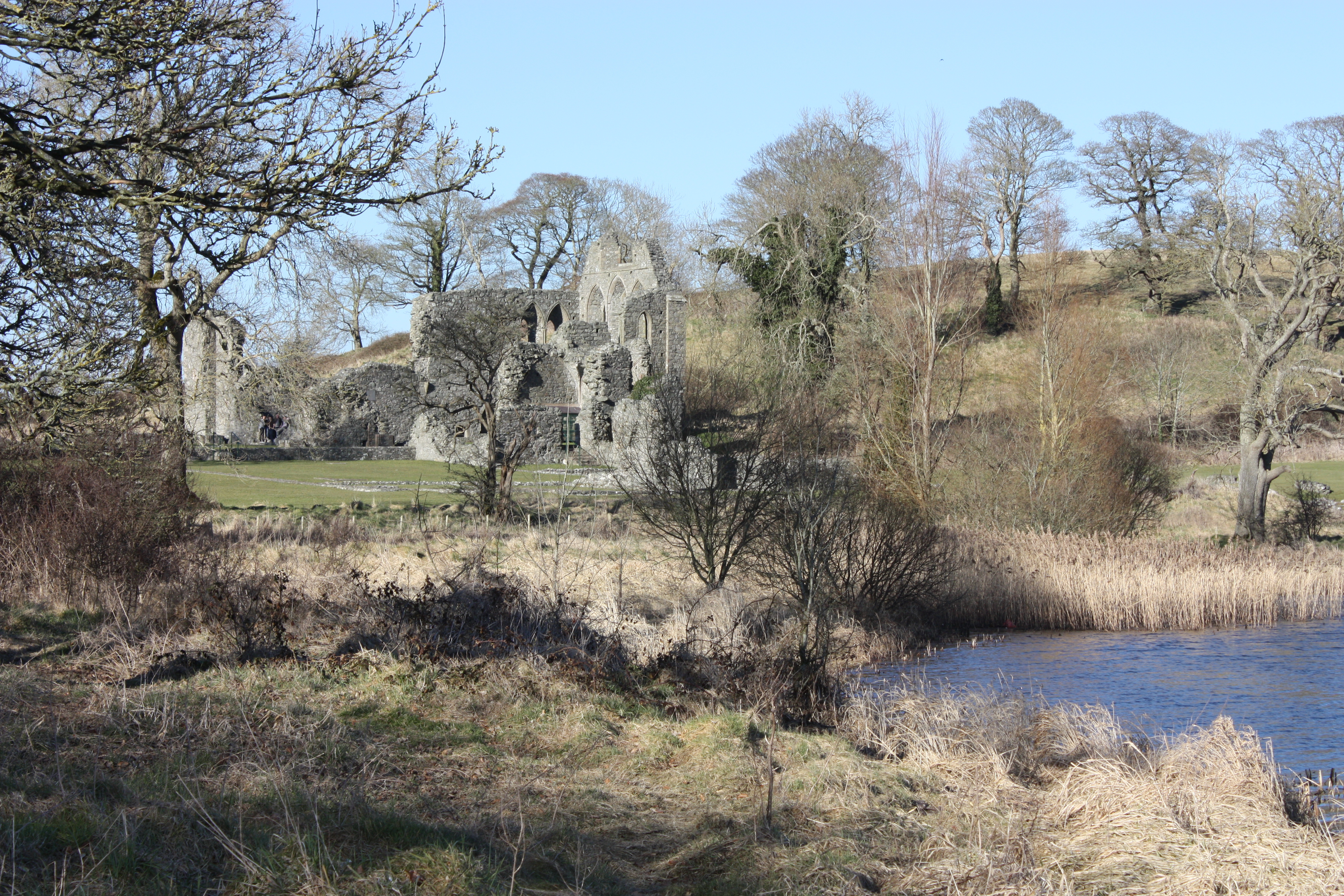
Inch Abbey ruins alongside the River Quoile (March 2010)

Inch (Irish: Inis) is a civil parish in County Down, Northern Ireland. It is situated in the historic barony of Lecale Lower. It shares its name with Inch townland, which has an area of approximately 560 acres (0.9 sq mi). Inch Abbey is located within the civil parish and townland of Inch.

== Townlands ==
Inch civil parish contains the following townlands:

- Annacloy
- Ballygally
- Ballynacraig
- Ballyrenan
- Dunnanelly
- Finnabrogue
- Inch
- Magheracranmoney
- Shuters Islands
- Turmennan

== See also ==
- List of civil parishes of County Down
- Inch Abbey railway station
