= Dillin =

Dillin is a surname. Notable people with the surname include:

- Andrew Dillin, American medical investigator
- Dick Dillin (1928–1980), American comics artist
- Matt Dillon (born 1964), American actor and director
- Samuel Hugh Dillin (1914–2006), American judge

== See also ==
- Dillon (disambiguation)
