= King's Castle, Ardglass =

Castle in County Down, Northern Ireland

Coordinates: 54.2595°N 5.6078°W

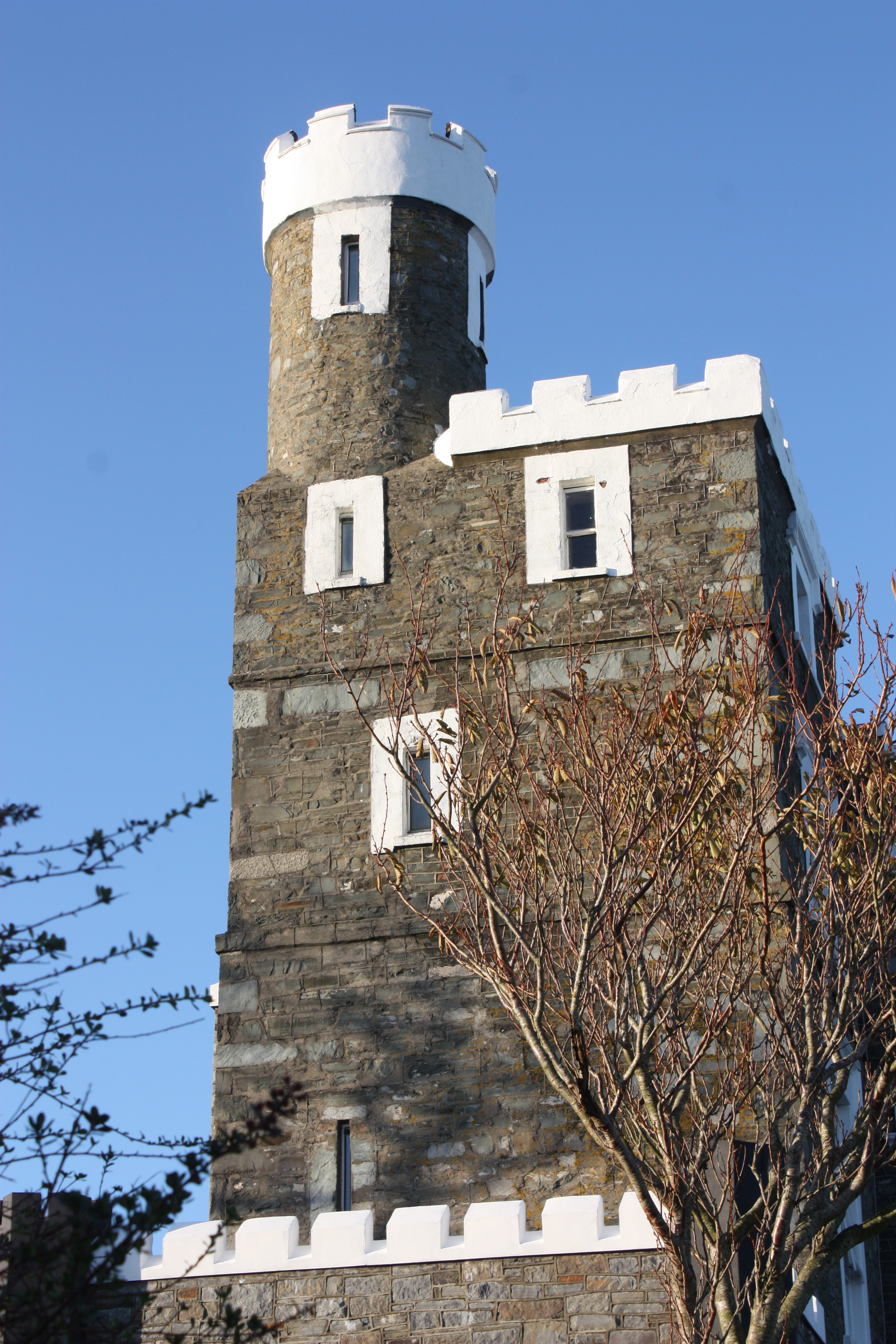
Kings Castle Nursing Home, November 2010

King's Castle (Irish: Caisleán an Rí, Ulster Scots: Käng's Kessel) is a castle in Ardglass, County Down, Northern Ireland. It was originally built in the 12th century and additions were made at various times over the centuries. It was rebuilt in the 19th century to the original specifications after parts of it collapsed in 1830 during repairs to the castle's foundation: restoration finished in 1988 and the castle opened as a nursing home and remains one today.

== History ==
The Dublin Penny Journal of 30 March 1833 describes King's Castle as follows:

... the largest of the many ancient castles of Ardglass, and is popularly known by the name of "the King's Castle." It was a fortress of considerable size and strength; but is at present much dilapidated, and falling to decay.

== See also ==
- Castles in Northern Ireland
