= Ardglass =

Fishing village in County Down, Northern Ireland

Coordinates: 54.253°N 5.601°W

Ardglass: Irish: Ard Ghlais
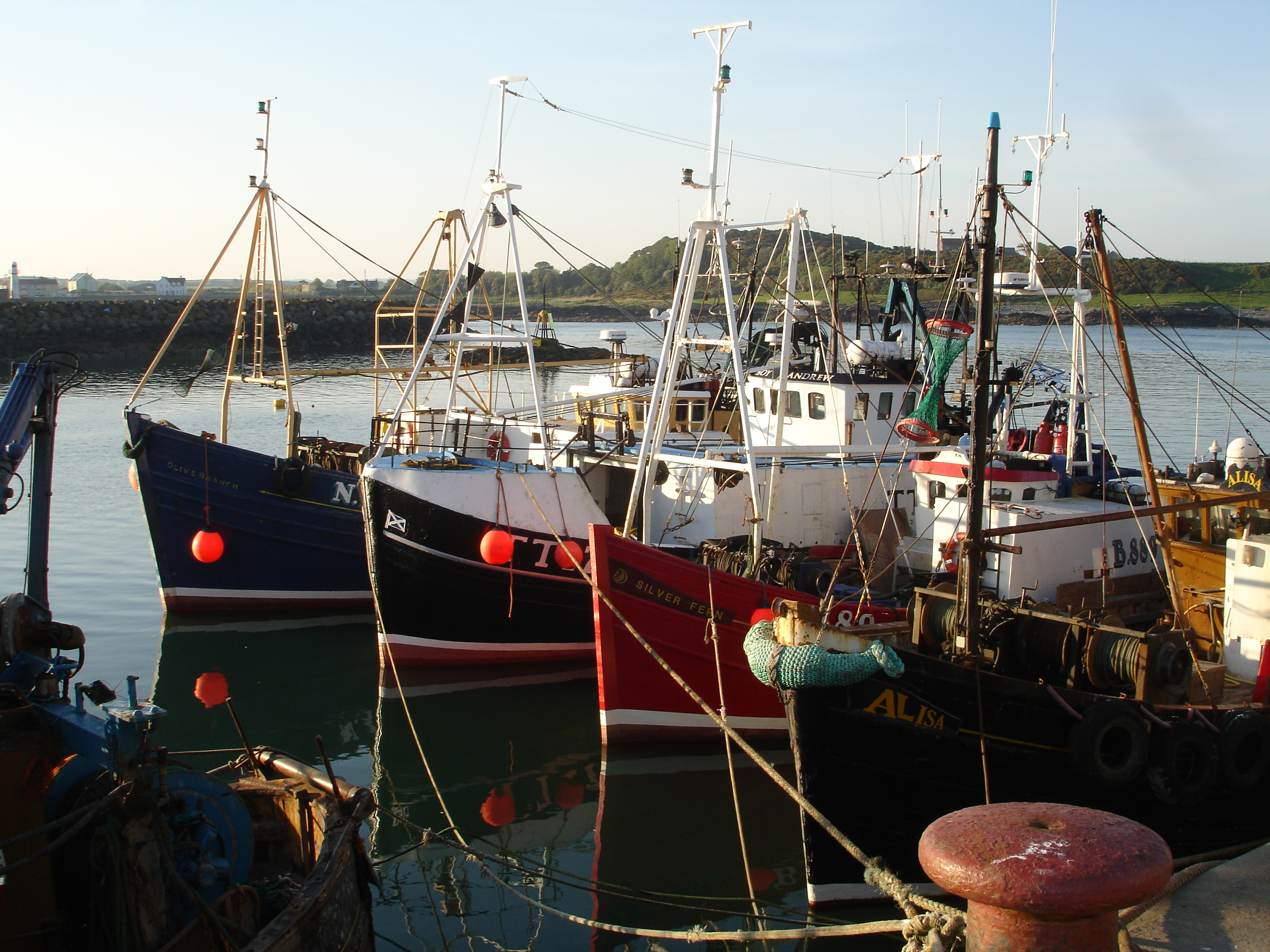
- Ardglass Harbour, May 2009

- Location within County Down
- Population: 1,761 (2021 census)
  - Belfast: 34.1 mi
- District: Newry, Mourne and Down
- County: County Down
- Country: Northern Ireland
- Sovereign state: United Kingdom
- Post town: DOWNPATRICK
- Postcode district: BT30
- Dialling code: 028
- UK Parliament: South Down
- NI Assembly: South Down

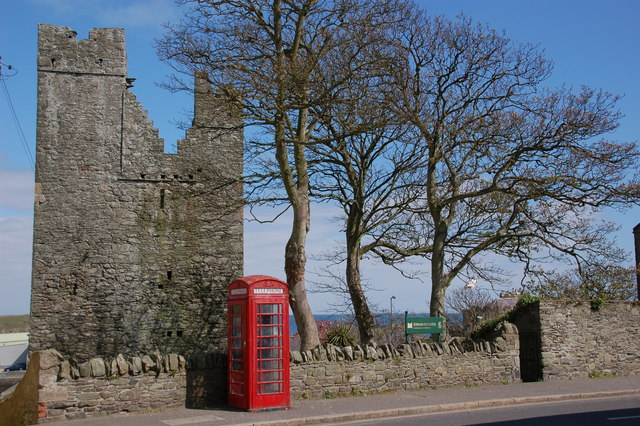
Jordan's Castle, 2007

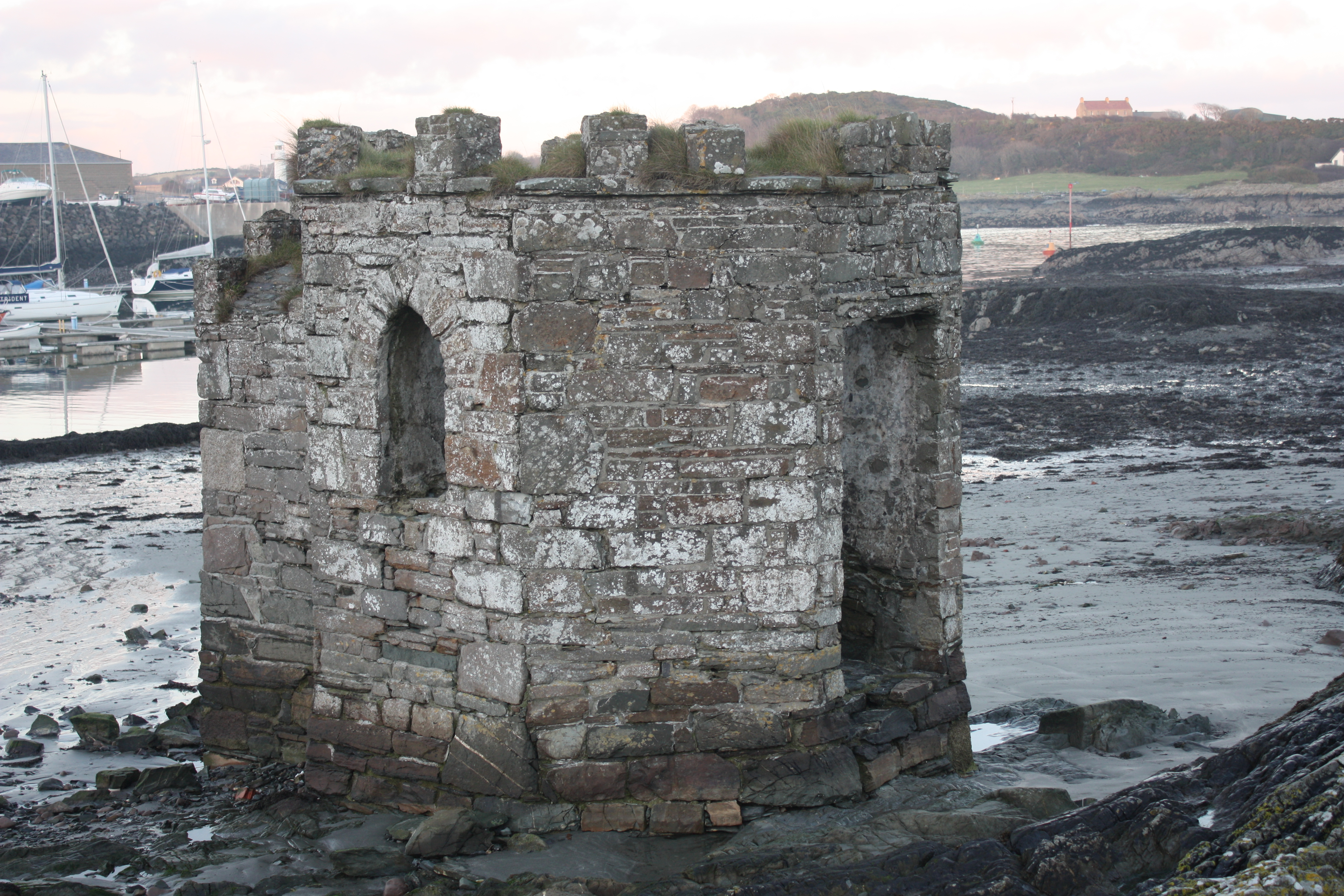
Bathing house

Ardglass (from Irish Ard Ghlais 'green height') is a coastal fishing village, townland (of 321 acres) and civil parish in County Down, Northern Ireland, in the historic barony of Lecale Lower. It is still a relatively important fishing harbour. It is situated on the B1 Ardglass to Downpatrick road, about 6 miles (9.7 kilometres) to the south east of Downpatrick, in the Lecale peninsula on the Irish Sea. It had a population of 1,761 in the 2021 census, and is located within the Newry, Mourne and Down area.

The village is a commuter centre for workers in Downpatrick and Belfast, a seaside resort and a local service centre providing housing and a variety of shops and services largely concentrated in Castle Place, Quay Street, Kildare Street and Bath Street. A Conservation area was designated in Ardglass in 1996, focused on its early 19th century street pattern. The village has eight archaeological sites within the area and another two nearby. There are a number of listed properties located on Castle Place, Kildare Street and The Crescent. St Nicholas's Church, King's Castle, Ardglass Castle, Isabella Tower, the disused railway station, the North Pier and the inner Dock are also listed.

== History ==
Ardglass grew from a place of little note in the 13th century to a modestly prosperous port in the 15th century. It was an important town and port in the Middle Ages, but no harbour works seem to have been constructed until after 1812. Then William Ogilvie, who had acquired the Ardglass estate, had a harbour built. Further extensions to the pier and a lighthouse were made, but on 27 November 1838 a great storm undermined the lighthouse which fell into the sea along with the end of the pier. The harbour master between 1845 and 1858 was Captain Bernard Hughes (1790–1866), M.N., who was also private secretary to the local squireen, Aubrey de Vere Beauclerk, (a grandson of William Ogilvie), and master of the Erasmus Smith school in Ardglass. When the S.S. Great Britain was run aground in Dundrum Bay in 1846 due to a navigational error, Hughes was involved in her salvage. This led him to champion Ardglass as a "Harbour of Refuge" for vessels off the northeast coast of Ireland in times of distress. He carried on a tireless campaign in the local press and with the Admiralty to achieve his goal, but was ultimately unsuccessful. He invented and patented the keystone method of constructing sea walls in 1849-51 which involved stones being set together without the use of mortar to allow them to expand when being pounded by wave action. Captain Bernard Hughes's sons included John Waring Maxwell Hughes (1816–1906), for whom see passim, and his grandsons; Commander William Thomas Hughes (1880–1978), staff captain of the RMS Mauretania, and Vice-Commodore Johnstone Hughes (1866–1931) of Messrs Elder Dempster, who was born in Ardglass. His great-grandsons included, Major General William Dillon Hughes, (1900–1998), head of the Royal Army Medical Corps, who was born in Ardglass, and Air Marshal Sir Andrew Mc Kee (1903–1985), former head of Transport Command.

Work on the pier was completed by 1885 and it remains in use to this day.

Ardglass contains more medieval tower houses than any other town in Ireland, a total of four, reflecting its importance as Ulster's busiest port in the 15th century. It also has probably the most extensive network of warehouses from the period surviving in Ireland. These were important in the substantial grain export trade of the fourteenth and fifteenth centuries. Fortifications survive in the town from the fifteenth century, including Jordan's Castle, the most imposing of a ring of towers built around the harbour to secure the then important Anglo-Norman trading port, King's Castle and Cowd Castle. A map of 1634 shows three buildings: Greate ward, Little ward and Ardglas, the latter referring to the 'green height' known as The Ward.

Nearby are the ruins of the 15th-century Ardtole Church. Francis Joseph Bigger, the Irish nationalist, and sometime Belfast solicitor, purchased Jordan's Castle at Ardglass in the 1890s. He restored the castle, naming it Castle Sean, a model of the Celtic Revival and made it a meeting place for its more prominent people, such as Alice Stopford Green, finally bequeathing it to the state.

=== Account of Ardglass in 1833 ===
The Dublin Penny Journal of 30 March 1833 describes Ardglass as follows:

Ardglass is picturesquely situated on the shore of a little harbour of the same name, in the Barony of Lecale, seven miles S.E. of Downpatrick; and though now a mean village, with very few inhabitants, ranked, anciently, as the principal town of trade, next to Carrickfergus, in the province of Ulster. Its harbour, however, which is iron-bound and full of rocks, is only fit for fishing vessels to enter; for which reason the out-trade was, for the most part, carried on in Killough harbour, from thence called by Speed, the haven of Ardglass. Its antiquity is very great, as a church was founded here by St. Patrick. It is said to have been a borough, though on its ruin the privilege of returning members to parliament went into disuse; in the reign of Henry the VI. it was a corporation, governed by a Portrieve.

— Dublin Penny Journal

== Economy ==
Ardglass has been a fishing port for more than two thousand years and developed as such due to its location on the east coast of Lecale and its sitting by a natural inlet. It has one of the few harbours which is accessible at all states of the tide and today has two fishing piers, the North Pier and South Pier, a number of fish processing factories and a marina. While the port is not as busy now as in its heyday, 150 years ago, up to £5 million passes through the fish trade here every year. The port specialises in herrings, prawns, and whitefish.

== Places of interest ==
- Ardglass Marina, sometimes also known as Phennick Cove, has a capacity for about 80 craft and a deep water basin open 24 hours daily all year. Strangford Lough lies six miles to the north.
- Ardglass Golf Club is the local course. The clubhouse was formerly known as Ardglass Castle and the building dates from the 15th century.
- Ardglass Bathing House is a hexagonal stone-cut structure built c.1830 by William Ogilvy.
- Jordan's Castle is a ruined 15th-century tower house and one of several in Ardglass. It is located between Kildare and Quay Streets.
- Isabella's Tower, a folly built on top of a hill by Aubrey de Vere Beauclerc in the 19th century as a gazebo for his invalid daughter.
- Ardtole Church is a 15th-century ruined church standing on a hilltop overlooking the Irish Sea and the Isle of Man, 0.75 miles (1.21 km) north-east of Ardglass.

== Transport ==
Ardglass railway station on the Belfast and County Down Railway, opened on 8 July 1892, but finally closed on 16 January 1950.

== Sport ==
Ardglass F.C. play association football in the Newcastle and District Amateur Football League.

Ardglass GAC play Division 4 Football in County Down and are 4 time JFC champions.

== Demography ==
=== 2001 Census ===
Ardglass is classified as a village. On Census day (29 April 2001) there were 1,668 people living in Ardglass. Of these:

- 27.3% were aged under 16 and 18.8% were aged 60 and over
- 48.1% of the population were male and 51.9% were female
- 87.9% were from a Catholic background and 10.2% were from a Protestant background
- 5.3% of people aged 16–74 were unemployed.

=== 2011 Census ===
On Census Day (27 March 2011) the usually resident population of Ardglass Settlement was 1,635 accounting for 0.09% of the NI total. In Ardglass Settlement, considering the resident population:

- 99.76% were from the white (including Irish Traveller) ethnic group
- 88.99% belong to or were brought up in the Catholic religion and 8.13% belong to or were brought up in a 'Protestant and Other Christian (including Christian related)' religion
- 23.18% indicated that they had a British national identity, 39.88% had an Irish national identity and 40.31% had a Northern Irish national identity
- 12.53% had some knowledge of Irish
- 2.78% had some knowledge of Ulster-Scots
- 1.27% did not have English as their first language

== Civil parish of Ardglass ==
The civil parish includes the village of Ardglass. The civil parish contains the townlands of Ardglass, Ardtole, Coney Island, Ringfad and Tullycarnan.

== Notable people ==
- Thomas Hunter, founder and president of Hunter College in New York City was born in Ardglass.
- Gerry Kelly, broadcaster and journalist, lives in Ardglass.

== See also ==
- List of towns and villages in Northern Ireland
- List of civil parishes of County Down
