= Ardtole Church =

Ruined church in County Down, Northern Ireland

Coordinates: 54°16′06″N 5°35′49″W

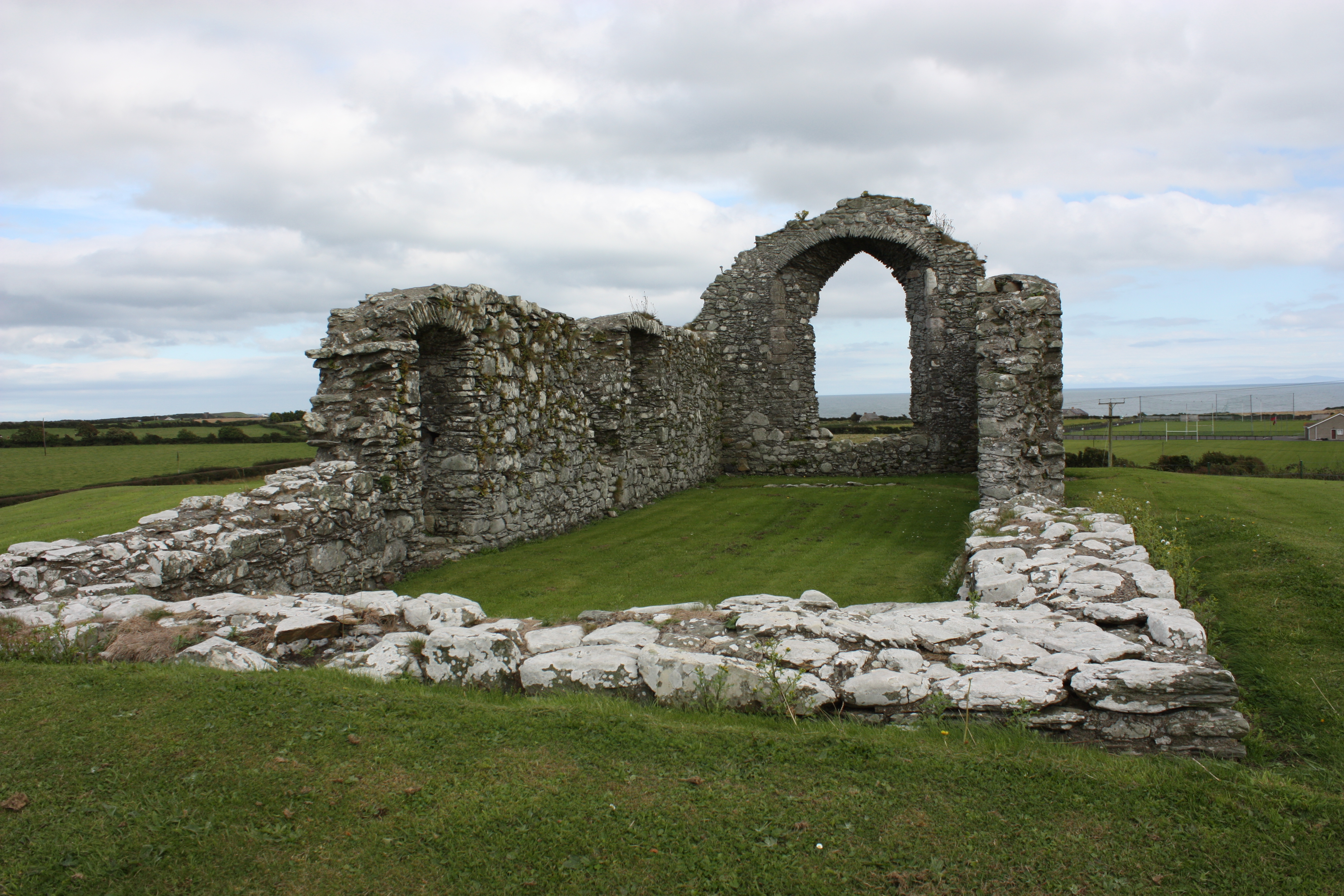
Ardtole Church, September 2010

Ardtole Church (Ulster Scots: Ardtole Kirk) is a 15th-century ruined church standing on a hilltop overlooking the Irish Sea and the Isle of Man, 0.75 miles (1.2 km) north-east of the town of Ardglass in County Down, Northern Ireland, at grid ref: J564382. It was formerly the parish church of Ardglass and is dedicated to St Nicholas, the patron saint of sailors.

== History ==
This location was probably a pre-Christian sacred site. The present ruins date to the 15th century, it has been in ruins since at least 1657 when it was described as "only old walls". The church and graveyard are set in a very prominent position at the North end of a ridge. The graveyard is a substantial earthwork, now rectangular in plan, 52m E-W x 42m N-S. The East gable of the church stands to the original height, while the West gable is reduced to foundations. A cross slab of Early Christian type from the site is now built into the gable of the porch of the Catholic church in Chapeltown nearby

The site also contains a stone-built souterrain.
