= Ballyhornan =

Village in County Down, Northern Ireland

Coordinates: 54.3°N 5.55°W

Ballyhornan: Irish: Baile an Eoirna
- Location within County Down
- Population: 455 (2021 census)
- District: Newry, Mourne and Down
- County: County Down
- Country: Northern Ireland
- Sovereign state: United Kingdom
- Post town: DOWNPATRICK
- Postcode district: BT30
- Dialling code: 028
- UK Parliament: South Down
- NI Assembly: South Down

Ballyhornan (from Irish Baile an Eoirna meaning 'the town land of the barley') is a small village and townland in eastern County Down, Northern Ireland. It is located along the Irish Sea coast, less than 10 miles from Downpatrick. The village had a population of 455 at the 2021 census. It lies near the site of the former RAF Bishopscourt installation, which closed in 1990, and much of the housing outside the boundaries of the traditional settlement (such as Killard Square) was used by RAF airmen.

The core of the village is located at the extreme northern end of the Ardglass ward.

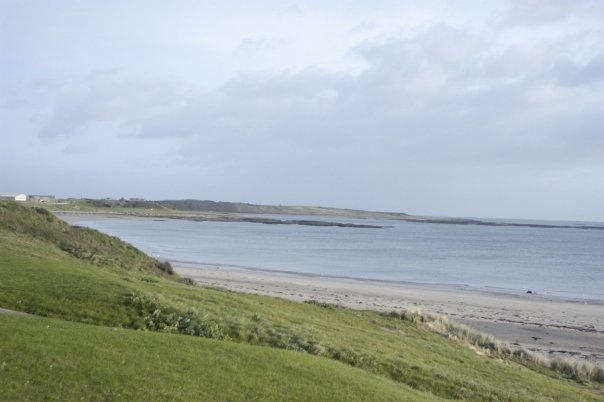
View along the coast from the beach at Ballyhornan.

Ballyhornan was founded in 1636, and a popular explanation of its name in Irish is Baile Uí Chornáin — Ó Cornáin's townland. More recent research contends that the origin is Baile Torannan, or Toranan's town, referring to a sixth-century saint whose feast day is celebrated 12 August.

After the closure of Bishopscourt, much of the housing was turned over to civilians, who bought a large portion of land whole. This, however, has led to problems of road maintenance, street lighting and other issues.

The village currently experiences subpar sewer capacity, and residents continue to petition Northern Ireland politicians for funding for a new sewer system.

Debate has taken place in the Northern Ireland Assembly about finding solutions to the situation in Ballyhornan; some politicians object to spending public funds in upgrading infrastructure because the roadways and sewage systems are privately owned, and they fear a knock-on effect would cause many private developments to seek similar relief.

In the past, the village was considered a "deprived" area. Changes have happened in the community in recent years, such as the opening of the Ballyhornan Family Centre and projects the center undertakes. Development is ongoing, and Down District Council has approved plans for a petrol station and garage in the village.

== Local landmarks ==
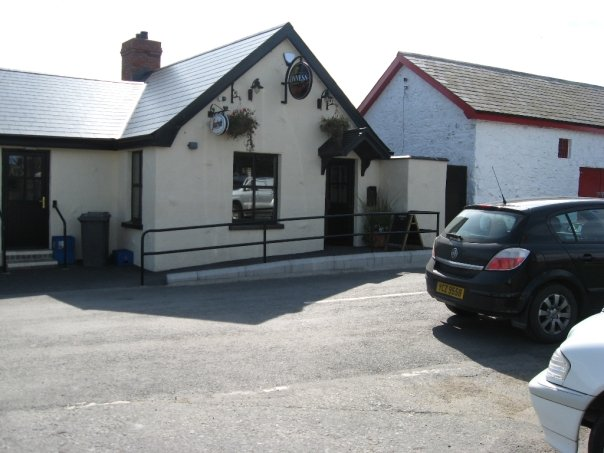
Cable Bar, Ballyhornan Road.

Ballyhornan is home to Cable Bar, which underwent a facelift is 2009. The local landmark takes its name from the undersea telecom cable that runs from the Cable House in Ballyhornan across to the Isle of Man. Cable Bar is a friendly and relaxing pub that has served the local community and visitors for many years and continues to do so.

Ballyhornan also is home to the Mustard Seed House, a non-denominational, spiritual retreat home located not far from the beach.

Next to the helicopter pad for the former Bishopscourt air base is the Ballyhornan Community Centre.

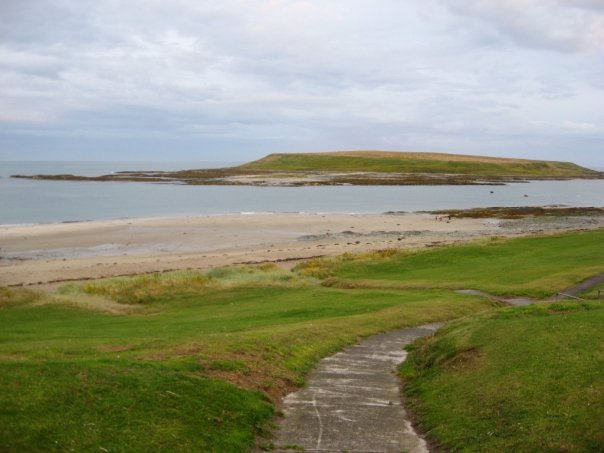
Guns Island viewed from Ballyhornan beach

== Guns Island ==
Located 200 yards from the shore of the Ballyhornan beach is Guns Island. It is a known fishing spot.

== Killard Nature Reserve ==
About one mile north of the village along the Killard Road is the Killard Nature Reserve, run by Northern Ireland Environment Agency. Recorded history of the site dates back to 1403, and it has seen a number of uses—from hurling pitch to remote RAF radar station. Unique flowers, birds and critters can be found in the nature reserve. Bird-watching is one of the main reasons people visit the site.

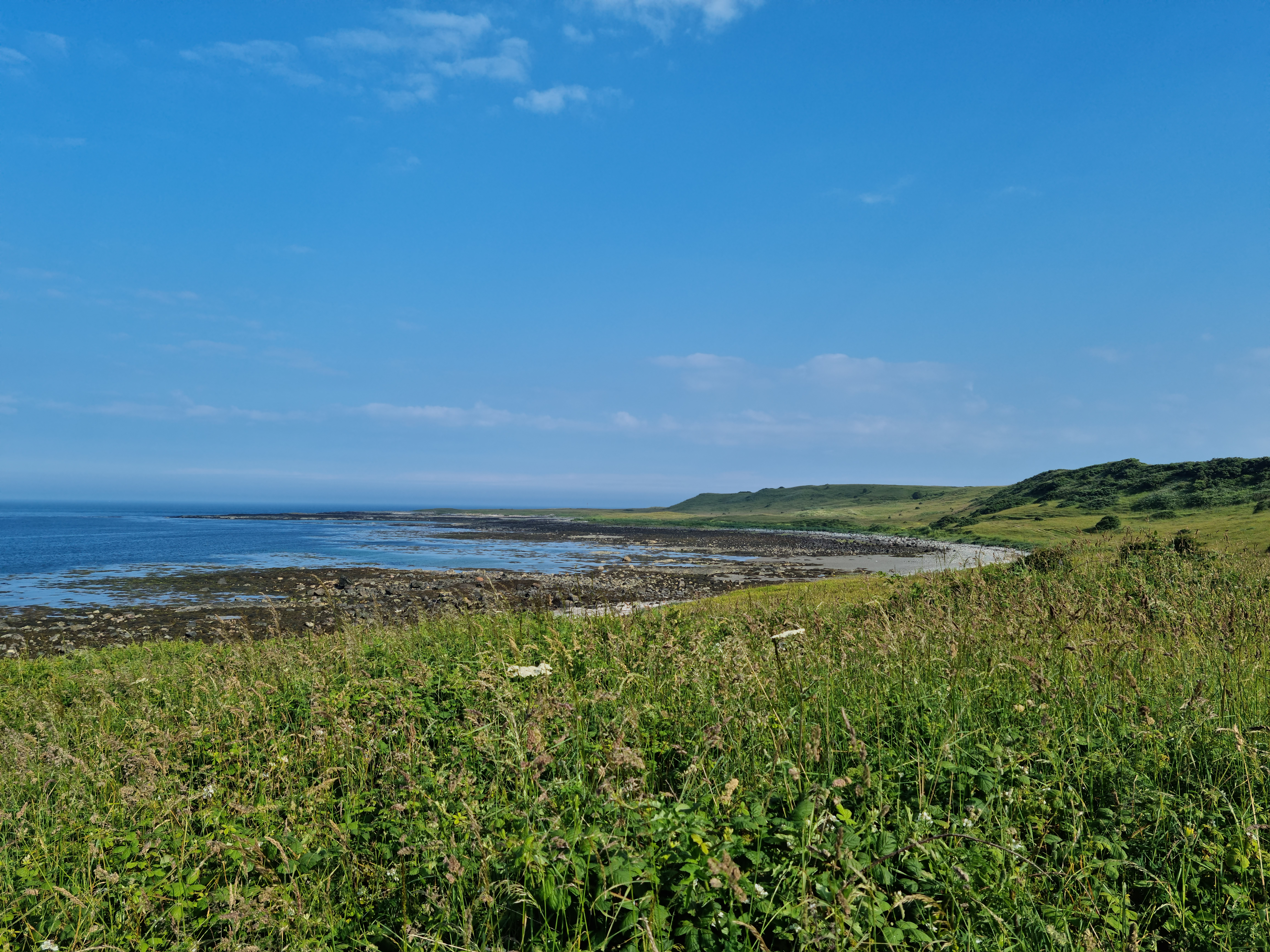
The beach and point situated at the end of Killard Nature Reserve

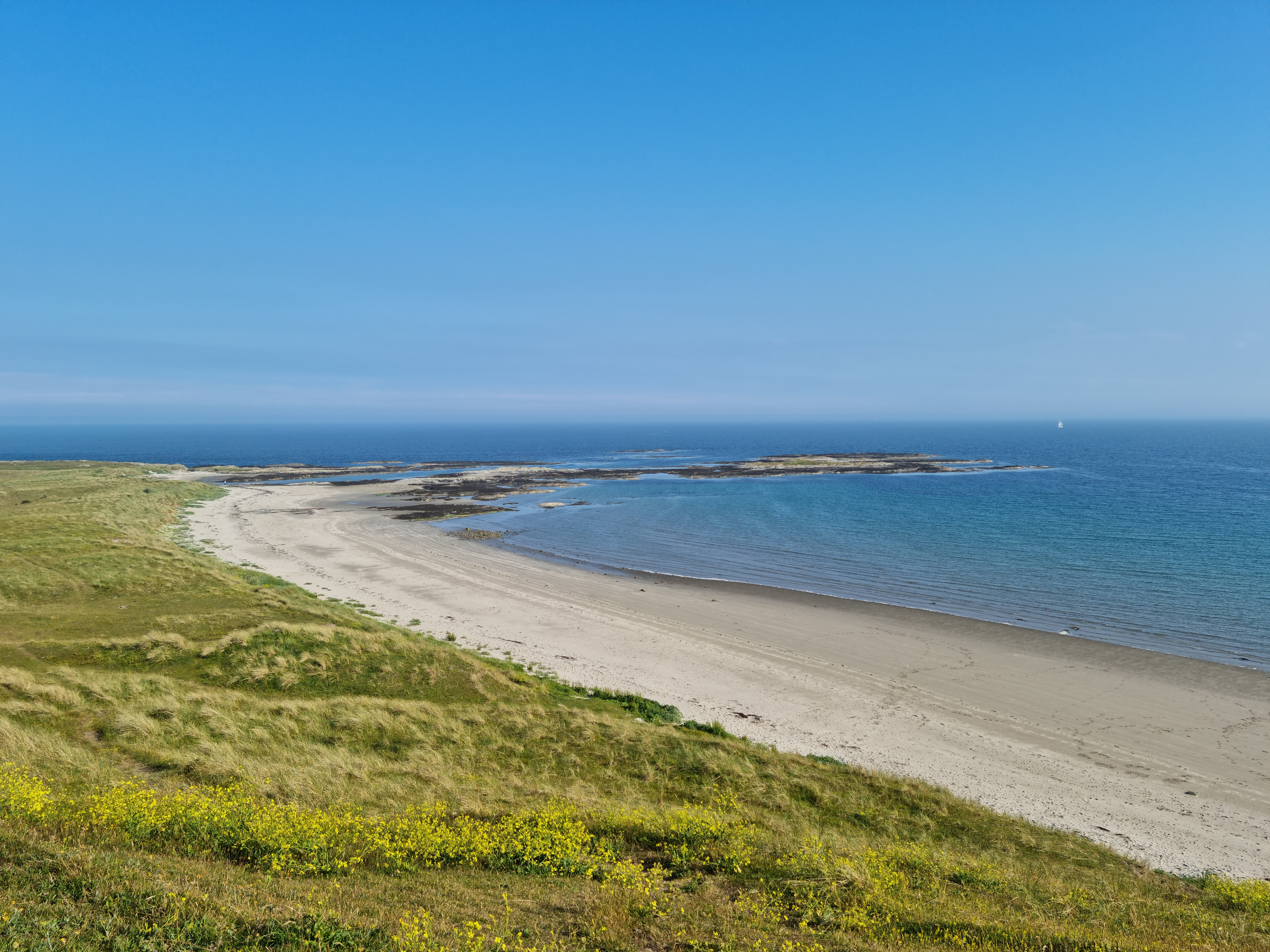
The beach with Killard Nature reserve on the left side of the photo.

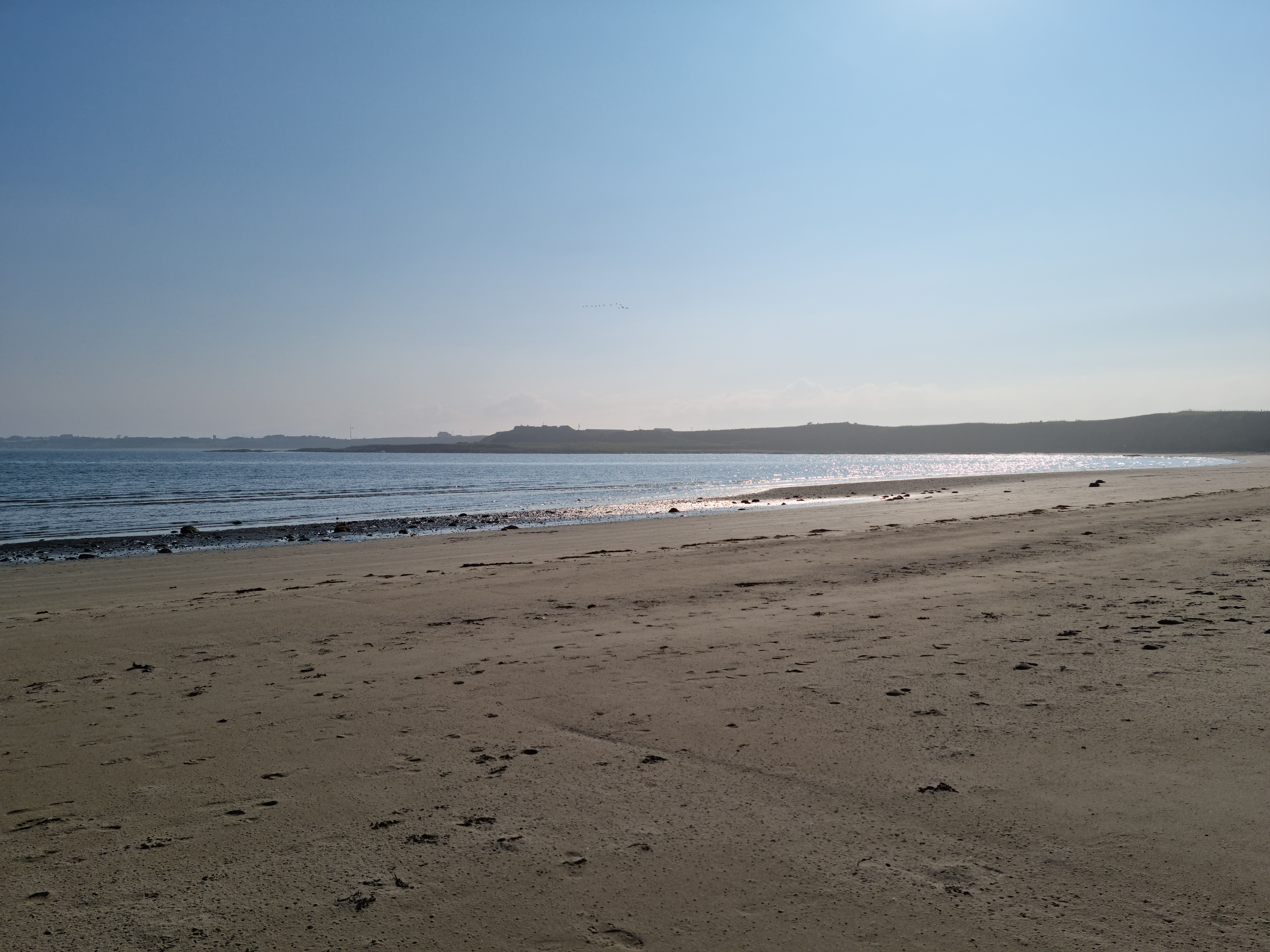
The beach with Ballyhornan in the background

The effects of the Ice Age also can be seen in the shape of the rocks at Killard Point.

== Transport ==
Ballyhornan is reachable by multiple trips daily on Ulsterbus to Downpatrick, with connecting services from the Downpatrick bus compound to Belfast and other towns in County Down. Cable Bar serves as the terminus for the Ballyhornan bus routes.
