= Lecale Lower =

Lecale Lower Leath Cathail Íochtarachl(Irish)
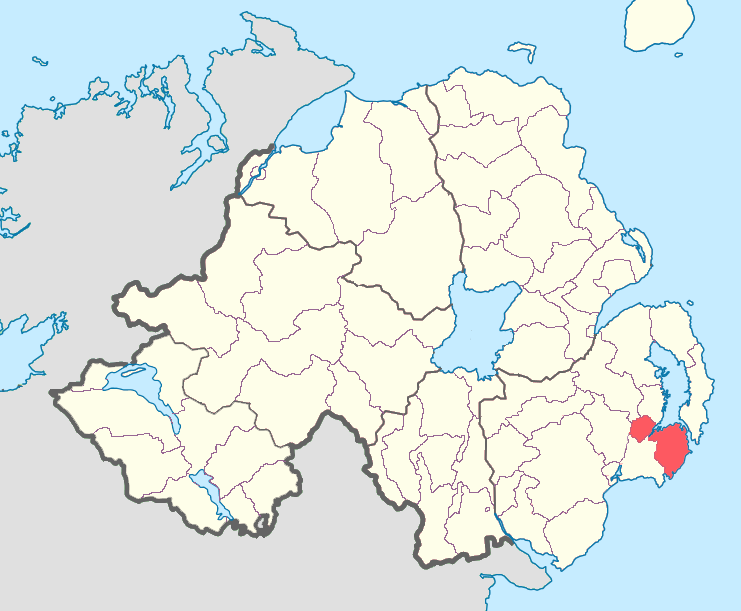
- Location of Lecale Lower, County Down, Northern Ireland.
- Sovereign state: United Kingdom
- Country: Northern Ireland
- County: Down

Lecale Lower (named after the former barony of Lecale) is a barony in County Down, Northern Ireland. It lies to the east of the county with Strangford Lough to its north and the Irish Sea to its right. It is bordered by five other baronies: Lecale Upper to the south; Ards Upper to the north-east just across the mouth of Strangford Lough; Dufferin to the north; Castlereagh Upper to the north-west; and Kinelarty to the west.

In medieval times the Ó Coltair (Coulter) sept is noted in the Lecale Lower area, of which the townland of Ballyculter gets its name.

The barony of Lecale Lower was created in 1851 when the barony of Lecale was split into two, the other part being Lecale Upper.

== List of settlements ==
Below is a list of the villages and population centres in Lecale Lower:

=== Villages ===
- Ardglass
- Strangford

=== Hamlets ===
- Annacloy
- Ballyhornan
- Coney Island
- Saul

== List of civil parishes ==
Below is a list of civil parishes in Lecale Lower:

- Ardglass
- Ballee (also partly in barony of Lecale Upper (one townland))
- Ballyculter
- Dunsfort
- Inch
- Kilclief (also partly in barony of Lecale Upper)
- Rathmullan (one townland, rest in barony of Lecale Upper)
- Saul
