= Tievenadarragh =

Coordinates: 54.3452°N 5.8458°W

Tievenadarragh: Irish: Taobh na Darach
- Townland
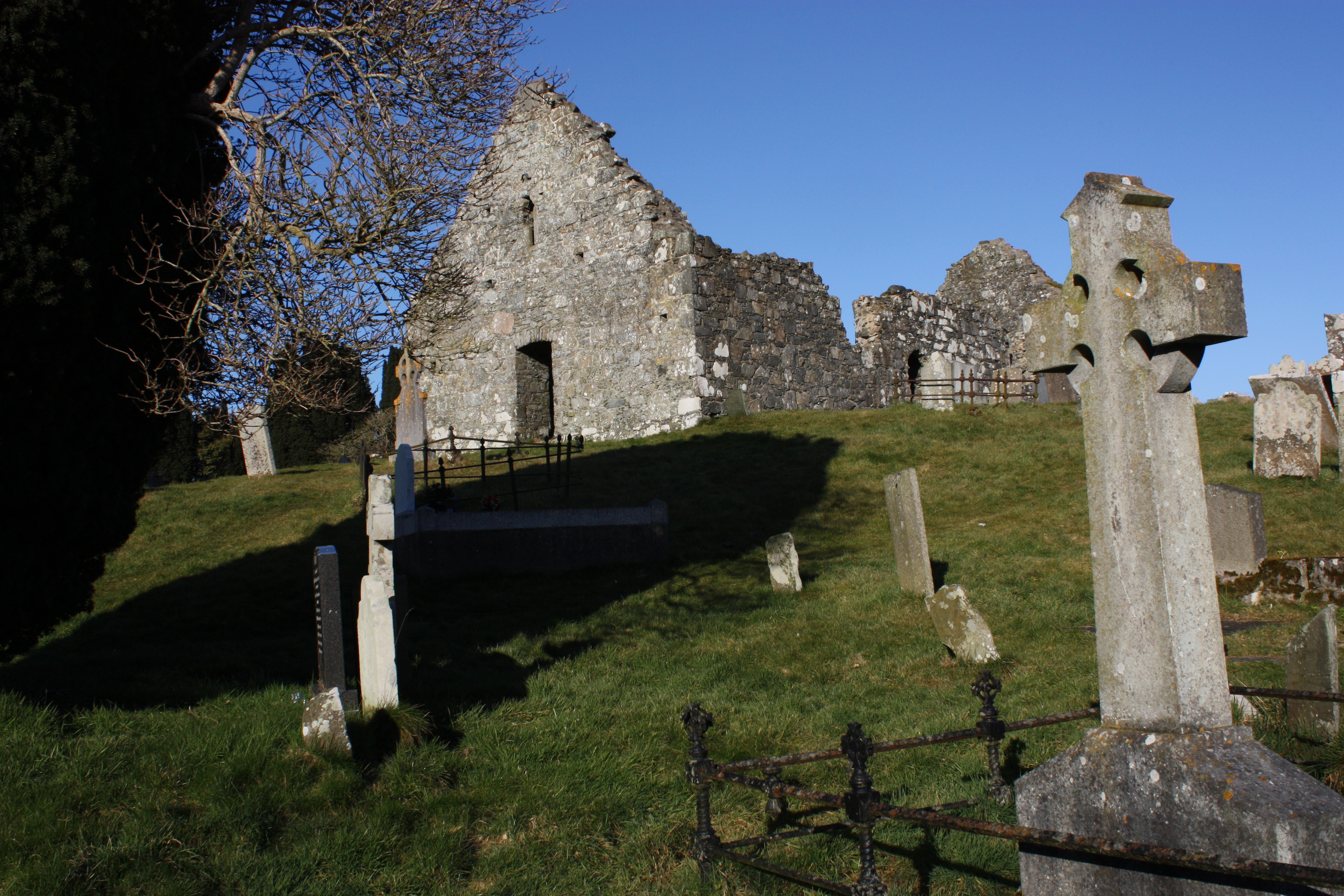
- Loughinisland churches in 2010

- Location within County Down
- OS grid reference: J430450
  - Belfast: 21 mi (34 km) NW
  - Dublin: 80 mi (130 km) SSW
- Civil parish: Loughinisland
- District: Newry, Mourne and Down
- County: County Down
- Country: Northern Ireland
- Sovereign state: United Kingdom
- Post town: DOWNPATRICK
- Postcode district: BT30
- Dialling code: 028
- UK Parliament: South Down
- NI Assembly: South Down

Tievenadarragh (from Irish Taobh na Darach, meaning 'hillside of the oak tree') is a townland of area 1,269 acres (514 ha) in County Down, Northern Ireland. It is situated in the civil parish of Loughinisland and the historic barony of Kinelarty.

== Places of interest ==
The Loughinisland Churches are located in Tievenadarragh. They consist of the remains of three ruined churches from the 13th to the 17th centuries and a graveyard. Located on an island in Loughinisland Lake, they are accessible by a causeway. The churches have been designated state-care historic monuments at grid ref: J4234 4537.

== Archaeology ==
=== Mass rock ===
A mass rock is recorded on the eastern side of Bishop's Mountain. Historical accounts describe the site as a prominent mass rock constructed on the face of a quarry, featuring an imported flat stone incised with a cross used as an altar table, with additional crosses carved into the surrounding rock. The field below is traditionally known as the "altar field." The site is marked on the second edition (1860) and subsequent Ordnance Survey six-inch maps. Despite its documented location, the stone could not be located during a site visit in 1992, and the parish priest residing nearby was also unable to identify it. The area is associated with Bishop Dr. McCartan (1760–1778) and Dominican friar Fr. Murtough Burns, who officiated locally and died in 1757.

=== Tievenadarragh Cashel ===
The remains of a cashel are located on the southern slope of Bishop's Mountain in County Down, approximately 200 metres south of the summit, which is marked by an Ordnance Survey triangulation pillar at 427 feet above sea level. The site lies at an elevation of approximately 400 feet and is recorded under grid reference J408463. The cashel consists of a circular enclosure approximately 33 metres in diameter, defined by a collapsed drystone wall up to 0.75 metres in height and around 4 metres in width. The wall is largely continuous, with a gap on the southern side measuring approximately 6 metres, interpreted as an entrance. The interior is uneven, with scattered stones and natural rock outcrops. The site is overgrown with whin, which impedes access.

=== Tievenadarragh Rath ===
The Rath is a small circular enclosure located approximately 400 metres north of Loughinisland situated on the crest of a moderately high ridge, offering views to the west where a taller ridge is visible. The site lies within pasture fields bounded by drystone walls and hedged with quickthorn and whin scrub. It is recorded under grid reference J427461. The enclosure measures approximately 23 metres from north to south and 24.3 metres from east to west. The interior is slightly dish-shaped with a low, circular rise at the centre. The internal bank is largely intact around the perimeter, with an interior height of 1.25 metres, an exterior height of 1.75 metres, and a width of 5 metres. Stone revetment is present on the outer face of the bank on the western side. There is a 4-metre-wide entrance on the southern side, which may be of modern origin, and a narrow footpath entrance created by livestock on the northern side. Visual evidence of a ditch survives along the south-eastern perimeter, measuring approximately 2.5 metres in width, 1.75 metres below the top of the bank, and 0.5 metres below the surrounding field level.

== Gallery ==
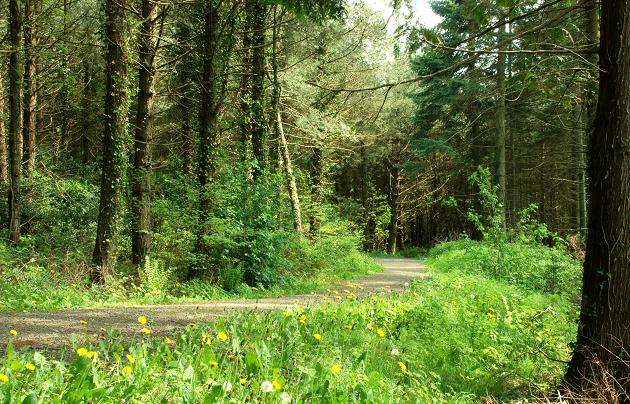
Tievenadarragh Wood

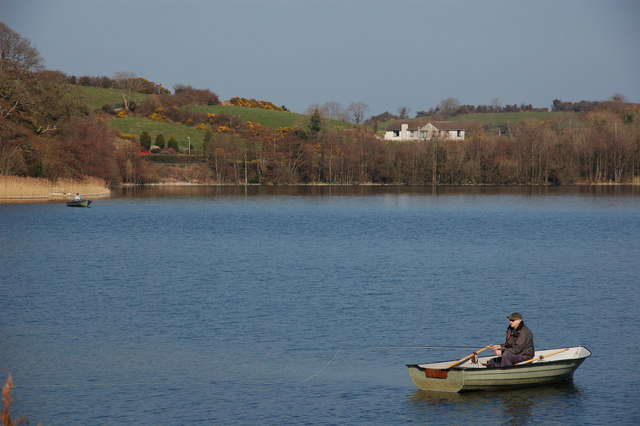
a view of Loughinisland Lake in Tievenadarragh

== Geography ==
Townlands that border Tievenadarragh include:

- Annadorn to the east
- Castlenavan to the south
- Drumaness to the west
- Drumgooland to the east
- Magheralone to the north
- Seavaghan to the east

== See also ==
- List of townlands in County Down
