= Loughinisland =

Coordinates: 54°20′17″N 5°49′23″W

Loughinisland: Irish: Loch an Oileáin; Scots: Lochinislann
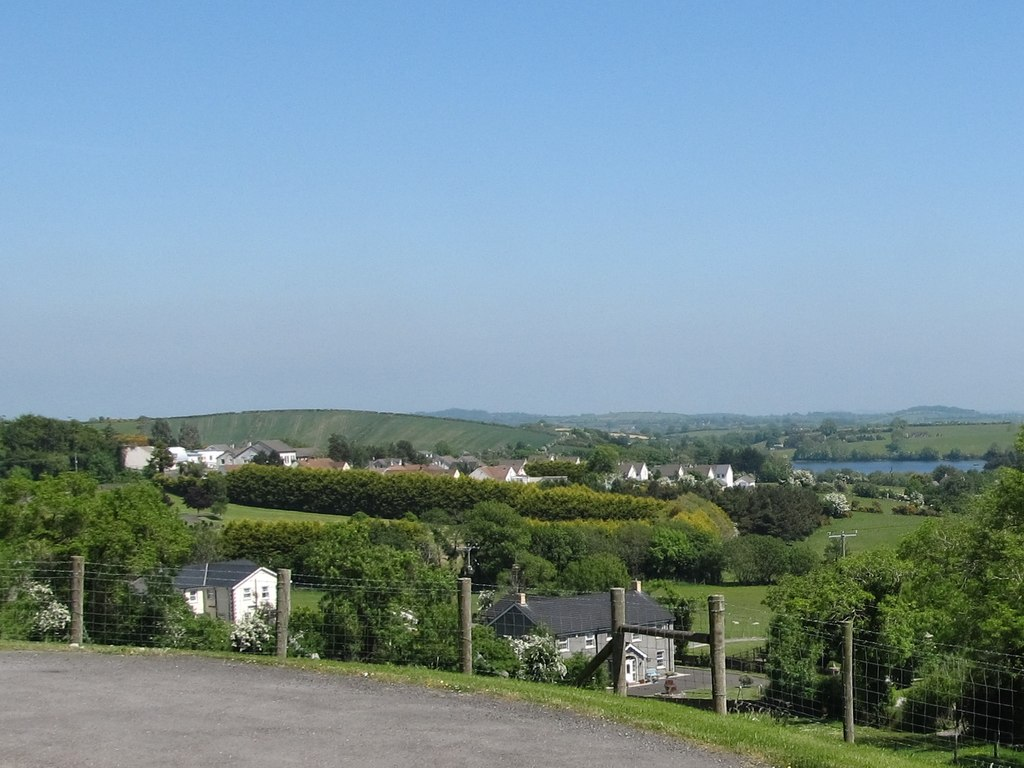
- The village of Loughinisland from the Loughinisland Road

- Location within County Down
- District: Newry, Mourne and Down
- County: County Down
- Country: Northern Ireland
- Sovereign state: United Kingdom
- Post town: DOWNPATRICK
- Postcode district: BT30
- Dialling code: 028
- UK Parliament: South Down
- NI Assembly: South Down

Loughinisland (/ˌlɒxɪnˈaɪlənd/ LOKH-in-EYE-lənd, from Irish Loch an Oileáin 'lake of the island') is a small village and civil parish in County Down, Northern Ireland. It is between Downpatrick and Ballynahinch, about 21 miles (34 kilometres) south of Belfast.

== History ==
The village of Loughinisland grew up in the townland of Tievenadarragh, beside a lake which has a small island on it. This island was the headquarters of the McCartan clan who were powerful from 11th century to 16th century, ruling over the surrounding territory of Kinelarty.

The village is known for its three churches that were built on this island between the 13th and 17th centuries. Ruins of the churches and a cemetery can still be seen.

In addition to its parish churches, in 1836 it was recorded that there was a school in Loughinisland. Again, today, the village is home to a primary school and a Catholic church, both named 'St Macartan's'.

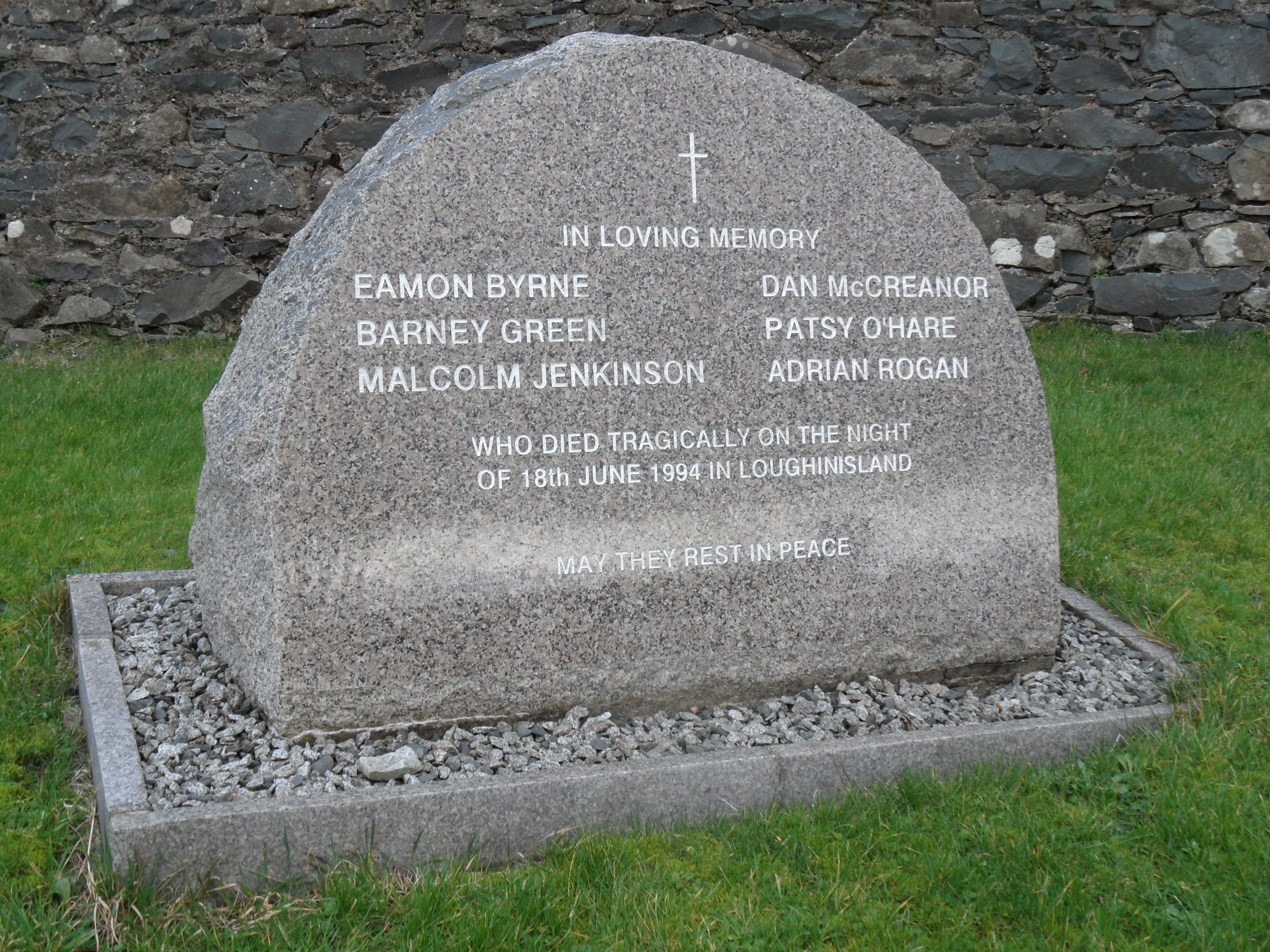
1994 memorial to villagers, in St McCartan's churchyard, Loughinisland, County Down

Loughinisland was relatively untouched by the Troubles. However, on 18 June 1994, it was the scene of the Loughinisland massacre, when two members of the Ulster Volunteer Force (UVF), a loyalist paramilitary group, attacked O'Toole's Pub with assault rifles, killing six Catholic civilians and wounding five. That evening, about 24 people had gathered in the pub to watch the television broadcast of the Ireland football team playing in the 1994 FIFA World Cup.

As the BBC reported on the 18th anniversary in their 2012 article Players wear black armbands in memory of Loughinisland tragedy: 'The FAI said it was "particularly poignant" because the shootings [in 1994] happened while the victims were watching Ireland vs Italy during World Cup USA.'

== Places of interest ==
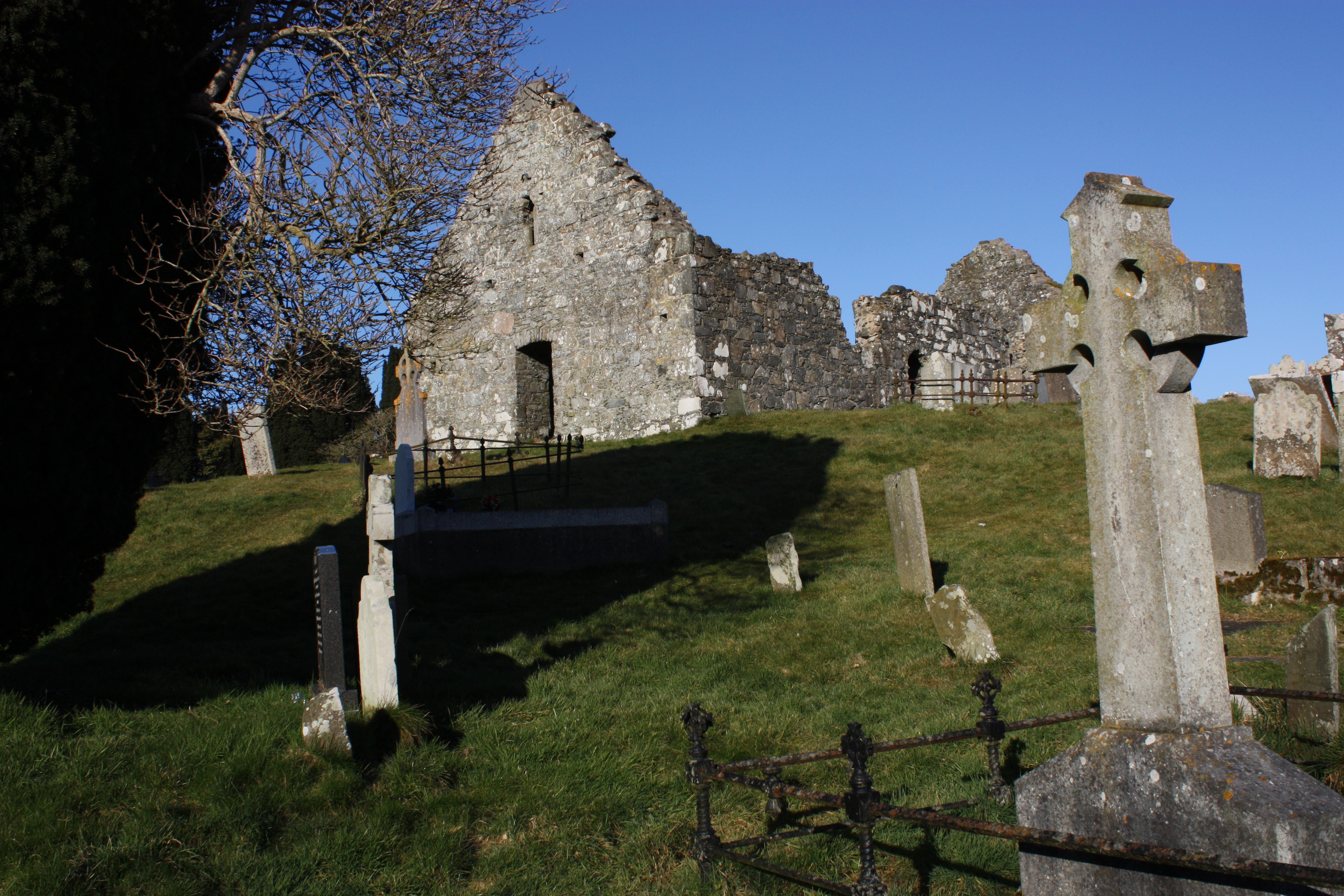
Three ruined ancient churches on the island in the lake

Loughinisland Churches are a group of three ancient ruined churches in a cemetery on the island in Loughinisland Lake, reached by a causeway.

The earliest recorded reference is to a parish church on the site in 1306. The Middle Church is the oldest, probably from the 13th century. The large North Church was built in the 15th century, probably to replace the Middle Church, and continued in use until 1720. The smallest is the South (MacCartan's) Church, the elaborately carved west door of which has the date 1636 and initials PMC for Phelim MacCartan.

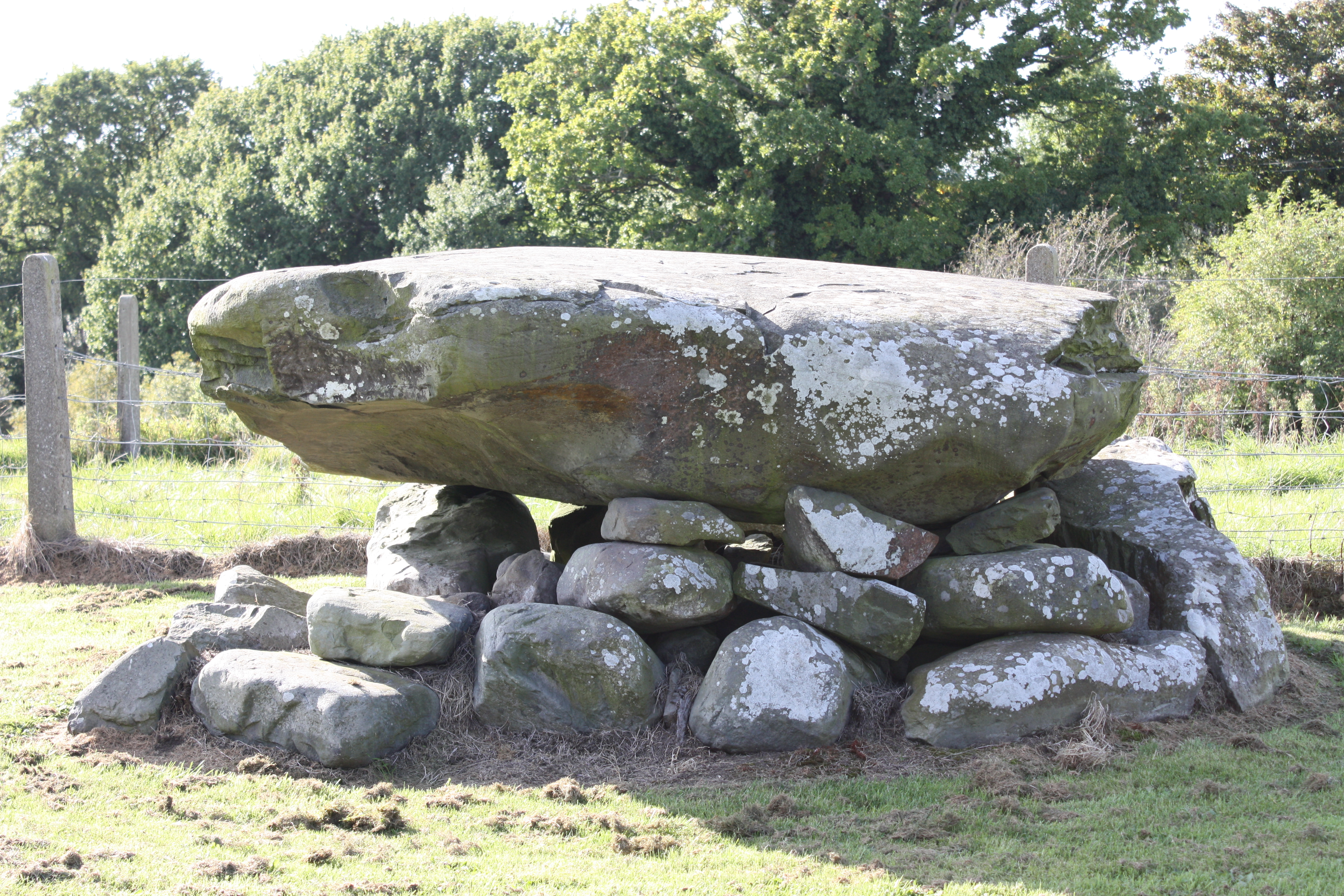
The Annadorn Dolmen

The ancient monument of Annadorn Dolmen is on the north east shore of Loughinisland Lake, within sight of the Churches. The dolmen, some 3,500 years old, consists of a slightly displaced capstone covering a rectangular chamber of which three side stones survive. It is thought that it may be the remains of a passage tomb.

It was upon the capstone of this monument that Thomas Russell, one of the co-founders of the Society of United Irishmen, stood to urge the people of Loughinisland to join the unsuccessful Emmett Rising of 1803. However whilst hiding in Dublin he was arrested. He was sent to Downpatrick Gaol where he was executed by hanging and was then beheaded, on 21 October 1803. He was 35 years of age.

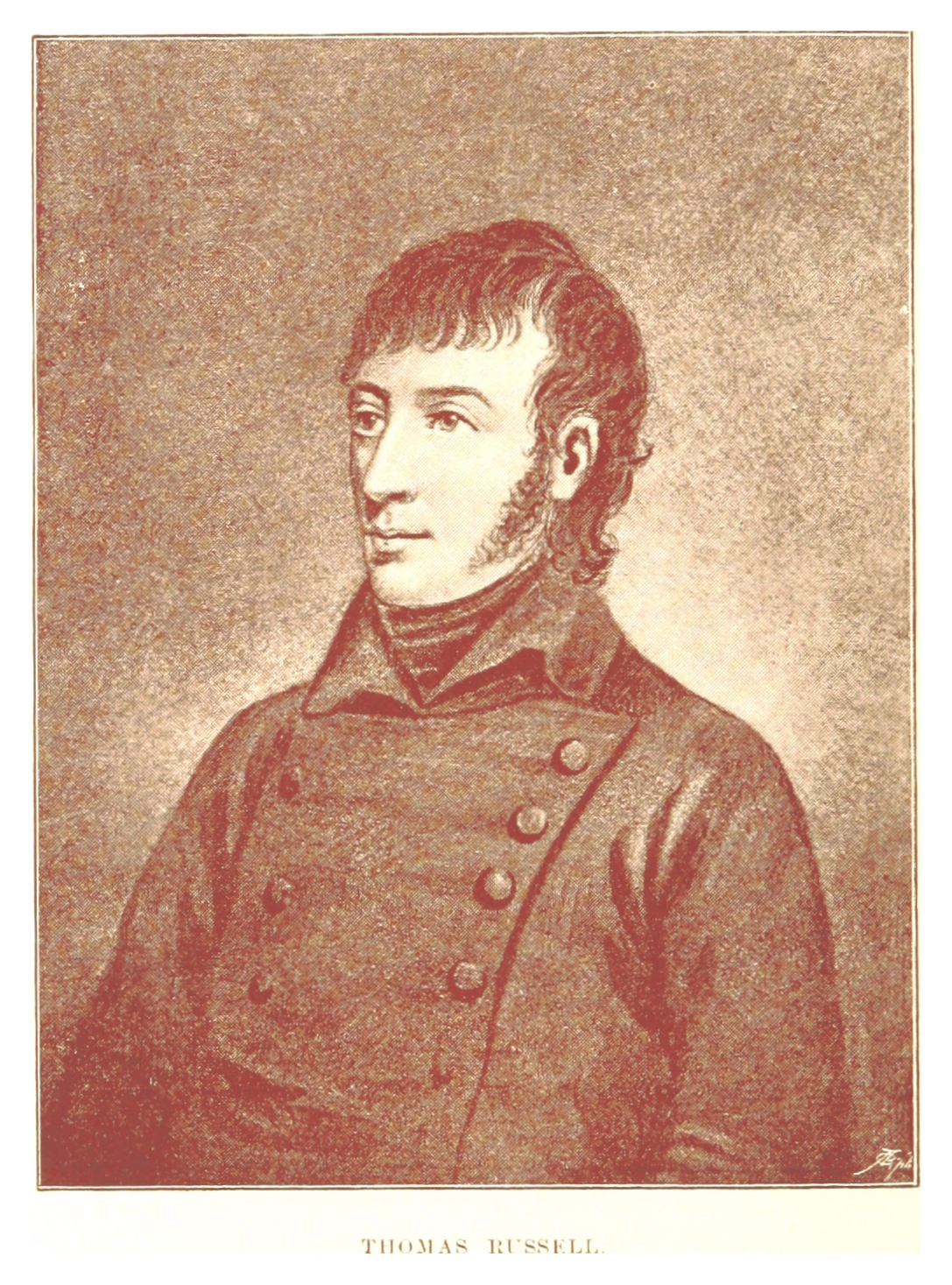
Thomas Russell, by RR Madden (1888)

== People ==
- Edward Gribben, a World War I flying ace credited with five aerial victories, was born in Loughinisland.
- Emma Rogan, a Sinn Féin member of the Northern Ireland Assembly from 2017 to 2022, is from Loughinisland

== Sport ==
Loughinisland Gaelic football club has won the Down Senior Football Championship on two occasions; 1975 and 1989. The club has also won a Down Intermediate Football Championship and Ulster Intermediate Club Football Championship in 2015. Players from the club have won Senior All Ireland Gaelic Football Championships with Down in 1960, 1991 & 1994.

== Civil parish of Loughinisland ==
The civil parish is in the historic barony of Kinelarty and contains the following villages:

- Loughinisland
- Clough
- Seaforde

=== Townlands ===
The civil parish contains the following townlands:

- Annadorn
- Ardilea
- Ardtanagh
- Castlenavan
- Claragh
- Clough
- Creeghduff
- Cumran
- Drumanaghan (also known as Drumulcaw)
- Drumanakelly
- Drumcaw
- Drumgooland
- Drumaroad
- Drumulcaw (also known as Drumanaghan)
- Dunnanew
- Dunturk
- Farranfad
- Knocksticken
- Naghan
- Scrib
- Seaforde Demesne
- Seavaghan
- Tannaghmore
- Tievenadarragh
