= McCartan =

McCartan Mac Artáin
- vert a lion a ramp. or, on a chief ar. a crescent betw. two dexter hands couped at the wrist gu.
- Parent house: Ulaid (Dál nAraidi)
- Country: Kingdom of Ulster
- Founder: Artan macCruinneith (d. 1004)
- Current head: Dominick Macartan (died 1772)
- Titles: Lord of Kinelarty
- Cadet branches: Guinness (possibly)

McCartan is an Irish surname. It is the Anglicized form of Mac Artáin, denoting the son of Artán (diminutive of the personal name Art, an old Irish word for "bear"). They were the Lords of Kinelarty, a barony in the County Down which derives its name from Cenel Faghartaigh (the race/clan of Faghartagh).

The McCartans belonged to the Uí Echach Cobo—of whom Magennis was the chief family—of the Dál nAraidi, who in turn came from the Cruthin tribe who were the first Celts to arrive in Ireland from about 800 to 500 BC. French President Charles de Gaulle is descended from the clan through his great-grandmother Angélique Marie McCartan.

Up until the 1600s, the McCartans were in control of much of mid-Down. The McCartan strongholds included Drumaroad, the adjoining townlands Loughinisland, Drumnaquoile, Magheratimpany, Ardilea, and the neighbouring town of Ballynahinch. The clan were chieftains of the territories of Kinelarty and Dufferin.

== Kinelarty and the McCartan Chieftaincy ==
In prehistoric times territorial boundaries were clearly defined by using dolmens, ritual sites and standing stones as markers. Such monuments can be found today at Slidderyford (Dundrum), Legananny (Slieve Croob), Annadorn (Loughinisland), Kilygoney (Ballynahinch) and Magheraknock (Ballynahinch).

On modern maps this area is an outline of the present barony of Kinelarty, with Loughinisland as a central hub. Interesting place names that are presently to be found in the Loughinisland area are such as:

- Rosconnor (woods at Connor’s point)
- Rademon (rath of Deman)
- Castlenavan (Eamhain’s Cashel)
- Tareesh (the King’s house)
- Kilmoremorean (Morean's big church)
- Cahirvor (the big seat)

These and further evidence in ancient manuscripts, provide confirmation of an ancient Kingship and Noble standing. At the Battle of Fontenoy in 1745 many McCartans fought on the French side against English regiments commanded by the landlords of their patrimony in County Down.

== Modern successes ==
Dr Patrick McCartan was the Dáil envoy to Washington in 1920 and in later years became a presidential candidate. In recent years more McCartan members have also held seats in Dail Eireann and in the European Parliament.

Edward McCartan, an American sculptor, is notable for his many works, including his reworking masterpiece of the Goddess Diana.

As a family bursting with football endeavors, albeit predominantly within the Gaelic adaptation of the sport, Seamus Vincent McCartan is the clan's single professional player, currently at club level for Bradford City. His international career has spanned U17, U19 and U21 levels. He made his highly anticipated International First Team debut in 2017.

Ryan McCartan, portraying the character Digbert "Diggie" Smalls on Disney's Liv and Maddie, has risen to success, showcasing the musical and theatrical talents of the clan.

== Links to the Guinness family ==
Trinity College Dublin tested the Y chromosome of a male member of the Guinness Brewery family, revealing that the claim that brewery founder Arthur Guinness was a descendant of the Magennis chieftains (of Iveagh in County Down) was incorrect, but rather that the family sprang from the McCartan clan.

== People ==
- Mac Cairthinn of Clogher (died 506), Irish Christian convert of St Patrick
- Daniel McCartan, Gaelic footballer, brother of James McCartan Jnr
- Edward McCartan (1879–1947), American sculptor
- Jack McCartan (born 1935), American hockey goaltender
- James McCartan Jnr, Gaelic footballer (1990–2000) and manager
- James McCartan Snr, Gaelic footballer (1950s-1960s) and manager (1980s), father of the above
- Michael McCartan (1851–1902), Irish nationalist politician, MP for South Down 1886–1902
- Pat McCartan (born 1953), Irish judge and former politician
- Patrick McCartan (1878–1963), Irish republican and politician
- Ryan McCartan (born 1993), American actor, singer and songwriter
- Sam McCartan, Gaelic footballer for Westmeath
- Shay McCartan (born 1994), Northern Irish footballer

== See also ==
- Irish clans
- Arthur Guinness, confirmed to have McCartan origins
- Guinness family
- Earl of Iveagh
- Lords of Kinelarty
