= Ardilea =

Townland in Northern Ireland

Coordinates: 54°16′57″N 5°49′40″W

Ardilea: Irish: Ard an Lao
- Location within County Down
- County: County Down
- Country: Northern Ireland
- Sovereign state: United Kingdom
- Postcode district: BT
- Dialling code: 028

Ardilea (from Irish Ard an Lao 'height of the calf') is a rural townland in County Down, Northern Ireland. It has an area of approximately 299 acres (1.2 km^{2}). It is situated in the civil parish of Loughinisland and the historic barony of Kinelarty, located 1.7 miles north of Dundrum. It lies within the Newry, Mourne and Down local government district.

== See also ==
- List of townlands in County Down
