= Annadorn Dolmen =

Dolmen in Northern Ireland

Coordinates: 54°20′31.75″N 5°48′12.52″W

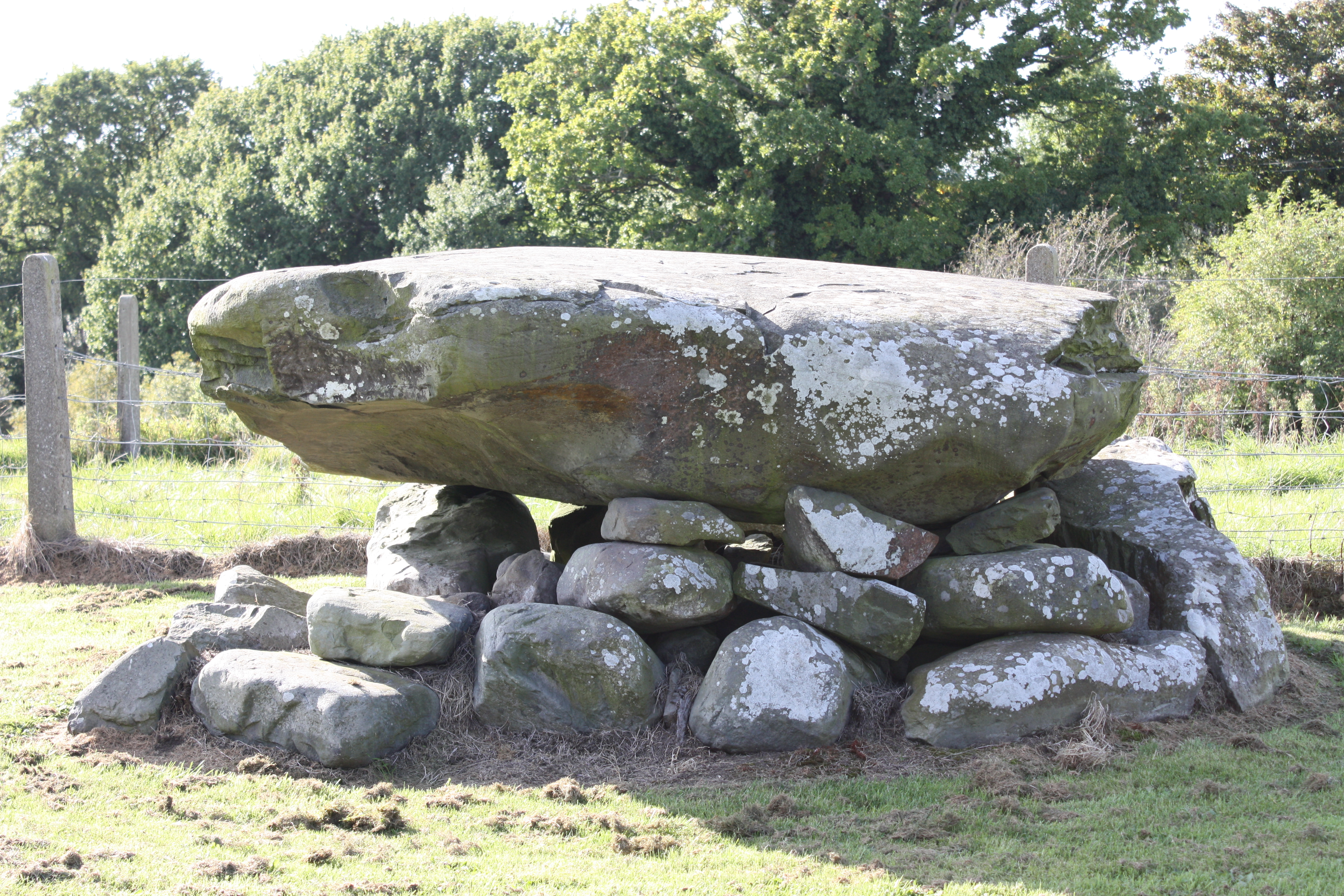
Annadorn Dolmen, October 2009

Annadorn Dolmen is a dolmen sited at the Buck's Head near Loughinisland, in the townland of Annadorn. Nearby you can find the old Annadorn school and post office in County Down, Northern Ireland. It is on the north-east shore of Loughinisland Lake, on a hillock overlooking Loughinisland Churches, a group of three ruined churches. The site is a State Care Historic Monument at grid ref: J4289 4591. Co-ordinates: Latitude: 54° 20' 29.97" N Longitude: 5° 48' 8.72" W

== Features ==
The dolmen has a large, low, slightly displaced capstone about 65 cm thick covering a rectangular chamber and supported by three stones about 60 cm high. An account of 1802 suggests that it was formerly set beneath a large rectangular cairn 60 ft in diameter and approached by a lintelled passage, so it could be the remains of a passage grave. The 1802 account also says the chamber under the capstone contained ashes and a number of bones.

== History ==
In the 18th century, Thomas Russell, co-founder and leader of the United Irishmen, used this stone as a platform for his gatherings in Loughinisland.

== Gallery ==
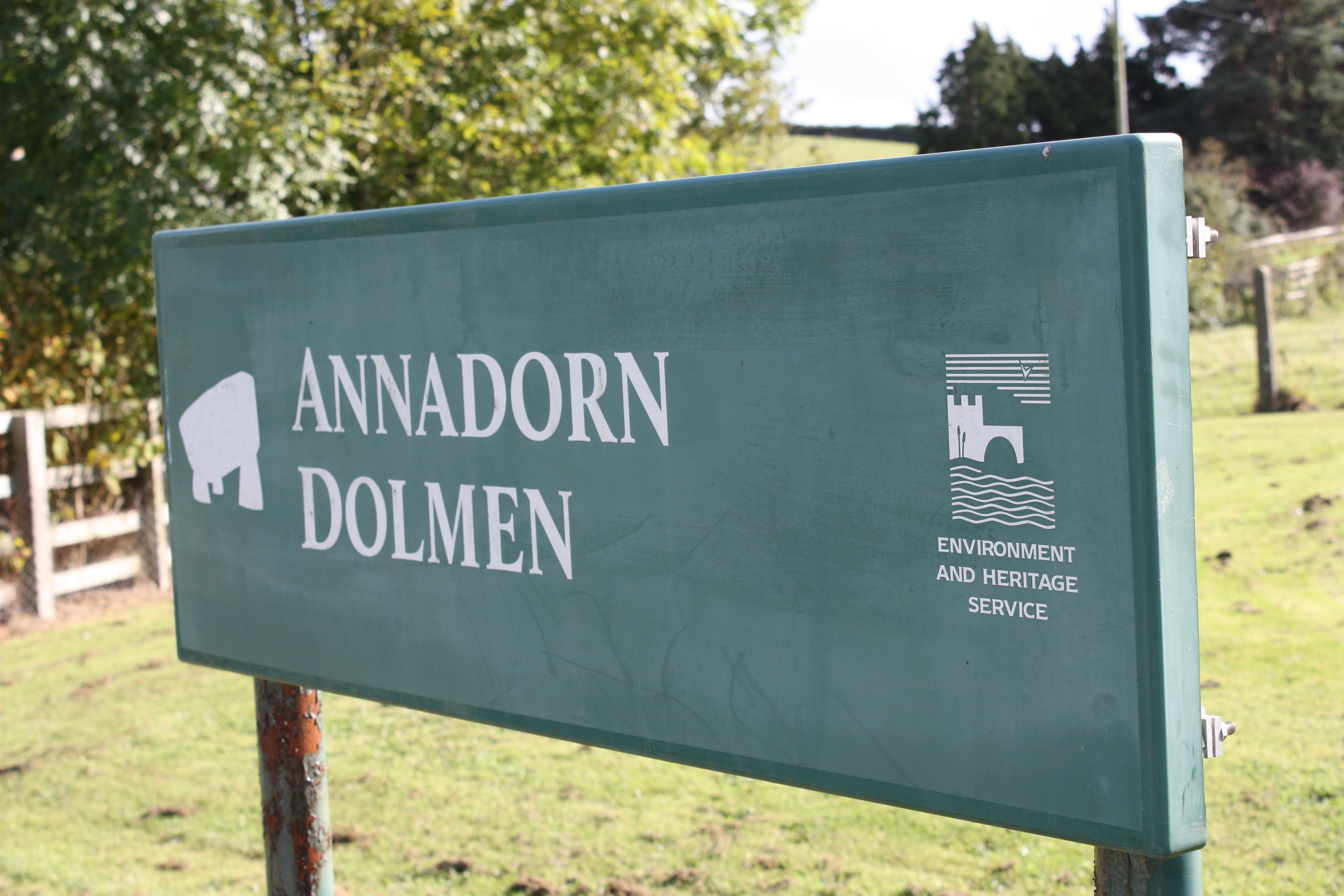
Sign at Annadorn Dolmen, October 2009

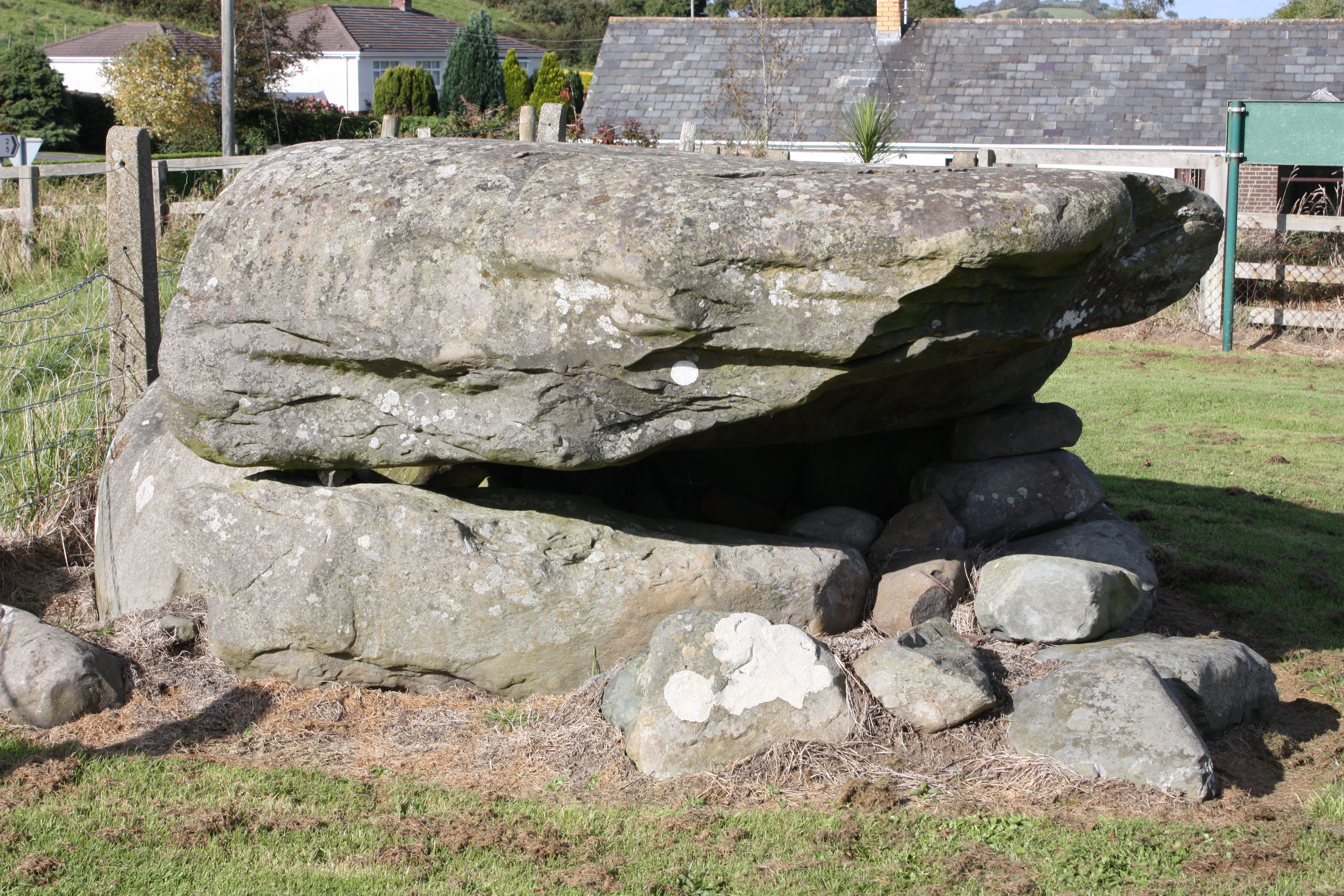
Annadorn Dolmen, October 2009

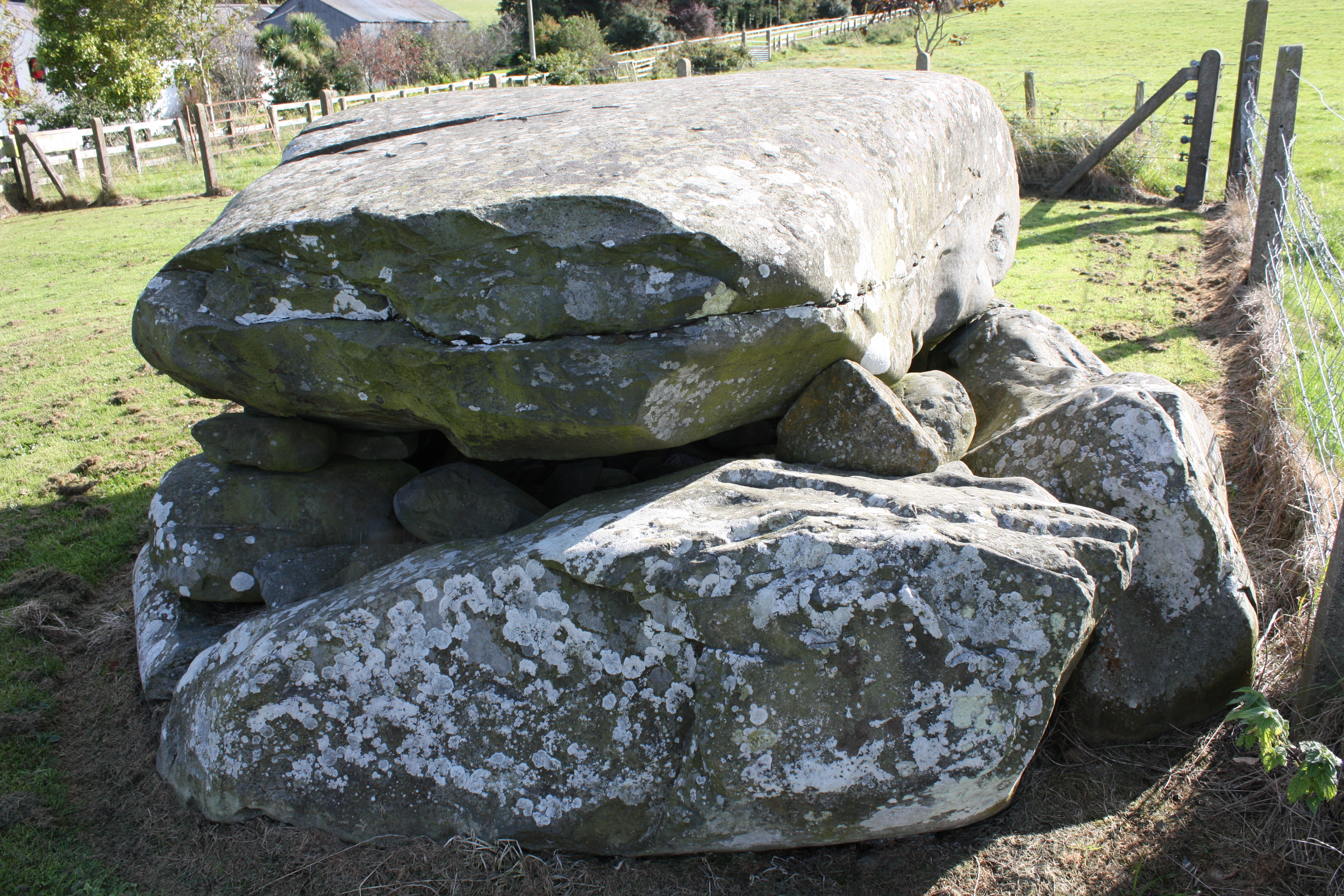
Annadorn Dolmen, October 2009

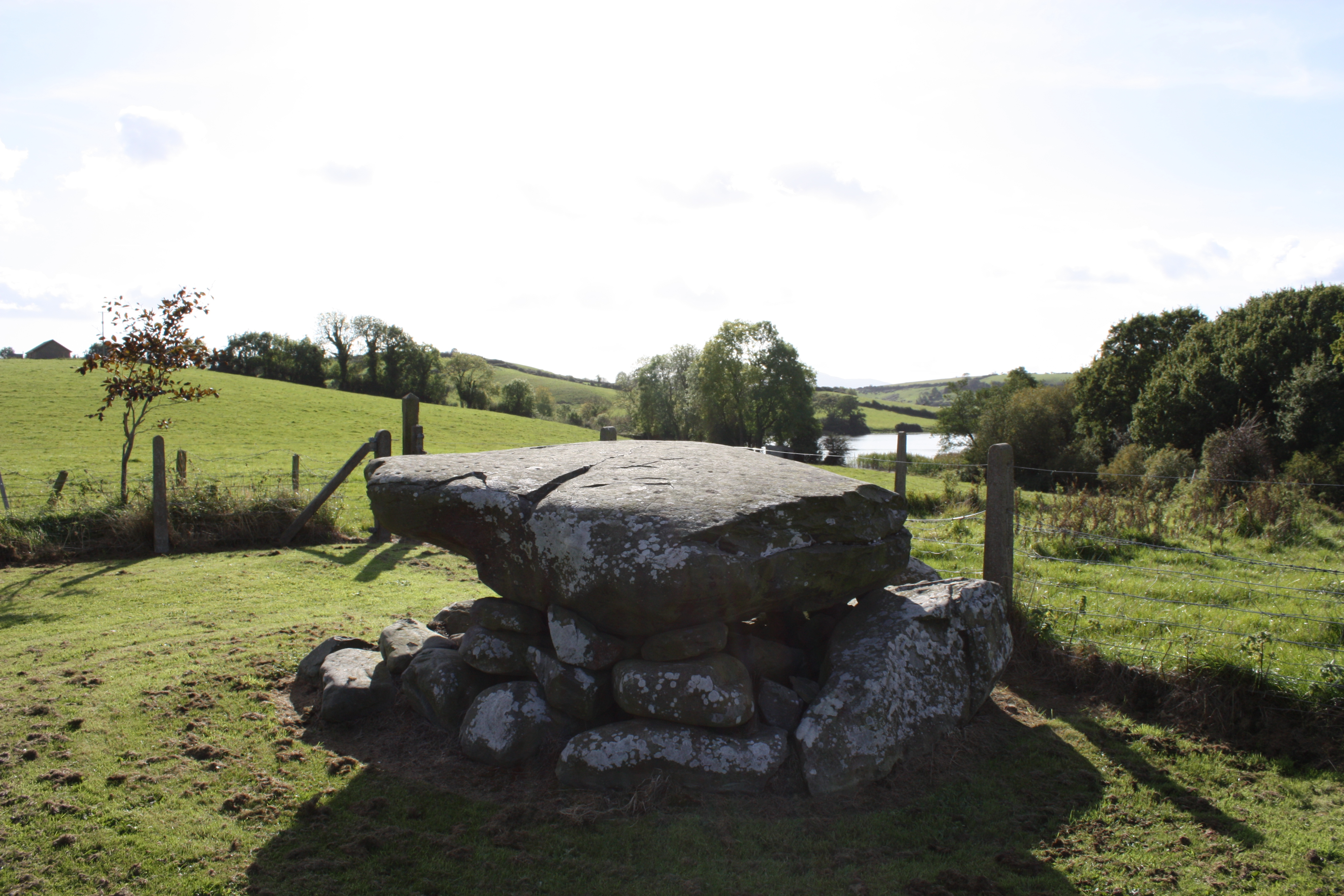
Annadorn Dolmen, with Loughinisland lake in the background, October 2009

== See also ==
- List of archaeological sites in County Down
