= Drumaroad =

Townland in County Down, Northern Ireland

Coordinates: 54°19′24″N 5°53′58″W

Drumaroad: Irish: Droim an Róid
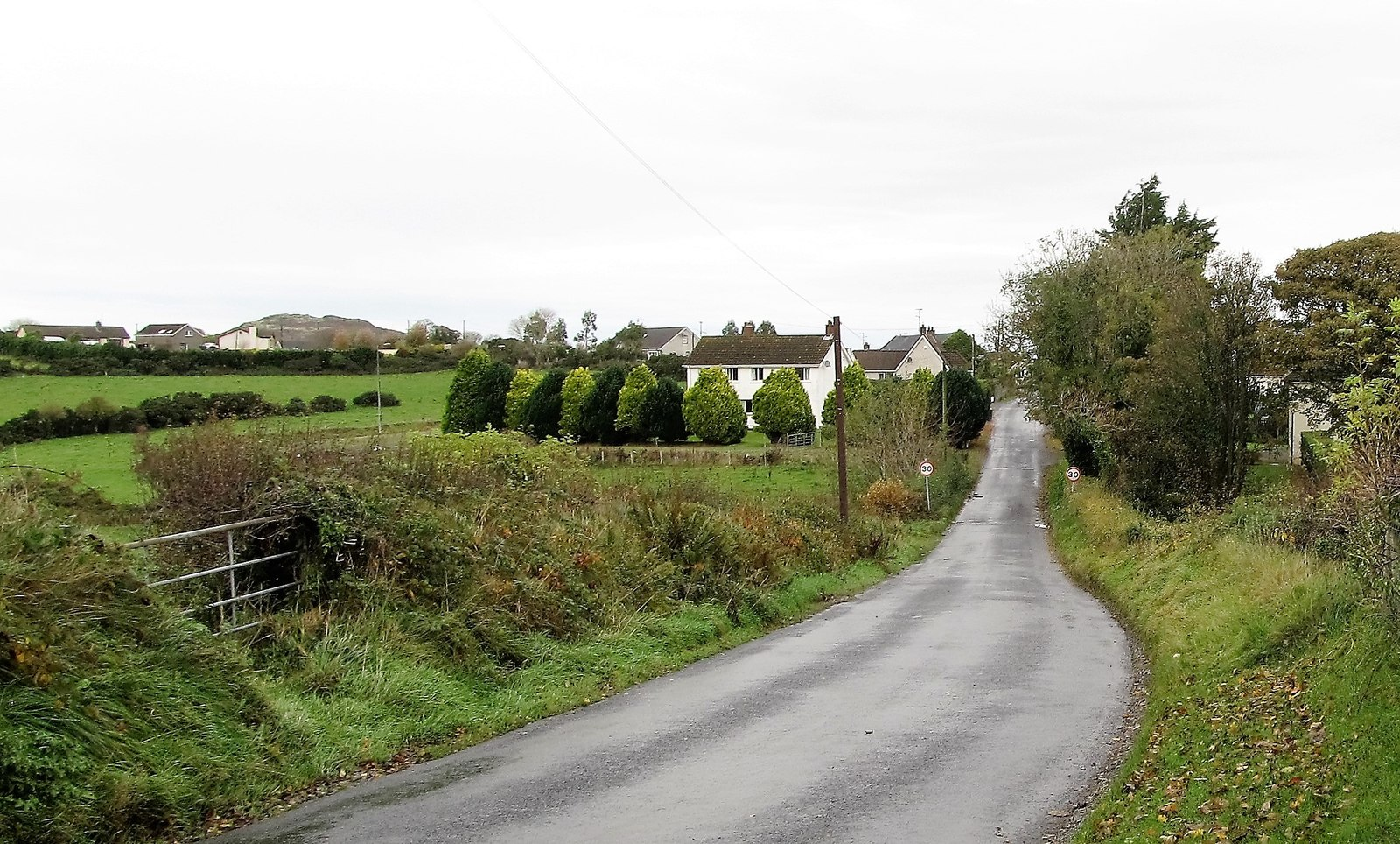
- Approaching the village of Drumaroad from the west along Drumaroad Hill

- Location within Northern Ireland Location within County Down Drumaroad (County Down)
- Population: 183 (2011 census)
- Irish grid reference: J3664643660
- District: Newry, Mourne and Down
- County: County Down
- Country: Northern Ireland
- Sovereign state: United Kingdom
- Post town: CASTLEWELLAN
- Postcode district: BT31 9PD
- Dialling code: 028
- UK Parliament: South Down
- NI Assembly: South Down

Drumaroad is a townland and village in County Down, Northern Ireland. Positioned at the base of Slieve Croob, beneath the Mourne Mountains, it is approximately eight kilometres south of Ballynahinch, Northern Ireland. The area is situated within the electoral division of Seaforde, part of the civil parish of Loughinisland in the barony of Kinelarty. A ridge runs along the eastern bank of the Moneycarragh River, traversed by a road connecting Dundrum to Dromara. Another road from Ballynahinch to Castlewellan passes closer to the village within the townland, potentially being the road referenced in the name of this townland.

== History ==
=== Savage's Castle ===
The Savage family name dates back to 1659, with records in the Pender Census of Ireland showing Richard Savage in the townland of Drumaroad. The Savages of Drumaroad were direct descendants of the older Kirkstone branch, who in turn descended from the Savages of Ards. The lineage of the Savages of Ards dates back to the Anglo-Norman era, when William Baron Savage, one of John de Courcy's captains, built Ardkeen Castle in the Ards of County Down. The Savages became the dominant family in Uladh.

According to historian Colin Johnston Robb, legal and other documents have unequivocally established that the Savages of Drumaroad were a principal collateral branch of the family. During the harshest periods of the Penal Days, they steadfastly maintained their ancestral faith. Their castle at Drumaroad served as a sanctuary for those seeking refuge from persecution and oppression during those perilous times.

In the nearby townland of Drumnaquoil lies the site of the Friary of Drumnaquoil, which served as the locus refugii (place of refuge) for the Franciscans of Down. The exact date when the Franciscans established themselves in this location remains unknown. However, local legend provides an explanation for their choice of this secluded spot. According to the tale, while the friars were praying in Rome, a vision of a lady in white instructed them to build a friary where they would hear the sound of three bells ringing. Exhausted and footsore from their search across Ireland, the friars rested one day at the gate of Savage's Castle in Drumaroad. It was there that they finally heard the long-awaited chimes echoing from the lonely hillside of Drumnaquoil, bringing joy to their hearts.

=== Mass-house ===
The old chapel of Drumaroad, located in the Catholic parish of Dunmore, is believed to have been one of the "five Mass-houses" in County Down mentioned in the Protestant bishop's report to the House of Lords in 1731, which were built before the reign of Queen Anne. According to tradition, its origin is attributed to Edmund Savage, Esq., of Drumaroad, who represented a branch of the Portaferry family residing in that townland. In 1838, construction of a new chapel began, but it was destroyed by the great storm of January 6, 1839, before its completion. The current chapel was subsequently started and completed in 1841. The bell tower was added in 1954.

Within Drumaroad Roman Catholic Church, there is a slab of black slate that originally served as part of the altar of the Franciscan Friary of Drumnaquoil. Subsequently, this slab was repurposed as the headstone for Bernard McAvoy, a writer and local schoolmaster. Notably, it is among the few gravestones in the county predating 1865 that bear an inscription in Irish. In 1935, the slab was relocated inside the church and affixed to the wall, accompanied by a descriptive plaque.

== Archaeology ==
=== White fort ===
The area around Drumaroad, between Slieve Croob and Dundrum Bay, is known for its many old stone or earth-built forts. A comprehensive excavation was conducted at White Fort by Dudley Waterman in 1953 that was published in the Ulster Journal of Archaeology in 1956. The excavation revealed both a house and an underground passage (souterrain) within the fort. The house had two main construction phases. In the first phase, a platform about 25 feet square was built using loose gravelly soil. This platform served as the house's foundation. A layer of charcoal, including burnt sticks, indicated where people lived. This layer contained many pieces of pottery and an iron plough-coulter. Three post-holes were found, suggesting the house was square. The exact structure of the house is unclear, but the floor's limits suggest a square shape.

In the second phase, a stone curb was added to stabilize the platform. This stone border enclosed an area of at least 26 feet square. The house had a paved floor made of flat stones, which was well-preserved in the western half. The entrance was on the south side, with two post-holes supporting the door frame. Four internal posts supported the roof, and a stone-lined hearth was in the centre of the house.

A trench north of the house, likely intended as an underground passage, was discovered. This trench was filled with stone rubble and soil, indicating it was never completed. It may have been meant to provide an underground passage next to the house. It likely remained an open trench for some time before being filled. Additional evidence of occupation was found northeast of the trench, including a stone-built hearth and paving. Various artifacts were recovered, such as pottery, an iron plough-coulter, a glass bead, a piece of a shale bracelet, a spindle-whorl, flint flakes, and quern stones.

The house likely had mud walls and a thatched roof supported by internal posts. The reconstruction suggests a clearstorey for light and ventilation. The walls were probably about 20 inches thick, with a low bench inside. The excavation provided a complete layout of a small agricultural house from the latter part of the first millennium. The findings highlight the variety of living sites in Ulster during the Dark Ages and offer valuable insights into the domestic architecture and farming practices of that time.

=== Carnreagh Fort ===
At the southern end of a high ridge, Carnreagh Fort is part of a group of three enclosures. The platform, with steep sides, is set in pasture land and measures about 29 meters from north to south and 24 meters from east to west. It stands 2.7 meters high on the east and west sides, and 2 meters high on the north and south sides. The top is covered in thick brambles and blackthorn. An earlier survey found signs of a stone structure in the center, but there is no clear entrance. There is also no visible evidence of a surrounding bank or ditch, except for a narrow field drain at the north. When revisited in 2000, the site was still in good condition but covered in dense thorns.

=== Curious find under cromlech near Drumca ===
Drumca is the old parish name for Drumaroad & Clough. The following is an excerpt from the Newtownards Chronicle newspaper (1873-1900) and published on 26th April 1890. It recounts the discovery of a grave by a farmer in Drumaroad while clearing one of his fields. It contained the bones of a large man and an intricately crafted urn.

"CUROIUS FIND IN THE COUNTY DOWN

Lately Mr. Burke, a respectable farmer, who lives at Drumca near Seaforde, County Down, was overhauling a corner of one of his fields, which was entirely of stones, intermingled with hazel shrubs. On removing the debris of stones, Mr. Burke came upon a large stone upwards of two tons in weight, and on this stone being removed immediately beneath it was find a grave and the bones of a man, of what would appear to be of Herculean size. Beside the bones lay and urn of curious workmanship, beaded round. The grave was surrounded by four hewn stones. Since the find the grave has been visited by many of the curious, and the bones and urn are a present in the hands of an antiquarian. We may add that the English of Drumca signifies the hill of the bloody strife."

== Gallery ==
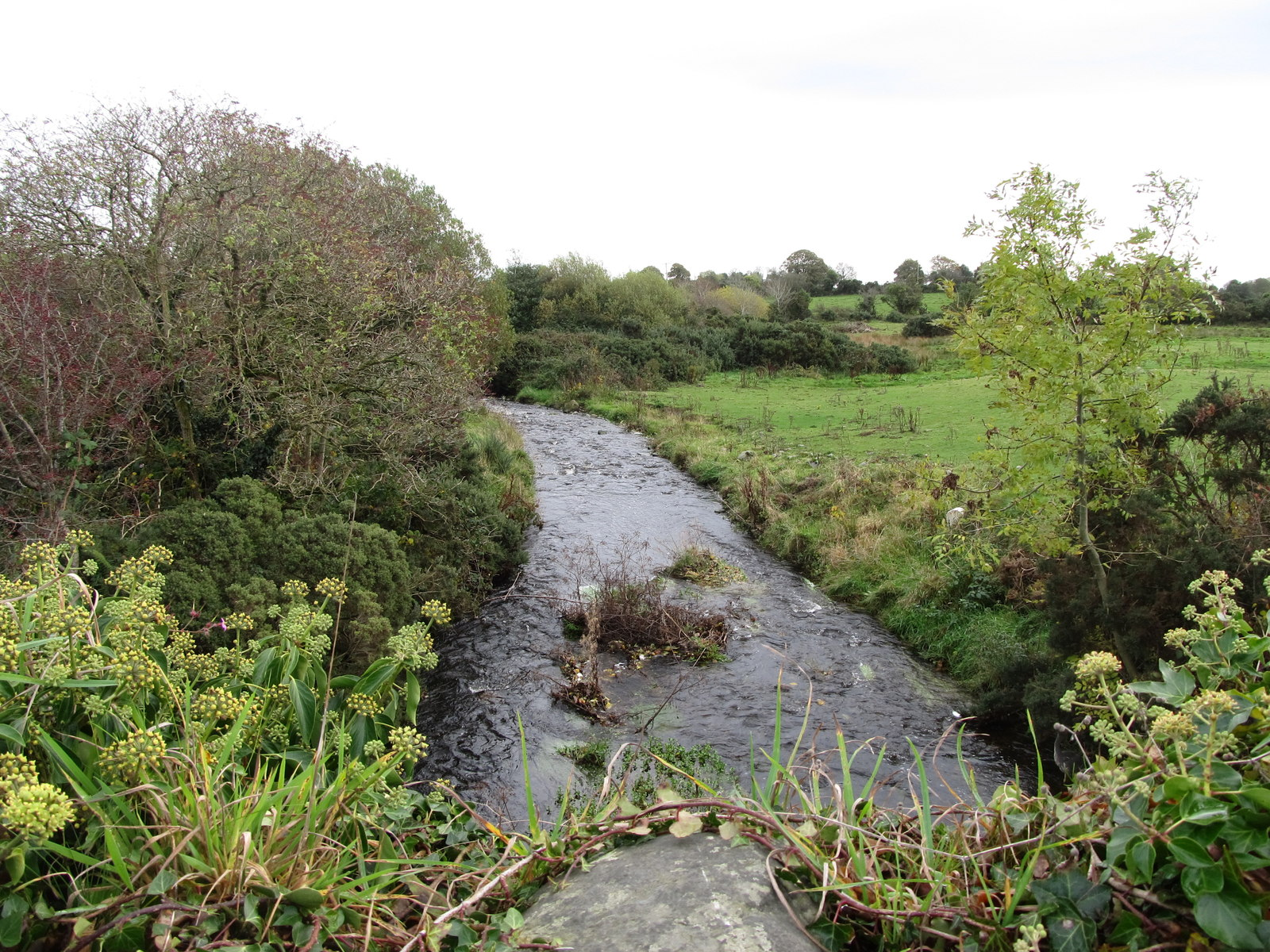
The Moneycarragh River from the Cauley's Pipe Road Bridge

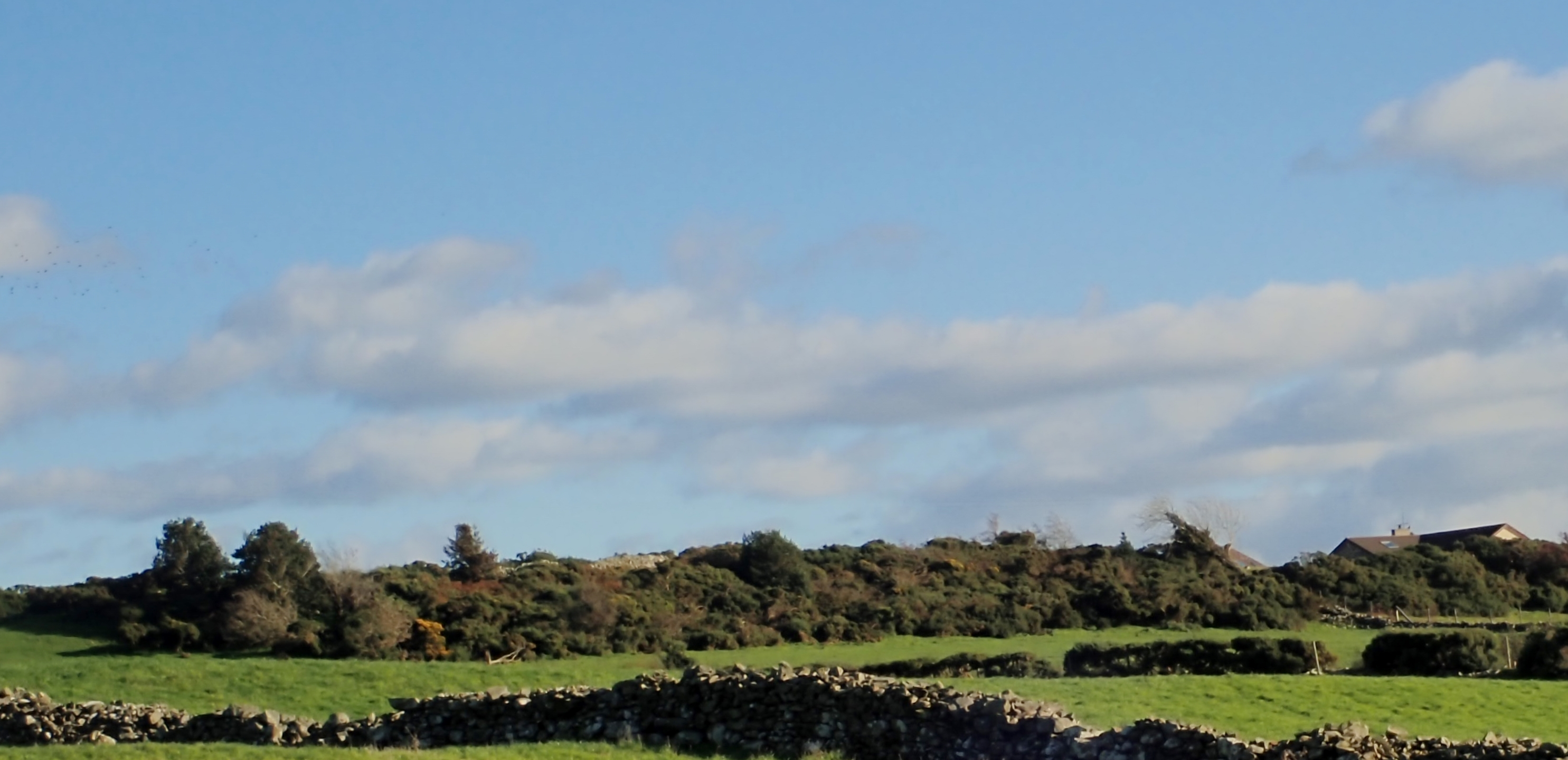
White Fort Cashel north of Drumaroad

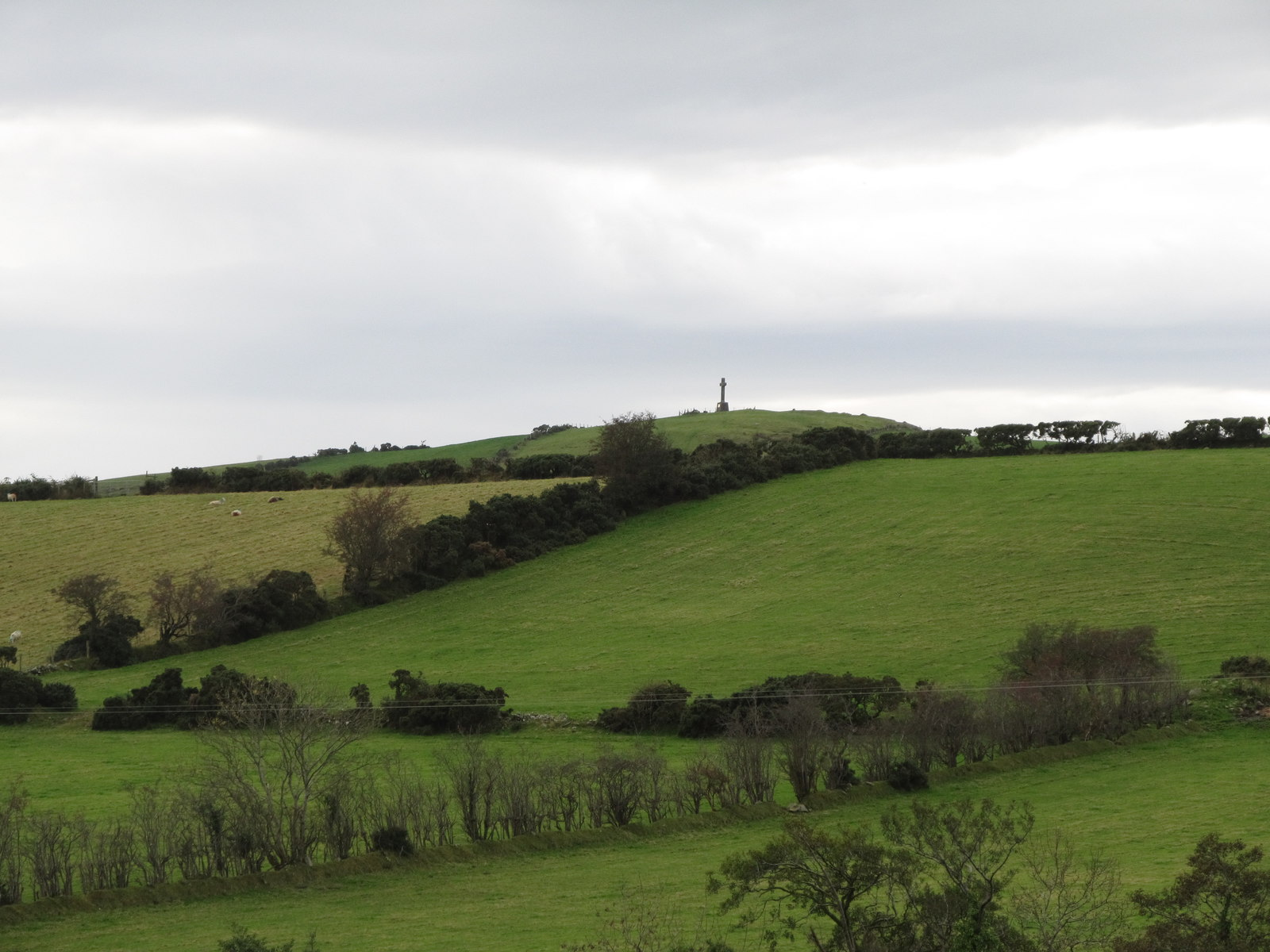
Franciscan Cross at Drumnaquoile

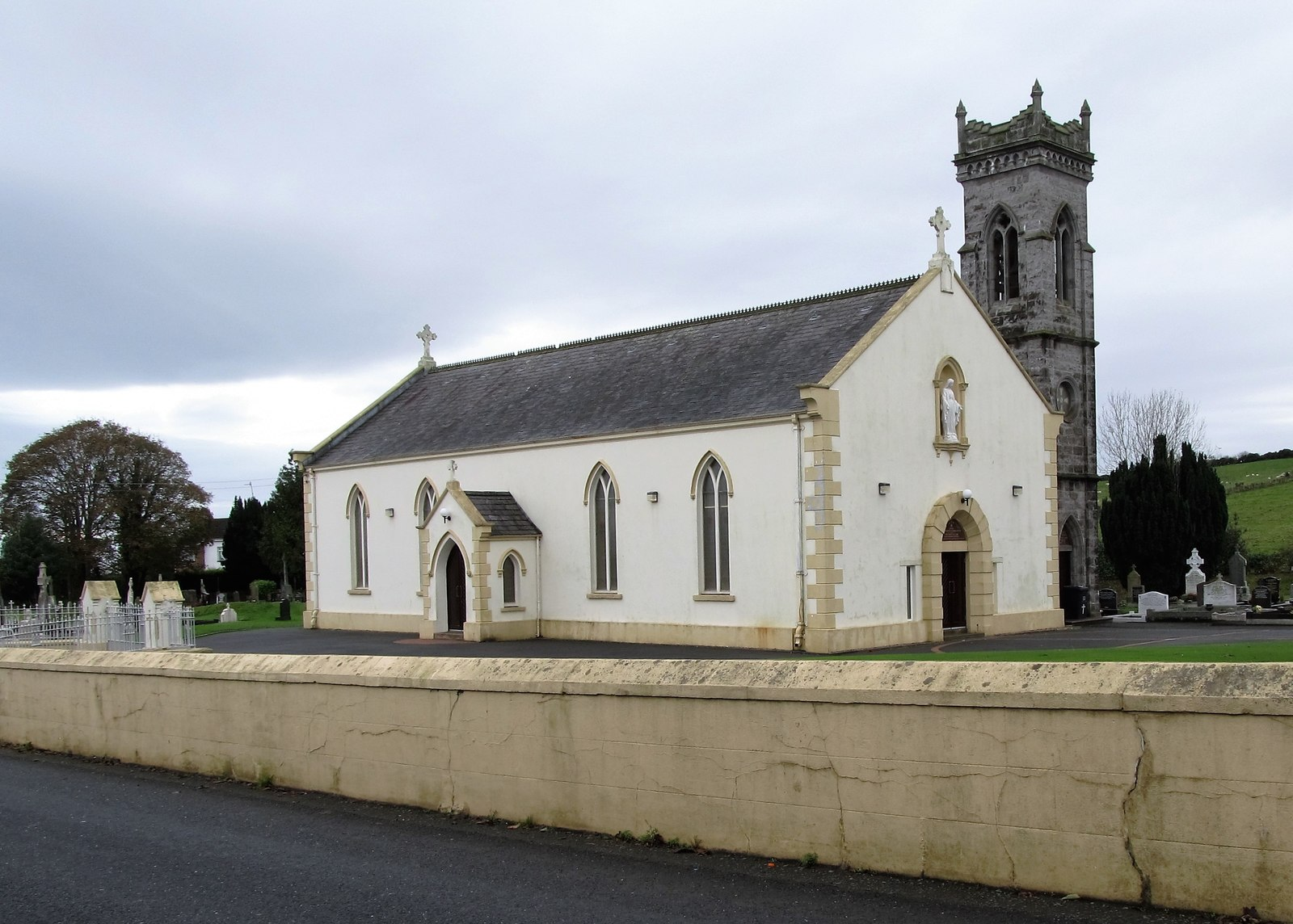
St John the Baptist Catholic Chapel, Drumaroad
(site of mass-house)

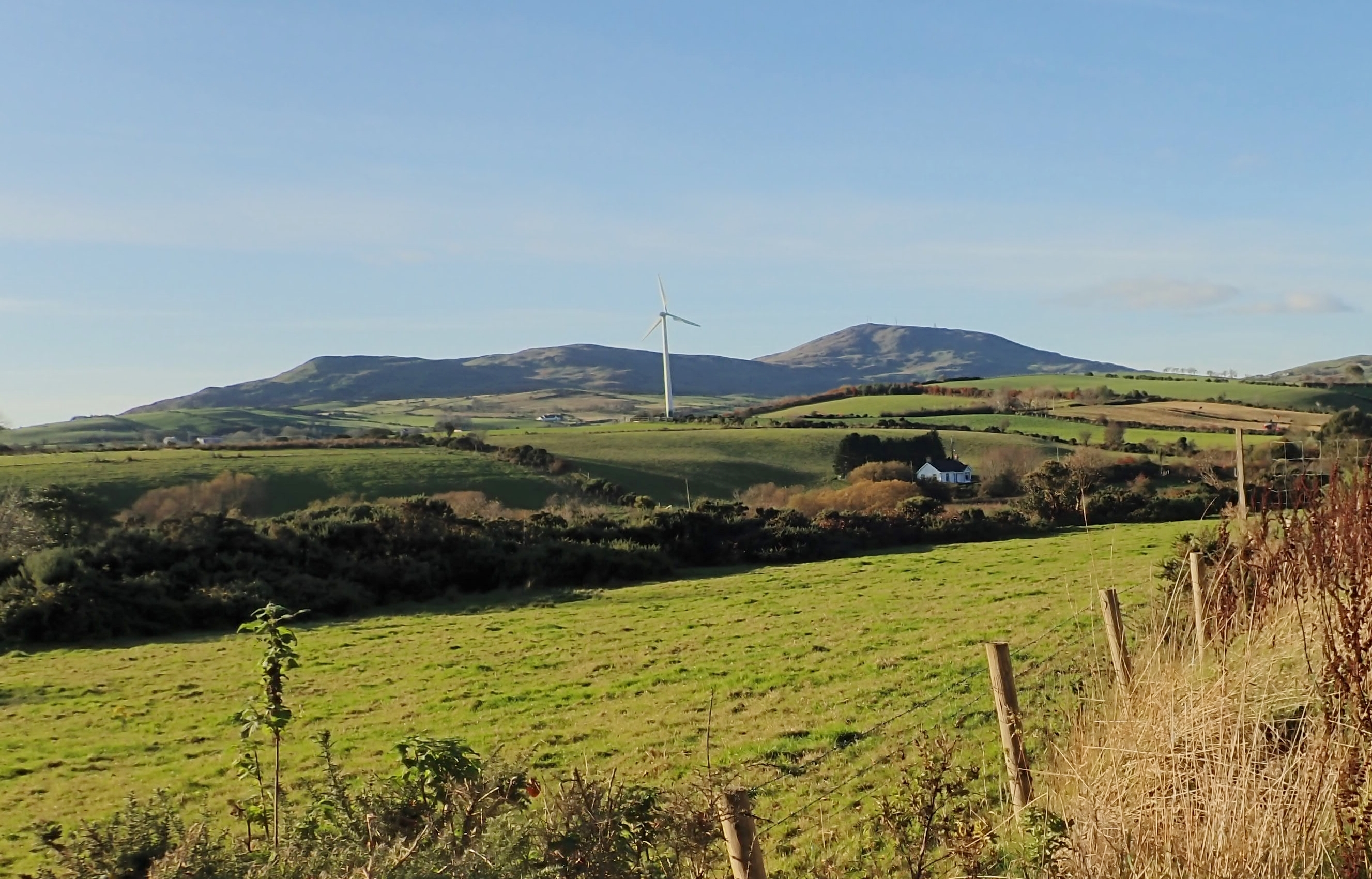
Drumlin belt between Drumaroad and the Slieve Croob Range

== Geography ==
Townlands that border Drumaroad include:

- Claragh to the south
- Drumanaghan to the east
- Dunmore to the north
- Dunturk to the west
- Guiness to the north
- Scrib to the east
