= Annadorn =

Townland in Northern Ireland

Coordinates: 54°19′53″N 5°48′3″W

Annadorn: Irish: Áth na nDorn
- Location within County Down
- County: County Down
- Country: Northern Ireland
- Sovereign state: United Kingdom
- Postcode district: BT
- Dialling code: 028

Annadorn (from Irish Áth na nDorn 'ford of the fists/pebbles') is a rural townland in County Down, Northern Ireland. It has an area of 644.94 acres (2.61 km^{2}). It is situated in the civil parish of Loughinisland and the historic barony of Kinelarty, located 3 miles west of Downpatrick. It lies within the Newry, Mourne and Down District Council.

== See also ==
- List of townlands in County Down
