= Clough Castle =

Ruined motte-and-bailey castle in County Down, Northern Ireland

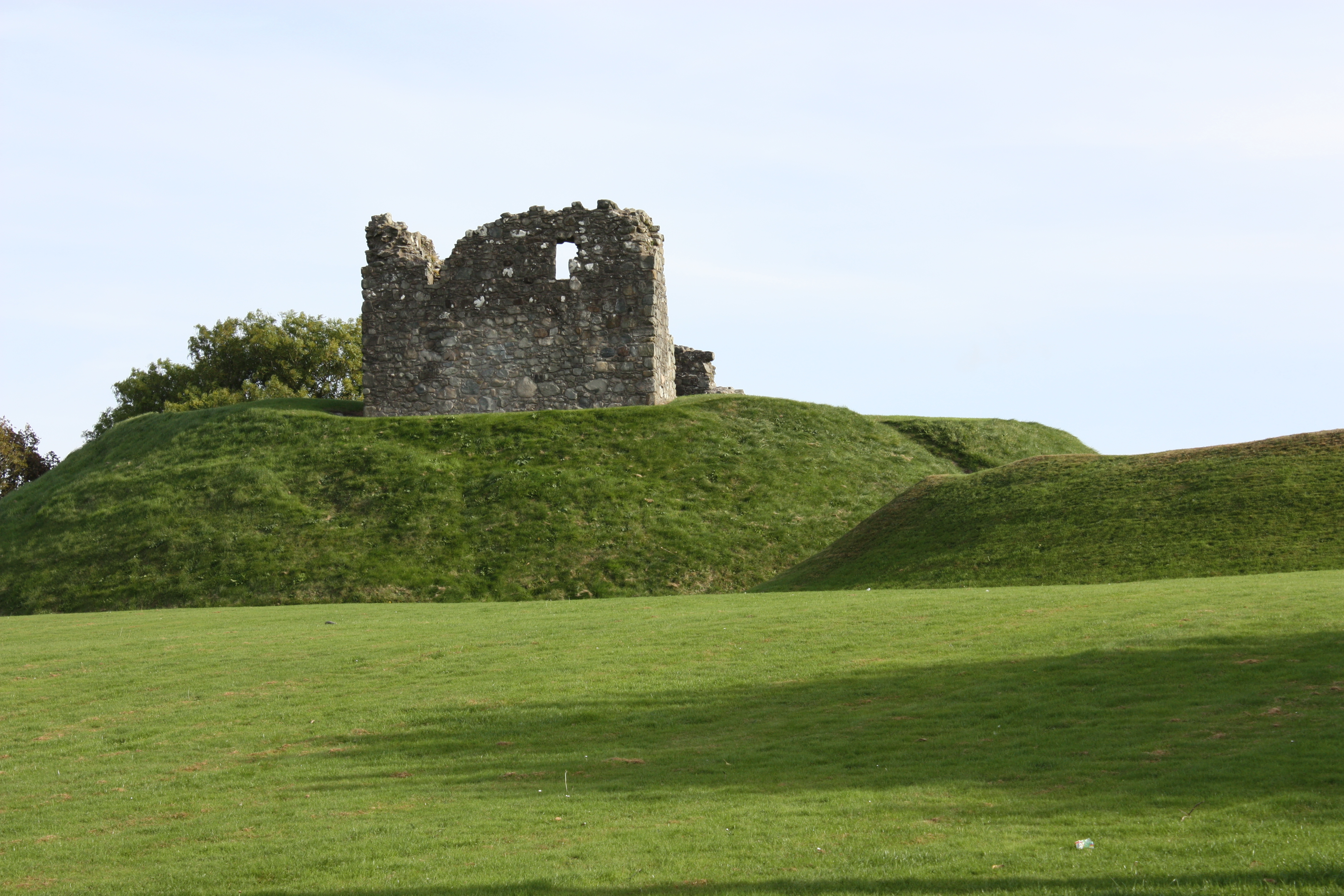
- Clough Castle in October 2009

- Location within Northern Ireland
- 54°17′32″N 5°50′12″W
- Location: Clough, County Down, Northern Ireland

History
- Built: 11th century
- Rebuilt: 15th century

Site notes
- Architect: John de Courcy

Clough Castle is a 12th century Anglo-Norman motte-and-bailey castle located in Clough, County Down, Northern Ireland. It consists of a ruined tower house situated on a 7.6 metres (25 ft) high motte. A small crescent-shaped bailey lies next to the south-east of the motte, separated by a 2.1 metres (6 ft 11 in) deep ditch.

== History ==
Clough Castle was constructed during the 12th century by John de Courcy. At this time the motte was defended by a relatively soft and flammable timber palisade of posts under 10 cm in diameter, which may have been covered with clay for added strength. Behind the palisade, there were three pits for archers to stand in, with rough loopholes framed by boulders. In the mid-13th century, a stone hall was built within the palisade, and seems to have burnt down almost immediately. A stone keep was then built, and the palisade was replaced by an earth bank. The castle may have been abandoned during the early 14th century before the keep was rebuilt as a tower house in the 15th or 16th centuries.

The motte was almost completely excavated under Dudley Waterman in 1951–52, revealing the early phases of the site's occupation.
