= Loughinisland Churches =

Coordinates: 54°20′13.87″N 5°48′44.01″W

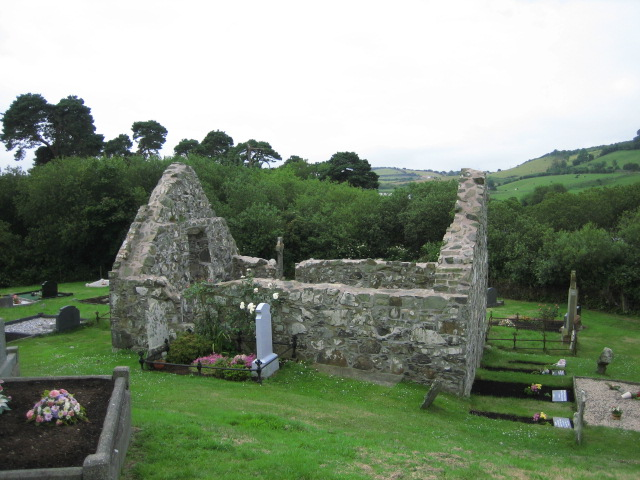
South Church and graveyard, 2006

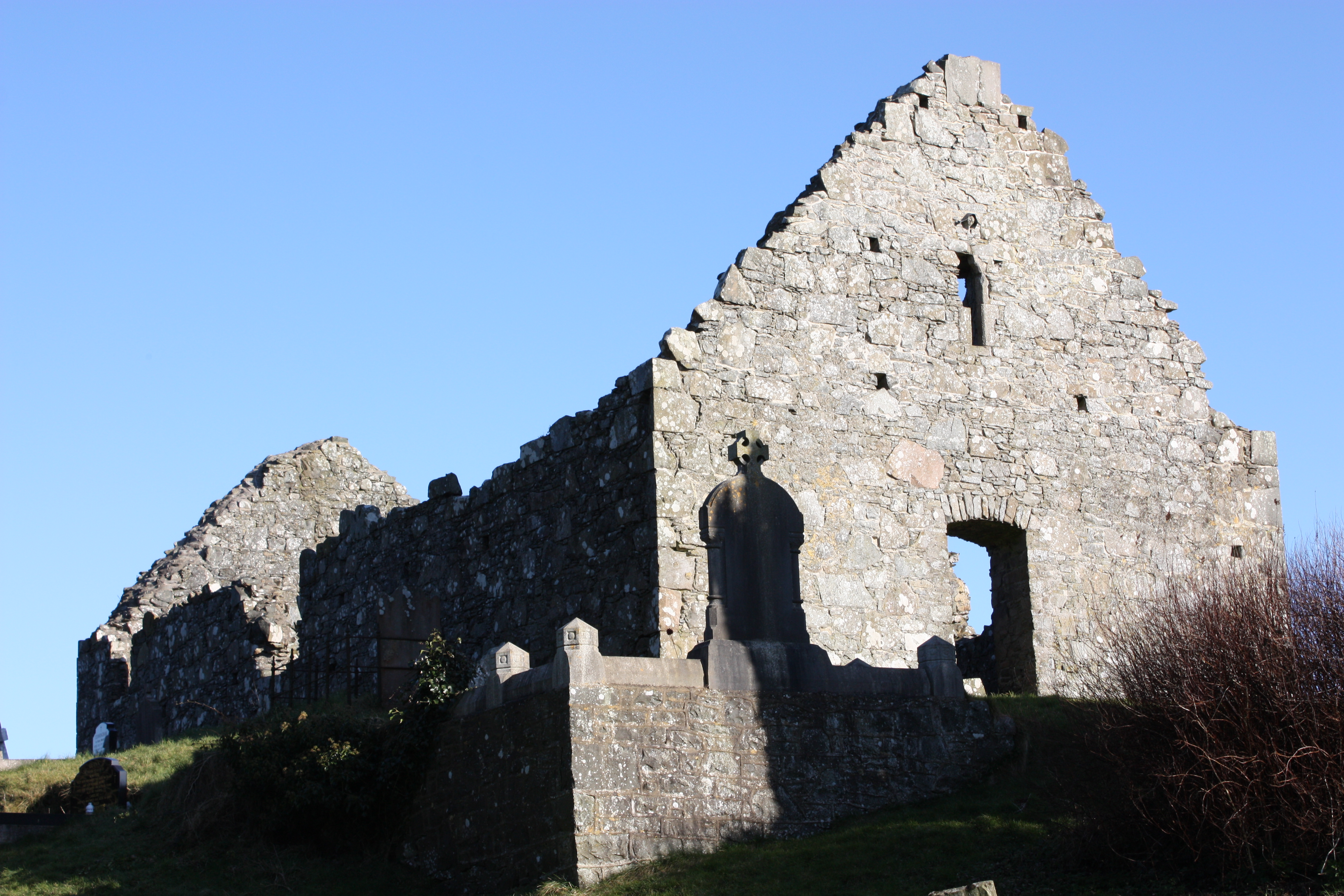
North Church, March 2010

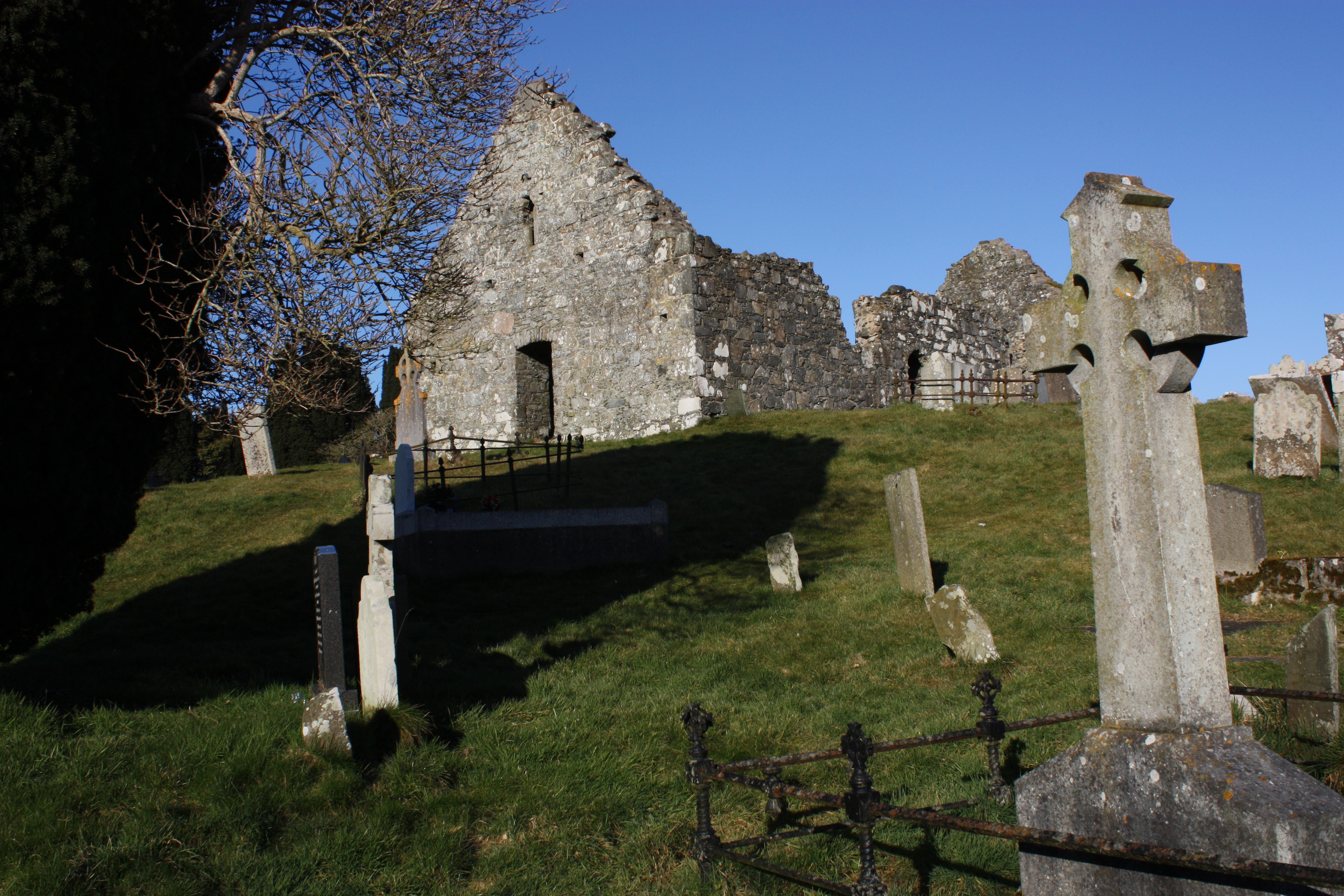
North Church and graveyard, 2010

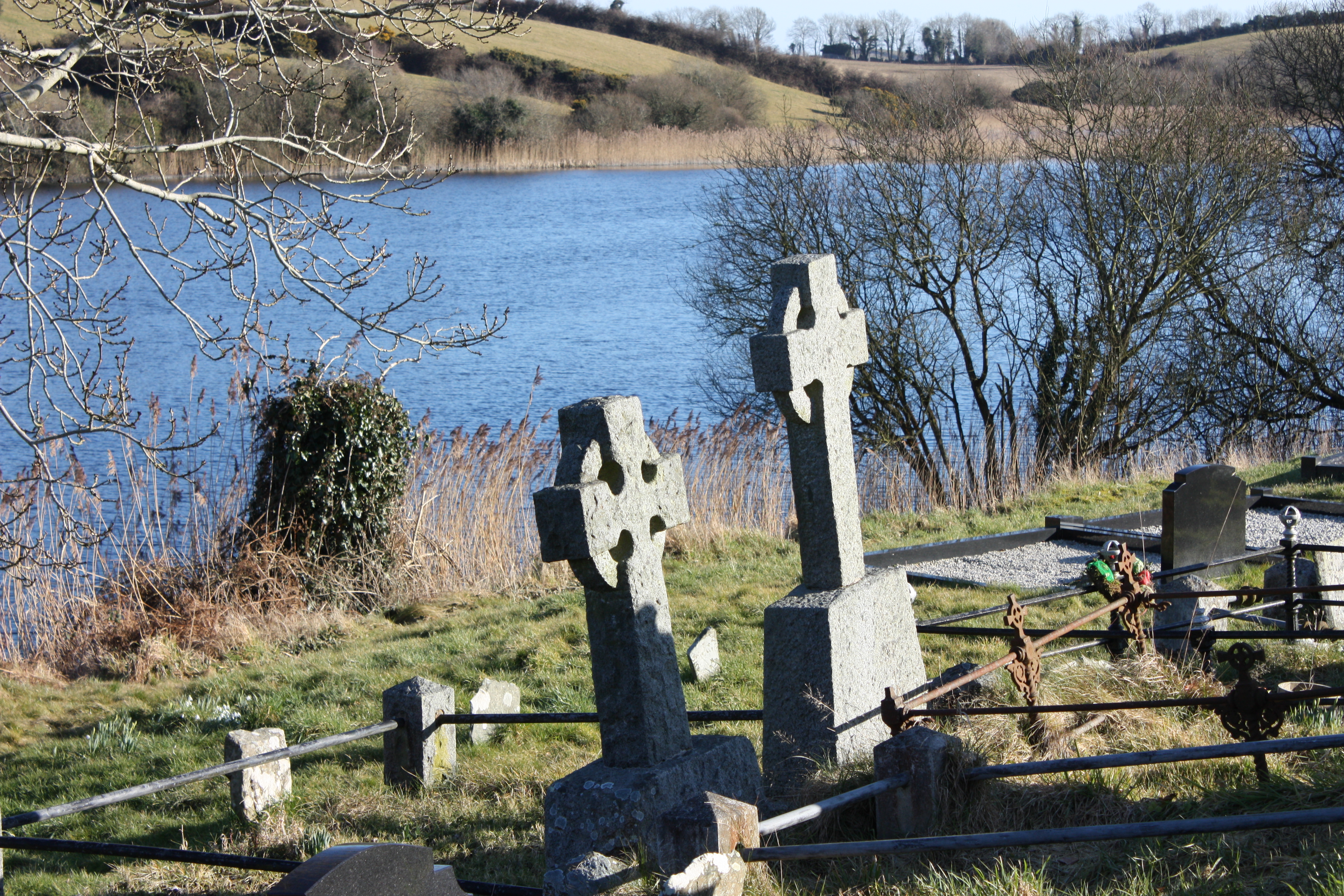
Graveyard, March 2010

The Loughinisland Churches are the remains of three ruined churches in Loughinisland, County Down, Northern Ireland, dating from the 13th to the 17th centuries. They are situated in Tievenadarragh townland, in a large graveyard on an island in Loughinisland Lake, now reached by a causeway. The churches are state-care historic monuments at grid ref: J4234 4537.

== History ==
The island and its churches appear in medieval sources under the name Lerkes or Lyrge.

The North Church is 66.5 ft by 30 ft, the gables and most of the side walls are standing and a doorway in the west end has a narrow window above it.
