= Kinelarty =

Former barony in County Down, Northern Ireland

Kinelarty Cineál Fhártaigh(Irish)
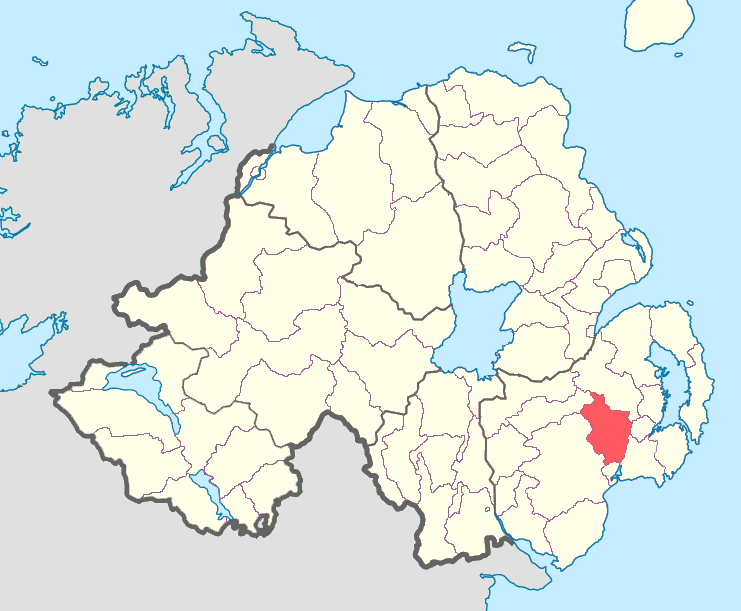
- Location of Kinelarty, County Down, Northern Ireland.
- Sovereign state: United Kingdom
- Country: Northern Ireland
- County: Down

Kinelarty (from Irish Cineál Fhaghartaigh 'Faghartach's kindred') is a former Irish district and barony in County Down, Northern Ireland. It lies east of the centre of the county, and is bordered by five other baronies: Iveagh Upper, Lower Half to the west; Lecale Upper to the south and south-east; Lecale Lower to the east; Castlereagh Upper to the north; and Iveagh Lower, Upper Half to the north-west.

It is centred historically on the ancient church at Loughinisland.

== History ==
Kinelarty derives its name from the Irish Cineál Fhaghartaigh, which means Faghartach's (Fogarty's) kindred. This was the name of an Irish district, the chiefs of which were the Mac Artáin (McCartan) family.

The Mac Artáins descend from Artán, grandson of Fagartaigh of Uí Echach Cobo (anglicised as Iveagh). The Mac Artáin’s, as is professed throughout the Annals of the Four Masters and in parts the Annals of Innisfallen reigned supreme as High Kings for considerable periods of history further positioning themselves as lords of Iveagh.

By 1177, the Norman John de Courcy had arrived in Ulster and set about conquering most of eastern Ulster, forming the Earldom of Ulster. The only clans who were able to exist independently in eastern Ulster during this time were in the interior away from the sea-coast, where the Uí Tuirtre, north of Lough Neagh, and the Uí Echach Cobo.

During the 14th century the Normans in Ulster faded as a result of the Bruce Invasion, with this period seeing the Mac Aonghusa and Mac Artáin clans emerge and expand from Uibh Echach, with their respective territories becoming the basis of the future baronies of Iveagh and Kinelarty. With the fall of Norman power in Ulster, the Clann Aodha Bhuidhe (Clandeboy) branch of the O'Neills took control of north Down, with the chiefs of Kinelarty eventually becoming their tributaries.

Early mentions in regards to Kinelarty and the Mac Artáins/McCartans include:

- 1004 or 1005, Flaithbheartach gained a victory over the Uí Echach and Ulaid at Loch Bricrenn, where Artán, heir of Uí Echach was killed.
- 1011, Muircheartach, son of Artán, the heir of Uí Echach, was killed in the "Battle of the Mullachs".
- 1157, "Kenel Fagartay" and "Kenelfagarthay" are recorded by the Normans in the Newry Charter.
- 1165, a Diarmait Mac Artáin head of Clainne-Fogartaigh and all Uí Echach died.
- 1178, Cinaeth Mac Cartain is mentioned as head of Ceneil Fogartaigh.
- 1370-5, Mac Artain uirrí (sub-king) of Cenel Fhagartoigh, was killed by his own kinsman, Mac Gilla Ternaind.

By the Elizabethan era, Kinelarty was simultaneously known under variations of "McCartan's country", and during the reign of James I simultaneously under variations of "Killenarten", before once again becoming simply known as variations of Kinelarty. In 1575 Kinelarty was assigned by the Crown to a Captain Malby, who left very soon after, complaining that it was: ".. all desolate and waste, full of thieves, outlaws and unreclaimed people".

By the 1660s the area from Seaforde towards Slieve Croob belonged to the Forde family, the first of whom had married a daughter of the last McCartan chief.

A book published in 2013, titled The McCartans of Kinelarty, written by Thérése Ghesquiére-Diérickx and Sean McCartan, details the history of the McCartan family in the area and also the linkage to Charles de Gaulle through his great-grandmother Angélique Marie McCartan.

== List of settlements ==
Below is a list of settlements in Kinelarty:

=== Towns ===
- Ballynahinch

=== Villages ===
- Annacloy
- Clough
- Drumaness
- Drumaroad
- Kilmore
- Loughinisland
- Seaforde
- Spa

== List of civil parishes ==
Below is a list of civil parishes in Kinelarty:

- Annahilt (one townland, rest in barony of Iveagh Lower, Lower Half)
- Dromara (also partly in baronies of Iveagh Lower, Lower Half and Iveagh Upper, Lower Half)
- Kilmegan (also partly in baronies of Iveagh Upper, Lower Half and Lecale Upper)
- Kilmore (also partly in barony of Castlereagh Upper)
- Loughinisland
- Magheradrool (also partly in barony of Iveagh Lower, Lower Half (one townland))
