= Seaforde =

Village in County Down, Northern Ireland

Coordinates: 54°18′N 5°50′W

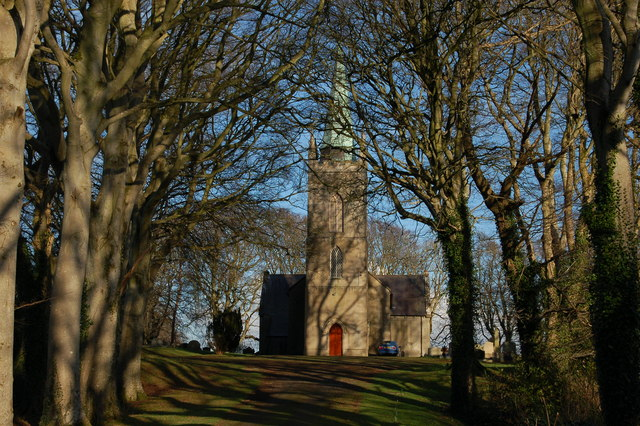
Parish church, Seaforde

Seaforde is a small village in County Down, Northern Ireland. It is within the townland of Naghan, one mile (1.6 km) north of Clough on the main Ballynahinch to Newcastle road. It is part of the Newry, Mourne and Down area.

== History ==
The village is named after the Forde family, who descend from Nicholas Forde of Dunboyne County Meath, who held the post of Deputy Victualler in Cork in 1580, as supplier to Elizabeth I of England's army in Ireland. The village lands were purchased by Nicholas's fifth son, Mathew Forde (who later sat in the Irish House of Commons in 1642) as part of a wider acquisition of estate lands in Kinelarty in County Down, which he purchased from Thomas Cromwell, Viscount Lecale between the years 1615 and 1636. Mathew Forde, who also owned properties in Fishamble-street in Dublin, had already purchased estate lands in and around the village of Coolgreany in County Wexford in 1617. Although Coolgreany was the principal seat of the Forde family during the 17th century, after the Battle of the Boyne Seaforde became the family's principal place of residence.

=== Seaforde House ===
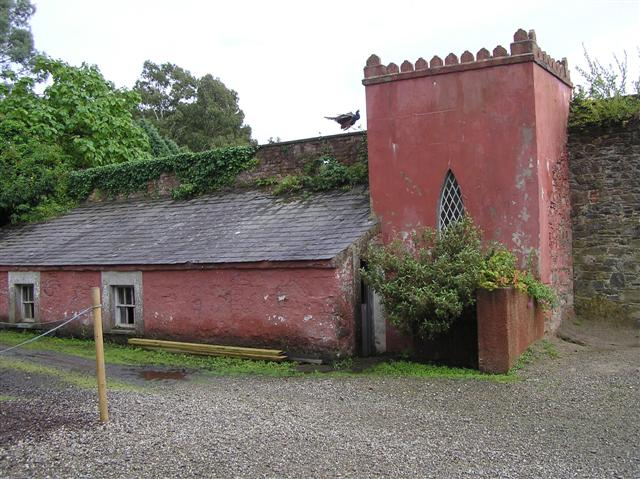
Seaforde Gardens and Tropical Butterfly House

Mathew Forde (1675-1729) built the original mansion on the Seaforde demesne, which lies to the north of the village. It was rebuilt in 1819, after a destructive fire, by Mathew Forde, MP (1785-1837) to create the present house, a neo-classical building of seven bays and three storeys over a basement, the top storey being treated as an attic. There is a five-bay frontage faced in sandstone ashlar.

The estate was at one time the home of the Lecale Hunt, and later the East Down Hunt. Seaforde was the birthplace of Colonel Francis Forde (1718 to 1770), who fought and served with Clive of India. The Forde family still resides at Seaforde House. The present occupant being Lady Anthea Forde, widow of Patrick Mathew Desmond Forde J.P. D.L. and daughter of the Earl of Belmore of Castle Coole in Co. Fermanagh.

== See also ==
- List of towns and villages in Northern Ireland
