= Clough =

Village in County Down, Northern Ireland

Coordinates: 54.289°N 5.835°W

Clough: Irish: An Chloch
- Village
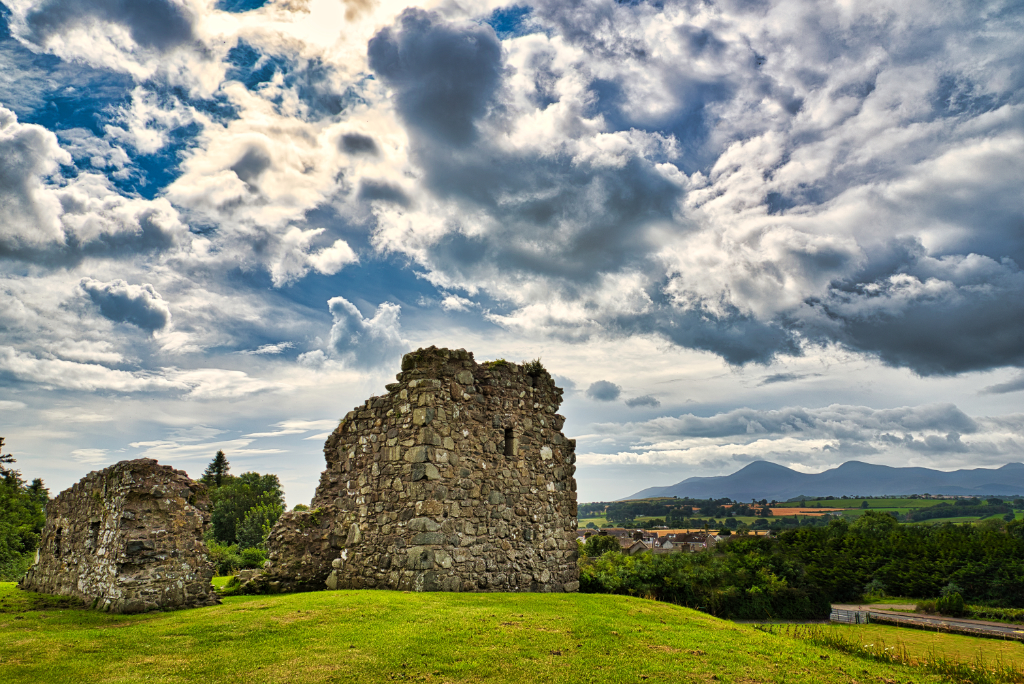
- Clough Castle
- Population: 313 (2021 census)
- District: Newry, Mourne and Down
- Country: Northern Ireland
- Sovereign state: United Kingdom
- Post town: DOWNPATRICK
- Police: Northern Ireland
- Fire: Northern Ireland
- Ambulance: Northern Ireland

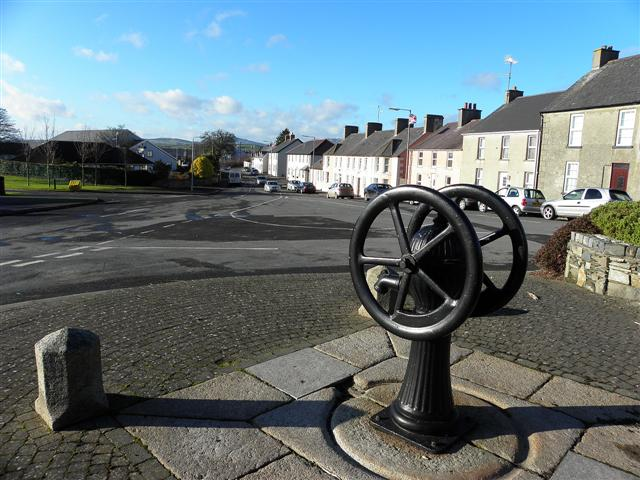
Old pump on Clough's former square

Clough (/ˈklɒx/ KLOKH; from Irish An Chloch, meaning 'stone or stone building') is a village and townland in County Down, Northern Ireland. The village, which is situated within the Newry, Mourne and Down area, had a population of 313 people as of the 2021 census.

== Etymology ==
The area was originally named Rathcath, from Irish Ráth Cath 'fort of the battles', and later anglicised as Racatt. There are records of a battle (cath) in the area in the mid 12th century. By the 17th century, the settlement was marked as Magheracat and the castle as Cloghmagheracat. This is believed to have come from Irish Cloch Mhachaire Cath 'stone castle of the battle plain'. However, it appeared to have been misinterpreted as Cloch Mhachaire Cat, "stone castle of the plain of the cat". There is an associated legend of a large magical wildcat in the district.

== History ==
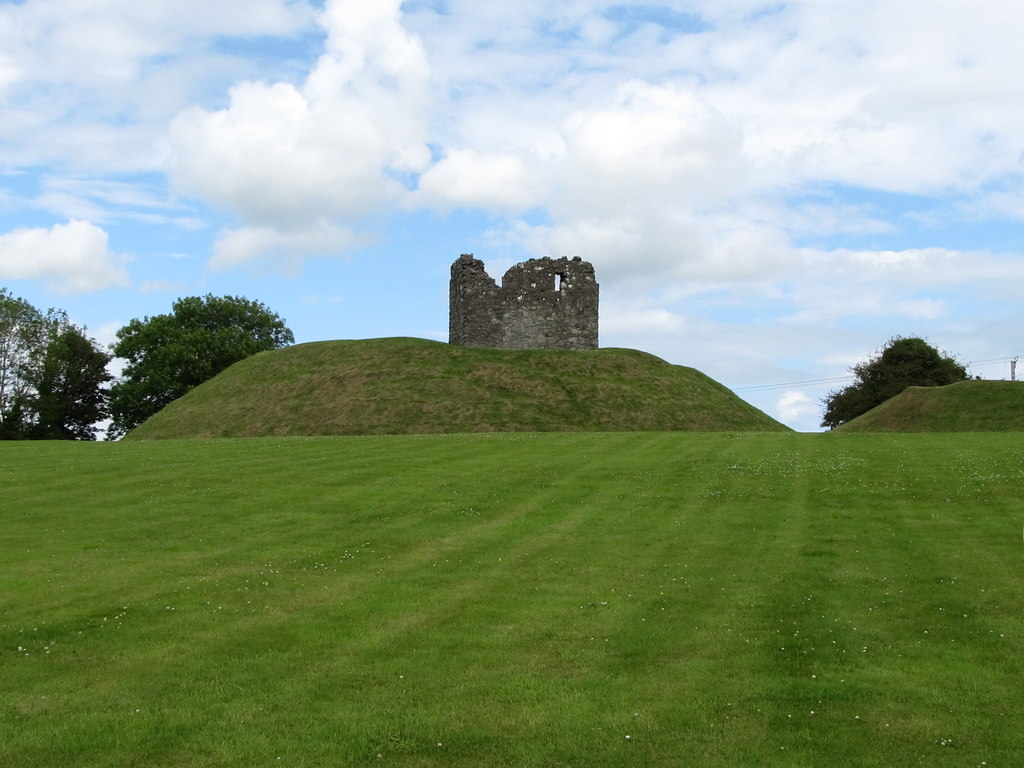
Clough Castle

Clough Castle, an Anglo-Norman motte-and-bailey castle, was built in the area in the late 12th century. Its construction is traditionally associated with John de Courcy (c. 1150–1219).

In A Topographical Dictionary of Ireland (published by Samuel Lewis in 1837), four fairs were held in Clough annually, and the village had a population of approximately 300 inhabitants.

In 2026, a leaflet was reportedly distributed to households in the area which threatened "anyone displaying nationalist or Islamic cultural symbols" with "eviction". The letter instructed recipients to contact DUP Cllr Alan Lewis, who said that he reported the matter to the Police Service of Northern Ireland for associating his name with the "false claim[s]" made in the leaflet.

== Geography ==
Clough is within the Newry, Mourne and Down local government district. It sits about 3 miles from Dundrum on the A2 between Newcastle and Belfast. The A2 continues via Downpatrick and the coast via Strangford and the Portaferry–Strangford ferry to Portaferry and on to Belfast, whilst most road traffic heads along from Clough along the A24 via Carryduff to Belfast.

== Demography ==
As of the 2001 census, Clough had a population of 255 people. By the time of the 2021 census, the village had 313 residents.
